= 2026 UK Open =

2026 Ladbrokes UK Open

Tournament information
- Dates: 6–8 March 2026
- Venue: Butlin's Resort
- Location: Minehead, England
- Organisation(s): Professional Darts Corporation (PDC)
- Format: Legs; Final – best of 21
- Prize fund: £750,000
- Winner's share: £120,000
- Nine-dart finish: Danny Noppert
- High checkout: 170; Joe Cullen; Kai Gotthardt; Luke Littler; Connor Scutt; Peter Wright

Champion(s)
- Luke Littler (ENG)

The 2026 UK Open (known for sponsorship reasons as the 2026 Ladbrokes UK Open) was a professional darts tournament that took place from 6 to 8 March 2026 at the Butlin's Resort in Minehead, England. It was the 24th staging of the UK Open by the Professional Darts Corporation (PDC). The winner received £120,000 from a total prize fund of £750,000.

The tournament's 157-player field consisted of 126 PDC Tour Card holders, 15 top players from the 2025 editions of the PDC Development Tour and the PDC Challenge Tour, and 16 amateur qualifiers. Players entered the tournament incrementally based on their PDC Order of Merit ranking, with an open draw conducted for each round.

Luke Littler was the defending champion, having defeated James Wade 11–2 in the 2025 final. In a repeat of the previous year's final, he retained his title by beating Wade 11–7. Littler became the fourth player to defend the title, after Raymond van Barneveld, Phil Taylor and Michael van Gerwen, and was the first to achieve the feat since Van Gerwen in 2016.

Danny Noppert hit a nine-dart finish to win his fourth-round match against Dimitri Van den Bergh.

== Overview ==
=== Background ===
The 2026 UK Open was the 24th edition of the tournament to be staged by the Professional Darts Corporation (PDC) since the inaugural edition in 2003. The tournament is commonly referred to as the "FA Cup of darts" due to its round-by-round open draw system. The first event was held at the Reebok Stadium in Bolton, England, and was won by Phil Taylor, who defeated Shayne Burgess 18–8 in the final. Taylor remains the most successful player in the event's history, winning it a total of five times. Following a decade of being held in Bolton, the event moved to the Butlin's Resort in Minehead in 2014 and has stayed there, with the exception of the 2021 edition held in Milton Keynes.

The 2026 edition was held from 6 to 8 March 2026 at the Butlin's Resort in Minehead. British gambling company Ladbrokes continued its sponsorship of the event. Luke Littler entered the tournament as defending champion, having defeated James Wade 11–2 in the 2025 final to win his first UK Open title.

=== Format ===
All 157 participants were unseeded, although players entered the tournament incrementally: PDC Tour Card holders ranked 97–128 on the PDC Order of Merit entered in the first round along with all other qualifiers; those ranked 65–96 entered in the second round; those ranked 33–64 entered in the third round; and those ranked 1–32 entered in the fourth round. An open draw was conducted for each round.

The tournament operated under a multi-board system: eight boards were used for matches in the first, second, third and fourth rounds; four boards were used for matches in the fifth round; two boards were used for matches in the sixth round; and the quarter-finals, semi-finals and final all took place on the main stage. All matches were in leg play format, with the number of legs required to win increasing as the tournament progresses:

- First, second and third rounds: Best of 11 legs
- Fourth round, fifth round, sixth round and quarter-finals: Best of 19 legs
- Semi-finals and final: Best of 21 legs

=== Prize money ===
The total prize fund for the event increased from £600,000 in 2025 to £750,000 in 2026. The winner received £120,000. The prize money breakdown was:

Stage (no. of players)		Prize money (Total: £750,000)
Winner	(1)	£120,000
Runner-up	(1)	£60,000
Semi-finalists	(2)	£35,000
Quarter-finalists	(4)	£20,000
Last 16 (sixth round)	(8)	£12,500
Last 32 (fifth round)	(16)	£7,500
Last 64 (fourth round)	(32)	£3,000
Last 96 (third round)	(32)	£2,000
Last 128 (second round)	(32)	£1,250
Last 160 (first round)	(32)	n/a

=== Broadcasts ===
The tournament was broadcast on ITV4 and ITVX in the United Kingdom. Other broadcasters airing the main-stage matches included Viaplay in the Netherlands and the Nordic countries; DAZN and Sport1 in Germany; Fox Sports in Australia; Sky Sport in New Zealand; VTM in Belgium; Nova in Czechia and Slovakia; FanDuel TV in the United States and Brazil; Canal Plus in Poland; AMC Network in Hungary; Zonasport in Croatia; TV3 in the Baltic states; Arena Sport in Serbia, Bosnia and Herzegovina, Montenegro, North Macedonia, Kosovo; Setanta Sports in Eastern Europe and Central Asia; and BeIN Sports in the Middle East and North Africa. Matches on stage two aired on the PDC's streaming service PDCTV, as well as DAZN, VTM, and Viaplay. Stages three to eight aired on DAZN and PDCTV.

== Participants ==
The 126 Tour Card holders competing in the tournament had a staggered entry based on their PDC Order of Merit ranking on 26 February 2026. They were joined by the top eight non-qualified players from both the 2025 Challenge Tour and Development Tour Orders of Merit, as well as 16 amateur qualifiers.

Viktor Tingström and Danny van Trijp both withdrew from the tournament due to personal reasons. Van Trijp's scheduled opponent Scott Campbell received a bye to the second round, while the winner of a first-round tie between Lewis Pearse and Niall Culleton received a bye to the third round due to Tingstrom's withdrawal. Matthias Ehlers also withdrew due to injury, meaning his scheduled opponent Marvin Kraft received a bye to the second round.

=== Tour Card holders ranked 1–32 (receiving byes into fourth round) ===
1. Luke Littler (ENG) (champion)
2. Luke Humphries (ENG)
3. Gian van Veen (NED)
4. Michael van Gerwen (NED)
5. Jonny Clayton (WAL)
6. Stephen Bunting (ENG)
7. Gary Anderson (SCO)
8. James Wade (ENG) (runner-up)
9. Josh Rock (NIR)
10. Gerwyn Price (WAL)
11. Danny Noppert (NED)
12. Chris Dobey (ENG)
13. Ryan Searle (ENG)
14. Nathan Aspinall (ENG)
15. Ross Smith (ENG)
16. Martin Schindler (GER)
17. Jermaine Wattimena (NED)
18. Damon Heta (AUS)
19. Mike De Decker (BEL)
20. Rob Cross (ENG)
21. Luke Woodhouse (ENG)
22. Dave Chisnall (ENG)
23. Daryl Gurney (NIR)
24. Wessel Nijman (NED)
25. Ryan Joyce (ENG)
26. Dimitri Van den Bergh (BEL)
27. Krzysztof Ratajski (POL)
28. Ritchie Edhouse (ENG)
29. Cameron Menzies (SCO)
30. Dirk van Duijvenbode (NED)
31. Andrew Gilding (ENG)
32. Michael Smith (ENG)

=== Tour Card holders ranked 33–64 (receiving byes into third round) ===
33. Peter Wright (SCO)
34. Ricardo Pietreczko (GER)
35. Joe Cullen (ENG)
36. Raymond van Barneveld (NED)
37. Kevin Doets (NED)
38. Martin Lukeman (ENG)
39. Callan Rydz (ENG)
40. Niels Zonneveld (NED)
41. Ricky Evans (ENG)
42. William O'Connor (IRL)
43. Brendan Dolan (NIR)
44. Scott Williams (ENG)
45. Madars Razma (LAT)
46. Gabriel Clemens (GER)
47. Mickey Mansell (IRL)
48. Connor Scutt (ENG)
49. Jeffrey de Graaf (SWE)
50. James Hurrell (ENG)
51. Justin Hood (ENG)
52. Alan Soutar (SCO)
53. Niko Springer (GER)
54. Ian White (ENG)
55. Mensur Suljović (AUT)
56. Ryan Meikle (ENG)
57. Richard Veenstra (NED)
58. Keane Barry (IRL)
59. Thibault Tricole (FRA)
60. Nick Kenny (WAL)
61. Kim Huybrechts (BEL)
62. Lukas Wenig (GER)
63. Karel Sedláček (CZE)
64. Mario Vandenbogaerde (BEL)

=== Tour Card holders ranked 65–96 (receiving byes into second round) ===
65. Robert Owen (WAL)
66. Bradley Brooks (ENG)
67. Cam Crabtree (ENG)
68. Wesley Plaisier (NED)
69. Sebastian Białecki (POL)
70. Max Hopp (GER)
71. Adam Lipscombe (ENG)
72. Cor Dekker (NOR)
73. Dominik Grüllich (GER)
74. Darryl Pilgrim (ENG)
75. Tom Bissell (ENG)
76. Maik Kuivenhoven (NED)
77. Andy Boulton (SCO)
78. Tavis Dudeney (ENG)
79. Christian Kist (NED)
80. Jim Long (CAN)
81. Oskar Lukasiak (SWE)
82. Thomas Lovely (ENG)
83. Leon Weber (GER)
84. ~~Viktor Tingström~~ (SWE) (withdrew)
85. Marvin van Velzen (NED)
86. Dennie Olde Kalter (NED)
87. Adam Warner (ENG)
88. Greg Ritchie (SCO)
89. Adam Paxton (ENG)
90. Adam Gawlas (CZE)
91. Maximilian Czerwinski (GER)
92. Shane McGuirk (IRL)
93. Jimmy van Schie (NED)
94. Stefaan Henderyck (BEL)
95. Tytus Kanik (POL)
96. Beau Greaves (ENG)

=== Tour Card holders ranked 97–128 (starting in first round) ===
97. Cristo Reyes (ESP)
98. Kai Gotthardt (GER)
99. David Sharp (SCO)
100. Rusty-Jake Rodriguez (AUT)
101. Carl Sneyd (ENG)
102. Tom Sykes (ENG)
103. Owen Bates (ENG)
104. Charlie Manby (ENG)
105. Jurjen van der Velde (NED)
106. Stephen Burton (ENG)
107. Pero Ljubić (CRO)
108. Stefan Bellmont (SUI)
109. Rhys Griffin (WAL)
110. Alexander Merkx (NED)
111. Jeffrey de Zwaan (NED)
112. Darius Labanauskas (LIT)
113. Niall Culleton (IRL)
114. Samuel Price (ENG)
115. Arno Merk (GER)
116. Marvin Kraft (GER)
117. Stephen Rosney (IRL)
118. Mervyn King (ENG)
119. Adam Leek (AUS)
120. Jeffrey Sparidaans (NED)
121. Chris Landman (NED)
122. Benjamin Pratnemer (SLO)
123. Pascal Rupprecht (GER)
124. Yorick Hofkens (GER)
125. Sietse Lap (NED)
126. Tyler Thorpe (ENG)
127. Filip Bereza (POL)
128. ~~Matthias Ehlers~~ (GER) (withdrew)

=== PDC Development Tour qualifiers (starting in first round) ===
The top eight players from the 2025 PDC Development Tour who did not have a Tour Card for the 2026 season qualified for the first round.

1. Jamai van den Herik (NED)
2. Ryan Branley (ENG)
3. James Beeton (ENG)
4. Jenson Walker (ENG)
5. Jannis Barkhausen (GER)
6. Patrik Williams (ENG)
7. Nathan Potter (ENG)
8. Henry Coates (ENG)

=== PDC Challenge Tour qualifiers (starting in first round) ===
The top eight players from the 2025 PDC Challenge Tour who did not have a Tour Card for the 2026 season qualified for the first round.

1. Ted Evetts (ENG)
2. Michael Unterbuchner (GER)
3. Jack Tweddell (ENG)
4. Sam Spivey (ENG)
5. Scott Waites (ENG)
6. Scott Campbell (SCO)
7. ~~Danny van Trijp~~ (NED) (withdrew)
8. Graham Hall (ENG)

=== Amateur qualifiers (starting in first round) ===
16 amateur qualifiers were held, with eight players qualifying through 'PDC in the Community' events, and the other eight qualifying through events at Rileys venues.

PDC in the Community qualifiers

- Jack Todd (ENG) (Fleetwood)
- Clive Langford (WAL) (Newport)
- Kyle Gilding (ENG) (Syston)
- Callum Francis (ENG) (Kings Worthy)
- Simon Stevenson (ENG) (Plymouth)
- Graham Usher (ENG) (Worksop)
- Aden Kirk (ENG) (Alfreton)
- Samuel Whittaker (ENG) (Enderby)

Rileys qualifiers

- Neil Wild (ENG) (Solihull)
- Sean Ryan (SCO) (Aberdeen)
- Daniel Lee (ENG) (Coventry)
- Oliver King (ENG) (Norwich)
- Callum Goffin (WAL) (Chorlton)
- Ron Meulenkamp (NED) (Liverpool)
- Lewis Pearse (ENG) (Harlow)
- Jake Eichen (ENG) (London Victoria)

== Summary ==
=== Opening rounds ===
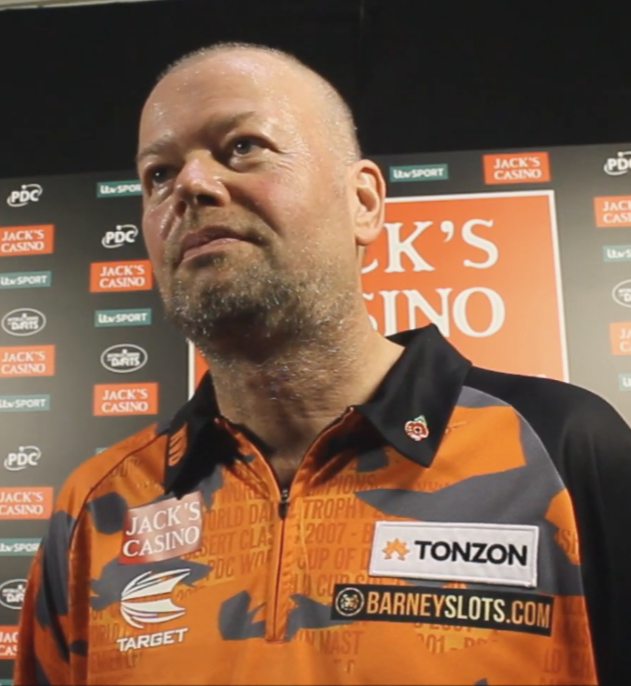
Two-time UK Open champion Raymond van Barneveld (pictured in 2019) came back from 5–2 down to defeat Karel Sedláček 6–5 in the third round, before being eliminated in his next match.

The first, second, and third rounds were played in the afternoon session on 6 March. In the first round, Challenge Tour qualifier Sam Spivey earned a 6–2 win over 16-year-old Kyle Gilding, the youngest player in the tournament, while 62-year-old amateur qualifier Clive Langford lost in a deciding leg to Stephen Rosney. David Sharp rebounded from 5–2 down to take Adam Leek to a deciding leg where Leek claimed a 6–5 victory, ending the match with a three-dart average of 99.56. From 4–1 behind, amateur qualifier Samuel Whittaker won five consecutive legs to defeat former World Matchplay semi-finalist Jeffrey de Zwaan 6–4. Scott Waites, the 2010 Grand Slam champion and two-time BDO world champion, lost 6–4 to Jeffrey Sparidaans. Tyler Thorpe achieved the only whitewash win of the first round, beating Pero Ljubić 6–0. Amateur qualifiers Jack Todd, Oliver King, and Ron Meulenkamp also progressed past the first round. Scott Campbell and Marvin Kraft received byes to the second round following the withdrawals of Danny van Trijp and Matthias Ehlers. Niall Culleton, who defeated Lewis Pearse 6–3, went through to the third round due to his second-round opponent Viktor Tingström's withdrawal.

In the second round, three-time women's world champion Beau Greaves lost her opening match 6–4 to Darryl Pilgrim. Jimmy van Schie and Shane McGuirk, the two previous WDF world champions, were eliminated by Tom Bissell and Thomas Lovely, respectively. Sebastian Białecki took a 5–1 lead against 2012 BDO world champion Christian Kist but conceded the next four legs; however, Białecki prevailed in the deciding leg. Pascal Rupprecht also halted a comeback from 5–1 down by Cam Crabtree, winning 6–5. Michael Unterbuchner and Development Tour qualifier Patrik Williams both overturned 5–2 deficits to defeat Maik Kuivenhoven and Cor Dekker. Adam Gawlas, Jim Long and Adam Lipscombe earned respective whitewash victories against Tavis Dudeney, Tytus Kanik and Todd; Gawlas averaged 100.20 in his win. Amateur qualifiers Todd, Whittaker, King, and Meulenkamp were all eliminated in the second round.

In the third round, Karel Sedláček missed five match darts to defeat two-time UK Open champion and five-time world champion Raymond van Barneveld, who came back from 5–2 down to win 6–5. Following Charlie Manby's 6–4 victory over James Hurrell, the pair were involved in an altercation where the referee had to intervene. In a post-match interview, Manby suggested that Hurrell objected to his loud celebrations during the contest, insisting that he and Hurrell were "mates" and that there are "no friends on the oche". Ricky Evans and William O'Connor recorded averages over 100 in their respective wins against Brendan Dolan and Ryan Meikle. The 2017 UK Open champion and two-time world champion Peter Wright began his campaign by defeating Darius Labanauskas 6–3. Development Tour qualifier Henry Coates advanced to the fourth round by beating Michael Unterbuchner 6–4, while Challenge Tour qualifier Scott Campbell also progressed by defeating Ian White 6–2. Niall Culleton capitalised on his bye to the third round, winning 6–4 against Owen Bates to reach the last 64.

=== Fourth round ===
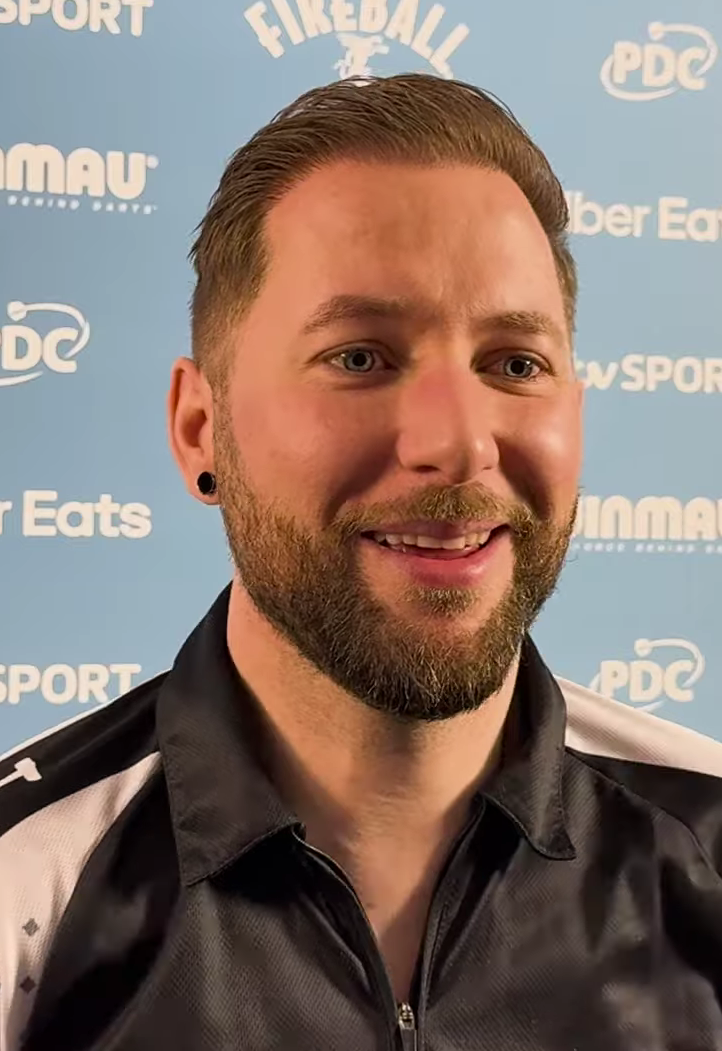
The 2022 champion Danny Noppert (pictured in 2025) hit a nine-dart finish to complete a 10–4 win over Dimitri Van den Bergh in the fourth round.

The fourth round was played in the evening session on 6 March, where the world's top 32 players entered the tournament. The defending champion and world number one Luke Littler faced Damon Heta in his opening tie, a rematch of their 2024 UK Open quarter-final meeting. Littler, who had won a night of the Premier League the day prior, landed a 170 checkout to go 7–2 ahead before eventually winning 10–3, avenging his 2024 loss to Heta. Three-time UK Open and world champion Michael van Gerwen initially trailed the 2019 champion Nathan Aspinall 4–2, but later secured a 10–8 victory. Van Gerwen commented that he gave Aspinall too many chances during the match, labelling his opponent "a fighter". World number two Luke Humphries established a 7–3 lead against Luke Woodhouse, including a run of three consecutive legs that saw him hit checkouts of 144 and 118. He then claimed another three in a row, converting a 116 checkout to complete a 10–3 win. World number three Gian van Veen was the highest-ranked player to get knocked out in the fourth round, losing 10–7 to 2018 world champion Rob Cross. The 2022 champion Danny Noppert hit a nine-dart finish in the final leg of his match against 2024 champion Dimitri Van den Bergh, sealing a 10–4 victory. The loss for Van den Bergh resulted in him dropping out of the world's top 32 on the PDC Order of Merit, falling to world number 37.

Peter Wright continued his run by defeating Cameron Menzies 10–6 in an all-Scottish tie, while Raymond van Barneveld lost 10–1 to fellow Dutchman Wessel Nijman. The 2018 champion and two-time world champion Gary Anderson registered a three-dart average of 107.42 on his way to beating Dirk van Duijvenbode 10–6. William O'Connor lost in a deciding leg to Josh Rock, whose Northern Irish World Cup partner Daryl Gurney defeated Niels Zonneveld 10–7. Three-time champion James Wade survived a deciding leg of his own as he triumphed against Chris Dobey, making him one of six former champions to advance to the fifth round, alongside Littler, Van Gerwen, Noppert, Wright, and Anderson. Gabriel Clemens landed a 145 checkout to beat Richard Veenstra 10–9, joining Martin Schindler, Dominik Grüllich and Kai Gotthardt as the four German players in the fifth round.

=== Fifth and sixth rounds ===
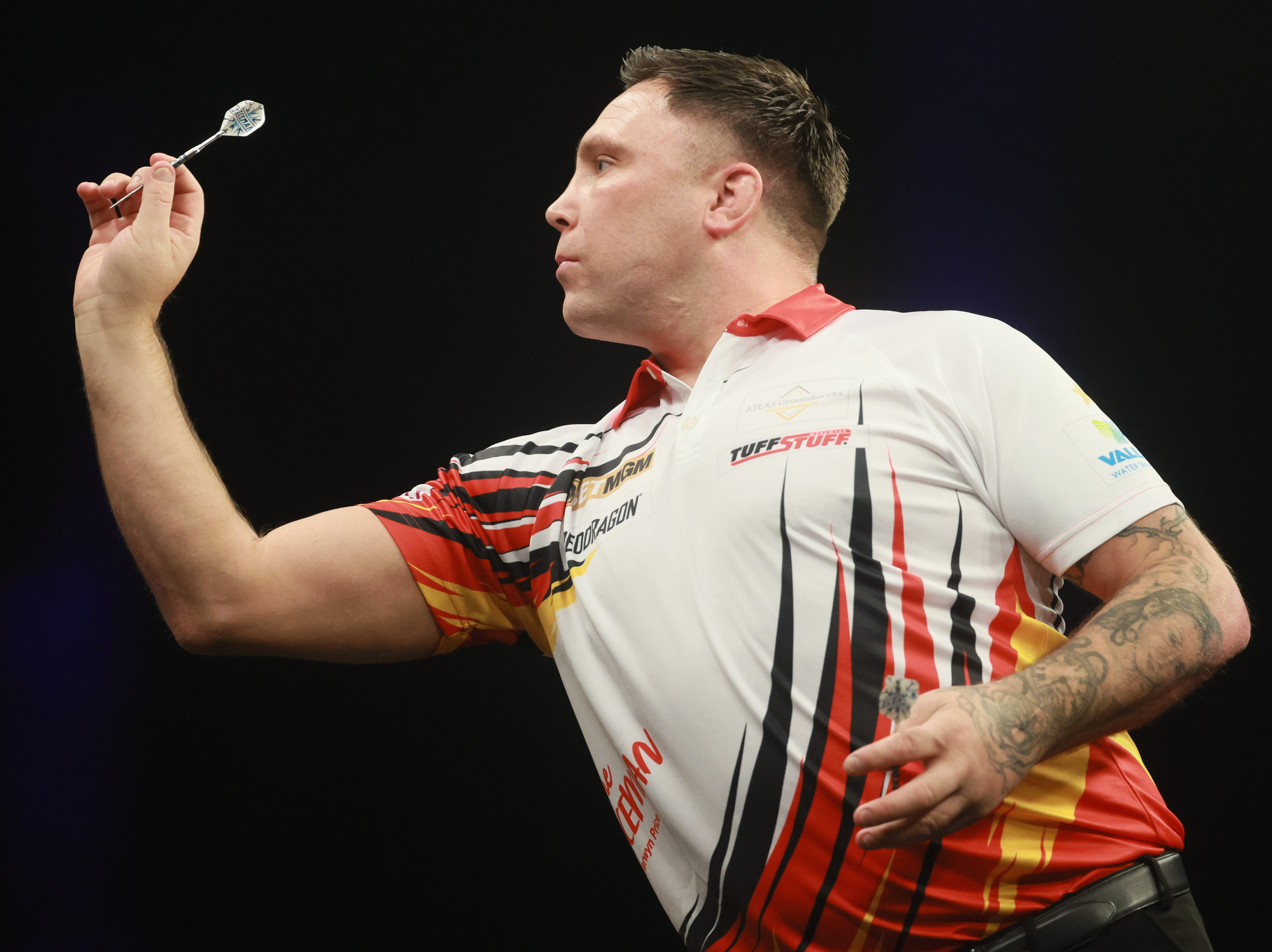
Gerwyn Price (pictured in 2025) came from 9–4 behind to defeat Keane Barry 10–9 in the sixth round.

The fifth round (afternoon session) and sixth round (evening session) were played on 7 March. After getting past Kevin Doets 10–8, Luke Littler faced Gary Anderson, who averaged 105.80 to defeat Martin Schindler 10–7. Anderson took the first leg but Littler then took a 4–1 lead, extending it to 7–3 before eventually securing a 10–5 victory. Danny Noppert followed a 10–2 win over Peter Wright by eliminating Luke Humphries, triumphing 10–6 in his first major victory over the world number two. On his title chances, Noppert said: "I have lifted it once, why not twice?" Celebrating his 41st birthday, Gerwyn Price beat Wessel Nijman 10–5 in the fifth round before producing a comeback from 9–4 down to defeat Keane Barry 10–9. "It was a frustrating game at times," commented Price, who said he was thankful to get through the match and that the crowd's support for him was "like playing in Wales".

James Wade beat Gabriel Clemens 10–2 and advanced to the quarter-finals by defeating fellow three-time champion Michael van Gerwen 10–3, averaging 105.83 in the latter contest. Premier League leader Jonny Clayton hit eight maximums on his way to beating Martin Lukeman 10–7, the same scoreline as his fifth-round win over Darryl Pilgrim. Rob Cross defeated former World Grand Prix champions Mike De Decker and Daryl Gurney to reach his first major quarter-final since November 2024; De Decker missed a match dart as Cross overturned a 9–7 deficit to win 10–9. Josh Rock achieved consecutive 10–7 victories against Dominik Grüllich and fellow Premier League player Stephen Bunting, while Krzysztof Ratajski reached his second UK Open quarter-final with wins over Oskar Lukasiak and Ryan Searle.

=== Quarter-finals and semi-finals ===
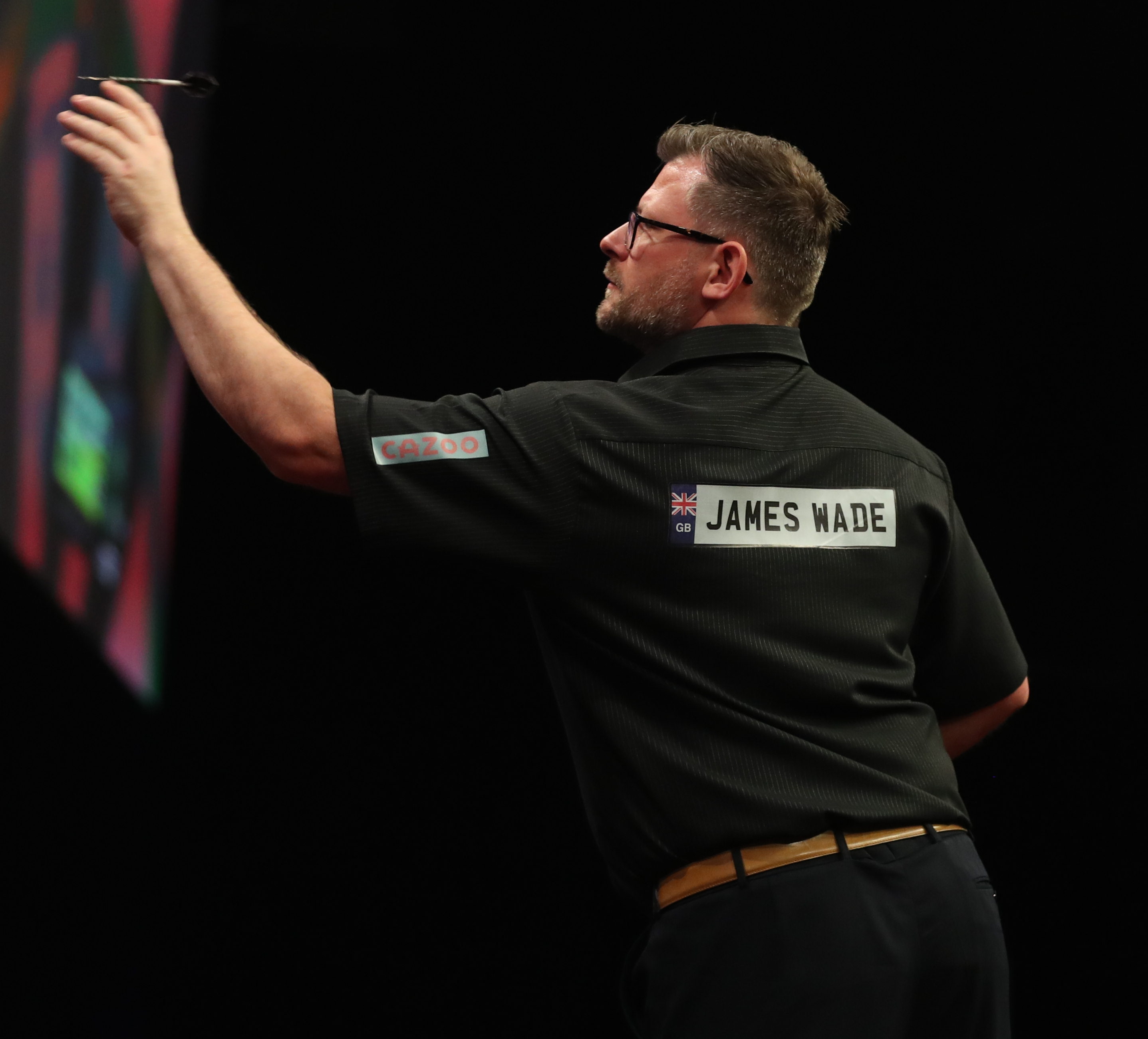
Three-time champion James Wade (pictured in 2022) reached his fifth UK Open final.

The quarter-finals (afternoon session) and semi-finals (evening session) were played on 8 March. In the quarter-finals, Josh Rock secured a place in his second consecutive UK Open semi-final by defeating Krzysztof Ratajski 10–7, having trailed 6–4 after 10 legs. James Wade landed a 107 checkout to win a deciding leg against Rob Cross. Luke Littler claimed five of the last six legs of his match against Danny Noppert, winning 10–6 to continue his title defence. To complete the final four, Gerwyn Price defeated his World Cup teammate Jonny Clayton 10–8, reaching his first UK Open semi-final since 2021.

In the semi-finals, James Wade faced Gerwyn Price and Luke Littler faced Josh Rock. Price took an early 3–2 lead over Wade, who levelled the score at 5–5 with a 136 checkout. From there, Wade took control to lead 9–5, a run of legs that included a 167 checkout. Although Price reduced his deficit to 10–8, Wade took the next leg to complete an 11–8 victory, finishing the match with 11 maximums and a three-dart average of 105.53. Rock established a 5–1 lead against Littler in the second semi-final, capitalising on Littler only hitting one of seventeen attempts at double in the early stages of the match. Littler won the next four legs to level at 5–5. Rock went two legs away from victory at 9–7 but Littler equalised once again, finding a break of throw in the next leg to lead before winning 11–9. Littler extended his unbeaten record in major semi-finals to 16, while also making it seven wins out of seven meetings against Rock.

=== Final ===
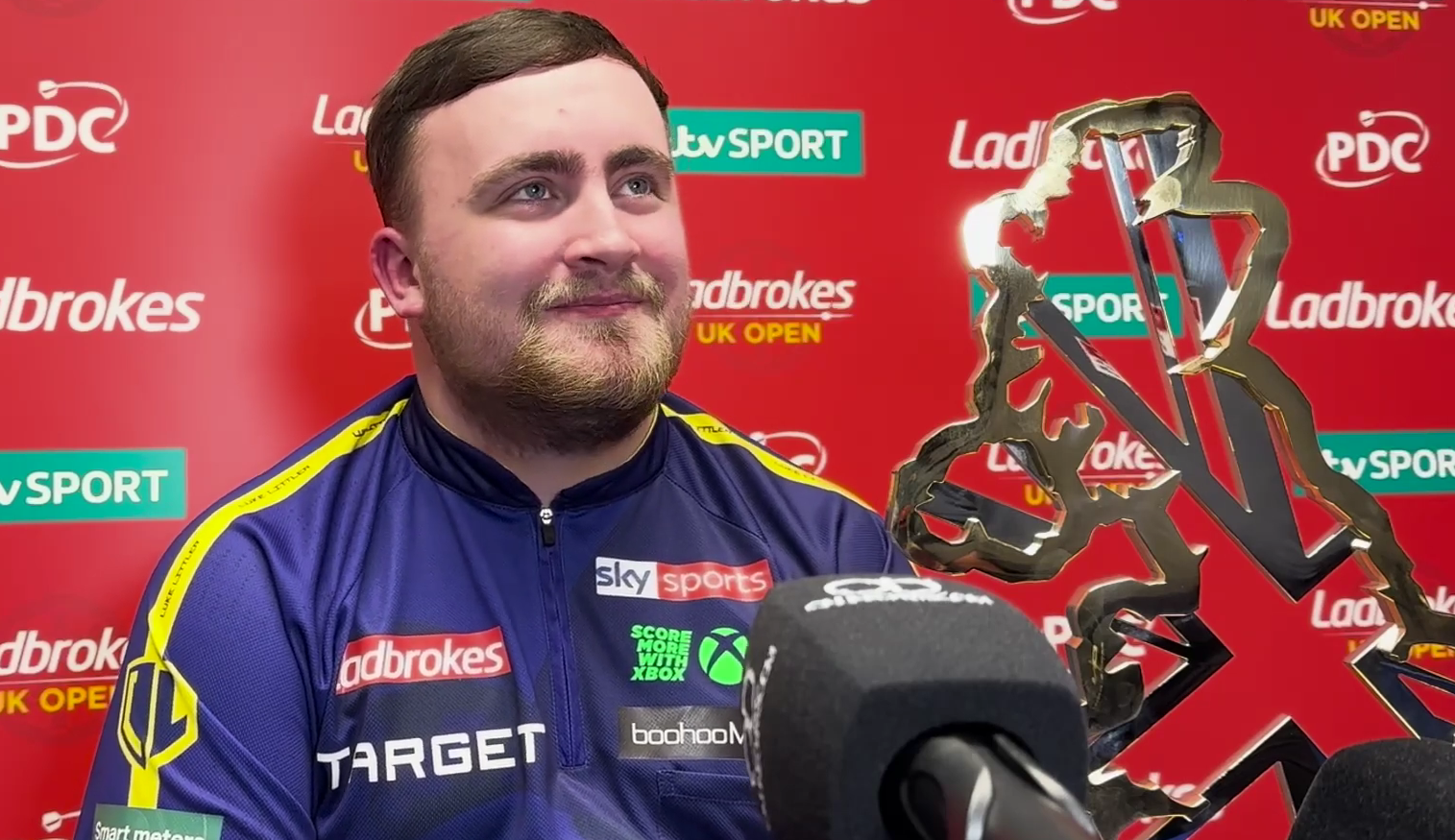
Luke Littler (pictured with the UK Open trophy in 2025) became the fourth player to defend the UK Open title.

The final between Luke Littler and James Wade was played in the evening session on 8 March. This was a rematch of the previous year's final, where Littler won his first UK Open title by defeating Wade 11–2. The pair also contested the World Matchplay final in July 2025, where Littler also triumphed. Competing in his fifth UK Open final, Wade aimed to be crowned champion for the fourth time after winning the tournament in 2008, 2011 and 2021, while Littler looked to retain his title in his second straight final.

Littler began the match by taking a 3–0 lead, but Wade levelled at 3–3 despite averaging around 80. The defending champion responded with another three-leg extension, which Wade matched for 6–6 before they traded legs to bring the score to 7–7. The match was characterised by the 12-point difference in averages between the two during the early proceedings, as Littler contrasted his 100 average with poor doubling that saw Wade keep himself in the contest. In the 15th leg, Wade missed a shot at the bullseye to take the lead, allowing Littler to convert a 116 checkout to restore initiative. He broke throw in the 16th leg and completed a run of four consecutive legs to win the match 11–7. Littler finished the final with a three-dart average of 99.58, hitting 35.48 per cent of his double attempts.

Littler defended his title to win his second UK Open, his fifth consecutive major title. The victory saw him reach a total of 16 PDC major titles, surpassing Wade in the all-time list to move into third place, behind Phil Taylor and Michael van Gerwen. He also became the fourth player to retain the UK Open, after Raymond van Barneveld, Taylor, and Van Gerwen, and was the first to achieve the feat since Van Gerwen in 2016. "It hasn't been my best tournament average-wise, but as a player you've got to dig deep," said Littler after the final. On his opponent's performance, he stated: "That is what James [Wade] does, he is always behind you and I said to him after the game that if he had hit those double tops [double 20] then it is a completely different game." Speaking in defeat, Wade said that Littler was "too good" for him at the end, commenting: "He [Littler]’s the best player in the world at the moment, and unfortunately I’ve lost to him in three finals." He added: "I'm happy to be in the final. I hate losing more than anyone, but I lost to the better player on the day."

== Draw ==
The draw for the first three rounds was announced on 2 March. The figures to the right of a player's name state their three-dart average in a match. Players in bold denote match winners.

CT = Challenge Tour
DT = Development Tour
Q = Amateur qualifier

=== Friday 6 March ===
==== First round ====
Player	Score	Player	Player	Score	Player
Stefan Bellmont 89.64	3 – **6**	**Charlie Manby** 93.78	**Sam Spivey (CT)** 89.14	**6** – 2	Kyle Gilding (Q) 78.92
**Pascal Rupprecht** 82.10	**6** – 1	Jenson Walker (DT) 75.79	Aden Kirk (Q) 90.50	4 – **6**	**Mervyn King** 89.83
**Michael Unterbuchner (CT)** 90.70	**6** – 5	Rusty-Jake Rodriguez 89.50	**Adam Leek** 99.56	**6** – 5	David Sharp 91.27
Filip Bereza 77.34	2 – **6**	**Rhys Griffin** 82.62	**Stephen Burton** 88.86	**6** – 2	Jake Eichen (Q) 77.93
**Cristo Reyes** 95.09	**6** – 3	Graham Usher (Q) 88.68	**Tyler Thorpe** 92.97	**6** – 0	Pero Ljubić 81.42
**Kai Gotthardt** 90.00	**6** – 4	Daniel Lee (Q) 76.49	**Jack Todd (Q)** 87.82	**6** – 4	Carl Sneyd 84.27
Clive Langford (Q) 76.27	5 – **6**	**Stephen Rosney** 76.66	**Alexander Merkx** 87.65	**6** – 3	Jannis Barkhausen (DT) 77.00
Sean Ryan (Q) 80.12	2 – **6**	**Tom Sykes** 83.14	**Sietse Lap** 98.49	**6** – 3	Ted Evetts (CT) 84.07
**Samuel Whittaker (Q)** 95.15	**6** – 4	Jeffrey de Zwaan 95.85	Ryan Branley (DT) 89.66	3 – **6**	**Oliver King (Q)** 90.39
**Benjamin Pratnemer** 88.72	**6** – 3	Callum Goffin (Q) 84.02	**Darius Labanauskas** 94.14	**6** – 4	Callum Francis (Q) 87.89
**Owen Bates** 98.61	**6** – 3	Yorick Hofkens 93.45	Lewis Pearse (Q) 80.42	3 – **6**	**Niall Culleton** 85.41
**Jamai van den Herik (DT)** 85.76	**6** – 3	Graham Hall (CT) 78.57	**Jurjen van der Velde** 85.74	**6** – 4	Jack Tweddell (CT) 79.33
James Beeton (DT) 84.24	5 – **6**	**Arno Merk** 84.54	~~Danny van Trijp (CT)~~ (Note: Withdrew prior to tournament.)	**bye**	**Scott Campbell (CT)**
**Ron Meulenkamp (Q)** 96.89	**6** – 2	Samuel Price 86.37	**Jeffrey Sparidaans** 96.12	**6** – 4	Scott Waites (CT) 92.75
**Patrik Williams (DT)** 91.22	**6** – 4	Simon Stevenson (Q) 88.54	~~Matthias Ehlers~~	**bye**	**Marvin Kraft**
Nathan Potter (DT) 91.24	2 – **6**	**Chris Landman** 94.44	Neil Wild (Q) 84.46	3 – **6**	**Henry Coates (DT)** 86.76

==== Second round ====
Player	Score	Player	Player	Score	Player
**Sebastian Białecki** 89.11	**6** – 5	Christian Kist 87.41	Jimmy van Schie 92.32	2 – **6**	**Tom Bissell** 94.81
**Darryl Pilgrim** 94.31	**6** – 4	Beau Greaves 88.22	**Pascal Rupprecht** 87.96	**6** – 5	Cam Crabtree 86.43
**Thomas Lovely** 85.86	**6** – 4	Shane McGuirk 87.97	**Adam Gawlas** 100.20	**6** – 0	Tavis Dudeney 89.57
Tytus Kanik 72.00	0 – **6**	**Jim Long** 79.81	**Sam Spivey (CT)** 89.00	**6** – 5	Max Hopp 87.04
**Robert Owen** 90.86	**6** – 4	Stefaan Henderyck 87.10	Maximilian Czerwinski 81.52	3 – **6**	**Darius Labanauskas** 90.33
**Greg Ritchie** 83.08	**6** – 3	Adam Leek 84.06	Jurjen van der Velde 80.82	5 – **6**	**Leon Weber** 79.96
Wesley Plaisier 86.62	4 – **6**	**Owen Bates** 93.71	Rhys Griffin 80.58	2 – **6**	**Oskar Lukasiak** 77.31
**Henry Coates (DT)** 89.48	**6** – 4	Adam Paxton 88.07	**Charlie Manby** 95.80	**6** – 2	Tyler Thorpe 89.71
~~Viktor Tingström~~	**bye**	**Niall Culleton**	Ron Meulenkamp (Q) 97.80	5 – **6**	**Adam Warner** 92.38
**Dominik Grüllich** 91.24	**6** – 1	Jamai van den Herik (DT) 85.46	Sietse Lap 88.21	1 – **6**	**Cristo Reyes** 96.31
**Patrik Williams (DT)** 88.77	**6** – 5	Cor Dekker 89.16	Dennie Olde Kalter 83.48	1 – **6**	**Scott Campbell (CT)** 80.71
**Alexander Merkx** 90.70	**6** – 2	Marvin van Velzen 88.67	**Jeffrey Sparidaans** 91.47	**6** – 3	Chris Landman 85.01
**Andy Boulton** 93.71	**6** – 4	Mervyn King 89.88	Maik Kuivenhoven 88.46	5 – **6**	**Michael Unterbuchner (CT)** 92.33
**Benjamin Pratnemer** 95.43	**6** – 1	Samuel Whittaker (Q) 82.86	Marvin Kraft 88.87	2 – **6**	**Kai Gotthardt** 91.00
**Adam Lipscombe** 91.09	**6** – 0	Jack Todd (Q) 83.31	Oliver King (Q) 80.57	5 – **6**	**Bradley Brooks** 81.79
Arno Merk 85.37	4 – **6**	**Tom Sykes** 93.00	**Stephen Rosney** 93.84	**6** – 4	Stephen Burton 91.48

==== Third round ====
Player	Score	Player	Player	Score	Player
Karel Sedláček 85.74	5 – **6**	**Raymond van Barneveld** 85.75	**Ricky Evans** 102.49	**6** – 2	Brendan Dolan 84.81
**Peter Wright** 91.97	**6** – 3	Darius Labanauskas 84.07	**Kevin Doets** 92.10	**6** – 4	Ricardo Pietreczko 90.50
**Gabriel Clemens** 98.33	**6** – 4	Sebastian Białecki 95.23	Kim Huybrechts 94.85	5 – **6**	**Keane Barry** 91.28
Pascal Rupprecht 91.92	3 – **6**	**Joe Cullen** 98.29	Lukas Wenig 86.40	2 – **6**	**Mensur Suljović** 92.22
**Niels Zonneveld** 97.13	**6** – 3	Tom Bissell 96.46	Jeffrey Sparidaans 80.03	3 – **6**	**Connor Scutt** 96.61
Sam Spivey (CT) 84.97	5 – **6**	**Alexander Merkx** 89.13	Adam Warner 89.88	1 – **6**	**Jeffrey de Graaf** 95.91
**Jim Long** 86.86	**6** – 5	Callan Rydz 90.92	Robert Owen 84.15	5 – **6**	**Darryl Pilgrim** 94.40
Niko Springer 85.52	4 – **6**	**Kai Gotthardt** 87.69	Ryan Meikle 90.04	4 – **6**	**William O'Connor** 101.85
Nick Kenny 80.04	5 – **6**	**Adam Lipscombe** 82.15	**Andy Boulton** 84.91	**6** – 4	Patrik Williams (DT) 87.40
Michael Unterbuchner (CT) 88.85	4 – **6**	**Henry Coates (DT)** 91.20	Mario Vandenbogaerde 82.37	5 – **6**	**Leon Weber** 83.81
Alan Soutar 92.04	4 – **6**	**Richard Veenstra** 95.68	**Greg Ritchie** 87.15	**6** – 5	Mickey Mansell 91.05
**Thibault Tricole** 89.44	**6** – 4	Stephen Rosney 91.81	**Tom Sykes** 93.62	**6** – 4	Cristo Reyes 89.69
**Madars Razma** 87.60	**6** – 2	Adam Gawlas 84.82	**Dominik Grüllich** 91.60	**6** – 4	Justin Hood 94.32
Bradley Brooks 84.87	3 – **6**	**Oskar Lukasiak** 88.74	James Hurrell 96.83	4 – **6**	**Charlie Manby** 99.27
Thomas Lovely 83.79	4 – **6**	**Martin Lukeman** 89.39	Ian White 84.54	2 – **6**	**Scott Campbell (CT)** 86.84
**Niall Culleton** 82.74	**6** – 4	Owen Bates 80.15	**Benjamin Pratnemer** 82.50	**6** – 4	Scott Williams 86.29

==== Fourth round ====
Player	Score	Player	Player	Score	Player
**Mensur Suljović** 94.30	**10** – 5	Jermaine Wattimena 89.01	**Michael Smith** 82.42	**10** – 8	Leon Weber 84.41
**Oskar Lukasiak** 89.71	**10** – 7	Benjamin Pratnemer 88.71	Henry Coates (DT) 78.37	2 – **10**	**Keane Barry** 97.11
Joe Cullen 91.88	8 – **10**	**Martin Schindler** 97.36	Greg Ritchie 81.90	3 – **10**	**Gerwyn Price** 95.88
**Martin Lukeman** 91.22	**10** – 6	Ritchie Edhouse 87.89	**Ross Smith** 95.89	**10** – 4	Andrew Gilding 88.48
**Kai Gotthardt** 90.09	**10** – 8	Tom Sykes 91.12	Richard Veenstra 90.99	9 – **10**	**Gabriel Clemens** 92.09
Raymond van Barneveld 88.28	1 – **10**	**Wessel Nijman** 102.39	Connor Scutt 86.12	5 – **10**	**Darryl Pilgrim** 93.05
**Josh Rock** 98.42	**10** – 9	William O'Connor 96.82	**Kevin Doets** 98.26	**10** – 5	Jeffrey de Graaf 92.57
**Stephen Bunting** 92.25	**10** – 5	Thibault Tricole 91.09	**Daryl Gurney** 94.32	**10** – 7	Niels Zonneveld 93.01
Dirk van Duijvenbode 101.59	6 – **10**	**Gary Anderson** 107.42	**Ryan Joyce** 89.53	**10** – 6	Charlie Manby 98.45
Chris Dobey 102.90	9 – **10**	**James Wade** 95.46	Niall Culleton 82.49	8 – **10**	**Dominik Grüllich** 90.14
**Krzysztof Ratajski** 95.82	**10** – 4	Ricky Evans 90.26	Dimitri Van den Bergh 89.94	4 – **10**	**Danny Noppert** 92.22
**Luke Littler** 94.81	**10** – 3	Damon Heta 90.25	Jim Long 85.57	9 – **10**	**Madars Razma** 85.30
Luke Woodhouse 97.53	3 – **10**	**Luke Humphries** 105.16	**Rob Cross** 101.78	**10** – 7	Gian van Veen 101.60
Cameron Menzies 92.55	6 – **10**	**Peter Wright** 95.74	**Michael van Gerwen** 101.89	**10** – 8	Nathan Aspinall 97.12
**Jonny Clayton** 90.18	**10** – 2	Alexander Merkx 85.71	Andy Boulton 88.73	7 – **10**	**Ryan Searle** 94.82
**Mike De Decker** 95.33	**10** – 8	Adam Lipscombe 91.88	**Dave Chisnall** 91.77	**10** – 5	Scott Campbell (CT) 87.19

=== Saturday 7 March ===
==== Fifth round ====
Player	Score	Player	Player	Score	Player
Ross Smith 92.20	8 – **10**	**Daryl Gurney** 88.74	Mensur Suljović 90.92	2 – **10**	**Stephen Bunting** 98.53
Kevin Doets 97.22	8 – **10**	**Luke Littler** 93.68	**Gary Anderson** 105.80	**10** – 7	Martin Schindler 94.05
**Josh Rock** 92.72	**10** – 7	Dominik Grüllich 87.72	Darryl Pilgrim 90.09	7 – **10**	**Jonny Clayton** 96.69
Peter Wright 88.27	2 – **10**	**Danny Noppert** 99.97	Kai Gotthardt 89.30	6 – **10**	**Michael van Gerwen** 95.89
Ryan Joyce 87.50	7 – **10**	**Keane Barry** 89.70	**Martin Lukeman** 88.77	**10** – 3	Madars Razma 83.30
Gabriel Clemens 88.09	2 – **10**	**James Wade** 90.85	**Ryan Searle** 92.32	**10** – 9	Michael Smith 93.06
Oskar Lukasiak 87.41	5 – **10**	**Krzysztof Ratajski** 93.77	**Luke Humphries** 103.65	**10** – 4	Dave Chisnall 86.41
Wessel Nijman 100.11	5 – **10**	**Gerwyn Price** 101.80	Mike De Decker 92.55	9 – **10**	**Rob Cross** 96.39

==== Sixth round ====
Player	Score	Player	Player	Score	Player
Gary Anderson 95.33	5 – **10**	**Luke Littler** 102.48	Daryl Gurney 85.43	6 – **10**	**Rob Cross** 95.48
Martin Lukeman 89.01	7 – **10**	**Jonny Clayton** 93.69	**Gerwyn Price** 100.43	**10** – 9	Keane Barry 99.69
Michael van Gerwen 100.45	3 – **10**	**James Wade** 105.83	Stephen Bunting 89.16	7 – **10**	**Josh Rock** 93.75
Luke Humphries 99.40	6 – **10**	**Danny Noppert** 95.08	Ryan Searle 85.79	5 – **10**	**Krzysztof Ratajski** 96.25

=== Sunday 8 March ===
==== Quarter-finals ====
Player	Score	Player
Krzysztof Ratajski 97.29	7 – **10**	**Josh Rock** 99.06
**James Wade** 91.03	**10** – 9	Rob Cross 89.59
**Luke Littler** 104.47	**10** – 6	Danny Noppert 98.66
Jonny Clayton 96.62	8 – **10**	**Gerwyn Price** 98.26

==== Semi-finals and Final ====
**Semi-finals**
**James Wade** 105.53	**11**
Gerwyn Price 101.39	8
**Luke Littler** 100.36	**11**
Josh Rock 94.00	9

**Final**
James Wade 89.49	7
**Luke Littler** 99.58	**11**
