= List of players with a 2026 PDC Tour Card =

The Professional Darts Corporation (PDC) grants a Tour Card every year to 128 darts players, which allows them to compete in all PDC Pro Tour tournaments, those being all Players Championships and European Tours (or qualifiers to the latter events in case the player has not automatically qualified). Additionally, holding a PDC Tour Card offers further benefits such as automatic qualifications for the UK Open or participation in the qualifying rounds for the World Darts Championship, Grand Slam and World Masters, among others.

PDC Tour Cards are valid for two years. The top 64 players in the PDC Order of Merit (OoM) and the players who won a card last year automatically receive Tour Cards for the rest of the year. Tour Cards can be removed if any player resigns it, do not compete in any Pro Tour event during their first year of their card, or have been banned for a period longer than the remaining duration of the card.

The top two players from last year's secondary tours, the Challenge Tour and the Development Tour, along with the players who earned a Tour Card at this year's UK & European Q-Schools, are awarded two-year cards. All these players have their Order of Merit rankings reset to zero at the beginning of the season.

== List of players ==
The following is the list of darts players with a 2026 PDC Tour Card:

No.	Country	Player	Prize money	Qualified through
1	England	Luke Littler	£2,770,500	Top 64 of Order of Merit
2	England	Luke Humphries	£1,172,000	Top 64 of Order of Merit
3	Netherlands	Gian van Veen	£912,500	Top 64 of Order of Merit
4	Netherlands	Michael van Gerwen	£691,250	Top 64 of Order of Merit
5	Wales	Jonny Clayton	£625,000	Top 64 of Order of Merit
6	Scotland	Gary Anderson	£609,500	Top 64 of Order of Merit
7	England	Stephen Bunting	£593,750	Top 64 of Order of Merit
8	England	Ryan Searle	£568,000	Top 64 of Order of Merit
9	Northern Ireland	Josh Rock	£555,500	Top 64 of Order of Merit
10	Netherlands	Danny Noppert	£550,750	Top 64 of Order of Merit
11	England	James Wade	£544,250	Top 64 of Order of Merit
12	Wales	Gerwyn Price	£521,000	Top 64 of Order of Merit
13	England	Chris Dobey	£505,250	Top 64 of Order of Merit
14	England	Nathan Aspinall	£460,000	Top 64 of Order of Merit
15	Germany	Martin Schindler	£458,250	Top 64 of Order of Merit
16	England	Ross Smith	£447,750	Top 64 of Order of Merit
17	Australia	Damon Heta	£439,000	Top 64 of Order of Merit
18	Netherlands	Jermaine Wattimena	£423,000	Top 64 of Order of Merit
19	Belgium	Mike De Decker	£413,500	Top 64 of Order of Merit
20	England	Rob Cross	£389,000	Top 64 of Order of Merit
21	England	Luke Woodhouse	£383,000	Top 64 of Order of Merit
22	England	Dave Chisnall	£362,500	Top 64 of Order of Merit
23	Northern Ireland	Daryl Gurney	£346,500	Top 64 of Order of Merit
24	England	Ryan Joyce	£345,000	Top 64 of Order of Merit
25	Belgium	Dimitri Van den Bergh	£335,250	Top 64 of Order of Merit
26	Scotland	Cameron Menzies	£325,250	Top 64 of Order of Merit
27	England	Ritchie Edhouse	£324,000	Top 64 of Order of Merit
28	Poland	Krzysztof Ratajski	£322,500	Top 64 of Order of Merit
29	Netherlands	Wessel Nijman	£320,750	Top 64 of Order of Merit
30	Netherlands	Dirk van Duijvenbode	£319,750	Top 64 of Order of Merit
31	Scotland	Peter Wright	£311,500	Top 64 of Order of Merit
32	England	Michael Smith	£303,500	Top 64 of Order of Merit
33	England	Andrew Gilding	£300,000	Top 64 of Order of Merit
34	Germany	Ricardo Pietreczko	£293,000	Top 64 of Order of Merit
35	England	Joe Cullen	£275,000	Top 64 of Order of Merit
36	Netherlands	Raymond van Barneveld	£246,000	Top 64 of Order of Merit
37	England	Martin Lukeman	£226,500	Top 64 of Order of Merit
38	Netherlands	Kevin Doets	£219,000	Top 64 of Order of Merit
39	England	Callan Rydz	£189,000	Top 64 of Order of Merit
40	England	Ricky Evans	£188,000	Top 64 of Order of Merit
41	Ireland	Brendan Dolan	£183,250	Top 64 of Order of Merit
42	Netherlands	Niels Zonneveld	£182,750	Top 64 of Order of Merit
43	Ireland	William O'Connor	£182,250	Top 64 of Order of Merit
44	England	Scott Williams	£173,750	Top 64 of Order of Merit
45	Latvia	Madars Razma	£162,500	Top 64 of Order of Merit
46	Ireland	Mickey Mansell	£159,250	Top 64 of Order of Merit
47	Germany	Gabriel Clemens	£154,250	Top 64 of Order of Merit
48	England	James Hurrell	£147,000	Top 64 of Order of Merit
49	England	Connor Scutt	£144,750	Top 64 of Order of Merit
50	England	Justin Hood	£139,750	Top 64 of Order of Merit
51	Sweden	Jeffrey de Graaf	£139,500	Top 64 of Order of Merit
52	England	Ian White	£134,500	Top 64 of Order of Merit
53	Scotland	Alan Soutar	£131,500	Top 64 of Order of Merit
54	Germany	Niko Springer	£129,750	Top 64 of Order of Merit
55	Austria	Mensur Suljović	£127,750	Top 64 of Order of Merit
56	England	Ryan Meikle	£125,500	Top 64 of Order of Merit
57	Netherlands	Richard Veenstra	£117,250	Top 64 of Order of Merit
58	Ireland	Keane Barry	£116,250	Top 64 of Order of Merit
59	Wales	Nick Kenny	£114,500	Top 64 of Order of Merit
60	Belgium	Kim Huybrechts	£108,000	Top 64 of Order of Merit
61	France	Thibault Tricole	£106,250	Top 64 of Order of Merit
62	Germany	Lukas Wenig	£101,250	Top 64 of Order of Merit
63	Wales	Rob Owen	£95,500	Top 64 of Order of Merit
64	Belgium	Mario Vandenbogaerde	£94,750	Top 64 of Order of Merit
65	Czech Republic	Karel Sedláček	£83,000	2025 Q-School
66	England	Bradley Brooks	£78,750	2025 Q-School
67	England	Cam Crabtree	£73,000	2025 Q-School
68	Netherlands	Wesley Plaisier	£68,500	2024 Challenge Tour
69	Poland	Sebastian Białecki	£63,750	2024 Development Tour
70	Germany	Max Hopp	£58,250	2025 Q-School
71	England	Adam Lipscombe	£56,750	2025 Q-School
72	Germany	Dominik Grüllich	£44,250	2025 Q-School
73	Norway	Cor Dekker	£41,250	2025 Q-School
74	Netherlands	Maik Kuivenhoven	£26,000	2025 Q-School
75	Scotland	Andy Boulton	£26,000	2025 Q-School
76	England	Tavis Dudeney	£24,500	2025 Q-School
77	Sweden	Oskar Lukasiak	£24,500	2025 Q-School
78	England	Darryl Pilgrim	£24,250	2025 Q-School
79	England	Tom Bissell	£20,250	2025 Q-School
80	Netherlands	Christian Kist	£20,000	2024 Challenge Tour
81	Germany	Leon Weber	£19,750	2025 Q-School
82	Netherlands	Dennie Olde Kalter	£18,500	2025 Q-School
83	Canada	Jim Long	£17,250	2025 Q-School
84	England	Thomas Lovely	£17,250	2025 Q-School
85	Netherlands	Marvin van Velzen	£17,250	2025 Q-School
86	Sweden	Viktor Tingström	£16,000	2025 Q-School
87	England	Adam Warner	£15,500	2025 Q-School
88	Scotland	Greg Ritchie	£13,500	2025 Q-School
89	England	Adam Paxton	£11,750	2025 Q-School
90	Germany	Maximilian Czerwinski	£11,250	2025 Q-School
91	Poland	Tytus Kanik	£9,250	2025 Q-School
92	Belgium	Stefaan Henderyck	£8,500	2025 Q-School
93	Austria	Rusty-Jake Rodriguez	£7,500	2025 Q-School
94	Croatia	Pero Ljubić	£5,250	2025 Q-School
95	Germany	Kai Gotthardt	£5,000	2025 Q-School
96	England	Beau Greaves	£0	2025 Development Tour
97	England	Owen Bates	£0	2025 Development Tour
98	Switzerland	Stefan Bellmont	£0	2025 Challenge Tour
99	Lithuania	Darius Labanauskas	£0	2025 Challenge Tour
100	Germany	Arno Merk	£0	2026 Q-School
101	Poland	Filip Bereza	£0	2026 Q-School
102	Wales	Rhys Griffin	£0	2026 Q-School
103	Australia	Adam Leek	£0	2026 Q-School
104	Spain	Cristo Reyes	£0	2026 Q-School
105	Netherlands	Jeffrey Sparidaans	£0	2026 Q-School
106	England	Carl Sneyd	£0	2026 Q-School
107	Ireland	Niall Culleton	£0	2026 Q-School
108	Germany	Matthias Ehlers	£0	2026 Q-School
109	Germany	Yorick Hofkens	£0	2026 Q-School
110	England	Tom Sykes	£0	2026 Q-School
111	Ireland	Shane McGuirk	£0	2026 Q-School
112	Netherlands	Jimmy van Schie	£0	2026 Q-School
113	England	Stephen Burton	£0	2026 Q-School
114	Netherlands	Chris Landman	£0	2026 Q-School
115	Slovenia	Benjamin Pratnemer	£0	2026 Q-School
116	Germany	Marvin Kraft	£0	2026 Q-School
117	Czech Republic	Adam Gawlas	£0	2026 Q-School
118	Ireland	Stephen Rosney	£0	2026 Q-School
119	England	Charlie Manby	£0	2026 Q-School
120	England	Tyler Thorpe	£0	2026 Q-School
121	Netherlands	Jeffrey de Zwaan	£0	2026 Q-School
122	England	Mervyn King	£0	2026 Q-School
123	Scotland	David Sharp	£0	2026 Q-School
124	Netherlands	Jurjen van der Velde	£0	2026 Q-School
125	Netherlands	Alexander Merkx	£0	2026 Q-School
126	Germany	Pascal Rupprecht	£0	2026 Q-School
127	England	Samuel Price	£0	2026 Q-School
128	Netherlands	Sietse Lap	£0	2026 Q-School

== Tour Cards per nation ==
No.	Nation	Number of Tour card holders	Difference to prior year
1	England	43	0
2	Netherlands	22	+1
3	Germany	15	+3
4	Scotland	7	-1
5	Belgium	5	-1
5	Ireland	6	+1
5	Wales	5	-1
8	Northern Ireland	3	-1
8	Poland	4	0
10	Sweden	3	0
11	Australia	2	+1
11	Austria	2	0
11	Czech Republic	2	+1
14	Canada	1	-1
14	Croatia	1	0
14	France	1	0
14	Latvia	1	0
14	Lithuania	1	+1
14	Norway	1	0
14	Slovenia	1	+1
14	Spain	1	+1
14	Switzerland	1	+1
–	Denmark	0	-1
–	Italy	0	-1
–	New Zealand	0	-1
–	Portugal	0	-1
–	United States	0	-2
	22 Nations	128 players	
