= 2023 Dutch Open (darts) =

Dutch Open

Tournament information
- Dates: 26–29 January 2023
- Venue: De Bonte Wever
- Location: Assen
- Country: Netherlands
- Organisation(s): WDF
- Format: Legs; Sets (only in men's semi-finals and final)
- Prize fund: €26,980 (total)
- Winner's share: €5,000 (men's) €2,500 (women's)

Champion(s)
- Berry van Peer (men's); Aileen de Graaf (women's); Sydnee de Vries (U18 boys); Ruben Baalmans (U14 boys); Sophie McKinlay (girls)

The 2023 Dutch Open (officially referred to as the 2023 TOTO Dutch Open Darts) was the 50th edition of the Dutch Open organised by the World Darts Federation and Nederlandse Darts Bond. The tournament was held at the De Bonte Wever in Assen, Netherlands.

The final day of the tournament was broadcast on RTL 7. Matches could also be followed via the DartConnect application software.

Jelle Klaasen was defending his men's title, but lost in the semi-finals to Andy Baetens. Beau Greaves was defending her women's title, but lost in the final match to Aileen de Graaf who won fourth title of this tournament.

== Prize money ==
Stage (num. of players)		Prize money			
Stage (num. of players)		Men	Women	Boys	Girls
Winner	(1)	€5,000	€2,500	€150	€125
Runner-up	(1)	€2,500	€1,250	€100	€75
Semi-finalists	(2)	€1,250	€750	€50	€40
Quarter-finalists	(4)	€500	€250	€25	—
Last 16	(8)	€200	€100	—	—
Last 32	(16)	€100	€50	—	—
Last 64	(32)	€50	—	—	—
Last 128	(64)	€25	—	—	—
Total		€26,980			

== Men's ==
=== Seeds ===
Seeding took place in accordance with the WDF Main Table ranking on 11 January 2023. The players were seeded in accordance with WDF regulations, but not always as the first match in the section. The first byes went to the seeded players, but after that the byes were equally divided across the sheets in a random place on the sheet. The list of seeds and invited players was as follows. Berry van Peer was a champion, without a seeding position.

1. Jelle Klaasen (semi-finals)
2. Neil Duff (fifth round)
3. James Hurrell (seventh round)
4. Andy Baetens (runner-up)
5. Chris Landman (ninth round)
6. Mark Barilli (ninth round)
7. Kai Fan Leung (sixth round)
8. Wesley Plaisier (quarter-finals)
9. Alexander Merkx (third round)
10. Barry Copeland (seventh round)
11. Moreno Blom (fourth round)
12. Dennie Olde Kalter (quarter-finals)
13. Mike Gillet (fourth round)
14. David Kirwan (seventh round)
15. Aaron Turner (quarter-finals)
16. Ivo Leeksma (ninth round)

=== Draw ===
Eighth round (best of 7 legs); 29 January
1	Jelle Klaasen 81.49	4
Jeroen Louissen 67.04	1
16	Ivo Leeksma 89.73	4
Aaron de Vink	0
8	Wesley Plaisier 90.11	4
Patrick van den Boogard 76.78	3
Wesley Harms 90.11	4
Nick Crouwel 83.59	3
4	Andy Baetens 94.06	4
Tonny Veenhof 88.20	1
Mareno Michels 78.09	4
Twan Uriot 71.27	1
5	Chris Landman 95.84	4
Jeffrey Bekema 87.16	1
12	Dennie Olde Kalter 83.03	4
Martin Jongejan 79.20	3
Willem Mandigers 69.95	4
Marvin van Velzen 67.31	1
15	Aaron Turner 89.73	4
Johan van Velzen 77.55	0
Arjan Konterman 94.04	4
Jeffrey Mevissen 85.27	1
Maikel Verberk 81.56	4
Bradly Roes 78.68	3
Corné Groeneveld 82.36	4
Silko Visser 76.63	0
Berry van Peer 88.04	4
Frank Hoek 77.14	1
6	Mark Barilli 90.28	4
Tom van den Hoogen 93.32	3
Joey ten Berge 71.74	4
Robin Smees 71.81	2

Ninth round (best of 7 legs); 29 January
1	Jelle Klaasen 80.49	4
16	Ivo Leeksma 80.83	3
8	Wesley Plaisier 89.73	4
Wesley Harms 78.21	2
4	Andy Baetens 87.03	4
Mareno Michels 83.21	2
5	Chris Landman 85.47	0
12	Dennie Olde Kalter 100.20	4
Willem Mandigers 81.63	1
15	Aaron Turner 88.04	4
Arjan Konterman 87.14	4
Maikel Verberk 86.50	3
Corné Groeneveld 78.25	1
Berry van Peer 85.29	4
6	Mark Barilli 90.07	2
Joey ten Berge 87.19	4

Quarter-finals (best of 9 legs); 29 January
1	Jelle Klaasen 81.65	5
8	Wesley Plaisier 81.34	2
4	Andy Baetens 90.24	5
12	Dennie Olde Kalter 85.28	3
15	Aaron Turner 67.31	2
Arjan Konterman 76.96	5
Berry van Peer 87.00	5
Joey ten Berge 77.69	2

Semi-finals (best of 3 sets); 29 January
1	Jelle Klaasen 86.20	1
4	Andy Baetens 92.37	2
Arjan Konterman 82.26	0
Berry van Peer 85.88	2

Final (best of 5 sets); 29 January
4	Andy Baetens 86.62	1
Berry van Peer 88.29	3

== Women's ==
=== Seeds ===
Seeding took place in accordance with the WDF Main Table ranking on 11 January 2023. The players were seeded in accordance with WDF regulations, but not always as the first match in the section. The first byes go to the seeded players, but after that the byes were equally divided across the sheets in a random place on the sheet. The list of seeds and invited players was as follows:

1. Beau Greaves (runner-up)
2. Deta Hedman (sixth round)
3. Aileen de Graaf (champion)
4. Rhian O'Sullivan (semi-finals)
5. Anca Zijlstra (sixth round)
6. Kirsty Hutchinson (second round)
7. Suzanne Smith (sixth round)
8. Aletta Wajer (quarter-finals)
9. Jo Clements (third round)
10. Lorraine Hyde (quarter-finals)
11. Priscilla Steenbergen (second round)
12. Natalie Gilbert (third round)
13. Tori Kewish (second round)
14. Margaret Sutton (fourth round)
15. Noa-Lynn van Leuven (semi-finals)
16. Adriana van Wijgerden (sixth round)

=== Draw ===
Fifth round (best of 7 legs); 28 January
1	Beau Greaves 73.32	4
Joyce Schuurman 55.37	0
16	Adriana van Wijgerden 57.98	4
Lerena Rietbergen 56.63	3
8	Aletta Wajer 63.47	4
Floortje van Zanten 66.44	1
Marjolein Noijens 48.01	4
Liz McManus 47.29	3
4	Rhian O'Sullivan 69.91	4
Louise Hepburn 55.04	0
Vanessa Zuidema 56.04	4
Megan Lucas 48.90	1
5	Anca Zijlstra 64.65	4
Sophie McKinlay 64.67	1
Astrid Trouwborst 55.30
Emma Little 53.02
2	Deta Hedman 58.47	4
Saskia van Zoeren 58.22	3
15	Noa-Lynn van Leuven 71.51	4
Evelien van Tol 55.37	1
7	Suzanne Smith 57.26	4
Eireann van Wijgerden 52.21
10	Lorraine Hyde 67.77
Sharon Straatsma-Pul 65.66
3	Aileen de Graaf 72.43
Shannon Mos 57.33
Sharona Veld 61.98	4
Fabienne Romelingh 54.39	0
Kyana Frauenfelder 57.83	4
Iselin Hauen 60.72	1
Shana van Nieuwenhoven 63.96	4
Kelly Streef 55.61	0

Sixth round (best of 7 legs); 28 January
1	Beau Greaves 82.36	4
16	Adriana van Wijgerden 70.00	0
8	Aletta Wajer 65.35	4
Marjolein Noijens 59.00	0
4	Rhian O'Sullivan 80.16	4
Vanessa Zuidema 61.33	0
5	Anca Zijlstra 62.20	2
Astrid Trouwborst 61.88	4
2	Deta Hedman 64.72	3
15	Noa-Lynn van Leuven 69.14	4
7	Suzanne Smith 56.33	0
10	Lorraine Hyde 70.73	4
3	Aileen de Graaf 93.94	4
Sharona Veld 61.25	0
Kyana Frauenfelder 54.91	2
Shana van Nieuwenhoven 55.07	4

Quarter-finals (best of 7 legs); 28 January
1	Beau Greaves 98.56	4
8	Aletta Wajer 71.15	0
4	Rhian O'Sullivan 71.81	4
Astrid Trouwborst 68.52	2
15	Noa-Lynn van Leuven 72.66	4
10	Lorraine Hyde 69.88	3
3	Aileen de Graaf 73.87	4
Shana van Nieuwenhoven 54.09	1

Semi-finals (best of 7 legs); 28 January
1	Beau Greaves 93.69	4
4	Rhian O'Sullivan 97.14	3
15	Noa-Lynn van Leuven 80.04	0
3	Aileen de Graaf 79.11	4

Final (best of 9 legs); 29 January
1	Beau Greaves 82.74	2
3	Aileen de Graaf 81.68	5

== Boys (U18) ==
=== Seeds ===
Seeding took place in accordance of the WDF Rankings for 11 January 2023. The players were seeded in accordance with WDF regulations, but not always as the first match in the section. The first byes go to the seeded players, but after that the byes are equally divided across the sheets in a random place on the sheet.

1. Dylan van Lierop (quarter-finals)
2. Tinus van Tiel (fourth round)
3. Enrico Frank (second round)
4. Mats Theobald (runner-up)
5. Sydnee de Vries (champion)
6. Bradley van der Velden (fourth round)
7. Pim van Bijnen (semi-finals)
8. Seppe Dasseville (fourth round)

=== Draw (last 8 onwards) ===
Quarter-finals (best of 5 legs); 29 January
7	Pim van Bijnen 85.74	3
1	Dylan van Lierop 73.03	1
4	Mats Theobald 62.63	3
Yorick Hofkens 56.30	0
Caspar Gruß 71.35	3
Matteo Gesquière 67.19	1
5	Sydnee de Vries 67.77	3
Daan Beernink 69.44	1

Semi-finals (best of 5 legs); 29 January
7	Pim van Bijnen 73.42	1
4	Mats Theobald 84.17	3
Caspar Gruß 71.35	2
5	Sydnee de Vries 67.95	3

Final (best of 7 legs); 29 January
4	Mats Theobald 65.27	3
5	Sydnee de Vries 63.96	4
