= British Classic (darts) =

Tournament information
- Location: Various
- Country: England
- Established: 1997
- Organisation(s): WDF Silver category
- Format: Legs
- Prize fund: £15,760
- Month(s) Played: September

Current champion(s)
- Oliver Mitchell (men's); Aletta Wajer (women's)

The British Classic is a darts tournament that has been held annually since 1997.

== List of winners ==
=== Men's ===
Year	Champion (average in final)	Score	Runner-up (average in final)	Total Prize Money	Champion	Runner-up
1997	(England) Dennis Priestley	?–?	(England) Andy Smith	?	?	?
1998	Mervyn King	?–?	(England) Chris Mason	?	?	?
1999	(England) Mervyn King	?–?	(England) Robbie Widdows	?	?	?
2000	(Wales) Ritchie Davies	?–?	(England) Wayne Jones	?	?	?
2001	(England) John Walton	?–?	(England) James Wade	?	?	?
2002	(England) Mervyn King	?–?	(England) Tony Martin	?	?	?
2003	(England) Mark Forman	?–?	(England) John Walton	?	?	?
2004	(England) Darryl Fitton	2–1	(England) Tony Eccles	£3,400	£2,000	£500
2005	(England) Paul Hogan (85.80)	2–1	(Scotland) Gary Anderson (86.25)	£3,440	£2,000	£500
2006	(Scotland) Gary Anderson	2–1	(England) Mervyn King	?	?	?
2007	(Netherlands) Co Stompé	2–0	(England) Steve Farmer	£2,000	?	?
2008	(Scotland) Ross Montgomery	4–0	(Scotland) Gary Anderson	£3,440	£2,000	£500
2009	(England) Stephen Bunting	2–1	(England) Scott Waites	£3,440	£2,000	£500
2010	(Scotland) Ross Montgomery	2–0	(England) Stuart Kellet	£4,440	£3,000	£500
2011	(England) Dean Winstanley	2–0	(England) Garry Thompson	£5,320	£3,000	£1,000
2012	(Netherlands) Jan Dekker	6–1	(England) Stephen Bunting	£7,200	£3,000	£1,200
2013	(England) Tony Eccles	6–3	(Netherlands) Remco van Eijden	£7,200	£3,000	£1,200
2014	(England) Alan Norris	6–5	(England) Pip Blackwell	£7,200	£3,000	£1,200
2015	(England) Scott Waites	6–5	(England) Glen Durrant	£7,600	£3,000	£1,200
2016	(England) Glen Durrant (94.62)	6–3	(England) Mark McGeeney (88.59)	£7,600	£3,000	£1,200
2017	(England) Jamie Hughes	6–5	(Wales) Jim Williams	£7,600	£3,000	£1,200
2018	(Netherlands) Richard Veenstra (101.07)	6–5	(Netherlands) Wesley Harms (93.78)	£12,400	£3,000	£1,500
2019	(Netherlands) Dennie Olde Kalter (84.70)	6–4	(England) Dave Parletti (81.47)	£12,400	£3,000	£1,500
2021	Jim McEwan (85.93)	6–5	Rhys Hayden (86.68)	£12,400	£3,000	£1,500
2022	James Richardson (91.05)	6–4	Gary Stone (96.17)	£12,400	£3,000	£1,500
2023	Luke Littler (105.85)	5–0	Carl Wilkinson (85.04)	£4,940	£1,500	£700
2024	Connor Scutt (91.73)	5–2	Josh Clough (87.86)	£5,040	£1,500	£700
2025	Oliver Mitchell 99.18	5–3	Mitchell Lawrie 100.43	£5,040	£1,500	£700

=== Women's ===
Year	Champion	Av.	Score	Runner-Up	Av.	Prize Money			Venue
Year	Champion	Av.	Score	Runner-Up	Av.	Total	Ch.	R.-Up	Venue
1997	(Scotland) Anne Kirk	n/a	beat	(England) Tricia Wright	n/a	n/a	n/a	n/a	Blackpool
1998	(Wales) Sandra Greatbatch	n/a	beat	(England) Apylee Jones	n/a	n/a	n/a	n/a	Kettering, Northants
1999	(Scotland) Anne Kirk (2)	n/a	beat	(Wales) Sandra Greatbatch	n/a	n/a	n/a	n/a	Kettering, Northants
2000	(England) Trina Gulliver	n/a	beat	(Wales) Sandra Greatbatch	n/a	n/a	n/a	n/a	Kettering, Northants
2001	(England) Trina Gulliver (2)	n/a	beat	(Sweden) Vicky Pruim	n/a	n/a	n/a	n/a	Kettering, Northants
2002	(England) Tricia Wright	n/a	beat	(England) Trina Gulliver	n/a	n/a	n/a	n/a	Kettering, Northants
2003	(England) Trina Gulliver (3)	n/a	beat	(Belgium) Sandra Pollet	n/a	n/a	n/a	n/a	Kettering, Northants
2004	(England) Dee Bateman	n/a	beat	(England) Trina Gulliver	n/a	n/a	n/a	n/a	Kettering, Northants
2005	(England) Trina Gulliver (4)	n/a	beat	(England) Linda Searle	n/a	n/a	n/a	n/a	Kettering, Northants
2006	(England) Dee Bateman (2)	n/a	beat	(England) Clare Bywaters	n/a	n/a	n/a	n/a	Kettering, Northants
2007	(England) Clare Bywaters	n/a	beat	(Netherlands) Karin Krappen	n/a	n/a	n/a	n/a	Kettering, Northants
2008	(England) Trina Gulliver (5)	n/a	beat	(Netherlands) Francis Hoenselaar	n/a	n/a	n/a	n/a	Kettering, Northants
2009	(Wales) Julie Gore	n/a	3 – 2	(England) Karen Lawman	n/a	n/a	n/a	n/a	Kettering, Northants
2010	(England) Deta Hedman	n/a	3 – 2	(England) Karen Lawman	n/a	n/a	n/a	n/a	Towerlands Park, Braintree, Essex
2011	(England) Trina Gulliver (6)	n/a	3 – 1	(England) Lorraine Winstanley	n/a	n/a	n/a	n/a	Ricoh Arena, Coventry
2012	(England) Deta Hedman (2)	n/a	4 – 2	(Russia) Anastasia Dobromyslova	n/a	n/a	n/a	n/a	Ricoh Arena, Coventry
2013	(England) Fallon Sherrock	n/a	5 – 1	(Russia) Anastasia Dobromyslova	n/a	n/a	n/a	n/a	Magna Centre, Rotherham
2014	(England) Deta Hedman (3)	n/a	5 – 1	(England) Lorraine Winstanley	n/a	n/a	n/a	n/a	Hull Arena, Hull
2015	(England) Fallon Sherrock (2)	n/a	5 – 3	(Russia) Anastasia Dobromyslova	n/a	n/a	n/a	n/a	Bridlington Spa, Bridlington
2016	(England) Claire Brookin	72.33	5 – 2	(Wales) Rhian Griffiths	74.64	n/a	n/a	n/a	Bridlington Spa, Bridlington
2017	(Netherlands) Aileen de Graaf	n/a	5 – 4	(Australia) Corrine Hammond	n/a	n/a	n/a	n/a	Bridlington Spa, Bridlington
2018	(England) Laura Turner	n/a	5 – 1	(England) Lisa Ashton	n/a	£2,360	£1,000	£400	Bridlington Spa, Bridlington
2019	(England) Lisa Ashton	n/a	5 – 2	(England) Fallon Sherrock	n/a	£2,360	£1,000	£400	Bridlington Spa, Bridlington
2021	(Scotland) Lorraine Hyde	61.37	5 – 1	(Northern Ireland) Denise Cassidy	60.55	£2,360	£1,000	£400	Bridlington Spa, Bridlington
2022	(England) Beau Greaves	84.06	5 – 1	(England) Lisa Ashton	76.09	£2,360	£1,000	£400	Bridlington Spa, Bridlington
2023	(England) Deta Hedman (4)	69.60	5 – 2	(Netherlands) Aletta Wajer	67.29	£2,170	£750	£350	Bridlington Spa, Bridlington
2024	Beau Greaves (2)	83.54	5 – 2	Vicky Pruim	67.68	£2,170	£750	£350	Bridlington Spa, Bridlington
2025	Aletta Wajer	66.46	5 – 1	Ruby Grey	59.52	£2,170	£750	£350	Bridlington Spa, Bridlington

=== Youth ===
Year	Champion	Av.	Score	Runner-Up	Av.	Prize Money			Venue
Year	Champion	Av.	Score	Runner-Up	Av.	Total	Ch.	R.-Up	Venue
2019	(England) Nathan Care	n/a	4 – 2	(England) Keelan Kay	n/a	£1,000	£800	£400	Bridlington Spa, Bridlington
2021	(England) Luke Littler	77.55	4 – 3	(England) Tavis Dudeney	82.17	£1,000	£800	£400	Bridlington Spa, Bridlington
2022	(England) Thomas Banks	79.51	5 – 2	Archie Self	70.57	£1,000	£800	£400	Bridlington Spa, Bridlington
2023	(England) Jenson Walker	82.63	5 – 4	Aifie Busby	78.63	£1,000	£800	£400	

=== Girls ===
Year	Champion	Av.	Score	Runner-up	Av.	Venue
2021	(England) Eleanor Cairns	62.13	3 – 1	(England) Amy Evans	61.40	Bridlington Spa, Bridlington
2022	(England) Lyla Leightley	44.05	3 – 2	(England) Eleanor Cairns	45.18	Bridlington Spa, Bridlington
2023	(Scotland) Sophie McKinlay	69.37	3 – 0	(England) Hannah Meek	58.32	

== Tournament records ==
- Most wins 3: (England) Mervyn King.
- Most Finals 4: (England) Mervyn King.
- Most Semi Finals 5: (Scotland) Gary Anderson.
- Most Quarter Finals 6: (Scotland) Gary Anderson.
- Most Appearances 12: (England) John Walton.
- Most Prize Money won £5,175: (Scotland) Ross Montgomery.
- Best winning average (105.85) : (England) Luke Littler.
- Youngest Winner age 16: (England) Luke Littler.
- Oldest Winner age 47: (Scotland) Ross Montgomery.
