= Lorraine Hyde =

Scottish darts player (born 1989)

Personal information
- Nickname: "Hydie"
- Born: 11 December 1989 (age 36) Inverurie, Aberdeenshire, Scotland
- Home town: Aberdeen, Scotland

Sport
- Sport: Darts
- Playing since: 2004
- Darts: 28g SuperDarts Signature
- Laterality: Right-handed
- Walk-on music: "Have You Ever Seen The Rain" by Navé Gray

Organisation (see split in darts)
- BDO: 2006–2020
- PDC: 2020–
- WDF: 2006–
- Current world ranking: (WDF W) 11 (17 August 2026)

WDF major events – best performances
- World Championship: Quarter-final: 2025
- World Masters: Winner (1): 2025
- Dutch Open: Semi-final: 2025

Other tournament wins
- Years
British Classic	2021
Denmark Open	2025
Irish Open	2024
Italian Open	2022
Scottish Championship	2009
Scottish Classic	2025
Scottish Open	2025
Medal record
Women's Darts
Representing Scotland
WDF World Cup
Bronze medal – third place	2025 Seoul	Women's pairs
Bronze medal – third place	2025 Seoul	Women's team
Bronze medal – third place	2007 Rosmalen	Girls singles
WDF Europe Cup
Bronze medal – third place	2018 Budapest	Women's team

Lorraine Hyde (born 11 December 1989) is a Scottish professional darts player who competes in World Darts Federation (WDF) and Professional Darts Corporation (PDC) events. She won the 2025 WDF World Masters title. She has won multiple ranking WDF titles, including the 2021 British Classic, the 2022 Italian Open, the 2024 Irish Open, and both the Scottish Classic and Scottish Open in 2025.

She reached the semi-finals of the Dutch Open in 2025.

Her best Women's World Championship performance is reaching the last 16 at the 2023 WDF World Championship.

== Career ==
=== Youth career ===
Hyde started playing darts in 2004, at the age of 15. Three years later, she reached the finals of the 2007 Winmau World Girls Masters. She lost to defending champion Kimberley Lewis 4–2 in legs.

In October 2007, she was selected by the Scottish national federation to participate in the 2007 WDF World Cup's youth competitions. In the singles competition, she advanced to the semi-finals, where she lost to eventual winner Linda Odén 3–1 in legs.

=== BDO ===
She made her debut at the senior World Masters in 2008, but lost in the first round to Amanda Harwood 4–1 in legs.

=== WDF ===
During the 2018 WDF Europe Cup, she was part of the Scotland team that won the bronze medal in the team competition.

In 2021, she won the British Classic, defeating Denise Cassidy in the final. with victory at the British Classic. On the way to the final, she defeated Jo Rolls, Anca Zijlstra, Kirsty Hutchinson and Anastasia Dobromyslova. In the final, she beat Denise Cassidy 5–1 in legs.

Also in 2021, she reached the quarter-finals of both the Irish Open and Irish Classic. She reached the semi-finals at the Isle of Man Open, losing the match to Deta Hedman 4–2 in legs.

As a result of her seasonal performances, she qualified for the 2022 WDF World Darts Championship. However, in her debut match, she lost to Tori Kewish 2–0 in sets. She played at the 2022 Dutch Open and advanced to the fifth round, but lost to Lorraine Winstanley 4–3 in legs. At the end of September 2022, she was selected by the national federation to participate in the 2022 WDF Europe Cup. On the second day of the tournament, she advanced to the fourth round of the singles competition, where she lost to Claire Brookin 4–0 in legs. In the teams tournament, she was eliminated in the quarter-finals.

=== PDC ===
Since 2020, she has competed in Professional Darts Corporation (PDC) Women's Series tournaments. In 2021, she reached the semi-finals of a PDC Women’s Series event and finished the season ranked within the top 20.

== World Championship results ==
=== WDF ===
- 2022: First round (lost to Tori Kewish 0–2)
- 2023: Second round (lost to Beau Greaves 0–2)
- 2024: First round (lost to Mayumi Ouchi 1–2)
- 2025: Quarter-finals (lost to Priscilla Steenbergen 1–3)

== Career finals ==
=== WDF major finals: 1 (1 titles) ===
Legend
World Masters (1–0)

Outcome	No.	Year	Championship	Opponent in the final	Score (Note: (l) = score in legs, (s) = score in sets.)
Winner	1.	2025	World Masters (1)	(Norway) Rachna David	6–5 (l)

== Performance timeline ==
BDO

Tournament	2008	2009	2010	2011	2012	2013	2014	2015	2016
World Masters	1R	1R	1R	1R	DNQ				1R

WDF

Tournament	2022	2023	2024	2025	2026
WDF Major/platinum events
WDF World Championship	1R	2R	1R	QF	
WDF World Masters	QF	NH	QF	W	
Dutch Open	5R	QF	QF	SF	3R
