= 2024 Dutch Open (darts) =

Dutch Open

Tournament information
- Dates: 1–4 February 2024
- Venue: De Bonte Wever
- Location: Assen
- Country: Netherlands
- Organisation(s): WDF
- Format: Legs; Sets (only in men's semi-finals and final)
- Prize fund: €26,980 (total)
- Winner's share: €5,000 (men's) €2,500 (women's)

Champion(s)
- Jarno Bottenberg (men's); Beau Greaves (women's); Ruben Baalmans (U18 boys); Balázs Szoták (U14 boys); Paige Pauling (girls)

The 2024 Dutch Open (officially referred to as the 2024 TOTO Dutch Open Darts) was the 51st edition of the Dutch Open organised by the World Darts Federation and Nederlandse Darts Bond. The tournament was held at the De Bonte Wever in Assen, Netherlands.

The final day of the tournament was broadcast on RTL 7. Matches could also be followed via the DartConnect application software.

Berry van Peer was defending his men's title, but could not defend his title after winning a PDC Tourcard. Aileen de Graaf was defending her women's title, but lost in the final match to Beau Greaves who won her second title of this tournament.

== Prize money ==
Stage (num. of players)		Prize money			
Stage (num. of players)		Men	Women	Boys	Girls
Winner	(1)	€5,000	€2,500	€150	€125
Runner-up	(1)	€2,500	€1,250	€100	€75
Semi-finalists	(2)	€1,250	€750	€50	€40
Quarter-finalists	(4)	€500	€250	€25	—
Last 16	(8)	€200	€100	—	—
Last 32	(16)	€100	€50	—	—
Last 64	(32)	€50	—	—	—
Last 128	(64)	€25	—	—	—
Total		€26,980			

== Men's ==
=== Seeds ===
Seeding took place in accordance of the WDF Main Table. The players were seeded in accordance with WDF regulations, but not always as the first match in the section. The first byes went to the seeded players, but after that the byes were equally divided across the sheets in a random place on the sheet. The list of seeds and invited players was as follows.

1. Wesley Plaisier (runner-up)
2. Mark Barilli (withdrawn)
3. Alexander Merkx (fourth round)
4. Moreno Blom (fifth round)
5. (Germany) Liam Maendl-Lawrance (fourth round)
6. Thomas Junghans (ninth round)
7. Dennie Olde Kalter (sixth round)
8. Mark Graham (fourth round)
9. Ivo Leeksma (fifth round)
10. Arjan Konterman (quarter-finals)
11. Johan van Velzen (seventh round)
12. Bradly Roes (fifth round)
13. Philip van Gasse (eighth round)
14. Sybren Gijbels (quarter-finals)
15. Tonny Veenhof (fifth round)
16. Ryan de Vreede (withdrawn)

=== Draw ===
Eighth round (best of 7 legs); 29 January
1	Wesley Plaisier 82.75	4
Vincent van der Meer 70.88	1
Frans Harmsen 78.09	4
Ricardo Ulrich	3
Bram van Dijk 73.98	4
Nicky van Aalst 65.69	2
Meinte Hibma 76.10	4
Alwyn van Saarloos 63.16	0
Christian Kist 90.43	4
Bradley van der Velden 77.79	2
Ziggy Schenk 71.01	4
14	Philip van Gasse 71.91	3
Jerry Hendriks 75.52	4
Dion de Jong 65.26	3
Sascha Stuhlemmer 80.19	4
Carlo van Peer 71.48	1
Jarno Bottenberg 80.16	4
Gerwin Spanjers 68.04	0
Patrick Schop 79.18	4
Nigel van Milligen 74.92	2
Mike van Duivenbode 81.24	4
Davy Proosten 78.54	0
10	Arjan Konterman 85.43	4
Barry Zander 78.07	1
Bert de Lange 82.43	4
Silko Visser 79.39	2
14	Sybren Gijbels 81.24	4
Kristiaan de Boer 76.83	0
6	Thomas Junghans 90.94	4
Mareno Michels 79.10	1
Jeremy Derksen 77.08	4
Davyd Venken 76.04	0

Ninth round (best of 7 legs); 29 January
1	Wesley Plaisier 93.24	4
Frans Harmsen 86.65	2
Bram van Dijk 73.93	4
Meinte Hibma 69.97	1
Christian Kist 93.08	4
Ziggy Schenk 73.31	1
Jerry Hendriks 78.93	1
Sascha Stuhlemmer 95.58	4
Jarno Bottenberg 86.46	4
Patrick Schop 80.40	2
Mike van Duivenbode 83.06	3
10	Arjan Konterman 91.23	4
Bert de Lange 79.60	3
14	Sybren Gijbels 84.46	4
6	Thomas Junghans 71.12	2
Jeremy Derksen 72.30	4

Quarter-finals (best of 9 legs); 29 January
1	Wesley Plaisier 83.72	5
Bram van Dijk 76.67	2
Christian Kist 87.14	4
Sascha Stuhlemmer 86.90	5
Jarno Bottenberg 92.92	5
10	Arjan Konterman 84.16	2
14	Sybren Gijbels 72.48	1
Jeremy Derksen 78.00	5

Semi-finals (best of 3 sets); 29 January
1	Wesley Plaisier 94.98	2
Sascha Stuhlemmer 88.14	0
Jarno Bottenberg 84.56	2
Jeremy Derksen 71.17	0

Final (best of 5 sets); 29 January
1	Wesley Plaisier 84.78	2
Jarno Bottenberg 84.44	3

== Women's ==
=== Seeds ===
Seeding took place in accordance of the WDF Main Table. The players were seeded in accordance with WDF regulations, but not always as the first match in the section. The first byes go to the seeded players, but after that the byes were equally divided across the sheets in a random place on the sheet. The list of seeds and invited players was as follows.

1. Beau Greaves (champion)
2. Aileen de Graaf (runner-up)
3. Rhian O'Sullivan (quarter-finals)
4. Noa-Lynn van Leuven (semi-finals)
5. Kirsty Hutchinson (quarter-finals)
6. Lorraine Winstanley (fifth round)
7. Anca Zijlstra (quarter-finals)
8. Irina Armstrong (fourth round)
9. Lorraine Hyde (quarter-finals)
10. Priscilla Steenbergen (second round)
11. Natalie Gilbert (semi-finals)
12. Sophie McKinlay (sixth round)
13. Tori Kewish (sixth round)
14. Monique Leßmeister (withdrawn)
15. Adriana van Wijgerden (sixth round)
16. Lerena Rietbergen (sixth round)

=== Draw ===
Fifth round (best of 7 legs); 28 January
1	Beau Greaves 92.49	4
Desiree Geel 75.29	0
16	Lerena Rietbergen 71.17	4
Anna Votavova 74.62	3
Sharon Straatsma 57.35	4
Karin Harmsen 61.50	2
9	Lorraine Hyde 77.08	4
Romy van der Galiën 59.00	0
4	Noa-Lynn van Leuven 71.66	4
Kelly Streef 69.73	1
13	Tori Kewish 56.24	4
Astrid Trouwborst 55.74	2
5	Kirsty Hutchinson 57.26	4
Iselin Hauen 53.06	0
12	Sophie McKinlay 56.10	4
Christine Hyde 53.29	3
2	Aileen de Graaf 77.24	4
Nathalie van Marm 64.03	3
15	Adriana van Wijgerden 60.61	4
Shana van Nieuwenhoven 55.20	1
7	Anca Zijlstra 60.51	4
Ilona van Emden 50.88	1
Paige Pauling 82.36	4
Chantal Niebeek 58.83	0
3	Rhian O'Sullivan 69.10	4
Kyana Frauenfelder 55.71	0
Mahi Bosmia 61.99	4
Sharona Veld 58.85	2
6	Lorraine Winstanley 66.55	1
Chris Savvery 65.51	4
11	Natalie Gilbert 64.78	4
Jaynie Wink 52.31	2

Sixth round (best of 7 legs); 28 January
1	Beau Greaves 98.56	4
16	Lerena Rietbergen 79.84	0
Sharon Straatsma 64.14	1
9	Lorraine Hyde 72.38	4
4	Noa-Lynn van Leuven 85.12	4
13	Tori Kewish 59.75	1
5	Kirsty Hutchinson 71.11	4
12	Sophie McKinlay 58.65	1
2	Aileen de Graaf 69.91	4
15	Adriana van Wijgerden 57.92	1
7	Anca Zijlstra 69.43	4
Paige Pauling 70.31	3
3	Rhian O'Sullivan 72.50	4
Mahi Bosmia 62.44	1
Chris Savvery 65.94	1
11	Natalie Gilbert 73.89	4

Quarter-finals (best of 7 legs); 28 January
1	Beau Greaves 82.42	4
9	Lorraine Hyde 70.52	1
4	Noa-Lynn van Leuven 91.35	4
5	Kirsty Hutchinson 68.81	1
2	Aileen de Graaf 73.93	4
7	Anca Zijlstra 63.38	1
3	Rhian O'Sullivan 63.04	3
11	Natalie Gilbert 67.48	4

Semi-finals (best of 7 legs); 28 January
1	Beau Greaves 84.90	4
4	Noa-Lynn van Leuven 86.11	1
2	Aileen de Graaf 71.16	4
11	Natalie Gilbert 64.00	2

Final (best of 9 legs); 29 January
1	Beau Greaves 83.04	5
2	Aileen de Graaf 76.40	1

== Boys (U18) ==
=== Draw (last 8 onwards) ===
Quarter-finals (best of 5 legs); 29 January
Leopold Averbeck 66.31	3
Vince van Eynde 52.67	0
Cor Beukema 62.63	3
Ruben Aukes 52.88	0
Jake Jesurun 64.08	3
David van Wilgen 65.19	2
Ruben Baalmans 71.63	3
Raf Vermeulen 65.56	1

Semi-finals (best of 5 legs); 29 January
Leopold Averbeck 54.73	0
Cor Beukema 57.08	3
Jake Jesurun 55.71	0
Ruben Baalmans 63.51	3

Final (best of 7 legs); 29 January
Cor Beukema	2
Ruben Baalmans 72.81	4
