= Dennie Olde Kalter =

Dutch darts player (born 1991)

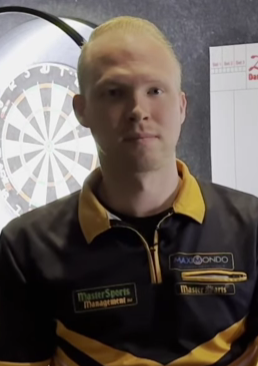
- Olde Kalter in 2023

Personal information
- Born: 22 October 1991 (age 35)
- Home town: Hengelo, Netherlands

Sport
- Sport: Darts
- Playing since: 2011
- Darts: 22g MasterDarts
- Laterality: Right-handed

Organisation (see split in darts)
- BDO: 2017–2020
- PDC: 2020–present (Tour Card: 2025–present)
- WDF: 2017–2024
- Current world ranking: (PDC) 108 (29 October 2026)

WDF major events – best performances
- World Championship: Last 16: 2020, 2023
- World Masters: Last 48: 2017
- Finder Masters: Last 24 Group: 2017
- Dutch Open: Quarter-final: 2023

PDC premier events – best performances
- UK Open: Last 128: 2026
Medal record
Men's Darts
Representing Netherlands
WDF Europe Cup
Gold medal – first place	2024 Šamorín	Men's singles
Silver medal – second place	2022 Gandía	Men's team
Silver medal – second place	2022 Gandía	Men's overall
Silver medal – second place	2024 Šamorín	Men's overall
Bronze medal – third place	2024 Šamorín	Men's team

Dennie Olde Kalter (born 22 October 1991) is a Dutch professional darts player who competes in Professional Darts Corporation (PDC) events. A PDC Tour Card holder since 2025 Q-School, he reached his first PDC ranking final at Players Championship 32 on the 2025 PDC Pro Tour.

He previously competed in World Darts Federation (WDF) events, winning a gold medal in the 2024 WDF Europe Cup Singles, and winning both the 2019 British Classic and 2022 Swedish Masters. He also reached the quarter-finals at the 2023 Dutch Open.

== Career ==
In September 2019, Olde Kalter qualified for the 2020 BDO World Championship, where he beat Nick Kenny in the first round before losing to Mario Vandenbogaerde in the last 16.

In January 2025, Olde Kalter secured a two-year PDC Tour Card with victory on day three of European Q-School. After losing his opening 20 matches on the 2025 Pro Tour, he surprisingly reached his first PDC ranking final at Players Championship 32 whilst ranked 140 in the world; he lost 8–2 to Luke Littler.

== World Championship results ==
=== BDO ===
- 2020: Second round (lost to Mario Vandenbogaerde 1–4)

=== WDF ===
- 2023: Third round (lost to Jelle Klaasen 2–3)

== Performance timeline ==
=== BDO ===
Tournament	2017	2019	2020
BDO Ranked televised events
World Championship	DNQ		2R
World Masters	4R	3R	NH

=== WDF ===
Tournament	2017	2018	2019	2020	2022	2023	2024
WDF major/platinum events
World Championship	Not held				DNQ	3R	DNQ
World Masters	Not held				3R	NH	2R
Dutch Open	4R	2R	5R	7R	7R	QF	5R

=== PDC ===
Tournament	2025	2026
PDC Ranked televised events
World Masters	Prel.	Prel.
UK Open	1R	2R
Career statistics
Season-end ranking (PDC)	135	

=== PDC Players Championships ===
Season	1	2	3	4	5	6	7	8	9	10	11	12	13	14	15	16	17	18	19	20	21	22	23	24	25	26	27	28	29	30	31	32	33	34
2025	WIG; 1R	WIG; 1R	ROS; 1R	ROS; 1R	LEI; 1R	LEI; 1R	HIL; 1R	HIL; 1R	LEI; 1R	LEI; 1R	LEI; DNP		ROS; 1R	ROS; 1R	HIL; 1R	HIL; 1R	LEI; 1R	LEI; 1R	LEI; 1R	LEI; 1R	LEI; 1R	HIL; 1R	HIL; 4R	MIL; 1R	MIL; 3R	HIL; 2R	HIL; 1R	LEI; 1R	LEI; 1R	LEI; 3R	WIG; 1R	WIG; F	WIG; 2R	WIG; 2R
2026	HIL; 1R	HIL; 1R	WIG; 1R	WIG; 1R	LEI; 1R	LEI; 1R	LEI; 1R	LEI; 1R	WIG; 1R	WIG; 2R	MIL; 3R	MIL; 1R	HIL; 1R	HIL; 1R	LEI; 1R	LEI; 2R	LEI; 1R	LEI; 1R	MIL; 1R	MIL; 1R	WIG; 1R	WIG; 3R	LEI; 2R	LEI; 1R	HIL; 1R	HIL; 1R	LEI; 1R	LEI; 1R	ROS; 1R	ROS; 1R	ROS; 2R	ROS; 1R	LEI; DNP	
