= Adam Lipscombe =

English darts player (born 1992)

Personal information
- Nickname: "Baby Boy"
- Born: 30 May 1992 (age 34) Portsmouth, England

Sport
- Sport: Darts
- Playing since: 2012
- Darts: 25g Target
- Laterality: Right-handed

Organisation (see split in darts)
- PDC: 2013, 2023–present (Tour Card: 2025–present)
- Current world ranking: (PDC) 74 ▼1 (29 October 2026)

PDC premier events – best performances
- World Championship: Last 128: 2026
- UK Open: Last 64: 2025, 2026
- PC Finals: Last 16: 2025

Adam Lipscombe (born 30 May 1992) is an English professional darts player who competes in Professional Darts Corporation (PDC) events. He obtained a PDC Tour Card at 2025 Q-School and reached his first PDC ranking final at Players Championship 7 the same year. He reached the last 16 of the 2025 Players Championship Finals. Prior to gaining his Tour Card, he was a finalist in the Amateur Darts Circuit (ADC)'s Global Championship in 2024.

== Career ==
Lipscombe's first matches on the PDC circuit came on the PDC Challenge Tour, the organisation's secondary tour, with results dating back to 2013. He started competing in the MODUS Super Series, a weekly 12-player darts tournament based in Portsmouth, in 2023, most notably being on the receiving end of a nine-dart finish from Fallon Sherrock. In December 2024, Lipscombe was the runner-up at the ADC Global Championship. He was defeated by Devon Petersen 9–3 in the final.

Lipscombe attended 2025 PDC Q-School in hopes of obtaining a PDC Tour Card. After initially being eliminated in the first stage of the event, he was invited back for the final stage following the withdrawal of David Pallett. A run to the semi-finals on the final day of play ensured a high position on the final ranking table, resulting in him winning a Tour Card for the first time.

In March 2025, he reached his first PDC ranking final, losing to 8–3 to Gary Anderson at Players Championship 7. In November, Lipscombe reached the last 16 of the 2025 Players Championship Finals but missed 10 match darts in a deciding leg loss to Daryl Gurney.

== Personal life ==
Lipscombe was born on 30 May 1992 in Portsmouth, England. Outside of darts, he is also a groundworker.

== World Championship results ==
=== PDC ===
- 2026: First round (lost to Jonny Clayton 1–3)

== Performance timeline ==
Adam Lipscombe's performance timeline is as follows:

Tournament	2025	2026
PDC Ranked televised events
World Championship	DNQ	1R
World Masters	Prel.	Prel.
UK Open	4R	4R
Players Championship Finals	3R	
Career statistics
Season-end ranking (PDC)	85	

=== PDC European Tour ===
Tournament	2026
German Darts Grand Prix	1R

=== PDC Players Championships ===
Season	1	2	3	4	5	6	7	8	9	10	11	12	13	14	15	16	17	18	19	20	21	22	23	24	25	26	27	28	29	30	31	32	33	34
2025	WIG; 2R	WIG; 1R	ROS; 1R	ROS; 1R	LEI; 3R	LEI; 2R	HIL; F	HIL; 1R	LEI; 3R	LEI; 1R	LEI; QF	LEI; 2R	ROS; 1R	ROS; 1R	HIL; 2R	HIL; 1R	LEI; 1R	LEI; 2R	LEI; 1R	LEI; 2R	LEI; 1R	HIL; 2R	HIL; 2R	MIL; 1R	MIL; 1R	HIL; 1R	HIL; 1R	LEI; 1R	LEI; 1R	LEI; 3R	WIG; 1R	WIG; 3R	WIG; 2R	WIG; 1R
2026	HIL; 1R	HIL; 1R	WIG; 2R	WIG; 1R	LEI; 2R	LEI; 4R	LEI; 2R	LEI; 2R	WIG; 2R	WIG; 3R	MIL; 1R	MIL; 1R	HIL; 1R	HIL; 3R	LEI; 2R	LEI; 1R	LEI; 1R	LEI; 1R	MIL; 2R	MIL; 2R	WIG; 1R	WIG; 1R	LEI; 1R	LEI; 1R	HIL; 1R	HIL; 1R	HIL; 2R	HIL; 1R	ROS; 1R	ROS; 1R	ROS; 1R	ROS; 1R	LEI; 1R	LEI; 2R

Performance Table Legend
W	Won the tournament	F	Finalist	SF	Semifinalist	QF	Quarterfinalist	#R; RR; Prel.	Lost in # round Round-robin; Preliminary round	DQ	Disqualified
DNQ	Did not qualify	DNP	Did not participate	WD	Withdrew	NH	Tournament not held	#R; RR; Prel.	Lost in # round Round-robin; Preliminary round	NYF	Not yet founded
