= 2025 UK Open =

2025 Ladbrokes UK Open

Tournament information
- Dates: 28 February–2 March 2025
- Venue: Butlin's
- Location: Minehead, England
- Organization(s): Professional Darts Corporation (PDC)
- Format: Legs; Final – best of 21
- Prize fund: £600,000
- Winner's share: £110,000
- High checkout: 170; Chris Hartrey; Jermaine Wattimena; Haupai Puha; Niko Springer; Thomas Lovely

Champion(s)
- Luke Littler (ENG)

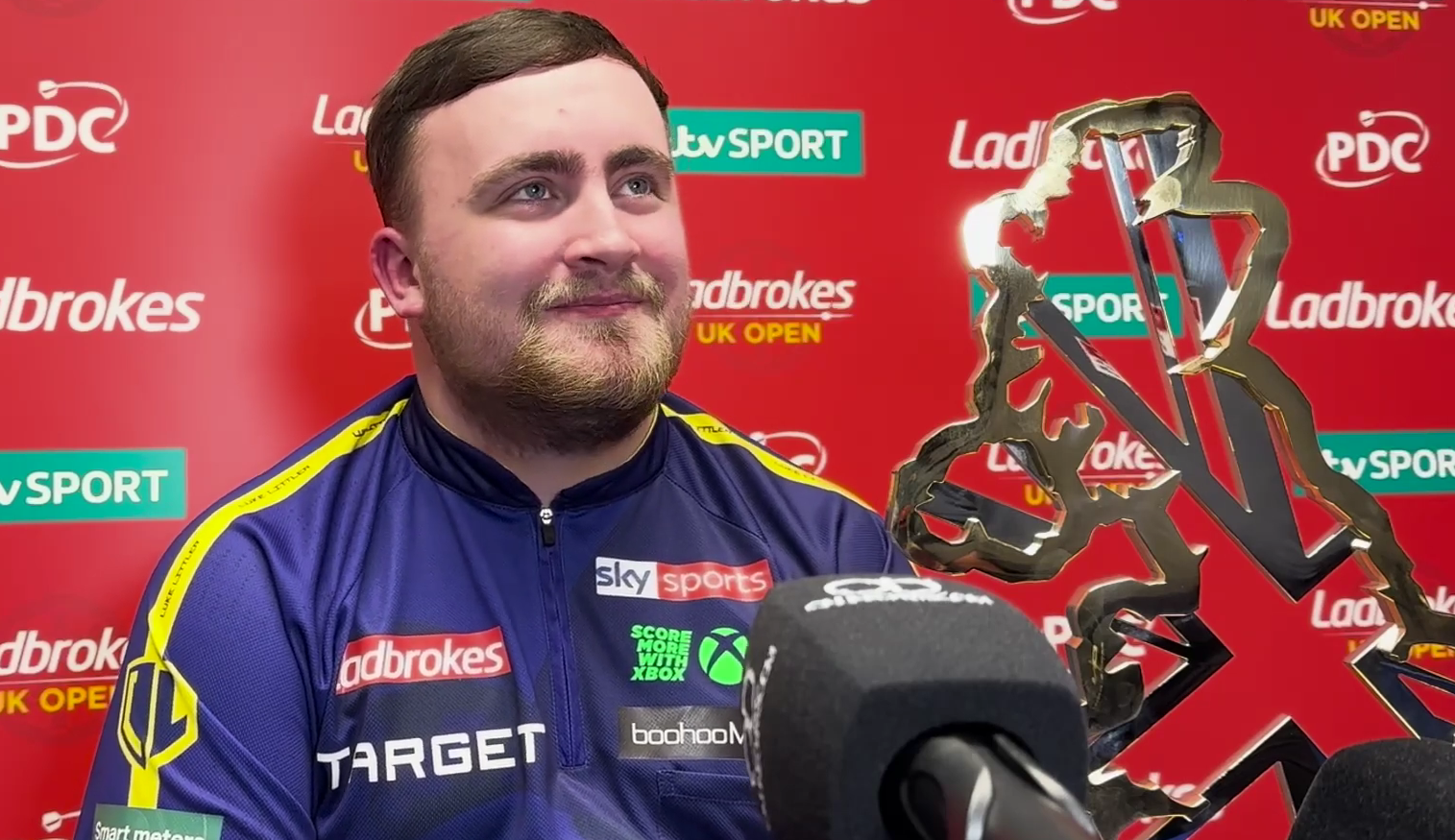
Luke Littler, pictured with the UK Open trophy, won the competition for the first time in his career.

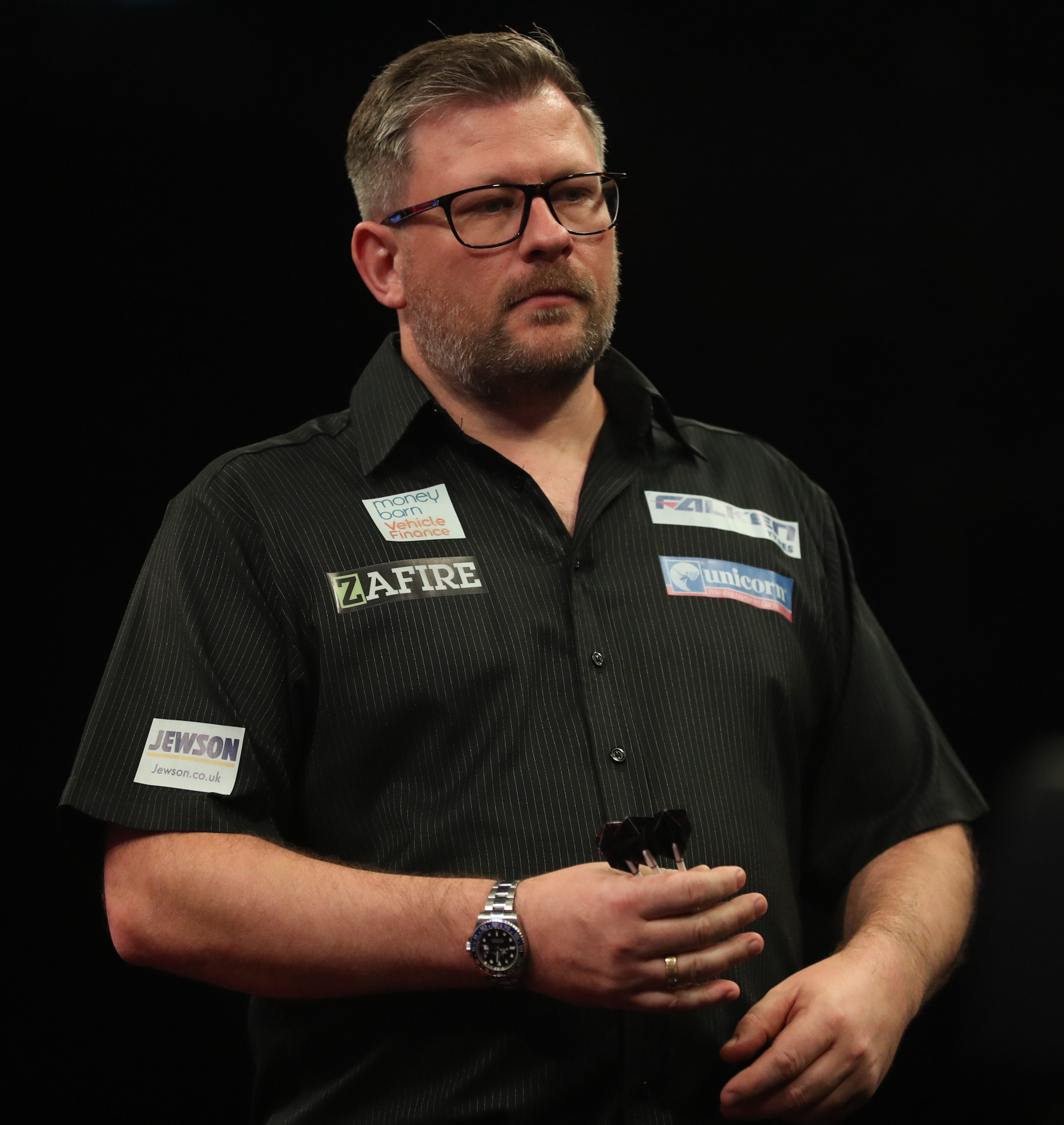
Three-time champion James Wade was defeated in the final.

The 2025 UK Open (known for sponsorship reasons as the 2025 Ladbrokes UK Open) was a professional darts tournament that was held from 28 February to 2 March 2025 at Butlin's in Minehead, England. It was the twenty-third UK Open to be staged by the Professional Darts Corporation. The tournament featured 158 participants which comprised PDC Tour Card holders, Challenge Tour/Development Tour players and amateur qualifiers.

Dimitri Van den Bergh was the defending champion after defeating Luke Humphries 11–10 in the 2024 final. However, he lost 10–3 to Michael Smith in the sixth round.

Luke Littler won his first UK Open title, defeating three-time UK Open champion James Wade 11–2 in the final.

== Overview ==
The 2025 UK Open was the 23rd UK Open organised by the Professional Darts Corporation after its inception in 2003 and was held from 28 February to 2 March 2025 at Butlin's Minehead Resort in Minehead, England. The tournament is commonly referred to as the "FA Cup of darts" due to its round-by-round open draw system. British gambling company Ladbrokes continued their sponsorship of the event after becoming tournament sponsor the previous year. Dimitri Van den Bergh was the defending champion, having defeated Luke Humphries 11–10 in the 2024 final to win his first UK Open and second PDC major title.

=== Format ===
The 158 participants entered the competition incrementally, with 64 players entering in the first round. Match winners joined the 32 players entering in the second and third rounds to leave the last 64 in the fourth round.

- No players were seeded.
- A random draw was held for each of the following rounds following the conclusion of the third round.
- All matches in the first, second and third rounds were played over best of 11 legs.
- All matches in the fourth, fifth and sixth rounds and quarter-finals were played over best of 19 legs.
- All matches in the semi-finals and final were played over best of 21 legs.
- Eight boards were used for matches in the first, second, third and fourth rounds.
- Four boards were used for matches in the fifth round.
- Two boards were used for matches in the sixth round.
- One board was used for all the matches in the quarter-finals, semi-finals and final.

=== Prize money ===
The prize fund remained unchanged at £600,000.

| Stage (no. of players) | | Prize money (Total: £600,000) |
|---|---|---|
| Winner | (1) | £110,000 |
| Runner-up | (1) | £50,000 |
| Semi-finalists | (2) | £30,000 |
| Quarter-finalists | (4) | £15,000 |
| Last 16 (sixth round) | (8) | £10,000 |
| Last 32 (fifth round) | (16) | £5,000 |
| Last 64 (fourth round) | (32) | £2,500 |
| Last 96 (third round) | (32) | £1,500 |
| Last 128 (second round) | (32) | £1,000 |
| Last 160 (first round) | (32) | n/a |

== Qualifiers ==
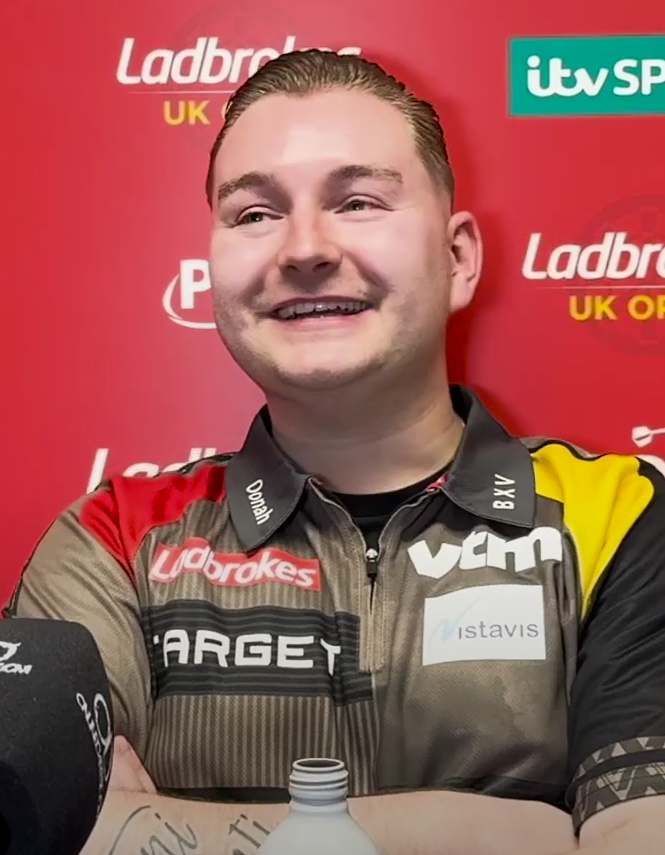
Dimitri Van den Bergh was the defending champion going into the tournament.

The 128 Tour Card holders had a staggered entry based on their PDC Order of Merit ranking on 19 February 2025. They were joined by the top eight non-qualified players from each of the 2024 Challenge & Development Tour Orders of Merit and 16 amateur qualifiers.

Tim Wolters and Jeffrey de Graaf, who were drawn in the second and third rounds respectively, withdrew from the competition. Wolters' opponent – Danny Lauby – received a bye to the third round, while Adam Hunt – who would have played De Graaf in the third round – received a bye to the fourth round.

=== Tour Card Holders ranked 1–32 (receiving byes into fourth round) ===
1. Luke Humphries (quarter-finals)
2. Luke Littler (champion)
3. Michael van Gerwen (fifth round)
4. Rob Cross (sixth round)
5. Stephen Bunting (fourth round)
6. Jonny Clayton (semi-finals)
7. Dave Chisnall (fifth round)
8. Chris Dobey (fifth round)
9. Gerwyn Price (fourth round)
10. Damon Heta (sixth round)
11. Nathan Aspinall (quarter-finals)
12. Peter Wright (fourth round)
13. Danny Noppert (fifth round)
14. James Wade (runner-up)
15. Gary Anderson (fourth round)
16. Dimitri Van den Bergh (sixth round)
17. Josh Rock (semi-finals)
18. Ryan Searle (fifth round)
19. Ross Smith (fifth round)
20. Michael Smith (quarter-finals)
21. Andrew Gilding (fourth round)
22. Martin Schindler (sixth round)
23. Joe Cullen (fourth round)
24. Mike De Decker (fourth round)
25. Daryl Gurney (fourth round)
26. Dirk van Duijvenbode (fourth round)
27. Gian van Veen (quarter-finals)
28. Ritchie Edhouse (fourth round)
29. Ryan Joyce (sixth round)
30. Ricardo Pietreczko (fourth round)
31. Krzysztof Ratajski (sixth round)
32. Brendan Dolan (fourth round)

=== Tour Card Holders ranked 33–64 (receiving byes into third round) ===
33. Luke Woodhouse (fourth round)
34. Raymond van Barneveld (fourth round)
35. Jermaine Wattimena (fifth round)
36. Scott Williams (fourth round)
37. Gabriel Clemens (third round)
38. Martin Lukeman (fourth round)
39. Cameron Menzies (fifth round)
40. Callan Rydz (third round)
41. Kevin Doets (fourth round)
42. Mickey Mansell (third round)
43. Ricky Evans (fourth round)
44. Madars Razma (fifth round)
45. José de Sousa (fourth round)
46. Kim Huybrechts (fourth round)
47. Niels Zonneveld (third round)
48. Richard Veenstra (third round)
49. William O'Connor (sixth round)
50. Keane Barry (third round)
51. Ian White (third round)
52. Wessel Nijman (third round)
53. Florian Hempel (third round)
54. Jim Williams (third round)
55. Matt Campbell (fourth round)
56. Alan Soutar (fifth round)
57. Nick Kenny (fourth round)
58. Ryan Meikle (third round)
59. Robert Owen (sixth round)
60. Mensur Suljović (fifth round)
61. Connor Scutt (fifth round)
62. Dylan Slevin (fifth round)
63. Stephen Burton (fifth round)
64. ~~Jeffrey de Graaf~~ (Note: Withdrew after tournament draw)

=== Tour Card Holders ranked 65–96 (receiving byes into second round) ===
65. Thibault Tricole (second round)
66. James Hurrell (second round)
67. Dom Taylor (third round)
68. Chris Landman (second round)
69. Mario Vandenbogaerde (fourth round)
70. Andy Baetens (second round)
71. Rhys Griffin (second round)
72. Berry van Peer (third round)
73. Radek Szagański (fourth round)
74. Nathan Rafferty (third round)
75. Steve Lennon (second round)
76. Jelle Klaasen (second round)
77. Jitse van der Wal (second round)
78. Lukas Wenig (third round)
79. Patrick Geeraets (second round)
80. Darren Beveridge (third round)
81. Matthew Dennant (third round)
82. Owen Bates (second round)
83. Danny Lauby (fifth round)
84. William Borland (fourth round)
85. Benjamin Reus (second round)
86. Adam Hunt (fourth round)
87. George Killington (fourth round)
88. Robert Grundy (second round)
89. Brett Claydon (second round)
90. Haupai Puha (fourth round)
91. Martijn Dragt (third round)
92. Joshua Richardson (second round)
93. Michele Turetta (second round)
94. ~~Tim Wolters~~
95. Bradley Brooks (second round)
96. Justin Hood (fourth round)

=== Tour Card Holders ranked 97–128 (starting in first round) ===
97. Darryl Pilgrim (first round)
98. Karel Sedláček (first round)
99. Cam Crabtree (third round)
100. Jules van Dongen (first round)
101. Andy Boulton (second round)
102. Tavis Dudeney (first round)
103. Thomas Lovely (fourth round)
104. Maik Kuivenhoven (second round)
105. Cor Dekker (first round)
106. Wesley Plaisier (first round)
107. Niko Springer (third round)
108. Rusty-Jake Rodriguez (second round)
109. Oskar Lukasiak (first round)
110. Tom Bissell (first round)
111. Jim Long (second round)
112. Adam Paxton (first round)
113. Christian Kist (third round)
114. Stefaan Henderyck (second round)
115. Sebastian Białecki (third round)
116. Adam Lipscombe (fourth round)
117. Marvin van Velzen (third round)
118. Maximilian Czerwinski (first round)
119. Tytus Kanik (first round)
120. Max Hopp (first round)
121. Kai Gotthardt (first round)
122. Leon Weber (first round)
123. Pero Ljubić (first round)
124. Adam Warner (first round)
125. Dennie Olde Kalter (first round)
126. Dominik Grüllich (third round)
127. Greg Ritchie (third round)
128. Viktor Tingström (first round)

=== PDC Development Tour qualifiers (starting in first round) ===
The top 8 ranked players from the 2024 Development Tour Order of Merit who don't have a Tour Card for the 2025 season qualified for the first round.

1. Danny Jansen (first round)
2. Beau Greaves (fourth round)
3. Jurjen van der Velde (fifth round)
4. Henry Coates (first round)
5. Owen Roelofs (first round)
6. Charlie Manby (first round)
7. Daniel Perry (first round)
8. Nathan Girvan (third round)

=== PDC Challenge Tour qualifiers (starting in first round) ===
The top 8 ranked players from the 2024 Challenge Tour Order of Merit who don't have a Tour Card for the 2025 season qualified for the first round.

1. Alexander Merkx (second round)
2. Andreas Harrysson (second round)
3. Jimmy van Schie (third round)
4. John Henderson (first round)
5. Stefan Bellmont (first round)
6. Aden Kirk (second round)
7. Lee Cocks (first round)
8. Darius Labanauskas (second round)

=== Amateur qualifiers (starting in first round) ===
In a change from last year, the amateur qualifiers were held in four 'PDC in the Community' events in Pencoed, Newport, Derbyshire and Plymouth. The remaining 12 qualifiers were decided in amateur qualifiers staged by the PDC in Milton Keynes and Wigan. Entry to these tournaments was open to all players who did not hold a 2025 Tour Card and had not qualified via another method.

- Shaun Fox (Milton Keynes) (second round)
- Graham Usher (Milton Keynes) (third round)
- Tom Sykes (Milton Keynes) (third round)
- Graham Hall (Milton Keynes) (second round)
- Derek Coulson (Wigan) (first round)
- Tommy Morris (Wigan) (second round)
- Tommy Lishman (Wigan) (third round)
- Paul Rowley (Wigan) (second round)
- Scott Baker (Qualifier OOM) (first round)
- Danny van Trijp (Qualifier OOM) (second round)
- Jamie Kelling (Qualifier OOM) (first round)
- Christopher Wickenden (Qualifier OOM) (first round)
- Simon Stevenson (Plymouth) (second round)
- Marc Dewsbury (Derbyshire) (first round)
- Mike Gillet (Pencoed) (first round)
- Chris Hartrey (Newport) (first round)

== Draw ==
The draw for the first three rounds was announced on 20 February. Match winners are shown in bold and all players are accompanied by their three-dart average for the match.

CT = Challenge Tour
DT = Development Tour
Q = Amateur qualifier

=== Friday 28 February ===
==== First round (best of eleven legs) ====
| Player | Score | Player | Player | Score | Player |
|---|---|---|---|---|---|
| **Darryl Pilgrim** 88.07 | **6** – 3 | Chris Hartrey (Q) 83.49 | Tavis Dudeney 76.42 | 0 – **6** | **Graham Hall (Q)** 86.71 |
| Wesley Plaisier 88.35 | 1 – **6** | **Cam Crabtree** 99.94 | **Christian Kist** 76.20 | **6** – 4 | Daniel Perry (DT) 77.02 |
| **Adam Lipscombe** 93.94 | **6** – 0 | Marc Dewsbury (Q) 77.25 | Maximilian Czerwinski 77.80 | 4 – **6** | **Maik Kuivenhoven** 85.03 |
| **Paul Rowley (Q)** 84.56 | **6** – 1 | Karel Sedláček 83.08 | Derek Coulson (Q) 88.88 | 4 – **6** | **Darius Labanauskas (CT)** 92.47 |
| **Greg Ritchie** 96.81 | **6** – 3 | Jamie Kelling (Q) 90.34 | Mike Gillet (Q) 85.29 | 2 – **6** | **Rusty-Jake Rodriguez** 85.79 |
| **Marvin van Velzen** 79.40 | **6** – 3 | Tom Bissell 83.88 | Leon Weber 80.49 | 1 – **6** | **Alexander Merkx (CT)** 94.31 |
| **Simon Stevenson (Q)** 84.28 | **6** – 0 | Jules van Dongen 61.11 | Owen Roelofs (DT) 81.13 | 5 – **6** | **Tom Sykes (Q)** 87.48 |
| Dennie Olde Kalter 75.20 | 2 – **6** | **Andy Boulton** 84.73 | **Jurjen van der Velde (DT)** 91.70 | **6** – 2 | Tytus Kanik 81.94 |
| Christopher Wickenden (Q) 86.36 | 3 – **6** | **Nathan Girvan (DT)** 95.64 | Lee Cocks (CT) 77.66 | 1 – **6** | **Stefaan Henderyck** 80.72 |
| Oskar Lukasiak 76.63 | 1 – **6** | **Thomas Lovely** 86.45 | Scott Baker (Q) 82.21 | 3 – **6** | **Andreas Harrysson (CT)** 86.71 |
| **Danny van Trijp (Q)** 84.66 | **6** – 5 | Henry Coates (DT) 84.75 | **Beau Greaves (DT)** 95.97 | **6** – 1 | Stefan Bellmont (CT) 84.09 |
| Cor Dekker 94.88 | 2 – **6** | **Niko Springer** 115.92 | Adam Warner 83.84 | 1 – **6** | **Tommy Morris (Q)** 86.57 |
| **Tommy Lishman (Q)** 90.86 | **6** – 4 | Kai Gotthardt 84.65 | **Sebastian Białecki** 79.97 | **6** – 2 | Viktor Tingström 78.04 |
| John Henderson (CT) 80.98 | 3 – **6** | **Graham Usher (Q)** 85.05 | **Shaun Fox (Q)** 93.94 | **6** – 0 | Max Hopp 78.97 |
| Danny Jansen (DT) 82.66 | 3 – **6** | **Dominik Grüllich** 85.48 | Charlie Manby (DT) 87.30 | 4 – **6** | **Aden Kirk (CT)** 86.01 |
| **Jimmy van Schie (CT)** 90.06 | **6** – 4 | Adam Paxton 83.26 | Pero Ljubić 84.32 | 4 – **6** | **Jim Long** 92.15 |

==== Second round (best of eleven legs) ====
| Player | Score | Player | Player | Score | Player |
|---|---|---|---|---|---|
| Darius Labanauskas (CT) 88.44 | 5 – **6** | **Mario Vandenbogaerde** 89.81 | **Darren Beveridge** 87.74 | **6** – 4 | James Hurrell 88.58 |
| Joshua Richardson 85.93 | 5 – **6** | **Marvin van Velzen** 90.22 | Jim Long 82.74 | 4 – **6** | **Nathan Rafferty** 78.92 |
| Alexander Merkx (CT) 87.57 | 3 – **6** | **Nathan Girvan (DT)** 91.69 | **Tommy Lishman (Q)** 88.08 | **6** – 5 | Michele Turetta 88.31 |
| **Berry van Peer** 95.28 | **6** – 3 | Danny van Trijp (Q) 93.09 | Jitse van der Wal 75.51 | 2 – **6** | **Darryl Pilgrim** 85.53 |
| **Martijn Dragt** 94.19 | **6** – 4 | Graham Hall (Q) 90.77 | **Matthew Dennant** 91.12 | **6** – 3 | Andy Boulton 86.98 |
| Shaun Fox (Q) 90.59 | 3 – **6** | **Justin Hood** 99.97 | Thibault Tricole 87.03 | 1 – **6** | **Tom Sykes (Q)** 101.02 |
| **Lukas Wenig** 86.55 | **6** – 5 | Paul Rowley (Q) 82.58 | **Radek Szagański** 88.76 | **6** – 5 | Benjamin Reus 87.57 |
| Andreas Harrysson (CT) 92.45 | 2 – **6** | **Dominik Grüllich** 101.37 | **Jurjen van der Velde (DT)** 82.74 | **6** – 2 | Bradley Brooks 79.24 |
| Chris Landman 82.35 | 1 – **6** | **Christian Kist** 82.00 | Jelle Klaasen 91.53 | 4 – **6** | **Adam Lipscombe** 90.08 |
| **William Borland** 87.21 | **6** – 2 | Brett Claydon 83.25 | Rhys Griffin 78.47 | 1 – **6** | **Beau Greaves (DT)** 88.95 |
| **Graham Usher (Q)** 78.37 | **6** – 1 | Rusty-Jake Rodriguez 80.79 | Tommy Morris (Q) 87.76 | 1 – **6** | **Greg Ritchie** 91.43 |
| Andy Baetens 90.87 | 1 – **6** | **Cam Crabtree** 93.92 | **George Killington** 88.75 | **6** – 5 | Owen Bates 90.29 |
| **Thomas Lovely** 94.06 | **6** – 4 | Stefaan Henderyck 87.00 | **Jimmy van Schie (CT)** 93.86 | **6** – 5 | Simon Stevenson (Q) 92.87 |
| Aden Kirk (CT) 82.77 | 2 – **6** | **Haupai Puha** 84.75 | **Niko Springer** 97.94 | **6** – 5 | Patrick Geeraets 98.13 |
| **Danny Lauby** | **w/o** | ~~Tim Wolters~~ | Steve Lennon 91.33 | 5 – **6** | **Dom Taylor** 94.22 |
| **Adam Hunt** 88.90 | **6** – 4 | Maik Kuivenhoven 88.10 | Robert Grundy 81.64 | 4 – **6** | **Sebastian Białecki** 85.35 |

==== Third round (best of eleven legs) ====
| Player | Score | Player | Player | Score | Player |
|---|---|---|---|---|---|
| Tom Sykes (Q) 96.55 | 4 – **6** | **William O'Connor** 98.06 | Graham Usher (Q) 84.44 | 4 – **6** | **Raymond van Barneveld** 86.51 |
| **Madars Razma** 94.23 | **6** – 1 | Ryan Meikle 89.72 | **José de Sousa** 92.84 | **6** – 4 | Jimmy van Schie (CT) 93.75 |
| Darryl Pilgrim 87.26 | 3 – **6** | **Danny Lauby** 92.24 | **Mensur Suljović** 93.40 | **6** – 1 | Nathan Rafferty 82.96 |
| Callan Rydz 85.83 | 0 – **6** | **Alan Soutar** 98.02 | **Radek Szagański** 98.05 | **6** – 4 | Cam Crabtree 92.29 |
| Nathan Girvan (DT) 87.02 | 5 – **6** | **Matt Campbell** 87.02 | Lukas Wenig 92.71 | 4 – **6** | **Kim Huybrechts** 91.87 |
| Matthew Dennant 85.29 | 3 – **6** | **Thomas Lovely** 87.18 | **Jermaine Wattimena** 96.84 | **6** – 3 | Florian Hempel 92.88 |
| Martijn Dragt 79.40 | 5 – **6** | **William Borland** 82.60 | **Beau Greaves (DT)** 96.28 | **6** – 2 | Mickey Mansell 91.33 |
| Richard Veenstra 97.95 | 4 – **6** | **Mario Vandenbogaerde** 99.00 | Berry van Peer 95.96 | 3 – **6** | **Connor Scutt** 94.61 |
| **Haupai Puha** 89.40 | **6** – 4 | Christian Kist 87.54 | **Nick Kenny** 88.55 | **6** – 3 | Dominik Grüllich 89.61 |
| **Justin Hood** 87.85 | **6** – 3 | Darren Beveridge 88.09 | **Scott Williams** 93.56 | **6** – 4 | Wessel Nijman 89.48 |
| **Robert Owen** 98.92 | **6** – 5 | Niels Zonneveld 98.09 | Marvin van Velzen 92.52 | 4 – **6** | **George Killington** 90.34 |
| ~~Jeffrey de Graaf~~ | **w/o** | **Adam Hunt** | Keane Barry 90.09 | 3 – **6** | **Jurjen van der Velde (DT)** 91.31 |
| Jim Williams 90.37 | 5 – **6** | **Martin Lukeman** 91.88 | **Ricky Evans** 98.93 | **6** – 5 | Gabriel Clemens 100.94 |
| Tommy Lishman (Q) 82.10 | 3 – **6** | **Stephen Burton** 88.22 | Niko Springer 86.26 | 5 – **6** | **Dylan Slevin** 92.03 |
| Ian White 86.51 | 4 – **6** | **Adam Lipscombe** 89.55 | **Kevin Doets** 100.24 | **6** – 2 | Greg Ritchie 85.96 |
| Dom Taylor 95.20 | 5 – **6** | **Cameron Menzies** 98.12 | Sebastian Białecki 99.34 | 3 – **6** | **Luke Woodhouse** 96.96 |

==== Fourth round (best of nineteen legs) ====
| Player | Score | Player | Player | Score | Player |
|---|---|---|---|---|---|
| **Stephen Burton** 91.46 | **10** – 6 | Radek Szagański 87.84 | Luke Woodhouse 85.86 | 6 – **10** | **Mensur Suljović** 93.86 |
| **Ryan Searle** 92.53 | **10** – 7 | Adam Hunt 92.25 | José de Sousa 87.72 | 7 – **10** | **Ross Smith** 90.60 |
| **Dave Chisnall** 85.36 | **10** – 9 | Ricky Evans 89.27 | **Jurjen van der Velde (DT)** 86.87 | **10** – 6 | Adam Lipscombe 84.61 |
| **Martin Schindler** 92.28 | **10** – 7 | Mario Vandenbogaerde 85.23 | **Dimitri Van den Bergh** 86.46 | **10** – 6 | Raymond van Barneveld 83.05 |
| Daryl Gurney 85.73 | 2 – **10** | **Danny Noppert** 96.10 | Justin Hood 88.19 | 5 – **10** | **Josh Rock** 96.13 |
| Scott Williams 98.06 | 7 – **10** | **William O'Connor** 96.98 | Brendan Dolan 83.05 | 9 – **10** | **Danny Lauby** 86.46 |
| Kevin Doets 92.53 | 6 – **10** | **Michael Smith** 95.03 | **Madars Razma** 92.67 | **10** – 9 | Ricardo Pietreczko 82.45 |
| **Alan Soutar** 96.18 | **10** – 7 | Matt Campbell 92.94 | **Damon Heta** 91.31 | **10** – 2 | Kim Huybrechts 81.41 |
| Gerwyn Price 95.26 | 9 – **10** | **Connor Scutt** 99.62 | **Michael van Gerwen** 97.03 | **10** – 8 | Dirk van Duijvenbode 99.92 |
| **Cameron Menzies** 92.43 | **10** – 4 | Mike De Decker 85.97 | Stephen Bunting 94.59 | 6 – **10** | **Chris Dobey** 95.87 |
| Joe Cullen 92.86 | 4 – **10** | **Krzysztof Ratajski** 95.50 | Thomas Lovely 86.53 | 4 – **10** | **Rob Cross** 89.75 |
| Martin Lukeman 90.13 | 5 – **10** | **Nathan Aspinall** 95.10 | Ritchie Edhouse 88.95 | 6 – **10** | **Jermaine Wattimena** 97.41 |
| Beau Greaves (DT) 92.67 | 7 – **10** | **Luke Humphries** 102.45 | Peter Wright 101.79 | 9 – **10** | **Luke Littler** 108.69 |
| **Jonny Clayton** 97.86 | **10** – 3 | Gary Anderson 100.07 | Nick Kenny 87.99 | 4 – **10** | **Gian van Veen** 97.12 |
| **Dylan Slevin** 85.86 | **10** – 7 | Haupai Puha 83.15 | **Ryan Joyce** 95.59 | **10** – 8 | Andrew Gilding 90.25 |
| **James Wade** 93.64 | **10** – 3 | William Borland 87.32 | **Robert Owen** 92.05 | **10** – 7 | George Killington 94.91 |

=== Saturday 1 March ===
==== Fifth round (best of nineteen legs) ====
| Player | Score | Player | Player | Score | Player |
|---|---|---|---|---|---|
| Ryan Searle 92.42 | 0 – **10** | **Luke Humphries** 100.20 | Jurjen van der Velde (DT) 88.66 | 2 – **10** | **Nathan Aspinall** 91.73 |
| Dave Chisnall 90.42 | 8 – **10** | **Krzysztof Ratajski** 97.24 | Cameron Menzies 94.83 | 9 – **10** | **James Wade** 92.10 |
| Mensur Suljović 92.24 | 3 – **10** | **William O'Connor** 100.67 | **Robert Owen** 90.56 | **10** – 8 | Michael van Gerwen 95.00 |
| **Rob Cross** 97.57 | **10** – 9 | Danny Noppert 101.02 | **Luke Littler** 104.21 | **10** – 4 | Jermaine Wattimena 101.11 |
| **Josh Rock** 104.82 | **10** – 9 | Ross Smith 101.39 | **Dimitri Van den Bergh** 94.60 | **10** – 9 | Chris Dobey 94.32 |
| Madars Razma 90.13 | 7 – **10** | **Michael Smith** 94.96 | **Martin Schindler** 94.66 | **10** – 9 | Dylan Slevin 90.68 |
| Alan Soutar 94.86 | 7 – **10** | **Jonny Clayton** 96.85 | Danny Lauby 82.94 | 3 – **10** | **Ryan Joyce** 91.59 |
| **Gian van Veen** 97.26 | **10** – 7 | Stephen Burton 97.46 | Connor Scutt 95.19 | 7 – **10** | **Damon Heta** 93.24 |

==== Sixth round (best of nineteen legs) ====
| Player | Score | Player | Player | Score | Player |
|---|---|---|---|---|---|
| **Josh Rock** 99.92 | **10** – 6 | Rob Cross 95.05 | Robert Owen 90.24 | 8 – **10** | **James Wade** 95.00 |
| Krzysztof Ratajski 97.77 | 8 – **10** | **Luke Littler** 97.99 | Ryan Joyce 92.93 | 2 – **10** | **Luke Humphries** 101.59 |
| Martin Schindler 90.90 | 4 – **10** | **Jonny Clayton** 98.04 | Damon Heta 98.85 | 9 – **10** | **Gian van Veen** 109.90 |
| **Nathan Aspinall** 98.61 | **10** – 8 | William O'Connor 93.14 | **Michael Smith** 89.24 | **10** – 3 | Dimitri Van den Bergh 70.90 |

=== Sunday 2 March ===
==== Quarter-finals (best of nineteen legs) ====
| Player | Score | Player |
|---|---|---|
| Gian van Veen 99.82 | 4 – **10** | **Luke Littler** 107.30 |
| **Josh Rock** 99.35 | **10** – 7 | Nathan Aspinall 98.45 |
| **Jonny Clayton** 92.14 | **10** – 8 | Michael Smith 93.17 |
| **James Wade** 99.89 | **10** – 9 | Luke Humphries 102.08 |

==== Semi-finals and Final (best of twenty-one legs) ====
**Semi-finals**
Jonny Clayton 95.61 | 6
**Luke Littler** 106.62 | **11**
Josh Rock 95.52 | 2
**James Wade** 99.53 | **11**

**Final**
**Luke Littler** 101.51 | **11**
James Wade 88.06 | 2

== Media coverage ==
The main stage boards are broadcast on ITV4 (Friday, Saturday afternoon and Sunday) and on ITV3 (Saturday evening) in the United Kingdom, DAZN in Germany, Austria and Switzerland and Viaplay in the Netherlands. All boards are broadcast on the PDC.tv live streaming platform.

== Top averages ==
The table lists all players who achieved an average of at least 100 in a match. In the case one player has multiple records, this is indicated by the number in brackets.

| # | Player | Round | Average | Result |
|---|---|---|---|---|
| 1 | Niko Springer | 1st Round | 115.92 | Won |
| 2 | Gian van Veen | 6th Round | 109.90 | Won |
| 3 | Luke Littler | 4th Round | 108.69 | Won |
| 4 | Luke Littler (2) | Quarter Final | 107.30 | Won |
| 5 | Luke Littler (3) | Semi Final | 106.62 | Won |
| 6 | Josh Rock | 5th Round | 104.82 | Won |
| 7 | Luke Littler (4) | 5th Round | 104.21 | Won |
| 8 | Luke Humphries | 4th Round | 102.45 | Won |
| 9 | Luke Humphries (2) | Quarter Final | 102.08 | Lost |
| 10 | Peter Wright | 4th Round | 101.79 | Lost |
| 11 | Luke Humphries (3) | 6th Round | 101.59 | Won |
| 12 | Luke Littler (5) | Final | 101.51 | Won |
| 13 | Ross Smith | 5th Round | 101.39 | Lost |
| 14 | Dominik Grüllich | 2nd Round | 101.37 | Won |
| 15 | Jermaine Wattimena | 5th Round | 101.11 | Lost |
| 16 | Tom Sykes | 2nd Round | 101.02 | Won |
| 16 | Danny Noppert | 5th Round | 101.02 | Lost |
| 18 | Gabriel Clemens | 3rd Round | 100.94 | Lost |
| 19 | William O'Connor | 5th Round | 100.67 | Won |
| 20 | Kevin Doets | 3rd Round | 100.24 | Won |
| 21 | Luke Humphries (4) | 5th Round | 100.20 | Won |
| 22 | Gary Anderson | 4th Round | 100.07 | Lost |
