= Alexander Merkx =

Dutch darts player (born 1994)

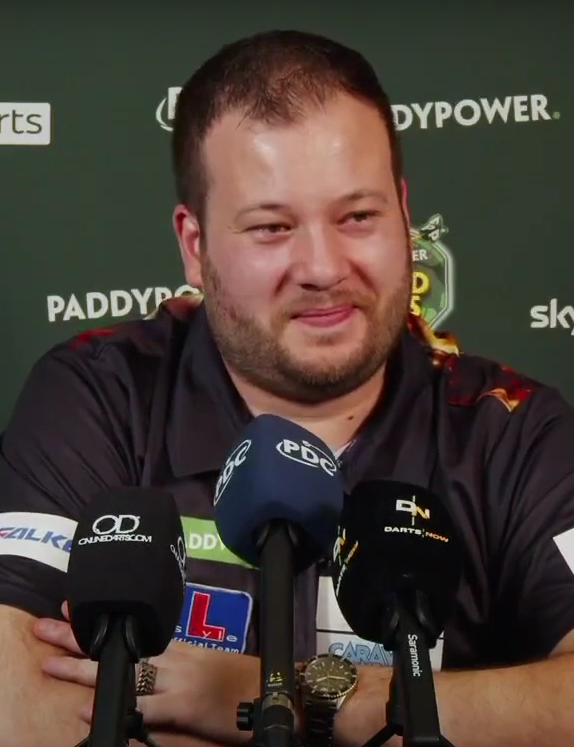
- Merkx at the 2025 World Championship

Personal information
- Nickname: "Alexander the Great"
- Born: 20 March 1994 (age 32) Dommelen, North Brabant, Netherlands
- Home town: Hapert, North Brabant, Netherlands

Sport
- Sport: Darts
- Playing since: 2003
- Darts: 22g Bull's Signature
- Laterality: Right-handed
- Walk-on music: "Happy Together" by Dimitri Vegas & Like Mike

Organisation (see split in darts)
- BDO: 2013–2020
- PDC: 2019–present (Tour Card: 2026–present)
- WDF: 2013–2025
- Current world ranking: (PDC) 94 (29 October 2026)

WDF major events – best performances
- World Championship: Last 16: 2023
- World Masters: Last 16: 2022
- Dutch Open: Last 32: 2012, 2022

PDC premier events – best performances
- World Championship: Last 64: 2025
- UK Open: Last 128: 2025

Other tournament wins
- Years
Lithuania Open	2022
Helvetia Open	2022
Romanian Open	2024
PDC Challenge Tour	2024 (×2)
Medal record
Men's Darts
Representing Netherlands
WDF Europe Cup
Silver medal – second place	2024 Šamorín	Men's overall
Bronze medal – third place	2024 Šamorín	Men's team

Alexander Merkx (born 20 March 1994) is a Dutch darts player who competes in Professional Darts Corporation (PDC) events and previously competed in World Darts Federation (WDF) tournaments. He has won three WDF titles and was the winner of two PDC Challenge Tour titles in 2024. He made his PDC World Darts Championship debut at the 2025 event.

== Career ==
He made his PDC European Tour debut at the 2019 Dutch Darts Masters, but lost 6–1 to Glen Durrant. Merkx also made his first final on the BDO/WDF circuit that year, losing to Martin Barratt 6–3 at the Lithuania Open.

Merkx became a WDF Tour regular in 2022, winning ranking titles in Lithuania and Switzerland. He qualified for the 2023 WDF World Championship, winning his first game against Arjan Konterman before losing to Dennis Nilsson in the Last 16.

Merkx won a third WDF title in January 2024 when he triumphed at the Romanian Open. He claimed his first two PDC Challenge Tour titles during the 2024 season, winning events 16 and 21. By finishing fourth on the 2024 Challenge Tour Order of Merit, Merkx secured a place at the 2025 PDC World Championship, his debut at the tournament. He defeated Stephen Burton 3–0 to progress to the second round, where he lost 3–1 to 15th seed Chris Dobey.

In January 2026, Merkx attended PDC Q-School. In his seventh Q-School attempt, he earned a two-year PDC Tour Card for the first time through his placement on the European Q-School Order of Merit.

== Personal life ==
Merkx is from the village of Hapert in North Brabant, Netherlands. Outside of darts, he works as a caravan salesman.

== World Championship results ==
=== WDF ===
- 2023: Third round (lost to Dennis Nilsson 1–3)

=== PDC ===
- 2025: Second round (lost to Chris Dobey 1–3)

== Performance timeline ==
Alexander Merkx's performance timeline is as follows:

WDF

Tournament	2012	2017	2018	2019	2020	2022	2023	2024
WDF televised events
World Championship	Not held					DNQ	3R	DNQ
World Masters	DNQ		1R	DNQ	NH	5R	NH	5R
Dutch Open	7R	2R	3R	5R	Prel.	7R	3R	4R

PDC

Tournament	2025
PDC Ranked televised events
World Championship	2R
UK Open	2R

=== PDC Players Championships ===
Season	1	2	3	4	5	6	7	8	9	10	11	12	13	14	15	16	17	18	19	20	21	22	23	24	25	26	27	28	29	30	31	32	33	34
2024	Did not participate																							WIG; 2R	WIG; 1R	WIG; 1R	WIG; DNP		LEI; 1R	LEI; 1R				
2025	Did not participate												ROS; 1R	ROS; 2R	HIL; 2R	HIL; 3R	Did not participate					HIL; 1R	HIL; 2R	MIL; 3R	MIL; 2R	HIL; 1R	HIL; QF	LEI; DNP			WIG; 3R	WIG; 1R	WIG; DNP	
2026	HIL; 2R	HIL; 1R	WIG; 2R	WIG; 3R	LEI; DNP		LEI; 4R	LEI; 1R	WIG; 2R	WIG; 2R	MIL; 4R	MIL; 4R	HIL; 3R	HIL; 3R	LEI; 1R	LEI; 1R	LEI; 1R	LEI; 3R	MIL; 1R	MIL; 1R	WIG; 1R	WIG; QF	LEI; 1R	LEI; 1R	HIL; 3R	HIL; 2R	LEI; 2R	LEI; 1R	ROS; 1R	ROS; 2R	ROS; 3R	ROS; 1R	LEI; 2R	LEI; 1R

PDC Challenge Tour

Season	1	2	3	4	5	6	7	8	9	10	11	12	13	14	15	16	17	18	19	20	21	22	23	24
2024	L64	L64	L64	L64	L64	L32	L128	L64	L256	QF	L32	L32	L256	L64	L256	W	L64	L32	L256	L64	W	QF	SF	L64
2025	L128	L128	L32	L256	L32	L128	L32	SF	L64	L128	L32	L16	L32	L32	L16	L32	L32	F	L64	SF	L64	L32	L64	F

Performance Table Legend
W	Won the tournament	F	Finalist	SF	Semifinalist	QF	Quarterfinalist	#R; RR; L#	Lost in # round Round-robin; Last # stage	DQ	Disqualified
DNQ	Did not qualify	DNP	Did not participate	WD	Withdrew	NH	Tournament not held	#R; RR; L#	Lost in # round Round-robin; Last # stage	NYF	Not yet founded
