= Lukas Wenig =

German darts player (born 1994)

Personal information
- Nickname: Luu
- Born: 18 September 1994 (age 32) Marburg, Germany
- Home town: Rottendorf, Germany

Sport
- Sport: Darts
- Playing since: 2017
- Darts: 24g One80
- Laterality: Right-handed
- Walk-on music: "Give It All" by Rise Against "Tanzeid" by Electric Callboy

Organisation (see split in darts)
- PDC: 2017–present (Tour Card: 2024–present)
- Current world ranking: (PDC) 63 (5 November 2026)

WDF major events – best performances
- Dutch Open: Last 32: 2020

PDC premier events – best performances
- World Championship: Last 128: 2026
- UK Open: Last 96: 2022, 2025
- Grand Slam: Quarter-final: 2025

Other tournament wins
- Years
- Modus Super Series Week Winner – 2023

Lukas Wenig (born 18 September 1994) is a German professional darts player who competes in Professional Darts Corporation (PDC) events. He reached his first PDC ranking final at Players Championship 23 on the 2025 PDC Pro Tour. He made his first PDC major quarter-final at the 2025 Grand Slam of Darts.

== Career ==
Wenig qualified for his first PDC European Tour tournament in 2019, when he qualified for the 2019 German Darts Open, but he lost in the first round to Chris Dobey. Wenig has also qualified via different routes for the UK Open, reaching the third round in 2022 before losing to compatriot Florian Hempel. He reached the third round on the European Tour for the first time at the 2022 European Darts Matchplay before being defeated by Luke Humphries.

He missed out on a Tour Card in 2023. In April 2023 Wenig won Week 9 of the 3rd Edition of the Modus Super Series, picking up £5,000 in the process. He reached the final twice on the 2023 Challenge Tour.

In January 2024, Wenig earned a Tour Card at Q-School by finishing tenth on the European Q-School Order of Merit.

== World Championship results ==
=== PDC ===
- 2026: First round (lost to Wesley Plaisier 1–3)

== Performance timeline ==
Tournament	2021	2022	2023	2024	2025	2026
PDC Ranked televised events
World Championship	Did not qualify					1R
World Masters (Note: A non-ranked event until 2025)	Did not qualify				Prel.	Prel.
UK Open	1R	3R	1R	1R	3R	3R
Grand Slam	Did not qualify				QF	DNQ
Career statistics
Season-end ranking (PDC)	163	132	174	102	63	

=== PDC European Tour ===
Season	1	2	3	4	5	6	7	8	9	10	11	12	13	14	15
2019	Did not qualify			GDO; 1R	Did not participate										
2020	BDC; DNP	GDC; 2R	DNQ												
2022	IDO; DNQ	GDC; 1R	GDG; 1R	ADO; DNQ	EDO; 1R	CDO; DNQ	EDG; 1R	DDC; DNQ	EDM; 3R	HDT; DNP	GDO; 1R	DNP			
2023	BSD; 2R	Did not participate/qualify													
2024	BDO; 2R	GDG; 1R	Did not qualify								HDT; 1R	DNQ			
2025	Did not qualify				ADO; 1R	EDG; DNQ	DDC; 1R	EDO; 2R	BSD; DNQ	FDT; 1R	CDO; DNQ	HDT; 1R	SDT; 1R	GDC; DNQ	
2026	PDO; DNQ	EDT; 2R	BDO; 1R	Did not qualify				BSD; 1R	SDO; DNQ	EDO; 1R	Did not qualify				

=== PDC Players Championships ===
Season	1	2	3	4	5	6	7	8	9	10	11	12	13	14	15	16	17	18	19	20	21	22	23	24	25	26	27	28	29	30	31	32	33	34
2021 (Note: Not a Tour card holder)	Did not participate								NIE; 2R	NIE; 2R	NIE; 1R	NIE; 2R	Did not participate								BAR; 2R	BAR; 2R	BAR; 1R	BAR; DNP				BAR; 1R	BAR; 1R	BAR; 1R				
2023	Did not participate						HIL; 2R	HIL; 2R	DNP				HIL; 1R	HIL; 1R	LEI; DNP	LEI; DNP	HIL; 2R	HIL; 1R	Did not participate															
2024	WIG; 2R	WIG; 1R	LEI; 1R	LEI; 2R	HIL; 2R	HIL; 2R	LEI; 1R	LEI; 1R	HIL; 2R	HIL; 2R	HIL; 2R	HIL; 2R	MIL; 1R	MIL; 1R	MIL; 1R	MIL; 1R	MIL; 2R	MIL; 1R	MIL; 3R	WIG; 1R	WIG; 1R	LEI; 1R	LEI; 1R	WIG; 2R	WIG; 4R	WIG; 3R	WIG; 1R	WIG; 2R	LEI; 1R	LEI; 1R				
2025	WIG; 1R	WIG; 1R	ROS; 1R	ROS; 1R	LEI; 4R	LEI; 1R	HIL; 2R	HIL; 1R	LEI; 2R	LEI; 1R	LEI; 2R	LEI; 2R	ROS; 1R	ROS; 1R	HIL; 1R	HIL; 1R	LEI; 1R	LEI; 1R	LEI; 2R	LEI; 1R	LEI; 1R	HIL; 1R	HIL; F	MIL; 1R	MIL; 1R	HIL; 1R	HIL; 2R	LEI; 2R	LEI; 3R	LEI; 1R	WIG; 4R	WIG; 3R	WIG; 1R	WIG; 2R
2026	HIL; 3R	HIL; 2R	WIG; 3R	WIG; 2R	LEI; 2R	LEI; 3R	LEI; 1R	LEI; 1R	WIG; 1R	WIG; 1R	MIL; 2R	MIL; 2R	HIL; 1R	HIL; 4R	LEI; 1R	LEI; 1R	LEI; 2R	LEI; 2R	MIL; 3R	MIL; 3R	WIG; 1R	WIG; 1R	LEI; 1R	LEI; 1R	HIL; 1R	HIL; 1R	LEI; 1R	LEI; 1R	ROS; 2R	ROS; 2R	ROS; 1R	ROS; 3R	LEI; 1R	LEI; 2R

Performance Table Legend
W	Won the tournament	F	Finalist	SF	Semifinalist	QF	Quarterfinalist	#R; RR; Prel.	Lost in # round Round-robin; Preliminary round	DQ	Disqualified
DNQ	Did not qualify	DNP	Did not participate	WD	Withdrew	NH	Tournament not held	#R; RR; Prel.	Lost in # round Round-robin; Preliminary round	NYF	Not yet founded
