= Sebastian Białecki =

Polish darts player (born 2003)

Personal information
- Nickname: "The Bolt"
- Born: 6 December 2003 (age 22) Łódź, Poland

Sport
- Sport: Darts
- Playing since: 2015
- Darts: 22g Target
- Laterality: Right-handed
- Walk-on music: "Freaks" by Timmy Trumpet and Savage

Organisation (see split in darts)
- PDC: 2020–present (Tour Card: 2025–present)
- WDF: 2022–2024
- Current world ranking: (PDC) 51 (5 November 2026)

WDF major events – best performances
- World Championship: Last 32: 2023
- World Masters: Last 128: 2022

PDC premier events – best performances
- World Championship: Last 96: 2023
- World Grand Prix: Last 32: 2026
- UK Open: Quarter-final: 2022
- Grand Slam: Group Stage: 2026
- PC Finals: Last 32: 2025

Other tournament wins
- Years
Denmark Open	2022
PDC Challenge Tour (×2)	2021, 2024
EDF Polish Championship	2022
Players Championships (×2)
2025 PC22, 2026 PC26
Youth events
PDC Development Tour (×12)	2021, 2022; 2023 (×2), 2024; 2025, 2026 (×6)
Polish Junior Championship	2017, 2018
Medal record
Men's Darts
Representing Poland
WDF Europe Cup
Silver medal – second place	2022 Gandía	Men's pairs
EDF European Championship
Gold medal – first place	2019 Podčetrtek	Youth's singles
Gold medal – first place	2023 Podčetrtek	Mixed doubles
Gold medal – first place	2026 Podčetrtek	Men's singles
Bronze medal – third place	2026 Podčetrtek	Mixed doubles

Sebastian Białecki (born 6 December 2003) is a Polish professional soft-tip and steel-tip darts player who competes in Professional Darts Corporation (PDC) events. He is a PDC Tour Card holder and a former UK Open quarter-finalist. He won his first PDC ranking title at Players Championship 22 on the 2025 PDC Pro Tour, having previously won two titles on the PDC's secondary tour, the Challenge Tour. He was also the World Darts Federation's 2022 Denmark Open champion. He is a three-time gold medalist at the EDF European Darts Championship.

Białecki made his PDC major debut at the 2021 UK Open and hit a nine-dart finish in his opening round win. He went on to reach the fourth round where he was beaten by Mensur Suljović. The following year, he reached his first major quarter-final at the 2022 edition. Białecki won a Tour Card for the first time due to his placement on the 2024 Development Tour.

In his youth career, he has won 12 PDC Development Tours, as well as the Polish Junior Championship in 2017 and 2018.

== Career ==
=== Early career ===
Białecki started playing darts in 2015, at the age of 12. Białecki's first significant achievements were winning the Polish Junior Championship twice in 2017 and 2018. In 2019, he took part in international tournaments for the first time. At the beginning of 2020, he took part in PDC Q-School in order to obtain a PDC Tour Card, but was unsuccessful. He also took part in PDC Development Tour tournaments in Hildesheim, Germany, where he reached the Last 32 three times, and reached the semi-finals once, losing the match for the final with Ryan Meikle. In September 2020, he took part in the 2020 PDC World Youth Championship, advancing from group stage to the second round, where he again lost to Meikle, this time 0–6.

=== 2021 ===
In 2021, he took part in Q-School again, but was again unsuccessful. Good results on the Development Tour allowed Białecki to play in the 2021 UK Open. He was the first player in history to be born after the first edition of this tournament. In the first round, he faced Jim McEwan, achieved a nine-dart finish, and won the match 6–2. In the following matches of the tournament, he defeated Jitse Van der Wal (who also hit a nine-dart finish against him) and Derk Telnekes. He was eliminated in the fourth round, losing to Mensur Suljović 6–10.

In September 2021, he won his first PDC Challenge Tour title in Niedernhausen, beating Kevin Doets 5–4 in the final. Two months later, in November 2021, he won his first PDC Development Tour tournament beating Geert Nentjes 5–4 in the final. In November, he also took part in the 2021 PDC World Youth Championship, but was eliminated in the group stage after going winless.

=== 2022 ===
Much like last year, Białecki qualified for the 2022 UK Open as a Development Tour qualifier. In this tournament, he achieved his best PDC result to date, beating Matt Campbell, Joe Murnan, Keegan Brown, Ritchie Edhouse, Ian White and Ryan Searle to reach the quarter-finals. He was eliminated by William O'Connor 9–10, despite having a match dart for a 150 checkout on double 15.

In April 2022, he took part in Denmark Open, his first senior WDF tournament and won the title, beating Ben Hazel, Andy Baetens, Dennis Nilsson, Shaun McDonald along the way before defeating Darren Johnson 6–1 in the final. This win guaranteed him qualification for the 2023 WDF World Darts Championship. In the same month, he took part in East Europe Qualifiers for the PDC European Tour and qualified for three tournaments.

In his European Tour debut at the 2022 Czech Darts Open, he lost 4–6 to Martijn Kleermaker in the first round. He was eliminated in first round of the 2022 Dutch Darts Championship, where he lost 1–6 to Jelle Klaasen. On 4 June 2022, he won his second PDC Development Tour in Hildesheim, beating Keane Barry 5–3 in the final.

Białecki took part in the 2022 PDC World Cup of Darts, representing Poland with Krzysztof Ratajski. In their first match, Poland struggled against Danny Baggish and Jules van Dongen of the US, but Poland won the match in a last leg decider. In the second round, Poland faced Belgium, with Białecki playing Kim Huybrechts in a singles match to start the contest. He lost the match 2–4, with Ratajski's loss to Dimitri van den Bergh sealing Poland's elimination.

At the beginning of July, he played at 2022 European Darts Matchplay. He won his first match on the European Tour with a 6–4 victory against Mervyn King. He lost 5–6 to Stephen Bunting in the second round after Białecki missed a match dart on double 20. At the end of the month, he took part in the soft-tip Polish Darts Championship. In the men's singles he beat Łukasz Wacławski in the final, winning his first senior Polish Darts Championship title and qualified for the second soft-tip EDF European Darts Championship in his career.

At the end of September 2022, he was selected by the national federation to participate in the 2022 WDF Europe Cup. On the second day of the tournament, he advanced to the finals of the pairs competition where he played together with Dariusz Marciniak. They were defeated by England's Joshua Richardson and Scott Williams 2–6.

He participated in the East Europe Qualifier for the 2023 PDC World Darts Championship. On his way to the final, he defeated Michele Turetta, Alexander Mašek and Rusty-Jake Rodriguez. In the final, he faced Christian Gödl and won 7–4.

=== 2023–2024 ===
At the 2023 PDC World Championship, he lost 3–2 to Jim Williams in the first round. He took part in the 2023 WDF World Championship as the reigning Denmark Open champion, being eliminated in the second round by eventual champion Andy Baetens.

In 2024, Białecki participated in the 2024 PDC Development Tour series. He finished 5th on the Development Tour Order of Merit, which meant that he received a two-year PDC Tour Card for the 2025 and 2026 seasons.

=== 2025–present ===
In his first year as a PDC Tour Card holder, Białecki won his maiden senior PDC title in July 2025, defeating Niels Zonneveld 8–6 in the Players Championship 22 final, the first time he had progressed past the last 16 of a Players Championship event. He became the third Polish player to win a PDC ranking title, after Krzysztof Ratajski and Radek Szagański.

Białecki made his second PDC World Championship appearance at the 2026 edition. Facing fourth seed Stephen Bunting in the first round, he recovered from 2–0 down to take the match to a deciding set, which he lost 4–2 in legs. Białecki broke two records on the 2026 PDC Development Tour: he became the first player to win four consecutive Development Tour titles, and compiled the longest unbeaten run in Development Tour history by winning 38 matches in a row. Exactly a year after his first ranking title, he won his second at Players Championship 26 in July 2026, defeating Mario Vandenbogaerde 8–6 in the final.

== World Championship results ==
=== WDF World Championship ===
- 2023: Second round (lost to Andy Baetens 0–3) (sets)

=== PDC World Championship ===
- 2023: First round (lost to Jim Williams 2–3) (sets)
- 2026: First round (lost to Stephen Bunting 2–3)
- 2027:

== Performance timeline ==
=== WDF ===
Tournament	2022	2023
WDF Ranked televised events
World Championship	DNQ	2R
World Masters	2R	NH

=== PDC ===
Tournament	2020	2021	2022	2023	2024	2025	2026
PDC Ranked televised events
World Championship	DNQ			1R	DNQ		1R
World Masters	Did not qualify					Prel.	Prel.
UK Open	DNQ	4R	QF	1R	1R	3R	3R
World Grand Prix	Did not qualify						1R
Grand Slam	Did not qualify						RR
Players Championship Finals	Did not qualify					2R	
PDC Non-ranked televised events
World Cup	DNQ		2R	DNQ			2R
World Youth Championship	2R	RR	3R	SF	3R	SF	4R
Career statistics
Season-end ranking (PDC)	–	164	96	184	167	80	

==== European Tour ====
Season	1	2	3	4	5	6	7	8	9	10	11	12	13	14	15
2022	DNP					CDO; 1R	EDG; DNQ	DDC; 1R	EDM; 2R	Did not participate					
2023	DNQ		IDO; WD	Did not participate/qualify								HDT; 2R	GDC; DNQ		
2024	Did not qualify					BSD; 2R	Did not qualify			FDT; 1R	HDT; 1R	DNQ			
2025	Did not qualify								BSD; 1R	Did not qualify					
2026	PDO; DNQ	EDT; 1R	BDO; 2R	GDG; 1R	DNQ			BSD; 3R	SDO; DNQ	EDO; SF	HDT; DNQ	CDO; DNQ	FDT; 2R	SDT; 1R	DDC; 2R

==== Players Championships ====
Season	1	2	3	4	5	6	7	8	9	10	11	12	13	14	15	16	17	18	19	20	21	22	23	24	25	26	27	28	29	30	31	32	33	34
2021 (Note: Not a Tour card holder)	Did not participate								NIE; 2R	NIE; 1R	NIE; 1R	NIE; 1R	Did not participate																					
2025	WIG; 2R	WIG; 2R	ROS; 1R	ROS; 1R	LEI; 4R	LEI; 4R	HIL; 3R	HIL; 4R	LEI; 4R	LEI; 1R	LEI; 4R	LEI; 1R	ROS; 2R	ROS; 1R	HIL; 3R	HIL; 1R	LEI; 1R	LEI; 1R	LEI; 1R	LEI; 1R	LEI; 1R	HIL; W	HIL; 1R	MIL; 3R	MIL; 2R	HIL; 2R	HIL; 4R	LEI; 1R	LEI; 1R	LEI; 1R	WIG; 1R	WIG; 1R	WIG; 1R	WIG; 1R
2026	HIL; 1R	HIL; 2R	WIG; 1R	WIG; QF	LEI; 4R	LEI; 2R	LEI; 3R	LEI; SF	WIG; 1R	WIG; 1R	MIL; 2R	MIL; 3R	HIL; 3R	HIL; 1R	LEI; 3R	LEI; 2R	LEI; 3R	LEI; QF	MIL; 2R	MIL; 3R	WIG; 3R	WIG; 1R	LEI; 2R	LEI; 3R	HIL; 1R	HIL; W	LEI; 1R	LEI; 3R	ROS; 3R	ROS; 3R	ROS; 1R	ROS; 1R	LEI; 3R	LEI; 2R

Performance Table Legend
W	Won the tournament	F	Finalist	SF	Semifinalist	QF	Quarterfinalist	#R; RR; Prel.	Lost in # round Round-robin; Preliminary round	DQ	Disqualified
DNQ	Did not qualify	DNP	Did not participate	WD	Withdrew	NH	Tournament not held	#R; RR; Prel.	Lost in # round Round-robin; Preliminary round	NYF	Not yet founded

== Nine-dart finishes ==
Sebastian Białecki televised nine-dart finishes
Date	Opponent	Tournament	Method	Prize
2 November 2023	Anton Östlund	MODUS Super Series	3 x T20; 2 x T20, T19; 2 x T20, D12	–
