= 2023 WDF World Darts Championship =

Tournament information
- Dates: 2–10 December 2023
- Venue: Lakeside Country Club
- Location: Frimley Green, Surrey, England
- Organisation(s): World Darts Federation (WDF)
- Format: Sets
- Prize fund: £257,000 (total)
- Winner's share: £50,000 (men) £25,000 (women) £5,000 (boys) £2,000 (girls)
- High checkout: 170 Andy Baetens

Champion(s)
- Andy Baetens (BEL) (men); Beau Greaves (ENG) (women); Bradley van der Velden (NED) (boys); Aurora Fochesato (ITA) (girls)

The 2023 WDF World Darts Championship (known for sponsorship reasons as the 2023 CT1 Lakeside World Darts Championship for sponsorship reasons) was the second edition of the WDF World Darts Championship organised by the World Darts Federation (WDF). The tournament was held at the Lakeside Country Club in Frimley Green, Surrey, England.

Neil Duff and Beau Greaves were defending the senior titles. Duff lost 3–4 to Chris Landman in the quarter-finals, and Greaves retained her title, defeating Aileen de Graaf 4–1 in the final, losing just one set throughout the tournament.

Andy Baetens became the first Belgian darts player to win the men's tournament, as he defeated Chris Landman 6–1 in the final.

== Prize money ==
Position	Prize money			
Position	Men	Women	Boys	Girls
Winner	£50,000	£25,000	£5,000	£2,000
Runner-up	£20,000	£10,000	£2,000	£1,000
Semi-finalist	£10,000	£5,000	£1,000	—
Quarter-finalist	£5,000	£2,500	—	—
Last 16	£2,500	£1,500	—	—
Last 24	—	£1,000	—	—
Last 32	£1,500	—	—	—
Last 48	£1,000	—	—	—
Event Totals	£170,000	£75,000	£9,000	£3,000
Overall Total	£257,000			

== Schedule ==
Saturday, 2 December

Game #	Round	Player 1	Score	Player 2	Set 1	Set 2	Set 3
01	1	Scott Marsh 71.11	0–2	Sebastian Białecki 85.42	0–3	1–3	—
02	1	Jo Clements 58.08	0–2	Veronika Ihász 64.20	2–3	1–3	—
03	1	Aaron Turner 73.78	1–2	Ricky Nauman 74.75	1–3	3–1	1–3
04	1	Jordan Brooks 69.85	0–2	Dennis Nilsson 75.02	1–3	1–3	—
05	1	Paula Murphy 73.04	2–1	Almudena Fajardo 72.73	3–2	1–3	3–1
06	1	Dave Prins 73.29	0–2	Reece Colley 83.69	0–3	1–3	—
07	1	James Richardson 88.14	2–1	Christian Gödl 80.54	3–1	2–3	3–1
08	1	Aletta Wajer 61.70	2–0	Paula Jacklin 60.82	3–2	3–0	—
09	1	Patrik Kovács 82.03	1–2	Jim Widmayer 82.26	2–3	3–2	1–3
10	1	Jonny Tata 76.47	2–1	Shaun McDonald 84.90	3–2	1–3	3–2
11	1	Lorraine Hyde 69.28	2–1	Laura Turner 71.57	1–3	3–1	3–1
12	1	Danny Porter 76.19	0–2	Arjan Konterman 84.07	1–3	0–3	—

Sunday, 3 December

Game #	Round	Player 1	Score	Player 2	Set 1	Set 2	Set 3
13	1	Liam Maendl-Lawrance 75.33	2–1	Mike Gillet 72.02	2–3	3–2	3–1
14	1	Kirsty Hutchinson 71.24	2–0	Mayumi Ouchi 68.18	3–0	3–2	—
15	1	László Kádár 79.25	0–2	Edwin Torbjörnsson 85.60	0–3	2–3	—
16	1	Moreno Blom 78.09	2–0	Gábor Takács 72.09	3–2	3–1	—
17	1	Kym Mitchell 66.57	1–2	Priscilla Steenbergen 66.32	1–3	3–2	2–3
18	1	Jamie Lewis 82.96	0–2	Jarno Bottenberg 91.72	0–3	1–3	—
19	1	Suzanne Smith 58.33	2–0	Victoria Monaghan 54.71	3–2	3–2	—
20	1	Benjamin Pratnemer 79.58	0–2	Davie Kirwan 83.09	1–3	2–3	—
21	1	Leonard Gates 92.11	2–0	Brian Corbett 83.24	3–2	3–0	—
22	1	Nicole Regnaud 68.33	2–1	Anna Forsmark 65.17	1–3	3–0	3–1
23	1	Antony Allen 78.99	0–2	Dennie Olde Kalter 86.02	2–3	1–3	—
24	1	Thomas Junghans 82.63	2–0	David Pallett 71.04	3–2	3–0	—

Monday, 4 December

Game #	Round	Player 1	Score	Player 2	Set 1	Set 2	Set 3	Set 4	Set 5
25	2	Peter Machin 83.40	0–3	James Richardson 85.80	2–3	0–3	0–3	—	—
26	2	Anca Zijlstra 62.43	0–2	Paula Murphy 61.95	1–3	2–3	—	—	—
27	2	Mark Barilli 69.88	0–3	Jim Widmayer 75.39	0–3	0–3	2–3	—	—
28	2	Gary Stone 91.11	3–1	Ricky Nauman 77.52	0–3	3–0	3–0	3–1	—
29	2	Barry Copeland 83.56	2–3	Jonny Tata 83.86	1–3	2–3	3–2	3–1	1–3
30	2	Beau Greaves 88.79	2–0	Lorraine Hyde 77.76	3–1	3–0	—	—	—
31	2	Andy Baetens 94.82	3–0	Sebastian Białecki 89.88	3–2	3–1	3–2	—	—
32	2	James Hurrell 81.46	2–3	Dennis Nilsson 79.89	1–3	3–2	1–3	3–1	2–3

Tuesday, 5 December

Game #	Round	Player 1	Score	Player 2	Set 1	Set 2	Set 3	Set 4	Set 5
33	2	Alexander Merkx 82.09	3–1	Arjan Konterman 79.12	0–3	3–2	3–0	3–2	—
34	2	Rhian O'Sullivan 85.08	2–0	Suzanne Smith 61.09	3–0	3–0	—	—	—
35	2	Martyn Turner 87.78	3–1	Liam Maendl-Lawrance 83.40	3–2	3–0	1–3	3–1	—
36	2	Wesley Plaisier 88.86	3–1	Reece Colley 87.14	3–1	0–3	3–0	3–1	—
37	2	Jelle Klaasen 93.91	3–0	Edwin Torbjörnsson 86.67	3–0	3–1	3–0	—	—
38	2	Deta Hedman 71.13	2–1	Aletta Wajer 69.09	3–1	2–3	3–1	—	—
39	2	Neil Duff 84.83	3–1	Moreno Blom 83.41	3–0	2–3	3–2	3–2	—
40	2	John Scott 83.44	0–3	Leonard Gates 88.31	2–3	1–3	2–3	—	—

Wednesday, 6 December

Game #	Round	Player 1	Score	Player 2	Set 1	Set 2	Set 3	Set 4	Set 5
41	2	Chris Landman 83.99	3–0	Davie Kirwan 79.10	3–0	3–2	3–2	—	—
42	2	Lorraine Winstanley 68.32	2–0	Veronika Ihász 60.82	3–0	3–0	—	—	—
43	2	Kai Fan Leung 81.60	1–3	Thomas Junghans 87.83	3–2	1–3	2–3	1–3	—
44	2	Darren Johnson 80.40	1–3	Dennie Olde Kalter 87.20	0–3	1–3	3–0	0–3	—
45	2	Danny Lauby 91.20	3–0	Jarno Bottenberg 86.21	3–1	3–0	3–0	—	—
46	2	Aileen de Graaf 77.52	2–1	Nicole Regnaud 81.10	3–2	1–3	3–2	—	—
47	3	Andy Baetens 94.20	3–1	Gary Stone 94.49	3–0	2–3	3–1	3–2	—
48	3	Wesley Plaisier 90.36	3–0	James Richardson 80.69	3–1	3–1	3–2	—	—

Thursday, 7 December

Game #	Round	Player 1	Score	Player 2	Set 1	Set 2	Set 3	Set 4	Set 5
49	3	Jonny Tata 80.80	3–0	Jim Widmayer 78.58	3–1	3–2	3–2	—	—
50	2	Wendy Harper 62.98	0–2	Kirsty Hutchinson 74.53	0–3	0–3	—	—	—
51	3	Dennis Nilsson 90.37	3–1	Alexander Merkx 87.45	3–2	1–3	3–2	3–1	—
52	3	Chris Landman 87.65	3–2	Thomas Junghans 82.08	1–3	3–1	3–1	2–3	3–1
53	3	Jelle Klaasen 93.29	3–2	Dennie Olde Kalter 84.22	1–3	3–1	1–3	3–0	3–2
54	2	Lisa Ashton 75.36	2–1	Priscilla Steenbergen 71.07	0–3	3–1	3–0	—	—
55	3	Neil Duff 87.98	3–2	Martyn Turner 81.55	2–3	3–2	2–3	3–1	3–1
56	3	Danny Lauby 87.20	3–0	Leonard Gates 83.47	3–1	3–0	3–1	—	—

Friday, 8 December

Game #	Round	Player 1	Score	Player 2	Set 1	Set 2	Set 3	Set 4	Set 5	Set 6	Set 7
57	QF	Deta Hedman 75.14	0–2	Rhian O'Sullivan 80.43	0–3	2–3	—	—	—	—	—
58	QF	Dennis Nilsson 97.44	4–1	Wesley Plaisier 96.00	3–2	3–2	0–3	3–2	3–2	—	—
59	QF	Aileen de Graaf 76.20	2–0	Lorraine Winstanley 69.47	3–2	3–0	—	—	—	—	—
60	QF	Andy Baetens 93.27	4–2	Jonny Tata 91.64	3–2	3–2	3–2	2–3	2–3	3–0	—
61	QF	Beau Greaves 88.41	2–0	Paula Murphy 63.26	3–0	3–0	—	—	—	—	—
62	QF	Neil Duff 84.55	3–4	Chris Landman 85.78	2–3	3–2	2–3	3–1	3–1	2–3	2–3
63	QF	Lisa Ashton 68.22	2–1	Kirsty Hutchinson 68.16	0–3	3–2	3–1	—	—	—	—
64	QF	Jelle Klaasen 90.44	4–1	Danny Lauby 86.27	3–2	3–0	2–3	3–1	3–0	—	—

Saturday, 9 December

Game #	Round	Player 1	Score	Player 2	Set 1	Set 2	Set 3	Set 4	Set 5	Set 6	Set 7	Set 8	Set 9
65	SF	Mats Theobald 67.07	0–2	Bradley van der Velden 74.55	2–3	1–3	—	—	—	—	—	—	—
66	SF	Aileen de Graaf 77.04	3–1	Lisa Ashton 74.17	3–1	1–3	3–2	3–0	—	—	—	—	—
67	SF	Andy Baetens 94.13	5–2	Dennis Nilsson 86.42	2–3	3–0	2–3	3–0	3–0	3–1	3–2	—	—
68	SF	András Borbély 74.19	1–2	Adam Dee 74.91	3–1	2–3	1–3	—	—	—	—	—	—
69	SF	Beau Greaves 90.77	3–0	Rhian O'Sullivan 79.29	3–1	3–0	3–0	—	—	—	—	—	—
70	SF	Chris Landman 89.22	5–3	Jelle Klaasen 87.92	3–1	0–3	1–3	1–3	3–1	3–2	3–1	3–1	—

Sunday, 10 December

Game #	Round	Player 1	Score	Player 2	Set 1	Set 2	Set 3	Set 4	Set 5	Set 6	Set 7	Set 8	Set 9	Set 10	Set 11
71	F	Krisztina Turai 51.07	0–2	Aurora Fochesato 59.43	0–3	2–3	—	—	—	—	—	—	—	—	—
72	F	Adam Dee 66.68	0–3	Bradley van der Velden 69.93	0–3	2–3	0–3	—	—	—	—	—	—	—	—
73	F	Beau Greaves 84.64	4–1	Aileen de Graaf 77.69	3–1	3–0	3–2	1–3	3–0	—	—	—	—	—	—
74	F	Andy Baetens 93.69	6–1	Chris Landman 86.47	3–0	3–0	3–2	1–3	3–1	3–1	3–0	—	—	—	—

== Men's ==
=== Format and qualifiers ===
Qualifying criteria were as follows.

1. Top 16 players in WDF World Rankings (seeded)
2. Winners of the 12 Platinum/Gold ranked tournaments
3. First and second ranked players from each of seven regional tables
4. Next highest ranked players in the WDF World Rankings to bring the total entry list to 44
5. Four qualifiers from the final qualification tournament in Assen, Netherlands on 12 December 2022

Seeded players began the competition in the second round. The remaining 32 qualifiers started in the first round. The list of seeds and invited players was as follows.

1–16 in WDF Rankings
Seeded in second round

1. Andy Baetens
2. Neil Duff

~~Haupai Puha~~ (Note: Decided to play at 2024 PDC World Darts Championship.)

3. Jelle Klaasen
4. James Hurrell

~~Luke Littler~~

5. Wesley Plaisier

~~Ben Robb~~

6. Danny Lauby
7. Chris Landman
8. Barry Copeland
9. Mark Barilli
10. Kai Fan Leung
11. ~~Thibault Tricole~~

John Scott (Note: Starts from second round as a late replacement for Tricole per WDF rules.)

12. Peter Machin
13. Alexander Merkx

~~Raymond Smith~~ (Note: Withdrew for medical reasons.)

14. Darren Johnson
15. Martyn Turner
16. Gary Stone

Ranked Tournaments Winners
First round

- Sebastian Białecki – 2022 Denmark Open
- Reece Colley – 2022 British Open

~~Robert Owen~~ (Note: Ineligible as 2023 PDC Tour Card holders.) - 2022 England Classic

- Dave Prins – 2022 Isle of Man Open
Pre-qualified
- Jelle Klaasen – 2022 Dutch Open, 2022 Irish Open
- Neil Duff – 2022 World Championship
- James Hurrell – 2022 Scottish Open

~~Luke Littler~~ - 2022 Welsh Open

- Wesley Plaisier – 2022 World Masters
- ~~Ben Robb~~ – 2022 New Zealand Open
- ~~Raymond Smith~~ – 2022 Australian Open

Regional Table Qualifiers
First round

- ~~Aaron Morrison~~ (Note: Withdrew for personal reasons.) – Australia
- Brian Corbett – New Zealand
- Ricky Nauman – North Europe
- Dennis Nilsson – North Europe
- László Kádár – Eastern Europe
- Patrik Kovács – Eastern Europe
- Jim Widmayer – USA
Pre-qualified
- Peter Machin – Australia
- ~~Haupai Puha~~ – New Zealand
- ~~Ben Robb~~ – New Zealand
- James Hurrell – UK & Ireland

~~Luke Littler~~ – UK & Ireland

- Danny Lauby – USA
- Andy Baetens – West Europe
- Alexander Merkx – West Europe

WDF Rankings Qualifiers
First round

- Jonny Tata
- Moreno Blom
- Antony Allen
- Benjamin Pratnemer
- James Richardson
- Jamie Lewis
- Scott Marsh
- Dennie Olde Kalter
- Mike Gillet
- Davie Kirwan
- Gábor Takács
- David Pallett

~~Nick Kenny~~
~~Richard Veenstra~~

Assen Qualifiers
First round

- Jarno Bottenberg
- Christian Gödl
- Arjan Konterman
- Shaun McDonald

Reserves
First round

- (Germany) Liam Maendl-Lawrance
- Danny Porter
- Leonard Gates
- ~~Berry van Peer~~
- Thomas Junghans
- Jordan Brooks
- Aaron Turner
- ~~Brandon Weening~~
- ~~Ky Smith~~
- Edwin Torbjörnsson

=== Draw ===
==== Finals ====
Quarter-finals (best of 7 sets); 8 December
1	Andy Baetens 93.27	4
Jonny Tata 91.64	2
Dennis Nilsson 97.44	4
5	Wesley Plaisier 96.00	1
2	Neil Duff 84.55	3
7	Chris Landman 85.78	4
3	Jelle Klaasen 90.44	4
6	Danny Lauby 86.27	1

Semi-finals (best of 9 sets); 9 December
1	Andy Baetens 94.13	5
Dennis Nilsson 86.42	2
7	Chris Landman 89.22	5
3	Jelle Klaasen 87.92	3

Final (best of 11 sets); 10 December
1	Andy Baetens 93.69	6
7	Chris Landman 86.47	1

==== Rounds 1–4 ====
First round (best of 3 sets); 2–3 December
Scott Marsh 71.11	0
Sebastian Białecki 85.42	2
Aaron Turner 73.78	1
Ricky Nauman 74.75	2
Jonny Tata 76.47	2
Shaun McDonald 84.90	1
Patrik Kovács 82.03	1
Jim Widmayer 82.26	2
Jordan Brooks 69.85	0
Dennis Nilsson 75.02	2
Danny Porter 76.19	0
Arjan Konterman 84.07	2
Dave Prins 73.29	0
Reece Colley 83.69	2
James Richardson 88.14	2
Christian Gödl 80.54	1
Moreno Blom 78.09	2
Gábor Takács 72.09	0
Liam Maendl-Lawrance 75.33	2
Mike Gillet 72.02	1
Benjamin Pratnemer 79.58	0
Davie Kirwan 83.09	2
Thomas Junghans 82.63	2
David Pallett 71.04	0
László Kádár 79.25	0
Edwin Torbjörnsson 85.60	2
Antony Allen 78.99	0
Dennie Olde Kalter 86.02	2
Jamie Lewis 82.96	0
Jarno Bottenberg 91.72	2
Leonard Gates 92.11	2
Brian Corbett 83.24	0

Second round (best of 5 sets); 4–6 December
1	Andy Baetens 94.82	3
Sebastian Białecki 89.88	0
16	Gary Stone 91.11	3
Ricky Nauman 77.52	1
8	Barry Copeland 83.56	2
Jonny Tata 83.86	3
9	Mark Barilli 69.88	0
Jim Widmayer 75.39	3
4	James Hurrell 81.46	2
Dennis Nilsson 79.89	3
13	Alexander Merkx 82.09	3
Arjan Konterman 79.12	1
5	Wesley Plaisier 88.86	3
Reece Colley 87.14	1
12	Peter Machin 83.40	0
James Richardson 85.80	3
2	Neil Duff 84.83	3
Moreno Blom 83.41	1
15	Martyn Turner 87.78	3
Liam Maendl-Lawrance 83.40	1
7	Chris Landman 83.99	3
Davie Kirwan 79.10	0
10	Kai Fan Leung 81.60	1
Thomas Junghans 87.83	3
3	Jelle Klaasen 93.91	3
Edwin Torbjörnsson 86.67	0
14	Darren Johnson 80.40	1
Dennie Olde Kalter 87.20	3
6	Danny Lauby 91.20	3
Jarno Bottenberg 86.21	0
Alt	John Scott 83.44	0
Leonard Gates 88.31	3

Third round (best of 5 sets); 6–7 December
1	Andy Baetens 94.20	3
16	Gary Stone 94.49	1
Jonny Tata 80.80	3
Jim Widmayer 78.58	0
Dennis Nilsson 90.37	3
13	Alexander Merkx 87.45	1
5	Wesley Plaisier 90.36	3
James Richardson 80.69	0
2	Neil Duff 87.98	3
15	Martyn Turner 81.55	2
7	Chris Landman 87.65	3
Thomas Junghans 82.08	2
3	Jelle Klaasen 93.29	3
Dennie Olde Kalter 84.22	2
6	Danny Lauby 87.20	3
Leonard Gates 83.47	0

Quarter-finals (best of 7 sets); 8 December
1	Andy Baetens 93.27	4
Jonny Tata 91.64	2
Dennis Nilsson 97.44	4
5	Wesley Plaisier 96.00	1
2	Neil Duff 84.55	3
7	Chris Landman 85.78	4
3	Jelle Klaasen 90.44	4
6	Danny Lauby 86.27	1

== Women's ==
=== Format and qualifiers ===
Qualifying criteria was as follows.

1. Top 8 players in WDF World Rankings (seeded)
2. Winners of the 12 Platinum/Gold ranked tournaments
3. First and second ranked players from each of seven regional tables
4. Next highest ranked players in the WDF World Rankings to bring the total entry list to 22
5. Two qualifiers from the final qualification tournament in Assen, Netherlands on 12 December 2022

Seeded players began the competition in the second round. The remaining 16 qualifiers started in the first round. The list of seeds and invited players was as follows.

1–8 in WDF Rankings
Seeded in Second round

1. Beau Greaves
2. Aileen de Graaf
3. Lisa Ashton
4. Deta Hedman
5. Rhian O'Sullivan
6. Wendy Harper
7. Lorraine Winstanley
8. Anca Zijlstra

Ranking Tournaments Winners
First round

- Victoria Monaghan – 2022 New Zealand Open
Pre-qualified
- Beau Greaves – 2022 World Championship, 2022 Dutch Open, 2022 Isle of Man Open, 2022 Welsh Open, 2022 Australian Open, 2022 England Classic, 2022 Irish Open, 2022 World Masters
- Deta Hedman – 2022 Scottish Open, 2022 Denmark Open
- Lisa Ashton – 2022 British Open

Regional Table Qualifiers
First round

- Anna Forsmark – North Europe
- Veronika Ihász – Eastern Europe
- Kym Mitchell – Australia
- Paula Murphy – USA
- Aletta Wajer – Western Europe
Pre-qualified
- Beau Greaves – UK & Ireland
- Wendy Harper – New Zealand

WDF Rankings Qualifiers
First round

- Kirsty Hutchinson
- Nicole Regnaud
- Suzanne Smith
- Lorraine Hyde
- Jo Clements
- Paula Jacklin
- Priscilla Steenbergen
- Laura Turner

Assen Qualifiers
First round

- Almudena Fajardo
- Mayumi Ouchi

=== Draw ===
First round (best of 3 sets); 2–3 December
Lorraine Hyde 84.05	2
Laura Turner 83.88	1
Paula Murphy 73.04	2
Almudena Fajardo 72.73	1
Aletta Wajer 61.70	2
Paula Jacklin 60.82	0
Suzanne Smith 58.33	2
Victoria Monaghan 54.71	0
Nicole Regnaud 68.33	2
Anna Forsmark 65.17	1
Jo Clements 58.08	0
Veronika Ihász 64.20	2
Kym Mitchell 66.57	1
Priscilla Steenbergen 66.32	2
Kirsty Hutchinson 71.24	2
Mayumi Ouchi 68.18	0

Second round (best of 3 sets); 4–7 December
1	Beau Greaves 88.79	2
Lorraine Hyde 77.76	0
8	Anca Zijlstra 62.43	0
Paula Murphy 61.95	2
4	Deta Hedman 71.13	2
Aletta Wajer 69.09	1
5	Rhian O'Sullivan 85.08	2
Suzanne Smith 61.09	0
2	Aileen de Graaf 77.52	2
Nicole Regnaud 81.10	1
7	Lorraine Winstanley 68.32	2
Veronika Ihász 60.82	0
3	Lisa Ashton 75.36	2
Priscilla Steenbergen 71.07	1
6	Wendy Harper 62.98	0
Kirsty Hutchinson 74.53	2

Quarter-finals (best of 3 sets); 8 December
1	Beau Greaves 88.41	2
Paula Murphy 63.26	0
4	Deta Hedman 75.14	0
5	Rhian O'Sullivan 80.43	2
2	Aileen de Graaf 76.20	2
7	Lorraine Winstanley 69.47	0
3	Lisa Ashton 68.22	2
Kirsty Hutchinson 68.16	1

Semi-finals (best of 5 sets); 9 December
1	Beau Greaves 90.77	3
5	Rhian O'Sullivan 79.29	0
2	Aileen de Graaf 77.04	3
3	Lisa Ashton 74.17	1

Final (best of 7 sets); 10 December
1	Beau Greaves 84.64	4
2	Aileen de Graaf 77.69	1

== Boys' ==
=== Format and qualifiers ===
All boys under the age of 18 were eligible to play in the 2023 Lakeside WDF Boys World Championship tournament. The semi-finals and final of the tournament were played at the Lakeside Country Club, Frimley Green as part of the 2023 WDF World Darts Championships tournament. The list of qualified players was as follows.

1. András Borbély

~~Luke Littler~~ (Note: Decided to play at 2024 PDC World Darts Championship after PDC didn't permit to play at two World Championships in one year.)

2. Mats Theobald
3. Adam Dee
4. Bradley van der Velden

=== Draw ===
Semi-finals (best of 3 sets); 9 December
András Borbély 74.19	1
Adam Dee 74.91	2
Mats Theobald 67.07	0
Bradley van der Velden 74.55	2

Final (best of 5 sets); 10 December
Adam Dee 66.68	0
Bradley van der Velden 69.93	3

== Girls' ==
=== Format and qualifiers ===
All girls that were under the age of 18 were eligible to play in the 2023 Lakeside WDF Girls World Championship tournament. The final of the tournament was played at the Lakeside Country Club, Frimley Green as part of the 2023 WDF World Darts Championships tournament. The list of qualified players was as follows.

1. Krisztina Turai
2. Aurora Fochesato

=== Draw ===
Final (best of 3 sets); 10 December
Krisztina Turai 51.07	0
Aurora Fochesato 59.43	2

== Statistics ==
=== Top averages ===
This table shows the highest averages achieved by players throughout the tournament.

==== Men's ====
#	Player	Round	Average	Result	Score
1	Dennis Nilsson	QF	97.44	Won	4–1
2	Wesley Plaisier	QF	96.00	Lost	1–4
3	Andy Baetens	R2	94.82	Won	3–1
4	Gary Stone	R3	94.49	Lost	1–3
5	Andy Baetens (2)	R3	94.20	Won	3–1
6	Andy Baetens (3)	SF	94.13	Won	5–2
7	Jelle Klaasen	R2	93.91	Won	3–0
8	Andy Baetens (4)	F	93.69	Won	6–1
9	Jelle Klaasen (2)	R3	93.29	Won	3–2
10	Andy Baetens (5)	QF	93.27	Won	4–2

==== Women's ====
#	Player	Round	Average	Result	Score
1	Beau Greaves	SF	90.77	Won	3–0
2	Beau Greaves (2)	R2	88.79	Won	2–0
3	Beau Greaves (3)	QF	88.41	Won	2–0
4	Rhian O'Sullivan	R2	85.08	Won	2–0
5	Beau Greaves (4)	F	84.64	Won	4–1
6	Nicole Regnaud	R2	81.10	Lost	1–2
