= Radek Szagański =

Polish-Irish darts player (born 1979)

Personal information
- Full name: Radosław Szagański
- Born: 17 October 1979 (age 47) Poznań, Poland
- Home town: Cork, Ireland

Sport
- Sport: Darts
- Playing since: 2007
- Darts: 23g MasterDarts
- Laterality: Right-handed
- Walk-on music: "Whiskey in the Jar" by Metallica

Organisation (see split in darts)
- BDO: 2010–2013
- PDC: 2014– (Tour Card 2022–2025)
- WDF: 2010–2013
- Current world ranking: (PDC) NR (18 October 2026)

WDF major events – best performances
- World Masters: Last 24: 2011

PDC premier events – best performances
- World Championship: Last 64: 2024
- UK Open: Last 64: 2025
- PC Finals: Last 32: 2023

Other tournament wins
- Years
| Poznań Open | 2011 |
| Polish Championship | 2013 |
| Series 13 - WEEK 3 | 2026 |
Players Championships
| 2023 Players Championship 27 |

Radosław Szagański (born 17 October 1979) is a Polish-Irish professional darts player who competes in Professional Darts Corporation (PDC) events. A PDC Tour Card holder between 2022 and 2025, he won his first PDC ranking title at Players Championship 27 on the 2023 PDC Pro Tour.

He formerly competed in British Darts Organisation (BDO) and World Darts Federation (WDF) events, winning the 2011 Poznań Open.

== Career ==
Szagański appeared independently from 2008 at various events, primarily in Poland and Republic of Ireland where he lives. He reached semi-finals of the Limerick Classic. His first attempt to qualify for the BDO World Darts Championship in 2010 was not crowned with success. In October 2010, he qualified for the 2010 Winmau World Masters, when he won the first round match 3–1 in sets against Chris Scutt. In the second round he lost 1–3 in sets to Andy Boulton.

In August 2011, he played at the Poznań Open which his first and only international trophy of World Darts Federation. In the final he defeat Oto Zmelík. Good form influenced the results in the 2011 Winmau World Masters. On the first day of the competition, he defeated Loris Polese, Craig Robertson, Lee Whitworth and Jim Withers. In the fifth round he lost to Christian Kist 1–3 in sets. In the following years, Szagański's results at the World Masters differed from previous years. In the 2012 Winmau World Masters he lost to Harry Todman in his first match. In the 2013 Winmau World Masters he beat Cor Dekker in preliminary round, but lost to Gary Harding in the first round.

In 2013, Szagański became the Polish Champion, defeating Tomasz Mikołajczyk in the final. In 2014, he was able to reach the quarter-finals of the Police Masters.

Szagański attempted to qualify for the 2015 PDC World Darts Championship. He reached the final of the Irish Tom Kirby Memorial, a win in the tournament would have earned him a spot in the preliminary round of the PDC World Darts Championship. Unfortunately for him, he lost the match 2–6 in legs to Daryl Gurney. He was just as close to qualifying in 2016, when he lost 5–6 in legs to Mick McGowan.

=== 2022 ===
After a few years of break in activity at the international level, Szagański successfully gained a two-year PDC Tour Card at 2022 European Q-School by finishing sixth on the European Q-School Order of Merit. In his debut on PDC European Tour stage in April at the 2022 Austrian Darts Open, he lost to Danny Jansen 6–1 in the first round. A month later he played at the 2022 European Darts Grand Prix, he lost 1–6 to Mickey Mansell in the first round. In June, he was close to his first victory in a PDC European Tour tournament at the 2022 European Darts Matchplay, but he lost 6–5 to Scott Williams in the first round.

=== 2023 ===
In 2023 Szagański won Players Championship 27, winning matches against Dimitri van den Bergh and Jonny Clayton before beating Connor Scutt 8–5 in the final.

=== 2024 ===
At the World Championship, Szagański won his first-round match 3–2 in sets against Marko Kantele. He was defeated in the second round by Raymond van Barneveld 3–1.

At European Q-School, Szagański regained his PDC Tour Card by finishing third on the European Q-School Order of Merit.

In February, on the 2024 PDC Pro Tour, Szagański achieved a surprise 6–5 victory over Luke Littler in the second round of Players Championship 2. He was defeated by Ryan Joyce 6–2 in the third round.

== Personal life ==
Szagański works as a bus driver for Bus Éireann in Cork. He lives in Cobh.

== World Championship results ==
=== PDC ===
- 2024: Second round (lost to Raymond van Barneveld 1–3)

== Performance timeline ==
BDO

| Tournament | 2010 | 2011 | 2012 | 2013 |
|---|---|---|---|---|
| World Masters | 2R | 5R | 1R | 1R |

PDC

| Tournament | 2022 | 2023 | 2024 | 2025 |
|---|---|---|---|---|
PDC Ranked televised events
| World Championship | DNQ | | 2R | DNQ |
| World Masters | DNQ | | | Prel. |
| UK Open | 2R | 3R | 1R | 4R |
| Players Championship Finals | DNQ | 2R | DNQ | |
PDC Non-ranked televised events
| World Cup | DNQ | | 2R | RR |
| Season-end ranking (PDC) | 114 | 68 | 101 | 99 |

PDC European Tour

| Season | 1 | 2 | 3 | 4 | 5 | 6 | 7 | 8 | 9 | 10 | 11 | 12 | 13 | 14 |
|---|---|---|---|---|---|---|---|---|---|---|---|---|---|---|
| 2022 | DNQ | | | ADO; 1R | DNQ | | EDG; 1R | DDC; DNQ | EDM; 1R | Did not qualify | | | | |
| 2024 | Did not qualify | | | | | | | EDO; 1R | Did not qualify | | | | | |
| 2025 | DNQ | | IDO; 1R | Did not qualify | | | | | | | | | | |

PDC Players Championships

| Season | 1 | 2 | 3 | 4 | 5 | 6 | 7 | 8 | 9 | 10 | 11 | 12 | 13 | 14 | 15 | 16 | 17 | 18 | 19 | 20 | 21 | 22 | 23 | 24 | 25 | 26 | 27 | 28 | 29 | 30 | 31 | 32 | 33 | 34 |
|---|---|---|---|---|---|---|---|---|---|---|---|---|---|---|---|---|---|---|---|---|---|---|---|---|---|---|---|---|---|---|---|---|---|---|
| 2022 | BAR; 2R | BAR; 1R | WIG; 2R | WIG; 3R | BAR; 1R | BAR; 1R | NIE; 1R | NIE; 1R | BAR; 1R | BAR; 1R | BAR; 2R | BAR; 2R | BAR; 3R | WIG; 2R | WIG; 1R | NIE; 1R | NIE; 3R | BAR; 1R | BAR; 1R | BAR; 3R | BAR; 1R | BAR; 1R | BAR; 2R | BAR; 2R | BAR; 1R | BAR; 3R | BAR; 1R | BAR; 2R | BAR; 1R | BAR; 3R | | | | |
| 2023 | BAR; 1R | BAR; 1R | BAR; 2R | BAR; 1R | BAR; 4R | BAR; 2R | HIL; 1R | HIL; 1R | WIG; 1R | WIG; 2R | LEI; SF | LEI; 2R | HIL; 3R | HIL; 2R | LEI; QF | LEI; 1R | HIL; 1R | HIL; 2R | BAR; 2R | BAR; 1R | BAR; 1R | BAR; 1R | BAR; 1R | BAR; 1R | BAR; 1R | BAR; 2R | BAR; W | BAR; 4R | BAR; QF | BAR; 3R | | | | |
| 2024 | WIG; 1R | WIG; 3R | LEI; 1R | LEI; 1R | HIL; DNP | | LEI; 1R | LEI; SF | HIL; 1R | HIL; 1R | HIL; 1R | HIL; 2R | MIL; 4R | MIL; 1R | MIL; 2R | MIL; 2R | MIL; 1R | MIL; DNP | | WIG; 1R | WIG; 1R | LEI; 2R | LEI; 3R | WIG; 1R | WIG; 1R | WIG; 4R | WIG; 1R | WIG; 3R | LEI; 2R | LEI; 2R | | | | |
| 2025 | WIG; 1R | WIG; 2R | ROS; 1R | ROS; 2R | LEI; 1R | LEI; 1R | HIL; 1R | HIL; 1R | LEI; 2R | LEI; 1R | LEI; 1R | LEI; 1R | ROS; 1R | ROS; 1R | HIL; 1R | HIL; 2R | LEI; 2R | LEI; 1R | LEI; 1R | LEI; 1R | LEI; 1R | HIL; 1R | HIL; 1R | MIL; 1R | MIL; 1R | HIL; 1R | HIL; 2R | LEI; 2R | LEI; 2R | LEI; 2R | WIG; 3R | WIG; 1R | WIG; 1R | WIG; 1R |

Performance Table Legend
| W | Won the tournament | F | Finalist | SF | Semifinalist | QF | Quarterfinalist | #R; RR; Prel. | Lost in # round Round-robin; Preliminary round | DQ | Disqualified |
| DNQ | Did not qualify | DNP | Did not participate | WD | Withdrew | NH | Tournament not held | #R; RR; Prel. | Lost in # round Round-robin; Preliminary round | NYF | Not yet founded |
