= Christian Gödl =

Austrian darts player

Personal information
- Nickname: "Black Panther"
- Born: 17 March 1980 (age 46) Völkermarkt, Austria
- Home town: Villach, Austria

Sport
- Sport: Darts
- Playing since: 2008
- Laterality: Right-handed
- Walk-on music: "Child's Anthem" by Toto

Organisation (see split in darts)
- PDC: 2008–2021
- WDF: 2022–
- Current world ranking: (PDC) NR (18 October 2026)

WDF major events – best performances
- World Championship: Last 48: 2023
- World Masters: Last 16: 2022

Christian Gödl (born 17 March 1980) is an Austrian professional darts player who plays in World Darts Federation (WDF) events. In the past, he played in Professional Darts Corporation (PDC) tournaments, representing Austria twice on the PDC European Tour.

== Career ==
In 2018, he tried the European Q-School in Hildesheim, but was unable to get a PDC Tour Card. He made his PDC European Tour debut in the 2018 German Darts Grand Prix, but was whitewashed 6–0 by Stephen Bunting. At the beginning of January 2019 he went back to the Q-School in Hildesheim, where he made it to the final on the first day and only there had to admit defeat to Dutchman Niels Zonneveld. He tackled the PDC Challenge Tour in 2019, on which he made it to the quarterfinals twice. Gödl has also qualified for the 2019 Austrian Darts Championship, but he lost again. This time he was defeated by Jeffrey de Zwaan.

In November 2022, he showed up at the PDC East Europe Qualifier for the 2023 PDC World Darts Championship and he lost in the final game against Sebastian Białecki. Two weeks later, he played for the first time in the 2022 Winmau World Masters. He lost in the fifth round to eventual winner Wesley Plaisier. On 12 November, he won the qualification for the 2023 WDF World Darts Championship.

== World Championship results ==
=== WDF ===
- 2023: First round (lost to James Richardson 1–2)
