= 2022 European Darts Matchplay =

2022 edition of European Darts Matchplay

2022 Interwetten European Darts Matchplay

Tournament information
- Dates: 1–3 July 2022
- Venue: Trier Arena
- Location: Trier, Germany
- Organisation(s): Professional Darts Corporation (PDC)
- Format: Legs
- Prize fund: £140,000
- Winner's share: £25,000
- High checkout: 170 Lukas Wenig

Champion(s)
- Luke Humphries (ENG)

The 2022 Interwetten European Darts Matchplay was the ninth of thirteen PDC European Tour events on the 2022 PDC Pro Tour. The tournament took place at the Trier Arena, Trier, Germany, from 1 to 3 July 2022. It featured a field of 48 players and £140,000 in prize money, with £25,000 going to the winner.

Joe Cullen was the defending champion after defeating Michael van Gerwen 8–5 in the 2019 final, but he lost to Ian White in the second round.

Luke Humphries won his fourth European Tour title of 2022, beating first-time finalist Rowby-John Rodriguez 8–7 in the final. It was also the third consecutive European Tour event that he attended that he won the title, as he withdrew from the Dutch Darts Championship.

== Prize money ==
The prize money was unchanged from the European Tours of the last 3 years:

Stage (num. of players)		Prize money
Winner	(1)	£25,000
Runner-up	(1)	£10,000
Semi-finalists	(2)	£6,500
Quarter-finalists	(4)	£5,000
Third round losers	(8)	£3,000
Second round losers	(16)	£2,000*
First round losers	(16)	£1,000*
Total	£140,000	

- Seeded players who lose in the second round and host nation qualifiers (who qualify automatically as a result of their ranking) who lose in their first match of the event shall not be credited with prize money on any Order of Merit. A player who qualifies as a qualifier, but later becomes a seed due to the withdrawal of one or more other players shall be credited with their prize money on all Orders of Merit regardless of how far they progress in the event.

== Qualification and format ==
The top 16 entrants from the PDC ProTour Order of Merit on 30 April automatically qualified for the event and were seeded in the second round.

The remaining 32 places went to players from six qualifying events – 24 from the Tour Card Holder Qualifier (held on 9 May), two from the Associate Member Qualifier (held on 23 April), the two highest ProTour ranking German players, two from the Host Nation Qualifier (held on 23 April), one from the Nordic & Baltic Associate Member Qualifier (held on 20 February), and one from the East European Associate Member Qualifier (held on 24 April).

Michael van Gerwen, Peter Wright and Michael Smith, who were set to be the second, third and tenth seeds respectively, withdrew prior to the draw. Chris Dobey, Stephen Bunting and Daryl Gurney were promoted into seeded places, and three players were given first-round byes.

The following players took part in the tournament:

Top 16

1. Gerwyn Price (second round)
2. Ryan Searle (second round)
3. Luke Humphries (champion)
4. José de Sousa (second round)
5. Rob Cross (quarter-finals)
6. Joe Cullen (second round)
7. Damon Heta (quarter-finals)
8. Nathan Aspinall (quarter-finals)
9. Jonny Clayton (second round)
10. Dimitri Van den Bergh (third round)
11. Dirk van Duijvenbode (second round)
12. Krzysztof Ratajski (second round)
13. Martin Schindler (second round)
14. Chris Dobey (second round)
15. Stephen Bunting (semi-finals)
16. Daryl Gurney (second round)

Tour Card Qualifier
- Ian White (quarter-finals)
- Steve Lennon (first round)
- Jeffrey de Zwaan (third round)
- Danny Noppert (first round)
- Mervyn King (first round)
- Rowby-John Rodriguez (runner-up)
- Jermaine Wattimena (second round)
- Callan Rydz (second round)
- Joe Murnan (first round)
- Bradley Brooks (first round)
- Jamie Hughes (first round)
- Cameron Menzies (second round)
- Ross Montgomery (first round)
- Niels Zonneveld (first round)
- Radek Szagański (first round)
- Madars Razma (semi-finals)
- Luke Woodhouse (third round)
- Martin Lukeman (third round)
- James Wilson (second round)
- John Michael (first round)
- Jonathan Worsley (first round)

Associate Member Qualifier
- Scott Williams (third round)
- Wesley Plaisier (third round)

Highest Ranked Germans
- Gabriel Clemens (third round)
- Florian Hempel (second round)

Host Nation Qualifier
- Lukas Wenig (third round)
- Dragutin Horvat (first round)

Nordic & Baltic Qualifier
- Johan Engström (first round)

East European Qualifier
- Sebastian Białecki (second round)

== Draw ==
First round (best of 11 legs); 1 July
Danny Noppert 93.79	5
Rowby-John Rodriguez 93.67	6
Gabriel Clemens	bye
Ross Montgomery 78.84	1
Jermaine Wattimena 87.40	6
Radek Szagański 97.57	5
Scott Williams 96.88	6
Jamie Hughes 98.52	4
Wesley Plaisier 97.22	6
Madars Razma 92.15	6
Dragutin Horvat 85.02	3
Johan Engström 84.17	3
James Wilson 84.68	6
Luke Woodhouse	bye
Martin Lukeman 90.56	6
John Michael 87.27	4
Sebastian Białecki 87.84	6
Mervyn King 89.13	4
Callan Rydz 97.57	6
Jonathan Worsley 94.51	3
Florian Hempel 79.12	6
Bradley Brooks 80.30	2
Niels Zonneveld 95.54	3
Cameron Menzies 101.64	6
Lukas Wenig 89.01	6
Steve Lennon 91.39	4
Joe Murnan 87.90	1
Ian White 95.75	6
Jeffrey de Zwaan	bye

Second round (best of 11 legs); 2 July
1	Gerwyn Price 88.27	2
Rowby-John Rodriguez 96.75	6
16	Daryl Gurney 95.06	5
Gabriel Clemens 98.53	6
8	Nathan Aspinall 95.78	6
Jermaine Wattimena 93.62	2
9	Jonny Clayton 103.13	4
Scott Williams 96.07	6
4	José de Sousa 80.72	1
Wesley Plaisier 88.31	6
13	Martin Schindler 96.00	5
Madars Razma 95.46	6
5	Rob Cross 92.11	6
James Wilson 92.38	5
12	Krzysztof Ratajski 87.93	3
Luke Woodhouse 86.94	6
2	Ryan Searle 80.38	4
Martin Lukeman 89.75	6
15	Stephen Bunting 92.39	6
Sebastian Białecki 90.94	5
7	Damon Heta 91.53	6
Callan Rydz 94.05	4
10	Dimitri Van den Bergh 110.83	6
Florian Hempel 89.39	2
3	Luke Humphries 97.43	6
Cameron Menzies 100.15	4
14	Chris Dobey 100.18	4
Lukas Wenig 101.07	6
6	Joe Cullen 98.96	5
Ian White 100.56	6
11	Dirk van Duijvenbode 96.44	5
Jeffrey de Zwaan 98.37	6

Third round (best of 11 legs); 3 July
Rodriguez 95.69	6
Clemens 85.39	4
8	Aspinall 103.10	6
Williams 93.75	3
Plaisier 95.49	4
Razma 94.76	6
5	Cross 101.65	6
Woodhouse 89.84	3
Lukeman 92.18	5
15	Bunting 95.91	6
7	Heta 93.80	6
10	Van den Bergh 98.40	3
3	Humphries 96.98	6
Wenig 90.93	2
White 91.54	6
de Zwaan 89.78	3

Quarter-finals (best of 11 legs); 3 July
Rodriguez 92.20	6
8	Aspinall 86.93	2
Razma 87.81	6
5	Cross 94.13	4
15	Bunting 90.31	6
7	Heta 95.92	4
3	Humphries 100.99	6
White 97.89	1

Semi-finals (best of 13 legs); 3 July
Rodriguez 88.34	7
Razma 82.35	6
15	Bunting 84.16	0
3	Humphries 96.52	7

Final (best of 15 legs); 3 July
Rodriguez 91.22	7
3	Humphries 97.26	8
