= 2024 PDC Players Championship series =

2024 Darts tournament series

The 2024 PDC Players Championship series consisted of 30 darts tournaments on the 2024 PDC Pro Tour.

The Top 64 on the Players Championship Order of Merit qualified for the 2024 Players Championship Finals.

== Prize money ==
The 2024 prize money was significantly increased compared to the previous year.

This is how the prize money was divided:

Stage (no. of players)		Prize money (Total: £125,000)
Winner	(1)	£15,000
Runner-up	(1)	£10,000
Semi-finalists	(2)	£5,000
Quarter-finalists	(4)	£3,500
Fourth round	(8)	£2,500
Third round	(16)	£1,500
Second round	(32)	£1,000

== February ==
=== Players Championship 1 ===
Players Championship 1 was contested on Monday 12 February 2024. On their Pro Tour debuts, Luke Littler and Leighton Bennett hit nine-dart finishes, against Michele Turetta and Lukas Wenig respectively. Mickey Mansell also hit a nine-darter against Krzysztof Ratajski. The tournament was won by Luke Littler, who defeated Ryan Searle 8–7 in the final.

Quarter-finals (best of 11 legs)
Luke Littler 100.65	6
James Hurrell 91.52	3
Alan Soutar 93.95	6
Nick Kenny 90.40	5
18	Ryan Searle 93.10	6
26	José de Sousa 93.38	2
30	Brendan Dolan 95.62	5
22	Gian van Veen 97.20	6

Semi-finals (best of 13 legs)
Luke Littler 89.70	7
Alan Soutar 88.85	6
18	Ryan Searle 92.00	7
22	Gian van Veen 81.57	3

Final (best of 15 legs)
Luke Littler 109.64	8
18	Ryan Searle 111.71	7

=== Players Championship 2 ===
Players Championship 2 was contested on Tuesday 13 February 2024. The tournament was won by Gary Anderson, who defeated Ryan Searle 8–5 in the final.

Quarter-finals (best of 11 legs)
17	Peter Wright 99.77	6
Robert Owen 87.92	2
29	Raymond van Barneveld 85.50	3
12	Gary Anderson 97.38	6
Martin Lukeman 93.64	6
Callan Rydz 90.51	2
14	Ryan Searle 92.17	6
Niels Zonneveld 90.16	4

Semi-finals (best of 13 legs)
17	Peter Wright 93.42	5
12	Gary Anderson 108.00	7
Martin Lukeman 92.63	6
14	Ryan Searle 99.51	7

Final (best of 15 legs)
12	Gary Anderson 101.14	8
14	Ryan Searle 91.33	5

=== Players Championship 3 ===
Players Championship 3 was contested on Monday 19 February 2024. Ryan Meikle hit a nine-dart finish against Geert Nentjes. The tournament was won by Ryan Searle, who defeated Gary Anderson 8–7 in the final.

Quarter-finals (best of 11 legs)
16	Peter Wright 95.83	2
9	Gary Anderson 102.59	6
Luke Littler 93.70	4
Callan Rydz 103.43	6
Steve Lennon 90.09	5
7	Michael van Gerwen 92.31	6
14	Ryan Searle 102.26	6
11	Danny Noppert 96.02	4

Semi-finals (best of 13 legs)
9	Gary Anderson 111.71	7
Callan Rydz 100.76	4
7	Michael van Gerwen 97.04	4
14	Ryan Searle 96.58	7

Final (best of 15 legs)
9	Gary Anderson 108.61	7
14	Ryan Searle 107.63	8

=== Players Championship 4 ===
Players Championship 4 was contested on Tuesday 20 February 2024. The tournament was won by Damon Heta, who defeated Chris Dobey 8–4 in the final.

Quarter-finals (best of 11 legs)
16	Peter Wright 94.67	6
Scott Williams 90.91	5
4	Dirk van Duijvenbode 90.18	2
28	Chris Dobey 89.95	6
Christian Perez 90.92	6
26	Raymond van Barneveld 79.35	2
3	Damon Heta 94.79	6
27	Brendan Dolan 94.23	3

Semi-finals (best of 13 legs)
16	Peter Wright 91.55	6
28	Chris Dobey 98.54	7
Christian Perez 90.09	2
3	Damon Heta 97.11	7

Final (best of 15 legs)
28	Chris Dobey 106.44	4
3	Damon Heta 103.37	8

== March ==
=== Players Championship 5 ===
Players Championship 5 was contested on 18 March 2024. Michael Smith hit a nine-dart finish against Raymond van Barneveld. The tournament was won by van Barneveld, who defeated Stephen Bunting 8–1 in the final.

Quarter-finals (best of 11 legs)
James Hurrell 95.15	3
25	Raymond van Barneveld 93.95	6
4	Gary Anderson 97.60	6
12	Peter Wright 99.42	4
15	Stephen Bunting 97.06	6
7	Danny Noppert 90.34	2
14	Ross Smith 96.31	6
Cameron Menzies 91.67	3

Semi-finals (best of 13 legs)
25	Raymond van Barneveld 98.49	7
4	Gary Anderson 101.18	6
15	Stephen Bunting 97.16	7
14	Ross Smith 94.11	5

Final (best of 15 legs)
25	Raymond van Barneveld 95.28	8
15	Stephen Bunting 93.89	1

=== Players Championship 6 ===
Players Championship 6 was contested on 19 March 2024. The tournament was won by Dave Chisnall, who defeated Dirk van Duijvenbode 8–6 in the final.

Quarter-finals (best of 11 legs)
Danny Jansen 92.27	5
8	Dirk van Duijvenbode 94.63	6
20	Daryl Gurney 100.20	6
Connor Scutt 83.36	0
2	Dave Chisnall 102.10	6
23	Martin Schindler 82.93	2
14	Ross Smith 94.15	6
Karel Sedláček 97.93	3

Semi-finals (best of 13 legs)
8	Dirk van Duijvenbode 97.10	7
20	Daryl Gurney 93.14	6
2	Dave Chisnall 95.29	7
14	Ross Smith 94.99	4

Final (best of 15 legs)
8	Dirk van Duijvenbode 91.47	6
2	Dave Chisnall 90.07	8

== April ==
=== Players Championship 7 ===
Players Championship 7 was contested on 8 April 2024. Steve Beaton hit a nine-dart finish against James Hurrell, whilst Daryl Gurney also hit one against Jeffrey de Graaf and Chris Dobey did the same against Mickey Mansell. The tournament was won by Dobey, who defeated Josh Rock 8–4 in the final.

Quarter-finals (best of 11 legs)
17	Ross Smith 101.54	6
Ryan Meikle 93.76	4
20	Daryl Gurney 94.12	4
21	Chris Dobey 95.65	6
31	Luke Woodhouse 97.54	6
Ian White 91.40	3
Thibault Tricole 92.98	4
6	Josh Rock 90.04	6

Semi-finals (best of 13 legs)
17	Ross Smith 97.86	3
21	Chris Dobey 109.63	7
31	Luke Woodhouse 92.54	3
6	Josh Rock 98.41	7

Final (best of 15 legs)
21	Chris Dobey 99.52	8
6	Josh Rock 97.18	4

=== Players Championship 8 ===
Players Championship 8 was contested on 9 April 2024. The tournament was won by Danny Noppert, who defeated Luke Humphries 8–6 in the final.

Quarter-finals (best of 11 legs)
1	Luke Humphries 97.13	6
8	Gary Anderson 94.40	4
Stefan Bellmont 87.87	5
21	Gian van Veen 90.02	6
Radek Szagański 94.82	6
26	Andrew Gilding 91.85	5
Kevin Doets 90.80	3
11	Danny Noppert 100.95	6

Semi-finals (best of 13 legs)
1	Luke Humphries 92.07	7
21	Gian van Veen 99.98	6
Radek Szagański 88.80	2
11	Danny Noppert 91.85	7

Final (best of 15 legs)
1	Luke Humphries 95.70	6
11	Danny Noppert 95.59	8

== May ==
=== Players Championship 9 ===
Players Championship 9 was contested on 6 May 2024. The tournament was won by Michael Smith, who defeated Ryan Joyce 8–6 in the final.

Quarter-finals (best of 11 legs)
16	Ryan Joyce 100.68	6
8	Chris Dobey 102.04	4
29	Callan Rydz 93.19	5
28	Ritchie Edhouse 97.40	6
18	Michael Smith 109.91	6
23	Luke Woodhouse 99.61	3
19	Krzysztof Ratajski 104.58	6
6	Stephen Bunting 104.27	4

Semi-finals (best of 13 legs)
16	Ryan Joyce 96.78	7
28	Ritchie Edhouse 90.30	4
18	Michael Smith 95.73	7
19	Krzysztof Ratajski 91.54	4

Final (best of 15 legs)
16	Ryan Joyce 92.09	6
18	Michael Smith 88.39	8

=== Players Championship 10 ===
Players Championship 10 was contested on 7 May 2024. Darryl Pilgrim hit a nine-dart finish against Jelle Klaasen. The tournament was won by Brendan Dolan, who defeated Jeffrey de Graaf 8–4 in the final.

Quarter-finals (best of 11 legs)
16	Daryl Gurney 95.85	5
24	Brendan Dolan 98.56	6
Graham Hall 92.64	6
5	Danny Noppert 97.15	5
Scott Williams 95.19	5
Jeffrey de Graaf 93.80	6
19	Krzysztof Ratajski 99.76	6
6	Stephen Bunting 99.03	2

Semi-finals (best of 13 legs)
24	Brendan Dolan 93.29	7
Graham Hall 89.18	5
Jeffrey de Graaf 92.85	7
19	Krzysztof Ratajski 95.86	5

Final (best of 15 legs)
24	Brendan Dolan 98.14	8
Jeffrey de Graaf 88.50	4

== June ==
=== Players Championship 11 ===
Players Championship 11 was contested on 11 June 2024. Stephen Bunting and Adam Hunt both hit a nine-dart finish in their matches against Robbie Knops and Kim Huybrechts respectively. The tournament was won by Alan Soutar, who defeated Daryl Gurney 8–7 in the final.

Quarter-finals (best of 11 legs)
17	Raymond van Barneveld 95.05	6
24	Kevin Doets 95.96	4
20	James Wade 89.01	4
12	Daryl Gurney 94.99	6
Alan Soutar 93.02	6
Niels Zonneveld 91.94	3
Madars Razma 81.25	1
22	Dirk van Duijvenbode 95.10	6

Semi-finals (best of 13 legs)
17	Raymond van Barneveld 83.82	4
12	Daryl Gurney 91.43	7
Alan Soutar 102.15	7
22	Dirk van Duijvenbode 93.85	0

Final (best of 15 legs)
12	Daryl Gurney 85.38	7
Alan Soutar 93.63	8

=== Players Championship 12 ===
Players Championship 12 was contested on 12 June 2024. Boris Krčmar hit a nine–dart finish in his match against Robert Grundy. The tournament was won by Dimitri Van den Bergh, who defeated Matt Campbell 8–3 in the final.

Quarter-finals (best of 11 legs)
Boris Krčmar 92.81	3
Dimitri Van den Bergh 97.91	6
Madars Razma 86.06	6
12	Michael van Gerwen 85.30	3
31	Richard Veenstra 94.68	5
Matt Campbell 95.42	6
3	Danny Noppert 99.51	6
Keane Barry 95.34	4

Semi-finals (best of 13 legs)
Dimitri Van den Bergh 87.19	7
Madars Razma 92.90	3
Matt Campbell 96.17	7
3	Danny Noppert 97.55	4

Final (best of 15 legs)
Dimitri Van den Bergh 87.42	8
Matt Campbell 87.31	3

== July ==
=== Players Championship 13 ===
Players Championship 13 was contested on 2 July 2024. The tournament was won by Ross Smith, who defeated Wesley Plaisier 8–7 in the final.

Quarter-finals (best of 11 legs)
Niels Zonneveld 86.15	3
Wesley Plaisier 95.63	6
Cam Crabtree 85.64	6
28	James Wade 86.59	3
Andy Boulton 84.63	6
26	Andrew Gilding 83.05	3
19	Jonny Clayton 93.30	4
6	Ross Smith 94.93	6

Semi-finals (best of 13 legs)
Wesley Plaisier 101.64	7
Cam Crabtree 90.44	3
Andy Boulton 89.17	2
6	Ross Smith 92.01	7

Final (best of 15 legs)
Wesley Plaisier 104.79	7
6	Ross Smith 107.35	8

=== Players Championship 14 ===
Players Championship 14 was contested on 3 July 2024. The tournament was won by Jonny Clayton, who defeated Wesley Plaisier 8–5 in the final.

Quarter-finals (best of 11 legs)
17	Ryan Joyce 111.48	6
8	Josh Rock 103.93	1
Wesley Plaisier 84.67	6
Graham Usher 82.68	2
Cameron Menzies 100.35	6
7	Damon Heta 98.51	3
19	Jonny Clayton 95.40	6
11	Martin Schindler 91.32	4

Semi-finals (best of 13 legs)
17	Ryan Joyce 88.67	4
Wesley Plaisier 93.28	7
Cameron Menzies 94.15	3
19	Jonny Clayton 99.89	7

Final (best of 15 legs)
Wesley Plaisier 100.36	5
19	Jonny Clayton 106.05	8

=== Players Championship 15 ===
Players Championship 15 was contested on 31 July 2024. The tournament was won by Luke Littler, who defeated Wessel Nijman 8–6 in the final, for his second title of the year.

Quarter-finals (best of 11 legs)
Stefan Bellmont 90.84	1
9	Damon Heta 112.04	6
Wessel Nijman 96.53	6
6	Gary Anderson 101.66	5
15	Luke Littler 101.68	6
23	Krzysztof Ratajski 95.61	4
14	Chris Dobey 105.41	6
Mike De Decker 90.16	1

Semi-finals (best of 13 legs)
9	Damon Heta 104.56	5
Wessel Nijman 99.83	7
15	Luke Littler 103.32	7
14	Chris Dobey 100.77	2

Final (best of 15 legs)
Wessel Nijman 91.61	6
15	Luke Littler 99.66	8

== August ==
=== Players Championship 16 ===
Players Championship 16 was contested on 1 August 2024. The tournament was won by Mike De Decker, who defeated Ricky Evans 8–2 in the final.

Quarter-finals (best of 11 legs)
32	Mike De Decker 97.93	6
25	Brendan Dolan 100.22	5
Gabriel Clemens 88.60	4
Karel Sedláček 90.42	6
2	Luke Humphries 98.23	6
Cameron Menzies 93.41	3
Ricky Evans 96.35	6
Connor Scutt 102.95	5

Semi-finals (best of 13 legs)
32	Mike De Decker 96.54	7
Karel Sedláček 93.20	5
2	Luke Humphries 89.61	4
Ricky Evans 89.98	7

Final (best of 15 legs)
32	Mike De Decker 104.87	8
Ricky Evans 94.10	2

=== Players Championship 17 ===
Players Championship 17 was contested on 2 August 2024. Luke Woodhouse hit a nine-dart finish in his 6–0 win over Richie Burnett. The tournament was won by Josh Rock, who defeated Joe Cullen 8–6 in the final.

Quarter-finals (best of 11 legs)
Florian Hempel 91.37	6
9	Ryan Searle 94.54	5
29	Joe Cullen 91.21	6
James Hurrell 84.17	4
2	Ross Smith 103.60	6
Keane Barry 99.64	4
30	Cameron Menzies 101.88	5
6	Josh Rock 92.65	6

Semi-finals (best of 13 legs)
Florian Hempel 85.62	2
29	Joe Cullen 101.98	7
2	Ross Smith 96.43	6
6	Josh Rock 102.05	7

Final (best of 15 legs)
29	Joe Cullen 92.25	6
6	Josh Rock 95.63	8

=== Players Championship 18 ===
Players Championship 18 was contested on 21 August 2024. Ross Smith hit a nine-dart finish in his match against Dom Taylor. The tournament was won by Damon Heta, who defeated Ryan Searle 8–3 in the final.

Quarter-finals (best of 11 legs)
Jim Williams 83.10	0
24	Cameron Menzies 100.20	6
4	Danny Noppert 95.81	1
5	Damon Heta 102.00	6
2	Ross Smith 104.72	5
7	Ryan Searle 106.47	6
Steve Beaton 94.16	6
11	Michael van Gerwen 95.18	4

Semi-finals (best of 13 legs)
24	Cameron Menzies 106.66	6
5	Damon Heta 100.38	7
7	Ryan Searle 99.21	7
Steve Beaton 95.06	4

Final (best of 15 legs)
5	Damon Heta 106.80	8
7	Ryan Searle 97.30	3

=== Players Championship 19 ===
Players Championship 19 was contested on 22 August 2024. The tournament was won by Chris Dobey, who defeated Cameron Menzies 8–6 in the final.

Quarter-finals (best of 11 legs)
Mensur Suljović 83.94	1
9	Chris Dobey 105.52	6
13	Daryl Gurney 93.92	6
5	Danny Noppert 98.14	2
Martin Lukeman 95.90	5
23	Cameron Menzies 103.86	6
Thibault Tricole 89.82	6
Nathan Rafferty 86.12	3

Semi-finals (best of 13 legs)
9	Chris Dobey 92.38	7
13	Daryl Gurney 90.27	3
23	Cameron Menzies 92.88	7
Thibault Tricole 91.41	6

Final (best of 15 legs)
9	Chris Dobey 100.47	8
23	Cameron Menzies 100.09	6

== September ==
=== Players Championship 20 ===
Players Championship 20 was contested on 17 September 2024 at the Robin Park Tennis Centre in Wigan. Andrew Gilding hit a nine-dart finish in his match against Wessel Nijman, as did Vincent van der Voort in his match against Mensur Suljović. The tournament was won by Luke Littler, who defeated Stephen Bunting 8–7 in the final, for his third title of the year.

Quarter-finals (best of 11 legs)
1	Dave Chisnall 101.31	6
8	Ryan Searle 99.54	5
4	Luke Humphries 101.05	2
5	Luke Littler 101.10	6
31	Jermaine Wattimena 92.63	2
10	Stephen Bunting 101.84	6
14	Gerwyn Price	6
22	Cameron Menzies	4

Semi-finals (best of 13 legs)
1	Dave Chisnall 92.72	2
5	Luke Littler 99.53	7
10	Stephen Bunting 99.57	7
14	Gerwyn Price 92.25	5

Final (best of 15 legs)
5	Luke Littler 99.28	8
10	Stephen Bunting 99.03	7

=== Players Championship 21 ===
Players Championship 21 was contested on 18 September 2024. It was won by Michael van Gerwen, who defeated Dave Chisnall 8–4 in the final, for his first ranking title of the year.

Quarter-finals (best of 11 legs)
1	Dave Chisnall 92.44	6
9	Stephen Bunting 84.15	2
4	Damon Heta 88.36	5
21	Ritchie Edhouse 85.41	6
Maik Kuivenhoven 86.03	6
Benjamin Drue Reus 82.45	2
14	Gian van Veen 95.27	3
11	Michael van Gerwen 100.54	6

Semi-finals (best of 13 legs)
1	Dave Chisnall 98.07	7
21	Ritchie Edhouse 93.56	6
Maik Kuivenhoven 88.81	2
11	Michael van Gerwen 96.30	7

Final (best of 15 legs)
1	Dave Chisnall 100.63	4
11	Michael van Gerwen 106.67	8

=== Players Championship 22 ===
Players Championship 22 was contested on 24 September 2024 at the Leicester Arena. The tournament was won by Gary Anderson, who defeated Connor Scutt 8–4 in the final.

Quarter-finals (best of 11 legs)
Christian Kist 100.50	6
8	Stephen Bunting 101.88	3
Madars Razma 94.86	3
Connor Scutt 96.94	6
15	Jonny Clayton 84.66	3
7	Gary Anderson 100.34	6
Callan Rydz 105.16	5
22	James Wade 95.11	6

Semi-finals (best of 13 legs)
Christian Kist 91.06	3
Connor Scutt 104.89	7
7	Gary Anderson 107.76	7
22	James Wade 99.95	4

Final (best of 15 legs)
Connor Scutt 92.85	4
7	Gary Anderson 90.81	8

=== Players Championship 23 ===
Players Championship 23 was contested on 25 September 2024 at the Leicester Arena. The tournament was won by Dave Chisnall, who defeated Chris Dobey 8–4 in the final. Dobey hit a nine-dart finish in his match against Martin Schindler as did Adam Warner in his match against Jurjen van der Velde.

Quarter-finals (best of 11 legs)
1	Dave Chisnall 108.72	6
Mervyn King 97.89	2
4	Damon Heta 99.75	5
Stephen Burton 94.84	6
31	Martin Lukeman 88.18	3
10	Martin Schindler 88.64	6
14	Jonny Clayton 96.60	5
6	Chris Dobey 101.26	6

Semi-finals (best of 13 legs)
1	Dave Chisnall 102.27	7
Stephen Burton 101.60	4
10	Martin Schindler 91.89	2
6	Chris Dobey 103.52	7

Final (best of 15 legs)
1	Dave Chisnall 92.95	8
6	Chris Dobey 96.29	4

== October ==
=== Players Championship 24 ===
Players Championship 24 was contested on 1 October 2024. Gary Anderson hit a nine-dart finish in his match against Jamie Hughes. The tournament was won by Wessel Nijman, who defeated Stephen Bunting 8–5 in the final.

Quarter-finals (best of 11 legs)
Dom Taylor 103.63	5
8	Gary Anderson 108.78	6
29	Wessel Nijman 98.92	6
Krzysztof Ratajski 94.89	2
Ted Evetts 93.48	5
7	Stephen Bunting 94.31	6
3	Luke Littler 106.48	6
Martijn Dragt 91.03	3

Semi-finals (best of 13 legs)
8	Gary Anderson 93.78	5
29	Wessel Nijman 94.72	7
7	Stephen Bunting 92.35	7
3	Luke Littler 91.00	6

Final (best of 15 legs)
29	Wessel Nijman 99.63	8
7	Stephen Bunting 101.11	5

=== Players Championship 25 ===
Players Championship 25 was contested on 2 October 2024. The tournament was won by Chris Dobey, who defeated Stephen Bunting 8–3 in the final, for his third title of the year.

Quarter-finals (best of 11 legs)
1	Dave Chisnall 94.77	5
25	Andrew Gilding 97.09	6
Connor Scutt 96.67	4
5	Stephen Bunting 97.28	6
2	Luke Littler 99.18	5
7	Chris Dobey 101.06	6
14	Daryl Gurney 94.97	6
22	Ryan Joyce 95.37	4

Semi-finals (best of 13 legs)
25	Andrew Gilding 92.15	4
5	Stephen Bunting 97.14	7
7	Chris Dobey 104.09	7
14	Daryl Gurney 85.64	1

Final (best of 15 legs)
5	Stephen Bunting 96.35	3
7	Chris Dobey 98.16	8

=== Players Championship 26 ===
Players Championship 26 was contested on 3 October 2024. The tournament was won by Luke Humphries, who defeated Stephen Bunting 8–7 in the final.

Quarter-finals (best of 11 legs)
1	Dave Chisnall 101.71	5
9	Luke Humphries 97.61	6
Christian Kist 94.86	3
28	Luke Woodhouse 91.53	6
15	Raymond van Barneveld 92.43	6
10	Danny Noppert 94.12	5
Robert Owen 97.06	4
6	Stephen Bunting 101.81	6

Semi-finals (best of 13 legs)
9	Luke Humphries 98.79	7
28	Luke Woodhouse 95.84	6
15	Raymond van Barneveld 96.92	6
6	Stephen Bunting 100.51	7

Final (best of 15 legs)
9	Luke Humphries 93.84	8
6	Stephen Bunting 96.92	7

=== Players Championship 27 ===
Players Championship 27 was contested on 15 October 2024. Ryan Searle hit a nine-dart finish in his win against Jermaine Wattimena. The tournament was won by Michael van Gerwen, who defeated Gerwyn Price 8–4 in the final.

Quarter-finals (best of 11 legs)
16	Gerwyn Price 101.36	6
8	Damon Heta 104.05	1
4	Ryan Searle 106.10	6
Keane Barry 90.39	1
15	Jonny Clayton 98.90	5
10	Michael van Gerwen 98.82	6
3	Stephen Bunting 91.98	5
22	Wessel Nijman 95.35	6

Semi-finals (best of 13 legs)
16	Gerwyn Price 97.90	7
4	Ryan Searle 99.56	4
10	Michael van Gerwen 95.89	7
22	Wessel Nijman 96.45	2

Final (best of 15 legs)
16	Gerwyn Price 93.47	4
10	Michael van Gerwen 95.52	8

=== Players Championship 28 ===
Players Championship 28 was contested on 16 October 2024. Jamie Hughes and Callum Goffin hit a nine-dart finish in their losses to Niels Zonneveld and Jelle Klaasen respectively. Josh Rock also hit a nine dart finish in his win over George Killington. The tournament was won by Wesley Plaisier, who defeated Josh Rock 8–7 in the final.

Quarter-finals (best of 11 legs)
16	Jonny Clayton 97.18	4
9	Josh Rock 90.15	6
29	Dirk van Duijvenbode 97.79	6
21	Ryan Joyce 90.03	2
Wesley Plaisier 94.10	6
José de Sousa 93.69	5
19	Michael Smith 96.23	5
11	Danny Noppert 96.92	6

Semi-finals (best of 13 legs)
9	Josh Rock 95.64	7
29	Dirk van Duijvenbode 95.58	6
Wesley Plaisier 103.07	7
11	Danny Noppert 104.36	5

Final (best of 15 legs)
9	Josh Rock 92.66	7
Wesley Plaisier 92.24	8

=== Players Championship 29 ===
Players Championship 29 was contested on 30 October 2024. Callan Rydz, Ricardo Pietreczko, and Chris Landman hit nine-dart finishes in their victories over Keane Barry, Radek Szagański and Ross Smith respectively. The tournament was won by Cameron Menzies, who defeated Stephen Bunting 8–4 in the final.

Quarter-finals (best of 11 legs)
16	Michael Smith 95.27	5
8	Danny Noppert 91.72	6
20	Cameron Menzies 95.85	6
21	James Wade 93.62	2
2	Stephen Bunting 94.90	6
7	Damon Heta 96.11	5
Mensur Suljović 86.20	4
Chris Landman 87.55	6

Semi-finals (best of 13 legs)
8	Danny Noppert 92.87	1
20	Cameron Menzies 99.12	7
2	Stephen Bunting 92.25	7
Chris Landman 88.45	2

Final (best of 15 legs)
20	Cameron Menzies 93.84	8
2	Stephen Bunting 94.30	4

=== Players Championship 30 ===
Players Championship 30 was contested on 31 October 2024. Dave Chisnall hit a nine-dart finish in his loss to William O'Connor. The tournament was won by Josh Rock, who defeated Jonny Clayton 8–7 in the final.

Quarter-finals (best of 11 legs)
William O'Connor 97.05	6
8	Damon Heta 98.56	4
20	Wessel Nijman 96.96	5
5	Josh Rock 93.38	6
2	Ryan Searle 85.88	6
Madars Razma 89.09	5
Arron Monk 89.75	5
11	Jonny Clayton 94.39	6

Semi-finals (best of 13 legs)
William O'Connor 92.36	3
5	Josh Rock 99.90	7
2	Ryan Searle 95.76	4
11	Jonny Clayton 103.26	7

Final (best of 15 legs)
5	Josh Rock 102.49	8
11	Jonny Clayton 106.38	7

== Players Championship Order of Merit ==
The top 64 players from the Players Championships Order of Merit, which was solely based on prize money won in the thirty Players Championship events during the season, qualified for the 2024 Players Championship Finals, held in November. [Note - Forty-seventh ranked player Dom Taylor received a ban from the Professional Darts Corporation following the failure of a drugs test. Sixty-fifth ranked player Nick Kenny came directly into the Players Championship Finals draw to replace him.]

Prize money in the table is in units of £1,000.

Rank	Player	Prize money	Rank	Player	Prize money
1	Chris Dobey	98	33	Niels Zonneveld	34
2	Stephen Bunting	97	34	Connor Scutt	34
3	Damon Heta	85.5	35	Madars Razma	33
4	Ryan Searle	79.5	36	Thibault Tricole	33
5	Dave Chisnall	76	37	Kevin Doets	33
6	Gary Anderson	73.5	38	Martin Schindler	32.5
7	Josh Rock	71.5	39	Jermaine Wattimena	32.5
8	Luke Littler	71.5	40	Luke Woodhouse	32
9	Danny Noppert	71	41	Stephen Burton	32
10	Jonny Clayton	70	42	Callan Rydz	32
11	Cameron Menzies	66.5	43	Karel Sedláček	31.5
12	Ross Smith	61	44	Mensur Suljović	30.5
13	Wessel Nijman	60.5	45	Scott Williams	30
14	Raymond van Barneveld	59	46	Gabriel Clemens	28.5
15	Daryl Gurney	58.5	47	Dom Taylor	28.5
16	Mike De Decker	55.5	48	Ian White	28
17	Michael van Gerwen	54	49	Richard Veenstra	27
18	Michael Smith	54	50	Peter Wright	27
19	Luke Humphries	51	51	Chris Landman	26.5
20	Gian van Veen	47.5	52	Kim Huybrechts	26.5
21	Wesley Plaisier	46.5	53	Dimitri Van den Bergh	26
22	Ryan Joyce	44	54	Jim Williams	26
23	Dirk van Duijvenbode	43.5	55	Florian Hempel	25.5
24	James Wade	42	56	James Hurrell	25.5
25	Ritchie Edhouse	41	57	Rob Cross	25
26	Alan Soutar	40.5	58	Ricky Evans	25
27	Brendan Dolan	39	59	Ryan Meikle	24.5
28	Andrew Gilding	37.5	60	Joe Cullen	24
29	Gerwyn Price	36.5	61	Jeffrey de Graaf	23.5
30	Krzysztof Ratajski	36	62	Mervyn King	23
31	Martin Lukeman	35.5	63	Mario Vandenbogaerde	23
32	William O'Connor	34.5	64	Nathan Aspinall	22

== Top averages ==
The table lists all players who achieved a three-dart average of at least 110 in a match. In the case one player has multiple records, this is indicated by the number in brackets.

#	Player	Round	Average	Event	Result	Ref
1	Gary Anderson	3	123.83	15	Won	
2	Ritchie Edhouse	1	120.24	26	Won	
3	Gary Anderson (2)	4	117.12	2	Won	
4	Robert Owen	3	115.85	14	Won	
5	Krzysztof Ratajski	2	115.35	5	Won	
6	Andrew Gilding	1	115.12	30	Won	
7	Gary Anderson (3)	4	114.41	24	Won	
8	Gary Anderson (4)	3	114.15	8	Won	
9	Dave Chisnall	1	114.03	10	Won	
10	Andrew Gilding (2)	2	114.00	20	Won	
11	Gary Anderson (5)	4	113.97	5	Won	
12	Wessel Nijman	1	113.50	27	Won	
13	Josh Rock	1	113.39	29	Won	
14	Ross Smith	1	113.23	15	Won	
15	Gerwyn Price	1	113.05	8	Won	
16	Damon Heta	3	112.73	30	Won	
17	Raymond van Barneveld	1	112.71	21	Lost	
18	Gary Anderson (6)	3	112.66	25	Won	
19	Damon Heta (2)	Quarter-Final	112.04	15	Won	
20	Gary Anderson (7)	1	112.02	3	Won	
21	Dave Chisnall (2)	4	112.02	6	Won	
22	Ryan Searle	Final	111.71	1	Lost	
23	Gary Anderson (8)	Semi-Final	111.71	3	Won	
24	Gian van Veen	3	111.57	19	Lost	
25	Ryan Joyce	Quarter-Final	111.48	14	Won	
26	Gary Anderson (9)	1	111.17	10	Won	
27	Gary Anderson (10)	3	111.03	24	Won	
28	Josh Rock (2)	4	110.89	28	Won	
29	Steve Lennon	1	110.83	4	Won	
30	Gerwyn Price (2)	2	110.77	1	Won	
31	Mike De Decker	2	110.65	26	Won	
32	Dirk van Duijvenbode	1	110.64	27	Lost	
33	Gabriel Clemens	2	110.55	22	Won	
34	Damon Heta (3)	1	110.37	30	Won	
