= Shaun McDonald (darts player) =

Belgian darts player

Personal information
- Full name: Shaun McDonald
- Nickname: "The Punisher"
- Born: 4 June 1985 (age 41) Aberdeen, Aberdeenshire, Scotland
- Home town: Aberdeen, Scotland

Sport
- Sport: Darts
- Playing since: 2002
- Darts: 21g Mission Shaun McDonald
- Laterality: Right-handed
- Walk-on music: "Old MacDonald Had a Farm" by Super Simple Songs

Organisation (see split in darts)
- BDO: 2002–2020
- PDC: 2006–2007, 2021–
- WDF: 2002–

WDF major events – best performances
- World Championship: Last 48: 2022, 2023
- World Masters: Last 64: 2022

PDC premier events – best performances
- UK Open: Last 96: 2006, 2007

Other tournament wins
- Years
Irish Classic	2021
PDC Challenge Tour	2021
Youth events
World Youth Masters	2002

Shaun McDonald (born 4 June 1985) is a Scottish professional darts player who currently plays in World Darts Federation (WDF) events. He is a World Youth Master and won a PDC Challenge Tour tournament in 2021. He also qualified two times for the WDF World Darts Championship.

== Career ==
After winning the World Youth Masters in 2002, hopes for a strong career for McDonald were high. A year later he was in the men's field for the first time, but didn't make it past the second round. In 2006, McDonald made his UK Open debut, where he was eliminated after winning in the second round. McDonald took part in the PDC Pro Tour, which was still open at the time, on several occasions, where he once reached the Last 16 phase.

In 2021, McDonald played in the PDC Q-School and then the 2021 PDC Challenge Tour series. Here he celebrated his greatest career success, because he was able to win the fifth event of the year. In November, McDonald then secured the title at the Irish Classic, after a quarter-final at the Denmark Open. 15 years after his last appearance at the UK Open, he celebrated his comeback there in 2022, but conceded a whitewash against compatriot Jamie Clark right at the start. McDonald's consistent results saw him participate in the 2022 WDF World Darts Championship, where he lost to Dave Parletti in the first round by 1–2 in sets.

During the 2022 Winmau World Masters he advanced to the third round, where he lost to eventual winner Wesley Plaisier by 0–5 in legs. On 13 December he won the qualification for the 2023 WDF World Darts Championship.

== World Championship results ==
=== WDF ===
- 2022: First round (lost to Dave Parletti 1–2)
- 2023: First round (lost to Jonny Tata 1–2)

== Performance timeline ==
=== BDO ===
Tournament	2003	2006
BDO Ranked televised events
World Masters	1R	1R

=== WDF ===
Tournament	2022	2023
WDF Ranked televised events
World Championship	1R	1R
World Masters	3R	NH

=== PDC ===
Tournament	2006	2007	2022
PDC Ranked televised events
UK Open	2R	2R	1R
