= 2022 UK Open =

2022 Cazoo UK Open

Tournament information
- Dates: 4–6 March 2022
- Venue: Butlin's Minehead
- Location: Minehead, England
- Organisation(s): Professional Darts Corporation (PDC)
- Format: Legs; Final – best of 21
- Prize fund: £450,000
- Winner's share: £100,000
- Nine-dart finish: José Justicia; James Wade; Michael Smith
- High checkout: 170; Rowby-John Rodriguez; William Borland; Ian White; Gabriel Clemens; Dirk van Duijvenbode; Simon Whitlock; Michael Smith

Champion(s)
- Danny Noppert (NED)

The 2022 Cazoo UK Open was a professional darts tournament that was held from 4 to 6 March 2022 at Butlin's Minehead, England, returning to the venue after the 2021 edition was held behind closed doors at the Arena MK in Milton Keynes due to the COVID-19 pandemic. It was the twentieth edition of the tournament to be organised by the Professional Darts Corporation.

James Wade was the defending champion after defeating Luke Humphries 11–5 in the 2021 final, but he lost 10–4 to Keane Barry in the quarter-finals.

Danny Noppert won his first PDC major tournament, beating Michael Smith 11–10 in the final after Smith had a dart for the title.

The tournament saw three nine-dart finishes. José Justicia hit the first in his third round game against Adam Gawlas. Defending champion James Wade also hit one during his sixth round game against Boris Krčmar. Michael Smith hit another in his own sixth round game against Mensur Suljović.

== Format ==
The 158 participants entered the competition incrementally, with 63 players entering in the first round, with match winners joining the 32 players entering in the second and third rounds to leave the last 64 in the fourth round.

- No players are seeded.
- A random draw is held for each of the following rounds following the conclusion of the third round.
- All matches in the first, second and third rounds will be played over best of 11 legs.
- All matches in the fourth, fifth and sixth rounds and quarter-finals will be played over best of 19 legs.
- All matches in the semi-finals and final will be played over best of 21 legs.
- Eight boards will be used for matches in the first, second, third and fourth rounds.
- Four boards will be used for matches in the fifth round.
- Two boards will be used for matches in the sixth round.
- One board will be used for all the matches in the quarter-finals, semi-finals and final.

== Prize money ==
The prize fund remained at £450,000.

Stage (no. of players)		Prize money (Total: £450,000)
Winner	(1)	£100,000
Runner-up	(1)	£40,000
Semi-finalists	(2)	£20,000
Quarter-finalists	(4)	£12,500
Last 16 (sixth round)	(8)	£7,500
Last 32 (fifth round)	(16)	£4,000
Last 64 (fourth round)	(32)	£2,000
Last 96 (third round)	(32)	£1,000
Last 128 (second round)	(32)	n/a
Last 160 (first round)	(32)	n/a

== Qualification ==
The 128 Tour Card holders had a staggered entry based on their world ranking on 28 February 2022. They were joined by the top 4 players from each of the 2021 UK & European Challenge & Development Tour Orders of Merit, and by the winners of 16 Amateur Qualification events organised through Rileys Sports Bars.

=== Number 1–32 of the PDC Order of Merit (receiving byes into fourth round) ===
1. Gerwyn Price
2. Peter Wright
3. Michael van Gerwen
4. James Wade
5. Michael Smith
6. Gary Anderson
7. José de Sousa
8. Jonny Clayton
9. Dimitri Van den Bergh
10. Rob Cross
11. Joe Cullen
12. Krzysztof Ratajski
13. Dave Chisnall
14. Dirk van Duijvenbode
15. Nathan Aspinall
16. Ryan Searle
17. Mervyn King
18. Luke Humphries
19. Danny Noppert
20. Stephen Bunting
21. Daryl Gurney
22. Gabriel Clemens
23. Simon Whitlock
24. Brendan Dolan
25. Devon Petersen
26. Ian White
27. Damon Heta
28. Mensur Suljović
29. Vincent van der Voort
30. Callan Rydz
31. Glen Durrant
32. Chris Dobey

=== Number 33–64 of the PDC Order of Merit (receiving byes into third round) ===
33. Ross Smith
34. Kim Huybrechts
35. Ryan Joyce
36. Jermaine Wattimena
37. William O'Connor
38. Jamie Hughes
39. Ricky Evans
40. Martijn Kleermaker
41. Adrian Lewis
42. Adam Hunt
43. Darius Labanauskas
44. Jason Lowe
45. Steve Lennon
46. Jeffrey de Zwaan
47. Madars Razma
48. Luke Woodhouse
49. Alan Soutar
50. Maik Kuivenhoven
51. Ron Meulenkamp
52. Steve Beaton
53. Andy Boulton
54. Raymond van Barneveld
55. Steve West
56. William Borland
57. Ryan Meikle
58. Keegan Brown
59. Boris Krčmar
60. Jeff Smith
61. Florian Hempel
62. Ritchie Edhouse
63. Mike De Decker
64. Max Hopp

=== Number 65–96 of the PDC Order of Merit (receiving byes into second round) ===
65. Martin Schindler
66. Keane Barry
67. John Henderson
68. Lewy Williams
69. Scott Mitchell
70. Joe Murnan
71. Jason Heaver
72. ~~Boris Koltsov~~ (Note: Boris Koltsov withdrew after the draw was made. His drawn opponent was therefore given a bye.)
73. Gordon Mathers
74. Adam Gawlas
75. Niels Zonneveld
76. Eddie Lovely
77. Peter Hudson
78. John Michael
79. Martin Lukeman
80. Geert De Vos
81. Andrew Gilding
82. Geert Nentjes
83. Danny Baggish
84. Jonathan Worsley
85. Jack Main
86. Berry van Peer
87. John Brown
88. Connor Scutt
89. David Evans
90. Zoran Lerchbacher
91. Brett Claydon
92. Brian Raman
93. Kevin Doets
94. Jake Jones
95. Cameron Menzies
96. Krzysztof Kciuk

=== Number 97–128 of the PDC Order of Merit (starting in first round) ===
97. George Killington
98. Jamie Clark
99. Radek Szagański
100. Danny Jansen
101. Mario Vandenbogaerde
102. Jimmy Hendriks
103. John O'Shea
104. Ross Montgomery
105. Jim Williams
106. Richie Burnett
107. Darren Webster
108. Nathan Rafferty
109. Ricardo Pietreczko
110. Luc Peters
111. ~~Michael Unterbuchner~~ (Note: Michael Unterbuchner didn't compete for personal reasons. A bye was given in the first round.)
112. Damian Mol
113. José Justicia
114. Rowby-John Rodriguez
115. Bradley Brooks
116. Jules van Dongen
117. Matt Campbell
118. Tony Martinez
119. Nick Fullwell
120. Scott Waites
121. Rusty-Jake Rodriguez
122. Ted Evetts
123. James Wilson
124. Josh Rock
125. Kevin Burness
126. Mickey Mansell
127. Shaun Wilkinson
128. Vladimir Andersen

=== PDC UK Development Tour qualifiers (starting in first round) ===
The top 4 ranked players from the 2021 UK Development Tour Order of Merit who didn't have a Tour Card for the 2022 season qualified for the first round.

1. Keelan Kay
2. Dom Taylor
3. Reece Colley
4. Liam Meek

=== PDC European Development Tour qualifiers (starting in first round) ===
The top 4 ranked players from the 2021 European Development Tour Order of Merit who didn't have a Tour Card for the 2022 season qualified for the first round.

1. Fabian Schmutzler
2. Sebastian Białecki
3. Jurjen van der Velde
4. Niko Springer

=== PDC UK Challenge Tour qualifiers (starting in first round) ===
The top 4 ranked players from the 2021 UK Challenge Tour Order of Merit who didn't have a Tour Card for the 2022 season qualified for the first round.

1. Shaun McDonald
2. Martin Thomas
3. Darren Beveridge
4. Reece Robinson

=== PDC European Challenge Tour qualifiers (starting in first round) ===
The top 4 ranked players from the 2021 European Challenge Tour Order of Merit who didn't have a Tour Card for the 2022 season qualified for the first round. Steven Noster chose not to compete and was replaced in the rankings by Lukas Wenig.

1. Toni Alcinas
2. Kenny Neyens
3. Wesley Plaisier
4. Lukas Wenig

=== Riley's qualifiers (starting in first round) ===
The winners of qualifiers organised by Rileys Sports Bars, held through January and February 2022, qualified for the first round. Entry to these tournaments was open to all players who had not qualified via another method, regardless of PDC Membership status.

- Steve Clayson (NOT)
- Matt Good (NOR)
- Graham Hall (SOL)
- Ryan Harrington (HAR)
- Paul Hogan (SBF)
- Prakash Jiwa (COV)
- Jelle Klaasen (COV)
- Danny Lauby (CHO)
- Kai Fan Leung (CHE)
- Paul Marsh (NOR)
- Ryan Murray (CHO)
- Diogo Portela (VIC)
- Dan Read (SOL)
- Mark Rice (CHE)
- Scott Taylor (LIV)
- Adam Warner (LIV)

== Draw ==
=== Friday 4 March ===
==== First round (best of eleven legs) ====
Player	Score	Player	Player	Score	Player
Bradley Brooks 91.45	1 – 6	Rowby-John Rodriguez 108.66	Jelle Klaasen (Q) 85.28	6 – 5	Mark Rice (Q) 81.83
Kai Fan Leung (Q) 88.43	5 – 6	Fabian Schmutzler 83.62	Matt Campbell 73.84	1 – 6	Sebastian Białecki 82.74
Mario Vandenbogaerde 81.44	5 – 6	Jules van Dongen 77.71	Danny Lauby (Q) 94.74	6 – 5	Niko Springer 90.53
Ted Evetts 90.99	6 – 4	Nick Fullwell 88.27	Ryan Harrington (Q) 95.21	6 – 2	Rusty-Jake Rodriguez 85.75
Richie Burnett 92.75	6 – 3	Tony Martinez 90.13	Darren Webster 84.59	4 – 6	José Justicia 87.89
Martin Thomas 89.00	4 – 6	Kenny Neyens 88.29	George Killington 84.51	6 – 4	Reece Robinson 79.81
Dan Read (Q) 92.24	6 – 3	Diogo Portela (Q) 84.38	Josh Rock 93.49	5 – 6	Damian Mol 92.35
James Wilson 87.19	6 – 4	Shaun Wilkinson 85.55	Matt Good (Q) 73.82	5 – 6	Keelan Kay 82.74
Jim Williams 96.00	6 – 3	Ryan Murray (Q) 92.87	John O'Shea 78.42	6 – 0	Nathan Rafferty 75.65
Jurjen van der Velde 94.29	6 – 4	Mickey Mansell 89.88	Ricardo Pietreczko 87.65	6 – 2	Scott Taylor (Q) 80.26
Vladimir Andersen 78.50	2 – 6	Steve Clayson (Q) 84.28	Paul Hogan (Q) 85.89	6 – 4	Dom Taylor 82.26
Prakash Jiwa (Q) 81.77	6 – 2	Toni Alcinas 78.46	Darren Beveridge 82.98	3 – 6	Jimmy Hendriks 92.39
Wesley Plaisier 86.36	5 – 6	Radek Szagański 91.23	Ross Montgomery 86.16	6 – 3	Reece Colley 78.04
Danny Jansen 92.59	6 – 2	Liam Meek 88.65	Adam Warner (Q) 76.51	3 – 6	Lukas Wenig 81.11
Shaun McDonald 85.00	0 – 6	Jamie Clark 100.20	Kevin Burness 74.42	3 – 6	Graham Hall (Q) 82.16
Luc Peters 90.18	6 – 0	Paul Marsh (Q) 77.66	Scott Waites	bye	

==== Second round (best of eleven legs) ====
Player	Score	Player	Player	Score	Player
David Evans 84.27	2 – 6	Keane Barry 92.88	Lewy Williams 78.61	1 – 6	Martin Schindler 84.37
Connor Scutt 93.88	6 – 3	Jules van Dongen 84.63	James Wilson 83.89	2 – 6	John Henderson 87.81
Jonathan Worsley 82.85	5 – 6	Niels Zonneveld 92.25	John Michael 77.42	5 – 6	Danny Baggish 80.78
Ted Evetts 82.72	6 – 3	Jack Main 77.70	Rowby-John Rodriguez 97.75	6 – 4	Gordon Mathers 92.28
Berry van Peer 97.35	6 – 3	Kevin Doets 89.25	Graham Hall (Q) 97.77	6 – 5	Andrew Gilding 95.53
Peter Hudson 88.47	3 – 6	John O'Shea 88.66	Jim Williams 93.58	6 – 3	Jurjen van der Velde 92.38
Keelan Kay 81.94	1 – 6	Lukas Wenig 89.18	Jelle Klaasen (Q) 104.21	6 – 1	Cameron Menzies 93.71
Richie Burnett 89.14	3 – 6	Ryan Harrington (Q) 95.78	Geert Nentjes 84.35	6 – 3	Jake Jones 80.88
Radek Szagański 82.40	4 – 6	Scott Waites 87.26	José Justicia 89.29	6 – 2	Eddie Lovely 89.85
Paul Hogan (Q) 92.65	3 – 6	Danny Lauby (Q) 88.48	Krzysztof Kciuk 94.77	6 – 1	Brett Claydon 84.75
Jamie Clark 92.83	3 – 6	Martin Lukeman 93.88	Scott Mitchell 93.04	4 – 6	Danny Jansen 92.58
Luc Peters 92.62	6 – 2	Geert De Vos 87.10	Ricardo Pietreczko 86.71	2 – 6	Zoran Lerchbacher 91.19
Sebastian Białecki 99.02	6 – 5	Joe Murnan 91.26	John Brown 82.17	3 – 6	Damian Mol 85.48
Steve Clayson (Q) 72.48	2 – 6	Fabian Schmutzler 75.94	Adam Gawlas 88.50	6 – 3	George Killington 81.42
Ross Montgomery 83.12	6 – 2	Dan Read (Q) 79.09	Prakash Jiwa (Q) 87.72	3 – 6	Jason Heaver 88.78
Kenny Neyens 81.36	6 – 4	Jimmy Hendriks 77.82	Brian Raman	bye	~~Boris Koltsov~~

==== Third round (best of eleven legs) ====
Player	Score	Player	Player	Score	Player
Florian Hempel 87.48	6 – 3	Lukas Wenig 84.78	Raymond van Barneveld 95.64	5 – 6	William Borland 90.11
Adrian Lewis 108.65	6 – 0	Fabian Schmutzler 80.85	Madars Razma 83.43	1 – 6	Jamie Hughes 92.44
Krzysztof Kciuk 94.05	6 – 4	Ross Smith 86.57	Martin Schindler 91.31	6 – 2	Jeff Smith 87.31
Kim Huybrechts 94.25	6 – 2	Luc Peters 89.80	Max Hopp 85.69	2 – 6	Ritchie Edhouse 93.43
Martin Lukeman 91.35	6 – 3	Adam Hunt 82.19	Jason Lowe 84.82	4 – 6	Jelle Klaasen (Q) 85.31
Andy Boulton 91.80	6 – 5	Danny Lauby (Q) 88.83	Jeffrey de Zwaan 89.17	2 – 6	Keane Barry 95.58
Steve Beaton 85.65	3 – 6	Graham Hall (Q) 90.97	John O'Shea 90.03	1 – 6	Maik Kuivenhoven 95.77
José Justicia 89.96	5 – 6	Adam Gawlas 86.05	Jermaine Wattimena 94.70	6 – 5	Ross Montgomery 88.84
Keegan Brown 87.80	2 – 6	Sebastian Białecki 98.90	Steve West 95.15	6 – 3	Damian Mol 86.58
Steve Lennon 89.75	6 – 5	Ryan Harrington (Q) 86.29	Berry van Peer 86.11	2 – 6	Niels Zonneveld 95.85
Ron Meulenkamp 100.63	6 – 2	Danny Baggish 86.05	Danny Jansen 91.61	2 – 6	Ricky Evans 100.53
Darius Labanauskas 88.46	6 – 4	John Henderson 83.63	Jim Williams 95.18	6 – 5	Alan Soutar 93.33
Ryan Joyce 93.94	6 – 0	Mike De Decker 87.23	Luke Woodhouse 98.46	6 – 2	Ted Evetts 94.86
Martijn Kleermaker 86.66	5 – 6	Jason Heaver 91.82	Geert Nentjes 85.51	6 – 5	Kenny Neyens 83.26
Boris Krčmar 93.80	6 – 2	Zoran Lerchbacher 94.46	Connor Scutt 86.12	5 – 6	William O'Connor 88.94
Rowby-John Rodriguez 79.32	0 – 6	Ryan Meikle 94.93	Brian Raman 78.76	2 – 6	Scott Waites 87.96

==== Fourth round (best of nineteen legs) ====
Player	Score	Player	Player	Score	Player
Andy Boulton 95.29	5 – 10	Damon Heta 96.64	Maik Kuivenhoven 93.42	9 – 10	Simon Whitlock 93.38
Luke Woodhouse 88.31	5 – 10	Boris Krčmar 93.62	Ron Meulenkamp 87.29	10 – 9	Krzysztof Kciuk 91.18
Ritchie Edhouse 88.66	6 – 10	Sebastian Białecki 91.83	Joe Cullen 91.78	6 – 10	Peter Wright 97.18
Jason Heaver 93.76	7 – 10	William O'Connor 101.29	Jelle Klaasen (Q) 99.50	6 – 10	Devon Petersen 95.21
Steve West 85.32	7 – 10	José de Sousa 91.09	Daryl Gurney 94.57	2 – 10	Dimitri Van den Bergh 103.98
Chris Dobey 95.20	7 – 10	Michael Smith 99.96	Ryan Joyce 93.08	8 – 10	Martin Schindler 94.04
Glen Durrant 86.54	5 – 10	Scott Waites 87.46	Brendan Dolan 99.40	3 – 10	Dave Chisnall 97.57
Danny Noppert 97.07	10 – 3	Ryan Meikle 90.41	Mervyn King 83.87	4 – 10	Stephen Bunting 95.87
Geert Nentjes 92.72	10 – 5	Florian Hempel 90.42	Jamie Hughes 94.77	10 – 5	Adam Gawlas 85.18
Ian White 97.26	10 – 9	Luke Humphries 99.92	Ryan Searle 92.32	10 – 7	Adrian Lewis 94.40
Krzysztof Ratajski 91.11	5 – 10	Gerwyn Price 98.26	Darius Labanauskas 89.99	9 – 10	Ricky Evans 88.37
Dirk van Duijvenbode 99.37	10 – 6	William Borland 90.21	Rob Cross 89.83	7 – 10	Gabriel Clemens 92.00
Jim Williams 91.58	5 – 10	Niels Zonneveld 90.71	Michael van Gerwen 93.84	10 – 7	Gary Anderson 93.70
Steve Lennon 105.58	6 – 10	James Wade 104.08	Kim Huybrechts 93.09	9 – 10	Mensur Suljović 94.13
Keane Barry 99.85	10 – 7	Graham Hall (Q) 95.67	Jermaine Wattimena 93.66	5 – 10	Vincent van der Voort 96.88
Callan Rydz 88.48	10 – 9	Nathan Aspinall 87.02	Martin Lukeman 93.92	9 – 10	Jonny Clayton 95.01

=== Saturday 5 March ===
==== Fifth round (best of nineteen legs) ====
Player	Score	Player	Player	Score	Player
Ron Meulenkamp 85.22	3 – 10	James Wade 97.80	Jamie Hughes 88.67	9 – 10	Gerwyn Price 95.75
Ryan Searle 97.63	10 – 8	Dimitri Van den Bergh 97.13	Dave Chisnall 89.71	4 – 10	Boris Krčmar 97.30
Damon Heta 102.48	10 – 4	Michael van Gerwen 101.61	Dirk van Duijvenbode 105.75	10 – 4	Martin Schindler 96.19
Peter Wright 102.54	10 – 5	Simon Whitlock 90.80	Niels Zonneveld 94.58	9 – 10	Keane Barry 96.99
Callan Rydz 91.90	10 – 2	Vincent van der Voort 85.07	Jonny Clayton 98.96	10 – 1	José de Sousa 82.02
Danny Noppert 97.17	10 – 8	Devon Petersen 94.09	Scott Waites 86.60	8 – 10	Ricky Evans 89.95
Mensur Suljović 100.37	10 – 8	Geert Nentjes 95.69	Ian White 89.76	9 – 10	Sebastian Białecki 87.69
Gabriel Clemens 94.43	8 – 10	Michael Smith 99.16	William O'Connor 95.21	10 – 9	Stephen Bunting 96.54

==== Sixth round (best of nineteen legs) ====
Player	Score	Player	Player	Score	Player
Danny Noppert 99.05	10 – 2	Dirk van Duijvenbode 87.23	James Wade 98.83	10 – 8	Boris Krčmar 87.68
Damon Heta 93.88	10 – 8	Jonny Clayton 91.13	Ricky Evans 81.26	5 – 10	Keane Barry 91.54
Peter Wright 100.59	7 – 10	William O'Connor 94.29	Mensur Suljović 91.71	9 – 10	Michael Smith 92.32
Gerwyn Price 106.66	10 – 3	Callan Rydz 97.71	Ryan Searle 95.86	6 – 10	Sebastian Białecki 89.77

=== Sunday 6 March ===
==== Quarter-finals (best of nineteen legs) ====
Player	Score	Player
Keane Barry 100.19	10 – 4	James Wade 96.30
Sebastian Białecki 90.71	9 – 10	William O'Connor 87.29
Danny Noppert 95.88	10 – 5	Damon Heta 88.86
Michael Smith 98.30	10 – 7	Gerwyn Price 97.07

==== Semi-finals and Final ====
Semi-finals (best of 21 legs)
Keane Barry 94.97	6
Michael Smith 101.66	11
William O'Connor 88.35	9
Danny Noppert 89.94	11

Final (best of 21 legs)
Michael Smith 90.33	10
Danny Noppert 84.82	11
