= Andy Boulton =

Scottish darts player (born 1973)

Personal information
- Full name: Andrew Boulton
- Nickname: "X-Factor"
- Born: 25 February 1973 (age 53) Stoke-On-Trent, England
- Home town: Ardrossan, Scotland

Sport
- Sport: Darts
- Playing since: 1991
- Darts: 23g Showtime
- Laterality: Right-handed
- Walk-on music: "Juicy Wiggle" by Redfoo

Organisation (see split in darts)
- BDO: 2004–2015
- PDC: 2015–present (Tour Card: 2015–2017, 2019–2022, 2025–present)
- Current world ranking: (PDC) 82 (5 November 2026)

WDF major events – best performances
- World Championship: Last 16: 2008
- World Masters: Last 16: 2006
- Finder Masters: Group Stage: 2008

PDC premier events – best performances
- World Championship: Last 64: 2016, 2021
- UK Open: Last 16: 2011
- Grand Slam: Group Stage: 2015
- PC Finals: Last 32: 2020, 2021

Other tournament wins
- Years
ADC Championship Tour Finals	2024
Airdrie European Open	2010
Granite City Open	2009
North Lanarkshire Open	2008
PDC Challenge Tour (x4)	2023 (x2), 2024 (x2)
Scotland National Championships	2011
Tyne & Wear Open	2011

Andrew Boulton (born 25 February 1973) is a Scottish professional darts player who competes in Professional Darts Corporation (PDC) events. Nicknamed "X-Factor", he has won four titles on the PDC Challenge Tour and has participated in both the PDC World Darts Championship and the BDO World Darts Championship.

== Career ==
=== BDO, UK Open appearances ===
Boulton made his PDC major debut at the 2005 UK Open, starting in the preliminary round and reaching the third round. He was eliminated after a 5–1 loss to Colin Osborne. He made his BDO World Championship debut at the 2008 edition, eliminating 10th seed Martin Atkins in the first round. He lost to Ted Hankey in the second round. In March 2008, he won the North Lanarkshire Open by beating Robert Thornton 4–1 in the final.

Boulton qualified for the 2009 UK Open as a pub qualifier. He beat Darren Latham 6–5 in the first round but lost 6–4 to Wes Newton in the second round. Later that year, he claimed the Granite City Open title in Aberdeen by beating former world champion John Walton in the final.

Boulton suffered first-round defeats at the 2011 and 2012 BDO World Championships, losing to Robbie Green and Scott Waites. However, in the PDC, Boulton reached the last 16 of the 2011 UK Open.

=== PDC ===
After years of mainly playing in the BDO, Boulton officially crossed over to the PDC in 2015, winning a PDC Tour Card at Q-School by topping the Q-School Order of Merit. He qualified for the 2015 Grand Slam of Darts, getting through the PDC Qualifier that was held to fill the last eight spots. He was drawn into Group E with Gary Anderson, Raymond van Barneveld and Larry Butler, but failed to win a match. Boulton qualified for the 2016 PDC World Championship through the PDPA Qualifier, which saw him enter the preliminary round of the tournament. After beating Per Laursen to progress to the first round, he lost 3–0 to defending champion Gary Anderson.

He reached his first PDC European Tour semi-final at the 2018 European Darts Matchplay – defeating Cristo Reyes, Steve Beaton, Jelle Klaasen and Gerwyn Price en route. In his semi-final match, he lost 7–3 to William O'Connor.

After losing his Tour Card at the end of 2017, Boulton regained it at 2019 Q-School. He returned to Alexandra Palace at the 2020 PDC World Championship, but was defeated 3–2 by debutant Danny Baggish in the first round.

At the 2021 PDC World Championship, Boulton was drawn to play three-time women's world finalist Deta Hedman in the first round. He defeated Hedman 3–2, reaching the second round of the competition for the first time. He was eliminated after losing to Stephen Bunting. The same year, Boulton switched his allegiance from England to Scotland on residency grounds after previously living in England for many years.

After losing his Tour Card again at the end of 2022, Boulton saw success on the PDC Challenge Tour. He won two titles on the 2023 Challenge Tour at event 3 and event 23. On 16 March 2024, Boulton claimed two Challenge Tour titles on the same day, winning events 8 and 9.

Boulton won his Tour Card back at 2025 Q-School after finishing eighth on the UK Q-School Order of Merit.

== World Championship performances ==
=== BDO ===
- 2008: Second round (lost to Ted Hankey 1–4)
- 2011: First round (lost to Robbie Green 0–3)
- 2012: First round (lost to Scott Waites 1–3)

=== PDC ===
- 2016: First round (lost to Gary Anderson 0–3)
- 2020: First round (lost to Danny Baggish 2–3)
- 2021: Second round (lost to Stephen Bunting 2–3)

== Performance timeline ==
=== BDO ===
Tournament	2006	2008	2009	2010	2011	2012	2013	2014
BDO Ranked televised events
World Championship	DNP	2R	DNQ		1R	1R	DNQ	
World Masters	5R	3R	4R	4R	4R	5R	4R	5R

=== PDC ===
Tournament	2005	2009	2011	2013	2014	2015	2016	2017	2019	2020	2021	2022	2024	2025	2026
PDC Ranked televised events
World Championship	BDO						1R	DNQ		1R	2R	Did not qualify			
World Masters	Not held			Did not qualify										Prel.	Prel.
UK Open	3R	2R	5R	3R	3R	2R	3R	DNQ	3R	5R	4R	4R	1R	2R	4R
Grand Slam	NH	Did not qualify				RR	Did not qualify								
Players Championship Finals	NH	Did not qualify						1R	1R	2R	2R	Did not qualify			
Career statistics
Year-end ranking (PDC)	-	-	-	-	-	72	58	62	81	51	56	82	116	114	

==== PDC European Tour ====
Season	1	2	3	4	5	6	7	8	9	10	11	12	13
2015	GDC; 2R	GDT; DNQ	GDM; 1R	Did not qualify									
2016	Did not qualify					EDO; 2R	IDO; 1R	EDT; 1R	EDG; 1R	GDC; 1R			
2017	Did not qualify									GDG; 1R	IDO; DNQ	EDT; QF	
2018	Did not qualify				EDG; 1R	DDM; DNQ	GDT; 3R	DDO; DNQ	EDM; SF	GDC; 1R	DDC; 1R	IDO; DNQ	EDT; DNQ
2019	EDO; DNQ	GDC; 2R	Did not qualify				DDM; 1R	Did not qualify				IDO; 1R	GDT; DNQ
2020	BDC; 1R	Did not qualify											
2022	IDO; 1R	Did not qualify						DDC; 1R	Did not qualify				
2023	BSD; DNQ	EDO; 2R	IDO; 1R	GDG; 1R	ADO; DNQ	DDC; 1R	Did not qualify					HDT; 1R	GDC; DNQ
2025	Did not qualify			GDG; 1R	Did not qualify								

==== PDC Players Championships ====
Season	1	2	3	4	5	6	7	8	9	10	11	12	13	14	15	16	17	18	19	20	21	22	23	24	25	26	27	28	29	30	31	32	33	34
2015	BAR; 1R	BAR; 2R	BAR; 1R	BAR; 3R	BAR; 1R	COV; QF	COV; 1R	COV; 1R	CRA; 2R	CRA; 2R	BAR; 3R	BAR; 2R	WIG; DNP		BAR; 1R	BAR; 3R	DUB; 4R	DUB; 3R	COV; 3R	COV; 1R														
2016	BAR; 1R	BAR; 1R	BAR; 2R	BAR; 1R	BAR; 1R	BAR; 1R	BAR; 1R	COV; 2R	COV; 2R	BAR; 3R	BAR; 1R	BAR; 1R	BAR; 1R	BAR; 2R	BAR; 1R	BAR; 1R	DUB; 3R	DUB; 1R	BAR; 2R	BAR; 1R														
2017	BAR; 2R	BAR; 1R	BAR; 1R	BAR; 1R	MIL; 1R	MIL; 2R	BAR; 3R	BAR; 1R	WIG; 1R	WIG; 1R	MIL; SF	MIL; 3R	WIG; 2R	WIG; 1R	BAR; 2R	BAR; 3R	BAR; 1R	BAR; 2R	DUB; 2R	DUB; 1R	BAR; 2R	BAR; 2R												
2018 (Note: Not a Tour card holder)	Did not participate																	BAR; 3R	DUB; DNP	DUB; 2R	BAR; DNP													
2019	WIG; 1R	WIG; 2R	WIG; 4R	WIG; 2R	BAR; 3R	BAR; 2R	WIG; 2R	WIG; QF	BAR; 1R	BAR; 2R	BAR; QF	BAR; 1R	BAR; 2R	BAR; 1R	BAR; 1R	BAR; 2R	WIG; 2R	WIG; 4R	BAR; 3R	BAR; 1R	HIL; 2R	HIL; 3R	BAR; 1R	BAR; 1R	BAR; 4R	BAR; QF	DUB; 2R	DUB; 2R	BAR; 1R	BAR; 3R				
2020	BAR; 1R	BAR; 1R	WIG; 2R	WIG; 1R	WIG; 1R	WIG; 1R	BAR; 1R	BAR; 1R	MIL; 2R	MIL; 2R	MIL; 1R	MIL; 2R	MIL; 1R	NIE; 2R	NIE; 4R	NIE; 2R	NIE; 3R	NIE; 2R	COV; 3R	COV; 2R	COV; 3R	COV; 1R	COV; SF											
2021	BOL; 1R	BOL; 3R	BOL; 1R	BOL; 2R	MIL; 3R	MIL; 2R	MIL; 1R	MIL; 1R	NIE; 2R	NIE; 2R	NIE; SF	NIE; 2R	MIL; 1R	MIL; 2R	MIL; 1R	MIL; 2R	COV; 2R	COV; 2R	COV; 1R	COV; 1R	BAR; 2R	BAR; 1R	BAR; 3R	BAR; 1R	BAR; 1R	BAR; 1R	BAR; 1R	BAR; 1R	BAR; 3R	BAR; 2R				
2022	BAR; 3R	BAR; 2R	WIG; 2R	WIG; 2R	BAR; 1R	BAR; 1R	NIE; 2R	NIE; 1R	BAR; 3R	BAR; 2R	BAR; 2R	BAR; 2R	BAR; 3R	WIG; 2R	WIG; 2R	NIE; 1R	NIE; 2R	BAR; 3R	BAR; 3R	BAR; 4R	BAR; 1R	BAR; 1R	BAR; 1R	BAR; 1R	BAR; 1R	BAR; 2R	BAR; 1R	BAR; 1R	BAR; 1R	BAR; 2R				
2023	BAR; DNP		BAR; 2R	BAR; 3R	BAR; 1R	BAR; 1R	HIL; 2R	HIL; 4R	WIG; 3R	WIG; 1R	LEI; DNP		HIL; 2R	HIL; 3R	LEI; 1R	LEI; 1R	HIL; 1R	HIL; 2R	BAR; 2R	BAR; 1R	BAR; 1R	BAR; 1R	BAR; 3R	BAR; 1R	BAR; 2R	BAR; 3R	BAR; 3R	BAR; 1R	BAR; 1R	BAR; 2R				
2024	Did not participate						LEI; 1R	LEI; 1R	HIL; 1R	HIL; 1R	HIL; 1R	HIL; 3R	MIL; SF	MIL; 1R	MIL; 1R	MIL; 3R	MIL; 2R	MIL; 2R	MIL; 1R	WIG; 2R	WIG; 2R	LEI; 1R	LEI; 3R	WIG; 1R	WIG; 2R	WIG; 3R	WIG; 1R	WIG; 1R	LEI; 1R	LEI; 2R				
2025	WIG; 1R	WIG; 1R	ROS; 2R	ROS; 3R	LEI; 2R	LEI; 1R	HIL; 2R	HIL; 1R	LEI; 1R	LEI; 3R	LEI; 2R	LEI; 1R	ROS; 2R	ROS; 2R	HIL; 1R	HIL; 2R	LEI; 2R	LEI; 1R	LEI; 1R	HIL; 3R	HIL; 1R	MIL; 1R	MIL; 2R	MIL; 1R	HIL; 2R	HIL; 3R	LEI; 2R	LEI; 2R	LEI; 2R	WIG; 1R	WIG; 3R	WIG; 2R	WIG; 3R	WIG; 1R
2026	HIL; 2R	HIL; 1R	WIG; 2R	WIG; 1R	LEI; 2R	LEI; 1R	LEI; 1R	LEI; 2R	WIG; 1R	WIG; 1R	MIL; 1R	MIL; 3R	HIL; 2R	HIL; 2R	LEI; 4R	LEI; 4R	LEI; 1R	LEI; 2R	MIL; 1R	MIL; QF	WIG; 1R	WIG; 1R	LEI; 3R	LEI; 1R	HIL; 1R	HIL; 2R	LEI; 1R	LEI; 4R	ROS; 1R	ROS; 1R	ROS; 1R	ROS; 2R	LEI; 1R	LEI; 1R

Performance Table Legend
W	Won the tournament	F	Finalist	SF	Semifinalist	QF	Quarterfinalist	#R; RR; Prel.	Lost in # round Round-robin; Preliminary round	DQ	Disqualified
DNQ	Did not qualify	DNP	Did not participate	WD	Withdrew	NH	Tournament not held	#R; RR; Prel.	Lost in # round Round-robin; Preliminary round	NYF	Not yet founded
