= Jamie Lewis =

Jamie Lewis may refer to:

- Jamie Lewis (darts player), Welsh darts player
- Jamie Lewis (gymnast), English gymnast
