= 2022 Dutch Darts Championship =

2022 edition of Dutch Darts Championship

2022 Jack's Dutch Darts Championship

Tournament information
- Dates: 27–29 May 2022
- Venue: IJsselhallen
- Location: Zwolle, Netherlands
- Organisation(s): Professional Darts Corporation (PDC)
- Format: Legs
- Prize fund: £140,000
- Winner's share: £25,000
- High checkout: 170; Dave Chisnall; Andrew Gilding; Jelle Klaasen

Champion(s)
- Michael Smith (ENG)

The 2022 Dutch Darts Championship (known for sponsorship reasons as the 2022 Jack's Dutch Darts Championship) was the eighth of thirteen PDC European Tour events on the 2022 PDC Pro Tour. The tournament took place at the IJsselhallen, Zwolle, Netherlands, from 27 to 29 May 2022. It featured a field of 48 players and £140,000 in prize money, with £25,000 going to the winner.

Ian White was the defending champion after defeating Ricky Evans 8–5 in the 2018 final, but he failed to qualify for the tournament.

Michael Smith won the tournament, his fifth European Tour title and first since 2017, with an 8–7 win over Danny Noppert.

== Prize money ==
The prize money was unchanged from the European Tours of the last 3 years:

Stage (num. of players)		Prize money
Winner	(1)	£25,000
Runner-up	(1)	£10,000
Semi-finalists	(2)	£6,500
Quarter-finalists	(4)	£5,000
Third round losers	(8)	£3,000
Second round losers	(16)	£2,000*
First round losers	(16)	£1,000*
Total	£140,000	

- Seeded players who lose in the second round and host nation qualifiers (who qualify automatically as a result of their ranking) who lose in their first match of the event shall not be credited with prize money on any Order of Merit. A player who qualifies as a qualifier, but later becomes a seed due to the withdrawal of one or more other players shall be credited with their prize money on all Orders of Merit regardless of how far they progress in the event.

== Qualification and format ==
The top 16 entrants from the PDC ProTour Order of Merit on 30 April automatically qualified for the event and were seeded in the second round.

The remaining 32 places went to players from six qualifying events – 24 from the Tour Card Holder Qualifier (held on 9 May), two from the Associate Member Qualifier (held on 24 April), the two highest ProTour ranking Dutch players, two from the Host Nation Qualifier (held on 26 May), one from the Nordic & Baltic Associate Member Qualifier (held on 20 February), and one from the East European Associate Member Qualifier (held on 24 April).

Luke Humphries was due to participate as the fifth seed but withdrew due to a personal commitment. As a result, Chris Dobey became a seed and an additional place was made available at the Host Nation Qualifier.

Jim Williams withdrew on the morning of the first day, as he missed his flight to the Netherlands, so Ritchie Edhouse received a bye into the second round.

The following players took part in the tournament:

Top 16

1. Gerwyn Price (second round)
2. Michael van Gerwen (third round)
3. Peter Wright (third round)
4. Ryan Searle (third round)
5. José de Sousa (second round)
6. Rob Cross (second round)
7. Joe Cullen (second round)
8. Damon Heta (third round)
9. Michael Smith (champion)
10. Nathan Aspinall (second round)
11. Dimitri Van den Bergh (second round)
12. Dirk van Duijvenbode (quarter-finals)
13. Krzysztof Ratajski (second round)
14. Martin Schindler (second round)
15. Brendan Dolan (second round)
16. Chris Dobey (third round)

Tour Card Qualifier
- Ryan Meikle (third round)
- Boris Krčmar (quarter-finals)
- Dave Chisnall (third round)
- Mervyn King (quarter-finals)
- Connor Scutt (first round)
- Jermaine Wattimena (second round)
- Scott Waites (second round)
- Mario Vandenbogaerde (first round)
- Andy Boulton (first round)
- Callan Rydz (semi-finals)
- Simon Whitlock (quarter-finals)
- Kevin Burness (first round)
- Martijn Kleermaker (first round)
- ~~Jim Williams~~ (withdrew)
- Ritchie Edhouse (second round)
- Ross Smith (second round)
- Mickey Mansell (second round)
- Madars Razma (first round)
- Danny Jansen (second round)
- Jamie Hughes (first round)
- Andrew Gilding (semi-finals)
- Steve Lennon (first round)
- Niels Zonneveld (first round)

Associate Member Qualifier
- Stefan Bellmont (first round)
- René Eidams (first round)

Highest Ranked Dutchmen
- Danny Noppert (runner-up)
- Vincent van der Voort (first round)

Host Nation Qualifier
- Arjan Konterman (first round)
- Jelle Klaasen (second round)
- Wesley Plaisier (first round)

Nordic & Baltic Qualifier
- Daniel Larsson (third round)

East European Qualifier
- Sebastian Białecki (first round)

== Draw ==
First round (best of 11 legs); 27 May
Stefan Bellmont 84.02	4
Mervyn King 86.46	6
Jim Williams	w/d
Ritchie Edhouse	w/o
Connor Scutt 80.60	4
Scott Waites 83.56	6
Danny Jansen 86.63	6
Vincent van der Voort 89.83	5
Kevin Burness 84.00	1
Ross Smith 88.59	6
Andrew Gilding 99.33	6
Wesley Plaisier 95.17	4
Dave Chisnall 97.01	6
Madars Razma 91.55	2
Mickey Mansell 94.55	6
Niels Zonneveld 97.69	5
Sebastian Białecki 82.50	1
Jelle Klaasen 88.57	6
Martijn Kleermaker 78.08	3
Callan Rydz 85.22	6
Simon Whitlock 99.52	6
Jamie Hughes 92.95	3
Daniel Larsson 88.18	6
Mario Vandenbogaerde 85.70	1
Jermaine Wattimena 85.91	6
René Eidams 80.26	3
Danny Noppert 96.97	6
Arjan Konterman 92.70	0
Andy Boulton 92.80	1
Ryan Meikle 96.86	6
Boris Krčmar 99.02	6
Steve Lennon 97.70	5

Second round (best of 11 legs); 28 May
1	Gerwyn Price 89.79	5
Mervyn King 91.69	6
16	Chris Dobey 97.77	6
Ritchie Edhouse 88.92	1
8	Damon Heta 85.47	6
Scott Waites 89.94	3
9	Michael Smith 105.79	6
Danny Jansen 93.44	4
4	Ryan Searle 94.23	6
Ross Smith 90.20	3
13	Krzysztof Ratajski 97.23	4
Andrew Gilding 98.27	6
5	José de Sousa 95.78	3
Dave Chisnall 105.89	6
12	Dirk van Duijvenbode 97.14	6
Mickey Mansell 92.70	4
2	Michael van Gerwen 104.67	6
Jelle Klaasen 98.05	2
15	Brendan Dolan 85.37	1
Callan Rydz 90.39	6
7	Joe Cullen 92.81	5
Simon Whitlock 97.55	6
10	Nathan Aspinall 90.08	4
Daniel Larsson 91.09	6
3	Peter Wright 92.77	6
Jermaine Wattimena 86.34	3
14	Martin Schindler 100.48	5
Danny Noppert 98.16	6
6	Rob Cross 98.61	2
Ryan Meikle 100.75	6
11	Dimitri Van den Bergh 95.39	5
Boris Krčmar 96.71	6

Third round (best of 11 legs); 29 May
King 87.81	6
16	Dobey 91.81	1
8	Heta 102.94	3
9	M. Smith 111.10	6
4	Searle 98.32	4
Gilding 98.64	6
Chisnall 105.52	5
12	van Duijvenbode 103.39	6
2	van Gerwen 90.93	4
Rydz 91.58	6
Whitlock 88.40	6
Larsson 82.77	1
3	Wright 96.33	5
Noppert 103.16	6
Meikle 86.13	4
Krčmar 91.06	6

Quarter-finals (best of 11 legs); 29 May
King 96.48	4
9	M. Smith 95.75	6
Gilding 104.28	6
12	van Duijvenbode 101.17	3
Rydz 92.20	6
Whitlock 88.07	3
Noppert 93.05	6
Krčmar 90.18	5

Semi-finals (best of 13 legs); 29 May
9	M. Smith 98.42	7
Gilding 95.12	4
Rydz 76.17	2
Noppert 103.15	7

Final (best of 15 legs); 29 May
9	M. Smith 99.44	8
Noppert 96.78	7
