= Wesley Plaisier =

Dutch darts player (born 1990)

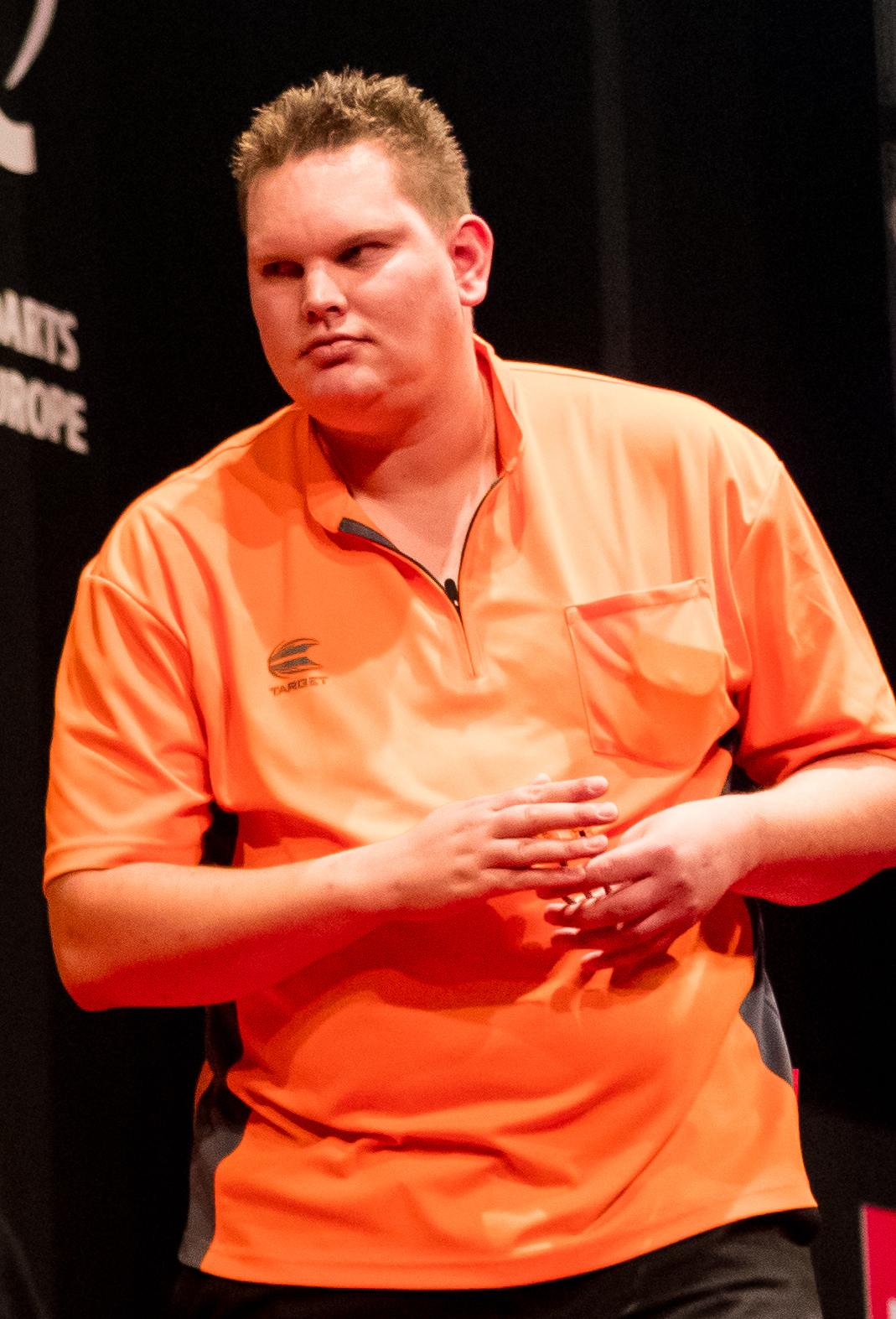
- Plaisier in 2019

Personal information
- Born: 4 March 1990 (age 36) Hendrik-Ido-Ambacht, Netherlands

Sport
- Sport: Darts
- Playing since: 2010
- Darts: 24g Harrows
- Laterality: Right-handed
- Walk-on music: "Angels" by Robbie Williams

Organisation (see split in darts)
- BDO: 2014–2019
- PDC: 2019–present (Tour Card: 2025–present)
- WDF: 2019–2024
- Current world ranking: (PDC) 70 (5 November 2026)

WDF major events – best performances
- World Championship: Quarter-final: 2023
- World Masters: Winner (2): 2022, 2024
- Dutch Open: Runner-up: 2024

PDC premier events – best performances
- World Championship: Last 32: 2026
- UK Open: Last 96: 2024
- PC Finals: Last 32: 2024
- Masters: Prem. Round: 2026

Other tournament wins
- Years
Antwerp Open	2023
Belgium Open	2022, 2024
PDC Challenge Tour	2022, 2023, 2024 (x2)
Six Nations Cup	2022
Players Championships
2024 PC28
Medal record
Men's Darts
Representing Netherlands
WDF World Cup
Gold medal – first place	2023 Esbjerg	Men's team
Gold medal – first place	2023 Esbjerg	Men's overall
WDF Europe Cup
Silver medal – second place	2022 Gandía	Men's team
Silver medal – second place	2022 Gandía	Men's overall
Silver medal – second place	2024 Šamorín	Men's overall
Bronze medal – third place	2024 Šamorín	Men's team

Wesley Plaisier (born 4 March 1990) is a Dutch professional darts player who competes in Professional Darts Corporation (PDC) events. He previously participated in World Darts Federation (WDF) tournaments, winning the World Masters twice. He finished as the runner-up at the 2024 Dutch Open. He reached the quarter-finals at the 2023 WDF Lakeside World Championship.

Plaisier won 4 titles on the PDC Challenge Tour and became the fourth player to win a PDC ranking title without being a PDC Tour Card holder by winning 2024 Players Championship 28. He gained a Tour Card for the first time through his placing on the 2024 Challenge Tour ranking.

== Career ==
=== 2019 ===
Plaisier attended European Q-School in 2019, but never got further than the last 32, missing out on a Tour Card. He did then qualify as one of the Association Member qualifiers for the 2019 European Darts Open in Leverkusen, Germany. He lost 6–3 to James Wade in the second round.

He also qualified for the 2019 Dutch Darts Masters, but he lost 6–1 to Brendan Dolan. A third European Tour qualification of 2019 was secured at the 2019 European Darts Matchplay, but Jamie Hughes beat him 6–5.

=== 2022 ===
Plaisier performed well at the 2022 German Darts Grand Prix, beating Jim Williams, Joe Cullen and Dirk van Duijvenbode to reach the quarter-final stage, where he was beaten in a deciding leg by the tournament's eventual winner, Luke Humphries.

Plaiser won the 2022 Six Nations Charity Singles beating Scott Taylor in the final 5–4.

Plaisier won the 2022 World Masters, defeating Barry Copeland 7–2 in the final. He became the first Dutch player to win the event since Michael van Gerwen in 2006.

=== 2023 ===
Plaisier qualified for the 2023 German Darts Open. In the tournament he defeated George Killington 6–4 in the first round, Ross Smith 6–2 in the second round, Luke Humphries 6–5 in the third round and Brian Raman 6–3 in the quarters. Stephen Bunting won the semi final 7–6.

=== 2024 ===
Plaisier competed in the 2024 PDC Challenge Tour series, the secondary tier of the 2024 PDC Pro Tour. He reached the final of Challenge Tour 10 (CT10), being whitewashed 5–0 by Lee Cocks. Plaisier then reached the final in back to back events at Challenge Tours 15 and 16. Plaisier won the former, defeating Damian Mol 5–4 in a deciding leg and lost the latter final 5–3 to Alexander Merkx. Plaisier reached another final at event 19, defeating Lee Cocks 5–3 in the final to win his fourth Challenge Tour event in his career.

Plaisier received call–ups for 2024 PDC Players Championship series events filling in as a reserve for an absent tour card holder virtue of his ranking on the Challenge Tour Order of Merit. Plaisier reached the final at events 13, 14 and 28. At PC13 Plaisier lost the final to Ross Smith 8–7. At PC14 he lost the final to Jonny Clayton 8–5. At PC28 Plaisier defeated Josh Rock 8–7 in the final, surviving six missed match darts from Rock. This meant he became the fourth player to win a Players Championship event without being a PDC Tour Card holder.

Plaisier finished second in the 2024 PDC Challenge Tour Order of Merit which granted him a two-year PDC Tour Card for the first time in his career.

In the World Darts Federation (WDF), Plaisier retained the World Masters title that he won in 2022 with a 7–3 win over Kai Gotthardt in the final.

=== 2025 ===
Plaisier qualified for the 2025 PDC World Darts Championship, making his debut in the tournament. He won his first round match 3–1 against Ryusei Azemoto but lost to Peter Wright 3–1 in the second round.

== World Championship results ==
=== WDF ===
- 2023: Quarter-finals (lost to Dennis Nilsson 1–4)

=== PDC ===
- 2025: Second round (lost to Peter Wright 1–3)
- 2026: Third round (lost to Krzysztof Ratajski 3–4)

== Career finals ==
=== WDF major/platinum finals: 2 (2 titles) ===
Legend
World Masters (2–0)

Outcome	No.	Year	Championship	Opponent in the final	Score (Note: (l) = score in legs, (s) = score in sets, (m) = matches won.)
Winner	1.	2022	World Masters (1)	(Northern Ireland) Barry Copeland	7–2 (l)
Winner	2.	2024	World Masters (2)	(Germany) Kai Gotthardt	7–3 (l)

== Performance timeline ==
WDF

Tournament	2022	2023	2024
WDF Major/platinum events
World Championship	DNP	QF	PDC
World Masters	W	NH	W

PDC

Tournament	2022	2023	2024	2025	2026
PDC Ranked televised events
World Championship	DNQ			2R	3R
World Masters	DNQ				Prel.
UK Open	1R	DNP	3R	1R	2R
Players Championship Finals	DNQ		2R	1R	
Career statistics
Season-end ranking (PDC)	113	133	68	75	

PDC European Tour

Season	1	2	3	4	5	6	7	8	9	10	11	12	13	14
2019	EDO; 2R	Did not qualify					DDM; 1R	DNQ			EDM; 1R	DNQ		
2020	BDC; 2R	Did not qualify												
2022	IDO; DNP	GDC; DNQ	GDG; QF	ADO; 2R	Did not qualify				EDM; 3R	DNQ			GDT; 3R	
2023	Did not qualify										GDO; SF	DNQ		
2025	Did not qualify						DDC; 1R	Did not qualify						GDC; 1R

=== PDC Players Championships ===
Season	1	2	3	4	5	6	7	8	9	10	11	12	13	14	15	16	17	18	19	20	21	22	23	24	25	26	27	28	29	30	31	32	33	34
2022 (Note: Not a Tour card holder)	Did not participate																								BAR; 2R	BAR; 1R	BAR; 2R	BAR; 3R	DNP					
2023	Did not participate																HIL; 1R	HIL; 3R	Did not participate						BAR; 1R	BAR; 2R	BAR; 2R	BAR; 1R	BAR; 3R	BAR; 2R				
2024	DNP				HIL; 1R	HIL; 1R	DNP		HIL; 1R	HIL; 1R	HIL; 2R	HIL; 3R	MIL; F	MIL; F	MIL; 1R	MIL; 4R	MIL; 1R	MIL; 3R	MIL; 3R	WIG; 2R	WIG; 1R	DNP		WIG; 1R	WIG; 1R	WIG; 1R	WIG; 1R	WIG; W	LEI; 1R	LEI; 3R				
2025	WIG; 1R	WIG; 2R	ROS; 1R	ROS; 3R	LEI; 2R	LEI; 1R	HIL; 1R	HIL; 1R	LEI; 1R	LEI; 1R	LEI; 2R	LEI; 3R	ROS; 2R	ROS; 2R	HIL; 2R	HIL; 1R	LEI; 1R	LEI; 3R	LEI; DNP	LEI; 1R	LEI; QF	HIL; 4R	HIL; 1R	MIL; 1R	MIL; 3R	HIL; 1R	HIL; 2R	LEI; 1R	LEI; 3R	LEI; SF	WIG; 3R	WIG; 1R	WIG; 1R	WIG; 2R
2026	HIL; 4R	HIL; 2R	WIG; 1R	WIG; 1R	LEI; 2R	LEI; 2R	LEI; 1R	LEI; 4R	WIG; 2R	WIG; 2R	MIL; 1R	MIL; 1R	HIL; 1R	HIL; 1R	LEI; 1R	LEI; 1R	LEI; 1R	LEI; 1R	MIL; 2R	MIL; 2R	WIG; 1R	WIG; 3R	LEI; 4R	LEI; 1R	HIL; 2R	HIL; 2R	HIL; 3R	HIL; 3R	ROS; 2R	ROS; 1R	ROS; 2R	ROS; 4R	LEI; 2R	LEI; 1R

Performance Table Legend
W	Won the tournament	F	Finalist	SF	Semifinalist	QF	Quarterfinalist	#R; RR; Prel.	Lost in # round Round-robin; Preliminary round	DQ	Disqualified
DNQ	Did not qualify	DNP	Did not participate	WD	Withdrew	NH	Tournament not held	#R; RR; Prel.	Lost in # round Round-robin; Preliminary round	NYF	Not yet founded
