= 2020 Dutch Open (darts) =

Dutch Open

Tournament information
- Dates: 31 January – 2 February 2020
- Venue: De Bonte Wever
- Location: Assen
- Country: Netherlands
- Organisation(s): WDF
- Format: Legs; Sets (only in men's semi-finals and final)
- Prize fund: €27,650 (total)
- Winner's share: €5,000 (men's) €2,500 (women's)

Champion(s)
- Ross Montgomery (men's); Aileen de Graaf (women's); Mark Tabak (youth's); Lerena Rietbergen (girls)

The 2020 Dutch Open (officially referred to as the 2020 Bauhaus Dutch Open) was the 48th edition of the Dutch Open organised by the World Darts Federation and Nederlandse Darts Bond (Dutch Darts Association). The tournament was held at the De Bonte Wever in Assen, Netherlands. Tournament has been awarded Platinum ranking status, with a total prize fund €27,650.

On 29 November 2019, Nederlandse Darts Bond received a letter from the British Darts Organisation with several new obligations to tournament regulations. The Nederlandse Darts Bond does not accept the new rules and is not going to pay for BDO points. Since 2020 tournament is no longer BDO ranked.

Ross Montgomery and Aileen de Graaf won men's and women's tournaments respectively. This edition was biggest darts open tournament in 2020, where over 5 thousand players took part. Montgomery claimed the men's singles title with a 3–1 win over Brian Raman, lifting the trophy for the second time in his career.

== Men's ==
=== Draw ===
Eighth round (best of 7 legs); 2 February
Martin Atkins	4
Erik van Manen	0
Wayne Warren 83.24	4
Daniel Bakker 80.48	2
Heine Uuldriks	4
Nigel van Milligen	3
Dave Parletti 91.78	4
Jeffrey Sparidaans 79.90	2
Richard Veenstra 89.63	4
Maikel Venema 80.68	2
John Desreumaux	4
Peter Langeveld	2
Aleksei Kadochnikov	4
Moreno Blom	1
Ross Montgomery 93.61	4
Stefan Martena 65.77	1
Mario Vandenbogaerde	4
Jordan de Grunt	2
Andy Baetens	4
Dirk van Duijvenbode	1
Arjan Konterman	4
Jan de Weerdt	2
Brian Raman	4
Roemer Mooijman	2
Paul Hogan	4
Lukas Wenig	0
Willem Mandigers 85.44	4
Danny de Bie 76.53	2
Jim Williams	4
Roger van de Putte	0
Sam Coenders	4
Max Gras	2

Ninth round (best of 7 legs); 2 February
Martin Atkins 84.64	2
Wayne Warren 86.63	4
Heine Uuldriks 89.45	2
Dave Parletti 102.76	4
Richard Veenstra 80.69	3
John Desreumaux 76.04	4
Aleksei Kadochnikov 87.57	0
Ross Montgomery 92.49	4
Mario Vandenbogaerde	3
Andy Baetens	4
Arjan Konterman	2
Brian Raman	4
Paul Hogan 93.74	4
Willem Mandigers 83.86	3
Jim Williams	4
Sam Coenders	1

Quarter-finals (best of 9 legs); 2 February
Wayne Warren 98.00	5
Dave Parletti 84.17	1
John Desreumaux 74.36	3
Ross Montgomery 88.35	5
Andy Baetens 84.70	4
Brian Raman 91.58	5
Paul Hogan 85.85	5
Jim Williams 91.06	4

Semi-finals (best of 3 sets); 2 February
Wayne Warren 86.98	1
Ross Montgomery 91.57	2
Brian Raman 87.14	2
Paul Hogan 87.32	0

Final (best of 5 sets); 2 February
Ross Montgomery 87.41	3
Brian Raman 88.08	1

== Women's ==
=== Draw ===
Fourth round (best of 5 legs); 2 February
Floortje van Zanten	3
Ria Niemeijer	1
Layla Brussel	3
Anna Hlavova	2
Maria O'Brien	3
Chris Savvery	1
Lorraine Winstanley 75.25	3
Mandy Smith 64.18	2
Marjolein Noijens	3
Tessa Hollander	2
Anca Zijlstra	3
Margaret Sutton	0
Irina Armstrong	3
Lena Zollikofer	1
Caitlin Klein-Stavast	3
Paula Jacklin	2
Deta Hedman	3
Agnes den Breejen	0
Lerena Rietbergen	3
Evelien van Tol	0
Kirsty Hutchinson	3
Jana Kanovska	2
Anita van der Velde	3
Astrid Trouwborst	2
Priscilla Steenbergen	3
Leonie Beekman	2
Femke van Zuiden	3
Sharon Prins	2
Melanie Vermaas	3
Romy Vermeulen	1
Aileen de Graaf	3
Olga Hoogenkamp	1

Fifth round (best of 7 legs); 2 February
Floortje van Zanten	4
Layla Brussel	2
Maria O'Brien 83.42	4
Lorraine Winstanley 86.00	2
Marjolein Noijens	2
Anca Zijlstra	4
Irina Armstrong	4
Caitlin Klein-Stavast	0
Deta Hedman	4
Lerena Rietbergen	1
Kirsty Hutchinson	4
Anita van der Velde	0
Priscilla Steenbergen	4
Femke van Zuiden	1
Melanie Vermaas	0
Aileen de Graaf	4

Quarter-finals (best of 7 legs); 2 February
Floortje van Zanten 56.39	0
Maria O'Brien 68.32	4
Anca Zijlstra	4
Irina Armstrong	0
Deta Hedman	4
Kirsty Hutchinson	2
Priscilla Steenbergen 73.96	1
Aileen de Graaf 83.90	4

Semi-finals (best of 7 legs); 2 February
Maria O'Brien 55.75	1
Anca Zijlstra 55.62	4
Deta Hedman 78.31	1
Aileen de Graaf 83.09	4

Final (best of 9 legs); 2 February
Anca Zijlstra 68.46	2
Aileen de Graaf 71.52	5

== Youth's ==
=== Seeds ===
Seeding was take place in accordance of the WDF Rankings. The players was seeded in accordance with WDF regulations, but not always as the first match in the section. The first byes go to the seeded players, but after that the byes are equally divided across the sheets in a random place on the sheet.

1. Daan Bastiaansen
2. Danny Jansen
3. Owen Roelofs
4. Justin Dekker

=== Draw ===
Quarter-finals (best of 5 legs); 2 February
1	Daan Bastiaansen	3
Pim van Bijnen	1
Marcel Bus	3
Keanu van Velzen	0
Mark Tabak	3
Charlie Stocks	1
Luke van der Kwast	3
Owen Roelofs	0

Semi-finals (best of 5 legs); 2 February
1	Daan Bastiaansen	0
Marcel Bus	3
Mark Tabak	3
Luke van der Kwast	2

Final (best of 7 legs); 2 February
Marcel Bus 56.07	1
Mark Tabak 63.06	4

== Girls ==
=== Seeds ===
Seeding was take place in accordance of the WDF Rankings. The players was seeded in accordance with WDF regulations, but not always as the first match in the section. The first byes go to the seeded players, but after that the byes are equally divided across the sheets in a random place on the sheet.

1. Lerena Rietbergen (Champion)
2. Chloe O'Brien (Semi-finals)

=== Draw ===
Quarter-finals (best of 5 legs); 2 February
1	Lerena Rietbergen	3
Jaynie Wink	2
Aranka van der Waals	3
Joella Verhagen	1
2	Chloe O'Brien	3
Cheyenne Doddema	2
Layla Brussel	3
Kyenta Ysewijn	0

Semi-finals (best of 5 legs); 2 February
1	Lerena Rietbergen	3
Aranka van der Waals	2
2	Chloe O'Brien	2
Layla Brussel	3

Final (best of 5 legs); 2 February
1	Lerena Rietbergen 46.78	3
Layla Brussel 47.06	1
