= Francesco Raschini =

Italian darts player

Personal information
- Full name: Francesco Raschini
- Nickname: "Rosko"
- Born: 9 June 1977 (age 49) Serrapetrona, Italy
- Home town: Serrapetrona, Italy

Sport
- Sport: Darts
- Playing since: 2010
- Darts: 23g Target
- Laterality: Right-handed
- Walk-on music: "It's A Long Way To The Top" by AC/DC

Organisation (see split in darts)
- BDO: 2010–2020
- WDF: 2010–
- Current world ranking: (WDF) 167 ▼10 (17 August 2026)

WDF major events – best performances
- World Championship: Last 48: 2022
- World Masters: Last 128: 2022
- Dutch Open: Last 64: 2022

Francesco Raschini (born 9 June 1977) is an Italian professional darts player who currently plays in World Darts Federation (WDF) events. He is the first Italian player who played in the World Darts Championship.

== Career ==
Raschini was only seen competing in the Italian Grand Masters from 2010 to 2016. His best result there is a quarter-finals in 2011. In 2016, he took part in the Malta Open, which he ended in the Last 32 phase. A few weeks later, he started in qualifying for the BDO World Darts Championship, organized a few days before the 2016 Winmau World Masters. In this tournament he lost in second round match to Bradley Kirk by 0–3 in sets.

Since 2019, Raschini has been seen at significantly more tournaments. So he registered for the PDC Q-School, but stayed far away from a tour card. In the following months, he also traveled to World Darts Federation tournaments throughout Europe and reached the Last 16 phase at the Helvetia Open and French Open. Raschini also participated at the 2019 World Masters and lost in the second round to Paul Hogan by 0–3 in sets. In 2020, he make a best results to date, achieved a semi-final in the Slovak Masters.

In 2021, he collected a lot of points, in particular by participating in the quarter-finals of the Hungarian Masters and reaching Last 32 phase at the Denmark Open and Irish Open. Raschini also increased his points account with the quarter-finals at the Slovenia Open, Catalonia Open, Italian Open and Italian Grand Masters, which allowed him to start in the 2022 WDF World Darts Championship. He made his Lakeside debut against Ryan de Vreede and lost 1–2 in sets.

In 2022, he took part in several international tournaments, but without much success. In June, he took part in the 2022 Dutch Open when he lost in the sixth round match to Arjan Konterman by 3–4 in legs.

== World Championship results ==
=== WDF ===
- 2022: First round (lost to Ryan de Vreede 1–2) (sets)

== Performance timeline ==
Tournament	2016	2017	2018	2019	2020	2021	2022	2023
WDF Ranked televised events
World Championship	DNQ					NH	1R	
World Masters	2R	DNQ		2R	NH		2R	
Dutch Open	DNP						6R	
