= Hungarian Classic =

Tournament information
- Venue: Honved Sportcenter
- Location: Budapest
- Country: Hungary
- Established: 1999
- Organisation(s): WDF
- Format: Legs

Current champion(s)
- Jimmy van Schie (men's); Jitka Císařová (women's); Kendji Steinbach (boys); Sophie McKinlay (girls)

The Hungarian Classic (previously called Hungarian Open) is a darts tournament held in Budapest, Hungary. Tournament was sanctioned by the World Darts Federation. The event has been organized every year since 1999. Three editions of this tournament were held in Győr. Hungarian Classic is a part of the Hungarian Masters weekend.

The first winners were Levente Székely and Kristina Pruim.

== List of tournaments ==
=== Men's ===
Year	Champion	Av.	Score	Runner-Up	Av.	Prize Money			Venue
Year	Champion	Av.	Score	Runner-Up	Av.	Total	Ch.	R.-Up	Venue
1999	(Hungary) Levente Székely	n/a	beat	(Hungary) Robert Koch	n/a	–	–	–	Budapest
2000	(Belgium) Rudi Minnebach	n/a	beat	(Austria) Jerome Zeleny	n/a	–	–	–	Budapest
2001	(Sweden) Anders Larsson	n/a	beat	(Netherlands) Albertino Essers	n/a	–	–	–	Budapest
2002	(Austria) Franz Thaler	n/a	beat	(Hungary) Attila Szőke	n/a	–	–	–	Budapest
2003	Mensur Suljović	n/a	beat	(Hungary) Attila Boszok	n/a	–	–	–	Budapest
2004	(Hungary) Tamás Turi	n/a	beat	(Austria) Dietmar Burger	n/a	–	–	–	Budapest
2005	(Austria) Dietmar Burger	n/a	beat	(Netherlands) Arjan Moen	n/a	–	–	–	Budapest
2006	(Finland) Veijo Viinikka	n/a	beat	(Hungary) Pál Székely	n/a	–	–	–	Budapest
2007	(Netherlands) Remco van Eijden	n/a	beat	(Hungary) Sándor Domonkos	n/a	€2,020	€1,000	€400	Budapest
2008	(Netherlands) Mareno Michels	n/a	6 – 3	(Hungary) Nándor Bezzeg	n/a	€2,640	€1,200	€500	Budapest
2009	(Netherlands) Ad van Haaren	n/a	beat	(Slovakia) Ľuboš Pivarč	n/a	€2,280	€1,000	€500	Budapest
2010	(Netherlands) Willy van de Wiel	n/a	6 – 5	(Netherlands) Joey ten Berge	n/a	€2,280	€1,000	€500	Budapest
2011	(England) Dave Prins	n/a	6 – 4	(Netherlands) Jerry Hendriks	n/a	€3,550	€1,300	€630	Budapest
2012	(England) Dave Prins (2)	n/a	beat	(Serbia) Oliver Ferenc	n/a	€3,550	€1,300	€630	Budapest
2013	(Croatia) Zdravko Antunović	n/a	6 – 4	(Belgium) Geert De Vos	n/a	€1,950	€750	€300	ETO Park, Győr
2014	(Scotland) Paul Coughlin	n/a	beat	(Hungary) János Végső	n/a	€1,950	€750	€300	ETO Park, Győr
2015	(Austria) Aaron Hardy	n/a	beat	(Greece) Kostas Pantelidis	n/a	€1,950	€750	€300	ETO Park, Győr
2016	Krzysztof Ratajski	n/a	6 – 2	Zoran Lerchbacher	n/a	€1,640	€700	€300	Danubius Hungaria City Center, Budapest
2017	(Netherlands) Jeffrey Sparidaans	n/a	6 – 3	Patrik Kovács	n/a	€1,640	€700	€300	Danubius Hungaria City Center, Budapest
2018	Benjamin Pratnemer	n/a	6 – 5	(Hungary) János Végső	n/a	€3,560	€1,000	€600	Danubius Hungaria City Center, Budapest
2019	(Hungary) János Végső	n/a	beat	(Cyprus) Wayne Halliwell	n/a	HUF 1,000,000	HUF 420,000	HUF 180,000	Danubius Hungaria City Center, Budapest
2020	(Hungary) Rajmund Papp	n/a	7 – 4	(Hungary) Csaba Helfrich	n/a	HUF 1,000,000	HUF 420,000	HUF 180,000	Danubius Hungaria City Center, Budapest
2021	Mark Barilli	n/a	6 – 3	Nick Fullwell	n/a	HUF 1,000,000	HUF 420,000	HUF 180,000	Honved Sportcenter, Budapest
2022	Moreno Blom	n/a	5 – 3	Benjamin Pratnemer	n/a	HUF 708,500	HUF 235,000	HUF 117,500	Honved Sportcenter, Budapest
2023	Jitse Van der Wal	n/a	5 – 2	László Kádár	n/a	HUF 708,500	HUF 235,000	HUF 117,500	Honved Sportcenter, Budapest
2024	Jimmy van Schie	n/a	4 – 1	Benjamin Pratnemer	n/a	HUF 576,000	HUF 192,000	HUF 96,000	Honved Sportcenter, Budapest

=== Women's ===
Year	Champion	Av.	Score	Runner-Up	Av.	Prize Money			Venue
Year	Champion	Av.	Score	Runner-Up	Av.	Total	Ch.	R.-Up	Venue
1999	(Sweden) Kristina Pruim	n/a	beat	(Belgium) Sandra Pollet	n/a	–	–	–	Budapest
2000	Vicky Pruim	n/a	beat	(Hungary) Marene Rácz	n/a	–	–	–	Budapest
2001	(Netherlands) Karin Krappen	n/a	beat	(Hungary) Marene Rácz	n/a	–	–	–	Budapest
2002	(Hungary) Nóra Fekete	n/a	beat	(Hungary) Györgyi Kósa	n/a	–	–	–	Budapest
2003	(Switzerland) Lisa Huber	n/a	beat	(Switzerland) Sabine Beutler	n/a	–	–	–	Budapest
2004	(Hungary) Nóra Kautzky	n/a	beat	(Hungary) Orsolya Bódi	n/a	–	–	–	Budapest
2005	(Hungary) Nóra Fekete (2)	n/a	beat	(Norway) Inita Bite	n/a	–	–	–	Budapest
2006	(Norway) Rachna David	n/a	beat	(Hungary) Nóra Fekete	n/a	–	–	–	Budapest
2007	(Norway) Rachna David (2)	n/a	beat	(Hungary) Zsófia Lázár	n/a	–	–	–	Budapest
2008	(Czech Republic) Marketa Abadzievova	n/a	beat	(Hungary) Rita Mayerné	n/a	–	–	–	Budapest
2009	Veronika Ihász	n/a	beat	(Hungary) Viktória Kiss	n/a	–	–	–	Budapest
2010	Stefanie Lück	n/a	beat	(Hungary) Viktória Kiss	n/a	–	–	–	Budapest
2011	Irina Armstrong	n/a	5 – 2	Veronika Ihász	n/a	–	–	–	Budapest
2012	Anca Zijlstra	n/a	beat	Veronika Ihász	n/a	–	–	–	Budapest
2013	Veronika Ihász (2)	n/a	5 – 2	Stefanie Lück	n/a	–	–	–	ETO Park, Győr
2014	Veronika Ihász (3)	n/a	beat	(Netherlands) Danielle Ijpelaar	n/a	–	–	–	ETO Park, Győr
2015	Veronika Ihász (4)	n/a	beat	Deta Hedman	n/a	–	–	–	ETO Park, Győr
2016	Deta Hedman	n/a	5 – 1	Jitka Císařová	n/a	–	–	–	Danubius Hungaria City Center, Budapest
2017	Deta Hedman (2)	n/a	5 – 0	Jitka Císařová	n/a	–	–	–	Danubius Hungaria City Center, Budapest
2018	Aileen de Graaf	n/a	5 – 2	(Hungary) Vivien Czipó	n/a	€1,200	€500	€250	Danubius Hungaria City Center, Budapest
2019	Deta Hedman (3)	n/a	beat	Aileen de Graaf	n/a	HUF 334,000	HUF 140,000	HUF 60,000	Danubius Hungaria City Center, Budapest
2020	Veronika Ihász (5)	n/a	6 – 1	(Hungary) Eva Nemeth	n/a	HUF 334,000	HUF 140,000	HUF 60,000	Danubius Hungaria City Center, Budapest
2021	Deta Hedman (4)	n/a	5 – 0	Adrienne Vegso	n/a	HUF 334,000	HUF 140,000	HUF 60,000	Honved Sportcenter, Budapest
2022	Veronika Ihász (6)	n/a	5 – 0	Jitka Císařová	n/a	HUF 295,500	HUF 117,500	HUF 59,000	Honved Sportcenter, Budapest
2023	Anna Votavová	n/a	4 – 2	Jitka Císařová	n/a	HUF 295,500	HUF 117,500	HUF 59,000	Honved Sportcenter, Budapest
2024	Jitka Císařová	n/a	4 – 1	Gréta Tekauer	n/a	HUF 240,000	HUF 96,000	HUF 48,000	Honved Sportcenter, Budapest
2025	Rhian O'Sullivan	72.95	5 – 3	Deta Hedman	75.57	€2,400	€800	€400	

=== Boys ===
Year	Champion	Av.	Score	Runner-up	Av.	Venue
2008	(Hungary) Tibor Tax	n/a	beat	(Hungary) Zoltán Darányi	n/a	Budapest
2009	(Hungary) Tamás Darányi	n/a	beat	(Hungary) Tibor Tax	n/a	Budapest
2010	(Hungary) Zoltán Darányi	n/a	beat	Rowby-John Rodriguez	n/a	Budapest
2011	Patrik Kovács	n/a	4 – 3	Rowby-John Rodriguez	n/a	Budapest
2012	Patrik Kovács (2)	n/a	beat	(Austria) Manuel Rechberger	n/a	Budapest
2013	Patrik Kovács (3)	n/a	beat	(Austria) Fredi Gsellmann	n/a	ETO Park, Győr
2014	(Italy) Franco Giuliani	n/a	beat	(Austria) Nico Mandl	n/a	ETO Park, Győr
2015	(Hungary) György Vörösházi	n/a	4 – 0	(Hungary) Dániel Takács	n/a	ETO Park, Győr
2016	Rusty-Jake Rodriguez	n/a	4 – 0	(Austria) Tobias Fischer	n/a	Danubius Hungaria City Center, Budapest
2017	(Austria) Julian Peuler	n/a	4 – 0	(Austria) Marco Jungwirth	n/a	Danubius Hungaria City Center, Budapest
2018	Daan Bastiaansen	n/a	4 – 2	(Czech Republic) Vilém Sedivy	n/a	Danubius Hungaria City Center, Budapest
2019	(Hungary) Zsombor Budavári	n/a	beat	(Hungary) Rajmund Papp	n/a	Danubius Hungaria City Center, Budapest
2020	(Hungary) Botond Kotlar	n/a	5 – 1	(Hungary) Almos Kovács	n/a	Danubius Hungaria City Center, Budapest
2021	Adam Sepsi	n/a	5 – 1	(Hungary) Balazs Pazonyi	n/a	Honved Sportcenter, Budapest
2022	András Borbély	n/a	4 – 2	Balázs Szoták	n/a	Honved Sportcenter, Budapest
2023	Adam Sepsi (2)	n/a	4 – 3	Marcel Schluepfinger	n/a	Honved Sportcenter, Budapest
2024	Kendji Steinbach	n/a	4 – 2	Balázs Szoták	n/a	Honved Sportcenter, Budapest

=== Girls ===
Year	Champion	Av.	Score	Runner-up	Av.	Venue
2012	(Hungary) Ramóna Réti	n/a	beat	(Hungary) Nora Palfi	n/a	Budapest
2013	(Hungary) Vivien Czipó	n/a	beat	(Hungary) Ramóna Réti	n/a	ETO Park, Győr
2014	(Hungary) Vivien Czipó (2)	n/a	beat	(Austria) Samantha Ostry	n/a	ETO Park, Győr
2015	(Hungary) Vivien Czipó (3)	n/a	beat	(Hungary) Boglárka Bokor	n/a	ETO Park, Győr
2016	(Hungary) Vivien Czipó (4)	n/a	beat	(Czech Republic) Barbora Hospodářská	n/a	Danubius Hungaria City Center, Budapest
2017	Anna Votavová	n/a	4 – 3	(Hungary) Vivien Czipó	n/a	Danubius Hungaria City Center, Budapest
2018	(Hungary) Tamara Kovács	n/a	4 – 3	(Hungary) Vivien Czipó	n/a	Danubius Hungaria City Center, Budapest
2019	(Hungary) Tamara Kovács (2)	n/a	beat	(Hungary) Viktória Laczi	n/a	Danubius Hungaria City Center, Budapest
2021	(Russia) Aleksandra Zemtsova	n/a	5 – 3	Ksenia Klochek	n/a	Honved Sportcenter, Budapest
2022	Krisztina Turai	n/a	4 – 2	Tamara Kovács	n/a	Honved Sportcenter, Budapest
2023	Hanna Rábaközi	n/a	4 – 2	Jessica Wendl	n/a	Honved Sportcenter, Budapest
2024	Sophie McKinlay	n/a	3 – 2	Krisztina Turai	n/a	Honved Sportcenter, Budapest

== Tournament records ==
- Most wins 2: (England) Dave Prins.
- Most Finals 3: (Hungary) János Végső, (Slovenia) Benjamin Pratnemer.
- Most Semi Finals 4: (Hungary) Nándor Bezzeg.
- Most Quarter Finals 7: (Hungary) Nándor Bezzeg.
- Most Appearances 9: (Hungary) Nándor Bezzeg, (Hungary) Pal Szekely.
- Most Prize Money won €1387: (Netherlands) Ad van Haaren.
- Youngest Winner age 23: (Netherlands) Mareno Michels.
- Oldest Winner age 43: (England) Dave Prins.
