= John Desreumaux =

Belgian darts player

Personal information
- Nickname: "Killer Bee"
- Born: 24 October 1974 (age 51) Belgium

Sport
- Sport: Darts
- Playing since: 2010
- Darts: 22g DiD
- Laterality: Right-handed
- Walk-on music: "Killer Bee" by Anouk

Organisation (see split in darts)
- BDO: 2012–2020
- WDF: 2012–

WDF major events – best performances
- World Championship: Last 32: 2022
- Dutch Open: Quarter Final: 2020

Other tournament wins
- Years
Malta Open	2021

John Desreumaux (born 24 October 1974) is a Belgian professional darts player who plays in World Darts Federation (WDF) events. He is a Malta Open champion. He has represented Belgium during the WDF Europe Cup tournaments.

== Career ==
For a long time, Desreumaux could not play in the limelight, although he has tried his hand at larger tournaments since 2012, it has rarely resulted in anything countable. Until 2018 he reached a maximum of the last 32 phase at various international events. Good performances in the domestic yard ensured him a start in the 2014 WDF Europe Cup. In singles competition he lost in first round to Daniel Zygla by 3–4 in legs. In pairs competition he played with Jeffrey Van Egdom and advanced to third round where he lost to James Wilson and Glen Durrant. In team competition Belgians lost in second round to Scotland by 5–9 in points.

Four years later, he was again invited by the national federation to participate in the 2018 WDF Europe Cup. For second time he lost in first round, this time he was defeated by Arwyn Morris 2–4 in legs. He achieved a very good result together with Jeffrey Van Egdom in the pairs competition, where they lost in quarter-finals to eventual silver medalists Pavel Jirkal and Michal Ondo. In team competition Belgians lost again in second round, but this time to England by 4–9 in points.

In 2019, Desreumaux reached the semi-finals of the debut edition of the French Classic in 2019, where he was defeated by the eventual winner Adam Smith-Neale. At the 2020 Dutch Open he beat Martijn Kleermaker and Richard Veenstra on his way to the quarter-finals before losing 3–5 in legs to Ross Montgomery. Desreumaux worked his way up the world rankings in 2021 by winning the Malta Open title with a 3–5 in legs win over John Scott in the final and collecting enough ranking points with a quarter-final at the Italian Grand Masters to qualify for the 2022 WDF World Darts Championship.

At the World Championship, he beat Donovan Lottering in first round by 2–0 in sets. In the post-match interview, Desreumaux spoke very bluntly about the stress he experienced during his stage performance, which resulted in very low averages. In the second round, he was very close to advance to the next phase of tournament, but lost in the last set to James Hurrell by 2–3 in sets.

== World Championship results ==
=== WDF ===
- 2022: Second round (lost to James Hurrell 2–3) (sets)

== Performance timeline ==
Tournament	2020	2021	2022	2023
WDF Ranked televised events
World Championship	DNQ	NH	2R	
Dutch Open	QF	NH	8R	
