= 2022 Dutch Open (darts) =

Dutch Open

Tournament information
- Dates: 10–12 June 2022
- Venue: De Bonte Wever
- Location: Assen
- Country: Netherlands
- Organisation(s): WDF
- Format: Legs; Sets (only in men's semi-finals and final)
- Prize fund: €26,980 (total)
- Winner's share: €5,000 (men's) €2,500 (women's)

Champion(s)
- Jelle Klaasen (men's); Beau Greaves (women's); Dylan van Lierop (U18 boys); Dominik Kočik (U14 boys); Roos van der Velde (girls)

The 2022 Dutch Open (officially referred to as the 2022 TOTO Dutch Open Darts) was the 49th edition of the Dutch Open organised by the World Darts Federation. The tournament was held at the De Bonte Wever in Assen, Netherlands. Tournament has been awarded Platinum ranking status, with a total prize fund €27,650.

Ross Montgomery who won the previous men's tournament was absent from the event, having switched to the Professional Darts Corporation in January 2022. Aileen de Graaf as three-time champion was defending women's title, but she lost in quarter-finals to later finalist Rhian O'Sullivan.

Jelle Klaasen became the new champion. This is his first victory in the World Darts Federation tournament since the victory at 2006 BDO World Darts Championship. Beau Greaves won the women's tournament. The remaining youth's trophies going to Dylan van Lierop, Roos van der Velde and Dominik Kočik.

== Prize money ==
| Stage (num. of players) | | Prize money | | | |
| Stage (num. of players) | | Men | Women | Boys | Girls |
|---|---|---|---|---|---|
| Winner | (1) | €5,000 | €2,500 | €150 | €125 |
| Runner-up | (1) | €2,500 | €1,250 | €100 | €75 |
| Semi-finalists | (2) | €1,250 | €750 | €50 | €40 |
| Quarter-finalists | (4) | €500 | €250 | €25 | — |
| Last 16 | (8) | €200 | €100 | — | — |
| Last 32 | (16) | €100 | €50 | — | — |
| Last 64 | (32) | €50 | — | — | — |
| Last 128 | (64) | €25 | — | — | — |
| Total | | €26,980 | | | |

== Men's ==
=== Seeds ===
Seeding was take place in accordance of the WDF Rankings for 25 May 2022. The players was seeded in accordance with WDF regulations, but not always as the first match in the section. The first byes go to the seeded players, but after that the byes are equally divided across the sheets in a random place on the sheet. Jelle Klaasen was the champion without a seeding position.

1. James Hurrell (Eighth round)
2. Neil Duff (third round)
3. Thibault Tricole (semi-finals)
4. James Richardson (second round)
5. Scott Marsh (second round)
6. Andy Baetens (Seventh round)
7. Richard Veenstra (Seventh round)
8. Mark Barilli (runner-up)
9. Antony Allen (Eighth round)
10. Moreno Blom (fourth round)
11. Barry Copeland (second round)
12. Aaron Turner (Eighth round)
13. Jordan Brooks (Seventh round)
14. John Scott (second round)
15. Mark Graham (fourth round)
16. Lee Shewan (fourth round)

=== Draw (Last 32 onwards) ===
Seventh round (best of 7 legs); 12 June
1 | James Hurrell 92.49 | 4
Tonny Veenhof 75.05 | 0
Gian van Veen | 4
Christian Helmecke | 0
8 | Mark Barilli 85.14 | 4
Willem Mandigers 80.22 | 3
9 | Antony Allen | 4
Alexander Merkx | 2
Ivo Leeksma | 4
Gary Blades | 1
Sjors Kolvers | 0
John Desreumaux | 4
Heine Uuldriks | 2
Bradly Roes | 4
Mark Scholte | 3
Tom van den Hoogen | 4
Danny Holt | 4
Kevin Blomme | 3
Jurjen van der Velde | 4
Jeffrey Sparidaans | 0
7 | Richard Veenstra 86.24 | 0
Jelle Klaasen 92.49 | 4
12 | Aaron Turner | 4
Robbie Knops | 2
3 | Thibault Tricole 90.04 | 4
Jeroen Mioch 88.00 | 1
13 | Jordan Brooks | 0
Arjan Konterman | 4
6 | Andy Baetens 80.17 | 1
Johan van Velzen 87.00 | 4
Michel van der Horst | 2
David Kirwan | 4

Eighth round (best of 7 legs); 12 June
1 | James Hurrell 88.73 | 1
Gian van Veen 89.05 | 4
8 | Mark Barilli 86.21 | 4
9 | Antony Allen 82.04 | 2
Ivo Leeksma | 4
John Desreumaux | 2
Bradly Roes | 4
Tom van den Hoogen | 2
Danny Holt | 1
Jurjen van der Velde | 4
Jelle Klaasen 88.93 | 4
12 | Aaron Turner 85.80 | 1
3 | Thibault Tricole 88.87 | 4
Arjan Konterman 85.03 | 1
Johan van Velzen 81.26 | 4
David Kirwan 69.07 | 1

Quarter-finals (best of 9 legs); 12 June
Gian van Veen 85.20 | 3
8 | Mark Barilli 83.12 | 5
Ivo Leeksma 84.17 | 5
Bradly Roes 75.50 | 3
Jurjen van der Velde 81.05 | 2
Jelle Klaasen 80.81 | 5
3 | Thibault Tricole 88.04 | 5
Johan van Velzen 85.84 | 1

Semi-finals (best of 3 sets); 12 June
8 | Mark Barilli 82.63 | 2
Ivo Leeksma 81.38 | 1
Jelle Klaasen 89.74 | 2
3 | Thibault Tricole 95.19 | 1

Final (best of 5 sets); 12 June
8 | Mark Barilli 74.01 | 0
Jelle Klaasen 83.47 | 3

== Women's ==
=== Seeds ===
Seeding was take place in accordance of the WDF Rankings for 25 May 2022. The players was seeded in accordance with WDF regulations, but not always as the first match in the section. The first byes go to the seeded players, but after that the byes are equally divided across the sheets in a random place on the sheet.

1. Deta Hedman (fourth round)
2. Beau Greaves (champion)
3. Kirsty Hutchinson (semi-finals)
4. Anca Zijlstra (second round)
5. Suzanne Smith (fourth round)
6. Jo Clements (fourth round)
7. Lorraine Hyde (fifth round)
8. Aileen de Graaf (quarter-finals)
9. Laura Turner (fifth round)
10. Lorraine Winstanley (quarter-finals)
11. Paula Jacklin (quarter-finals)
12. Maria O'Brien (fifth round)
13. Natalie Gilbert (fifth round)
14. Priscilla Steenbergen (second round)
15. Margaret Sutton (fifth round)
16. Rhian O'Sullivan (runner-up)

=== Draw (Last 32 onwards) ===
Fourth round (best of 7 legs); 11 June
1 | Deta Hedman 66.69 | 2
Nathalie van Marm 71.26 | 4
16 | Rhian O'Sullivan | 4
Chris Savvery | 1
8 | Aileen de Graaf | 4
Talita Biagetti | 1
9 | Laura Turner | 4
Lisa Ashton | 2
Irina Armstrong | 4
Lena Zollikofer | 0
13 | Natalie Gilbert | 4
Adriana van Wijgerden | 2
5 | Suzanne Smith | 2
Vanessa Zuidema | 4
12 | Maria O'Brien | 4
Monique Leßmeister | 3
2 | Beau Greaves 76.44 | 4
Melissa Landkroon 53.87 | 1
15 | Margaret Sutton | 4
Aurora Fochesato | 0
7 | Lorraine Hyde | 4
Marjolein Noijens | 1
10 | Lorraine Winstanley | 4
Mery Voskamp | 0
3 | Kirsty Hutchinson | 4
Astrid Trouwborst | 0
Lerena Rietbergen | 4
Saskia van Zoeren | 1
6 | Jo Clements | 2
Karin Harmsen | 4
11 | Paula Jacklin | 4
Fabienne Romelingh | 2

Fifth round (best of 7 legs); 11 June
Nathalie van Marm 61.11 | 1
16 | Rhian O'Sullivan 73.09 | 4
8 | Aileen de Graaf 81.79 | 4
9 | Laura Turner 79.96 | 3
Irina Armstrong | 4
13 | Natalie Gilbert | 2
Vanessa Zuidema | 4
12 | Maria O'Brien | 3
2 | Beau Greaves 85.89 | 4
15 | Margaret Sutton 70.48 | 0
7 | Lorraine Hyde | 3
10 | Lorraine Winstanley | 4
3 | Kirsty Hutchinson | 4
Lerena Rietbergen | 0
Karin Harmsen | 0
11 | Paula Jacklin | 4

Quarter-finals (best of 7 legs); 11 June
16 | Rhian O'Sullivan 75.04 | 4
8 | Aileen de Graaf 73.50 | 3
Irina Armstrong 59.32 | 4
Vanessa Zuidema 60.32 | 2
2 | Beau Greaves 78.64 | 4
10 | Lorraine Winstanley 71.52 | 2
3 | Kirsty Hutchinson 70.67 | 4
11 | Paula Jacklin 65.43 | 1

Semi-finals (best of 7 legs); 11 June
16 | Rhian O'Sullivan 74.27 | 4
Irina Armstrong 65.64 | 2
2 | Beau Greaves 82.16 | 4
3 | Kirsty Hutchinson 68.38 | 1

Final (best of 9 legs); 12 June
16 | Rhian O'Sullivan 81.21 | 1
2 | Beau Greaves 85.21 | 5

== Boys (U18) ==
=== Seeds ===
Seeding was take place in accordance of the WDF Rankings for 25 May 2022. The players was seeded in accordance with WDF regulations, but not always as the first match in the section. The first byes go to the seeded players, but after that the byes are equally divided across the sheets in a random place on the sheet. No one from top-ranking players advanced to final stage.

1. Tinus van Tiel (third round)
2. ~~Bradly Roes~~ (withdrew)
3. Ondřej Skalický (second round)
4. Yorik Hofkens (first round)
5. Luis Liptow (second round)
6. Francesco Basili (second round)
7. Mavi Nitsch (first round)
8. Quinten de Rijk (second round)

=== Draw (Last 8 onwards) ===
Quarter-finals (best of 5 legs); 12 June
Liam Maendl-Lawrance | 2
Sydnee de Vries | 3
Mats Theobald | 1
Enrico Frank | 3
Dylan van Lierop | 3
Bram van Dijk | 0
Damon Brouwers | 3
Joshua Adriaanse | 0

Semi-finals (best of 5 legs); 12 June
Sydnee de Vries | 3
Enrico Frank | 2
Dylan van Lierop | 3
Damon Brouwers | 2

Final (best of 7 legs); 12 June
Sydnee de Vries 57.15 | 0
Dylan van Lierop 75.15 | 4

== Girls ==
=== Seeds ===
Seeding was take place in accordance of the WDF Rankings for 25 May 2022. The players was seeded in accordance with WDF regulations, but not always as the first match in the section. The first byes go to the seeded players, but after that the byes are equally divided across the sheets in a random place on the sheet.

1. Wibke Riemann (semi-finals)
2. Marlene Klupsch (runner-up)

=== Draw (Last 8 onwards) ===
Quarter-finals (best of 5 legs); 12 June
1 | Wibke Riemann | 3
Aranka van der Waals | 0
Roos van der Velde | 3
Chantal Tessin | 1
2 | Marlene Klupsch | 3
Daphne Camijn | 0
Maja Lewandowska | 0
Kyenta Ysewijn | 3

Semi-finals (best of 5 legs); 12 June
1 | Wibke Riemann | 1
Roos van der Velde | 3
2 | Marlene Klupsch | 3
Kyenta Ysewijn | 1

Final (best of 5 legs); 12 June
Roos van der Velde 51.44 | 3
2 | Marlene Klupsch 50.68 | 2

== Boys (U14) ==
=== Draw (Last 8 onwards) ===
Quarter-finals (best of 5 legs); 12 June
Joeri Schorfhaar | 0
Lukas Arend | 3
Wassim Dghoughi | 1
Koen Schreuders | 3
Ruben Baalmans | 3
Brent Rozema | 0
Dominik Kočik | 3
Tom van Nijnatten | 1

Semi-finals (best of 5 legs); 12 June
Lukas Arend | 2
Koen Schreuders | 3
Ruben Baalmans | 0
Dominik Kočik | 3

Final (best of 7 legs); 12 June
Koen Schreuders 63.82 | 2
Dominik Kočik 69.77 | 3
