= Arjan Konterman =

Dutch darts player

Personal information
- Full name: Arjan Konterman
- Born: 28 July 1990 (age 36) Staphorst, Netherlands
- Home town: Staphorst, Netherlands

Sport
- Sport: Darts
- Darts: 23g Winmau
- Laterality: Right-handed

Organisation (see split in darts)
- PDC: 2016–
- WDF: 2020–

WDF major events – best performances
- World Championship: Last 32: 2023
- World Masters: Last 128: 2022
- Dutch Open: Semi Final: 2023

Arjan Konterman (28 July 1990) is a Dutch professional darts player who currently plays in Professional Darts Corporation (PDC) and World Darts Federation (WDF) events. He qualified for the 2023 WDF World Darts Championship.

== Career ==
Konterman began his career in local tournaments, where he had occasional success. In February 2020, he took part in the 2020 Dutch Open, where he advanced to the ninth round and finally lost to Brian Raman by 1–4 in legs. The coronavirus pandemic caused his career to slow down significantly. During this time, he honed his skills and returned to international competition in 2021. In December 2021, he took part in the qualifiers for the WDF World Darts Championship, but lost in the Last 32 phase to Jeffrey Bekema by 1–4 in legs.

In 2022, he achieved great success by advancing to the 2022 Dutch Darts Championship as a host-nation qualifier. In the first round, he lost to Danny Noppert by 0–6 in legs. Two weeks later, he took part in the 2022 Dutch Open, where he again advanced to the final stage of the tournament. On his way to the eighth round, he defeated Francesco Raschini and Jordan Brooks. He lost to Thibault Tricole by 1–4 in legs. In December, he made his World Masters debut. In the group-stage phase he finished second, which allowed him to advance to the next round, but in the next match he lost to Luke Littler by 0–5 in legs. A day later, he won a qualification for the 2023 WDF World Darts Championship.

In January 2023, he took part in the PDC Q-School qualifying tournament.

== World Championship results ==
=== WDF ===
- 2023: Second round (lost to Alexander Merkx 1–3)

== Performance timeline ==
Tournament	2020	2021	2022	2023
WDF Ranked televised events
World Championship	NH		DNQ	2R
World Masters	NH		2R	
Dutch Open	9R	NH	8R	
Career statistics
Year-end ranking (PDC)	–	–	200	
