= 2022 WDF World Darts Championship =

2022 WDF World Championship

Tournament information
- Dates: 2–10 April 2022
- Venue: Lakeside Country Club
- Location: Frimley Green, Surrey, England
- Organisation(s): World Darts Federation (WDF)
- Format: Sets
- Prize fund: £300,000 (total)
- Winner's share: £50,000 (Men's) £25,000 (Women's) £5,000 (Boys) £2,000 (Girls)
- High checkout: 164; Richard Veenstra; Michael Warburton; Veronika Ihász

Champion(s)
- Neil Duff (NIR) (men); Beau Greaves (ENG) (women); Bradly Roes (NED) (boys); Eleanor Cairns (ENG) (girls)

The 2022 WDF World Championship (known for sponsorship reasons as the 2022 Lakeside WDF World Championship) was the first World Championship organised by the World Darts Federation (WDF). The tournament was held at the Lakeside Country Club in Frimley Green, Surrey, England, which hosted the now-defunct BDO World Darts Championship from 1986 to 2020. The titles were won by Neil Duff in the men's competition, and Beau Greaves in the women's.

The WDF made the decision to postpone the tournament by three months, due to growing concerns and potential government restrictions relating to the COVID-19 pandemic.

Neil Duff and Thibault Tricole became the first players from Northern Ireland and France respectively to reach the final of a World Darts Championship.

In his last 16 victory over Luke Littler, Richard Veenstra recorded the highest three dart average in the venue's history with 104.91.

In her second-round match, Veronika Ihász hit the biggest outshot for a female competitor in world championship history with a 164.

18-year-old Beau Greaves became the youngest ever winner of a senior world championship, defeating Kirsty Hutchinson 4–0 in the final. She also produced a record average of 92.02, which stands as the best in a final of the Women's World Championship, and the third-best in the history of the Women's World Championship.

== Prize money ==
Position	Prize money			
Position	Men	Women	Boys	Girls
Winner	£50,000	£25,000	£5,000	£2,000
Runner-up	£25,000	£12,500	£2,500	£1,000
Semi-finalist	£12,500	£6,500	£1,000	—N/a
Quarter-finalist	£6,500	£3,250	—N/a	—N/a
Last 16	£3,250	£2,000	—N/a	—N/a
Last 24	—N/a	£1,000	—N/a	—N/a
Last 32	£2,000	—N/a	—N/a	—N/a
Last 48	£1,000	—N/a	—N/a	—N/a
Event Totals	£200,000	£87,500	£9,500	£3,000
Overall Total	£300,000			

== Schedule ==
Saturday, 2 April

Game #	Round	Player 1	Score	Player 2	Set 1	Set 2	Set 3
01	1	Martin Adams 81.97	0 – 2	Jarred Cole 92.69	1 – 3	2 – 3	—N/a
02	1	John Scott 75.05	0 – 2	Johnny Haines 89.64	0 – 3	1 – 3	—N/a
03	1	Paula Jacklin 68.66	0 – 2	Rhian O'Sullivan 85.89	0 – 3	0 – 3	—N/a
04	1	Ben Hazel 72.59	2 – 1	Haupai Puha 74.27	3 – 2	1 – 3	3 – 0
05	1	Andreas Harrysson 84.94	1 – 2	László Kádár 82.97	3 – 0	0 – 3	2 – 3
06	1	Amanda Harwood 66.62	1 – 2	Marjolein Noijens 64.96	2 – 3	3 – 1	1 – 3
07	1	Landon Gardiner 79.60	0 – 2	Jim McEwan 101.32	0 – 3	1 – 3	—N/a
08	1	Priscilla Steenbergen 56.77	2 – 1	Darlene Van Sleeuwen 53.05	3 – 2	2 – 3	3 – 0
09	1	Mark Barilli 77.80	0 – 2	Rory Hansen 75.96	1 – 3	2 – 3	—N/a
10	1	Mark Graham 79.66	0 – 2	Dave Prins 89.46	1 – 3	0 – 3	—N/a
11	1	Suzanne Smith 68.36	1 – 2	Jo Clements 66.87	3 – 1	0 – 3	2 – 3
12	1	Paul Hogan 79.00	1 – 2	Justin Thompson 78.32	1 – 3	3 – 2	0 – 3

Sunday, 3 April

Game #	Round	Player 1	Score	Player 2	Set 1	Set 2	Set 3
13	1	Ian Jones 78.00	2 – 1	David Cameron 79.66	3 – 0	0 – 3	3 – 2
14	1	John Desreumaux 72.23	2 – 0	Donovan Lottering 65.29	3 – 1	3 – 0	—N/a
15	1	Lorraine Hyde 66.84	0 – 2	Tori Kewish 68.75	2 – 3	2 – 3	—N/a
16	1	Francesco Raschini 72.62	1 – 2	Ryan de Vreede 77.23	2 – 3	3 – 1	0 – 3
17	1	Lee Shewan 73.34	2 – 1	Jordan Brooks 67.42	3 – 2	0 – 3	3 – 0
18	1	Vicky Pruim 62.00	2 – 0	Desi Mercer 59.14	3 – 2	3 – 2	—N/a
19	1	Dave Parletti 88.59	2 – 1	Shaun McDonald 85.14	0 – 3	3 – 0	3 – 1
20	1	Paula Murphy 53.98	0 – 2	Veronika Ihász 71.57	0 – 3	0 – 3	—N/a
21	1	Connor Scutt 79.41	0 – 2	Shawn Burt 76.92	2 – 3	1 – 3	—N/a
22	1	Steve Hine 83.31	2 – 0	Kevin Luke 79.43	3 – 2	3 – 2	—N/a
23	1	Laura Turner 68.89	0 – 2	Mikuru Suzuki 74.35	0 – 3	2 – 3	—N/a
24	1	James Richardson 81.82	2 – 1	Sebastian Steyer 75.20	3 – 0	2 – 3	3 – 1

Monday, 4 April

Game #	Round	Player 1	Score	Player 2	Set 1	Set 2	Set 3	Set 4	Set 5
25	2	Michael Warburton 85.73	3 – 2	Dave Prins 88.70	3 – 2	2 – 3	3 – 0	2 – 3	3 – 2
26	2	Maria O'Brien 70.98	2 – 1	Marjolein Noijens 61.51	1 – 3	3 – 1	3 – 1	—N/a	—N/a
27	2	Aaron Turner 81.17	1 – 3	Jim McEwan 92.48	0 – 3	3 – 2	2 – 3	1 – 3	—N/a
28	2	Luke Littler 91.25	3 – 2	Ben Hazel 83.20	1 – 3	3 – 1	3 – 0	1 – 3	3 – 1
29	2	Antony Allen 76.10	0 – 3	Jarred Cole 84.16	1 – 3	0 – 3	1 – 3	—N/a	—N/a
30	2	Corrine Hammond 74.40	1 – 2	Rhian O'Sullivan 75.30	1 – 3	3 – 0	0 – 3	—N/a	—N/a
31	2	Richard Veenstra 81.45	3 – 0	László Kádár 76.90	3 – 1	3 – 0	3 – 1	—N/a	—N/a
32	2	Brian Raman 92.61	3 – 2	Johnny Haines 87.43	3 – 2	3 – 0	2 – 3	2 – 3	3 – 2

Tuesday, 5 April

Game #	Round	Player 1	Score	Player 2	Set 1	Set 2	Set 3	Set 4	Set 5
33	2	Nick Fullwell 75.16	3 – 0	Rory Hansen 67.06	3 – 0	3 – 1	3 – 1	—N/a	—N/a
34	2	Anca Zijlstra 64.04	0 – 2	Priscilla Steenbergen 70.57	1 – 3	2 – 3	—N/a	—N/a	—N/a
35	2	Neil Duff 88.77	3 – 0	Justin Thompson 81.74	3 – 2	3 – 0	3 – 2	—N/a	—N/a
36	2	Cameron Menzies 89.21	3 – 1	Ian Jones 80.54	3 – 0	2 – 3	3 – 0	3 – 2	—N/a
37	2	James Hurrell 75.22	3 – 2	John Desreumaux 73.83	1 – 3	3 – 2	3 – 0	0 – 3	3 – 0
38	2	Kirsty Hutchinson 68.83	2 – 0	Jo Clements 67.91	3 – 1	3 – 2	—N/a	—N/a	—N/a
39	2	Jules van Dongen 85.26	1 – 3	Ryan de Vreede 84.54	2 – 3	2 – 3	3 – 1	1 – 3	—N/a

Wednesday, 6 April

Game #	Round	Player 1	Score	Player 2	Set 1	Set 2	Set 3	Set 4	Set 5
40	2	Thibault Tricole 86.48	3 – 2	Shawn Burt 82.59	3 – 2	2 – 3	0 – 3	3 – 0	3 – 2
41	2	Deta Hedman 65.42	0 – 2	Tori Kewish 76.42	0 – 3	0 – 3	—N/a	—N/a	—N/a
42	2	Leonard Gates 87.07	0 – 3	Steve Hine 86.41	1 – 3	2 – 3	2 – 3	—N/a	—N/a
43	2	Andy Baetens 92.35	3 – 1	Dave Parletti 76.89	3 – 0	3 – 0	1 – 3	3 – 1	—N/a
44	2	Scott Marsh 89.77	3 – 2	James Richardson 86.64	2 – 3	3 – 2	3 – 0	1 – 3	3 – 1
45	3	Luke Littler 92.76	0 – 3	Richard Veenstra 104.91	1 – 3	0 – 3	0 – 3	—N/a	—N/a
46	2	Lorraine Winstanley 76.23	2 – 0	Vicky Pruim 68.11	3 – 2	3 – 1	—N/a	—N/a	—N/a
47	3	Brian Raman 97.47	3 – 0	Jarred Cole 90.82	3 – 0	3 – 1	3 – 1	—N/a	—N/a
48	2	Wayne Warren 94.77	3 – 2	Lee Shewan 86.79	1 – 3	2 – 3	3 – 1	3 – 1	3 – 0

Thursday, 7 April

Game #	Round	Player 1	Score	Player 2	Set 1	Set 2	Set 3	Set 4	Set 5
49	3	Neil Duff 88.06	3 – 1	Nick Fullwell 85.67	3 – 1	3 – 1	1 – 3	3 – 1	—N/a
50	2	Beau Greaves 78.01	2 – 1	Veronika Ihász 73.90	3 – 2	2 – 3	3 – 1	—N/a	—N/a
51	3	Jim McEwan 84.01	3 – 2	Michael Warburton 84.71	3 – 1	0 – 3	0 – 3	3 – 1	3 – 1
52	3	James Hurrell 89.87	3 – 0	Ryan de Vreede 85.98	3 – 1	3 – 2	3 – 1	—N/a	—N/a
53	3	Wayne Warren 86.32	0 – 3	Cameron Menzies 87.35	1 – 3	1 – 3	2 – 3	—N/a	—N/a
54	2	Aileen de Graaf 76.48	2 – 1	Mikuru Suzuki 69.90	1 – 3	3 – 0	3 – 0	—N/a	—N/a
55	3	Thibault Tricole 90.36	3 – 1	Steve Hine 88.35	2 – 3	3 – 0	3 – 1	3 – 2	—N/a
56	3	Andy Baetens 102.79	3 – 0	Scott Marsh 96.20	3 – 1	3 – 2	3 – 0	—N/a	—N/a

Friday, 8 April

Game #	Round	Player 1	Score	Player 2	Set 1	Set 2	Set 3	Set 4	Set 5	Set 6	Set 7
57	QF	Priscilla Steenbergen 63.10	1 – 2	Kirsty Hutchinson 70.67	3 – 2	1 – 3	1 – 3	—N/a	—N/a	—N/a	—N/a
58	QF	Jim McEwan 89.09	3 – 4	Neil Duff 94.28	3 – 2	3 – 2	3 – 1	2 – 3	0 – 3	2 – 3	1 – 3
59	QF	Rhian O'Sullivan 89.21	2 – 0	Maria O'Brien 75.14	3 – 2	3 – 1	—N/a	—N/a	—N/a	—N/a	—N/a
60	QF	Thibault Tricole 89.33	4 – 3	Andy Baetens 92.97	0 – 3	3 – 2	1 – 3	3 – 2	3 – 2	1 – 3	3 – 2
61	QF	Tori Kewish 62.80	1 – 2	Lorraine Winstanley 64.95	2 – 3	3 – 1	0 – 3	—N/a	—N/a	—N/a	—N/a
62	QF	Brian Raman 89.10	2 – 4	Richard Veenstra 94.83	2 – 3	1 – 3	3 – 1	3 – 2	2 – 3	2 – 3	—N/a
63	QF	Aileen de Graaf 76.38	0 – 2	Beau Greaves 85.84	1 – 3	0 – 3	—N/a	—N/a	—N/a	—N/a	—N/a
64	QF	Cameron Menzies 93.57	4 – 0	James Hurrell 88.77	3 – 2	3 – 0	3 – 0	3 – 2	—N/a	—N/a	—N/a

Saturday, 9 April

Game #	Round	Player 1	Score	Player 2	Set 1	Set 2	Set 3	Set 4	Set 5	Set 6	Set 7	Set 8	Set 9
65	SF	Leighton Bennett 77.26	1 – 2	Charlie Large 75.22	2 – 3	3 – 0	2 – 3	—N/a	—N/a	—N/a	—N/a	—N/a	—N/a
66	SF	Luis Liptow 63.52	0 – 2	Bradly Roes 67.88	1 – 3	1 – 3	—N/a	—N/a	—N/a	—N/a	—N/a	—N/a	—N/a
67	SF	Rhian O'Sullivan 76.32	2 – 3	Kirsty Hutchinson 76.13	2 – 3	2 – 3	3 – 1	3 – 1	2 – 3	—N/a	—N/a	—N/a	—N/a
68	SF	Richard Veenstra 89.30	2 – 5	Neil Duff 93.75	1 – 3	3 – 0	1 – 3	3 – 2	0 – 3	2 – 3	0 – 3	—N/a	—N/a
69	SF	Lorraine Winstanley 72.44	0 – 3	Beau Greaves 84.06	0 – 3	0 – 3	2 – 3	—N/a	—N/a	—N/a	—N/a	—N/a	—N/a
70	SF	Thibault Tricole 87.26	5 – 4	Cameron Menzies 87.39	3 – 2	3 – 2	2 – 3	1 – 3	3 – 1	3 – 2	1 – 3	2 – 3	3 – 1

Sunday, 10 April

Game #	Round	Player 1	Score	Player 2	Set 1	Set 2	Set 3	Set 4	Set 5	Set 6	Set 7	Set 8	Set 9	Set 10	Set 11
71	F	Eleanor Cairns 52.45	2 – 0	Wibke Riemann 52.22	3 – 1	3 – 2	—N/a	—N/a	—N/a	—N/a	—N/a	—N/a	—N/a	—N/a	—N/a
72	F	Charlie Large 71.56	1 – 3	Bradly Roes 71.34	1 – 3	0 – 3	3 – 0	0 – 3	—N/a	—N/a	—N/a	—N/a	—N/a	—N/a	—N/a
73	F	Beau Greaves 92.05	4 – 0	Kirsty Hutchinson 72.52	3 – 0	3 – 1	3 – 0	3 – 0	—N/a	—N/a	—N/a	—N/a	—N/a	—N/a	—N/a
74	F	Neil Duff 87.73	6 – 5	Thibault Tricole 86.95	0 – 3	0 – 3	3 – 1	0 – 3	3 – 1	3 – 2	3 – 2	2 – 3	3 – 2	0 – 3	3 – 0

== Men's ==
=== Format and qualifiers ===
Qualifying criteria are as follows (cut-off date 4 December 2021):

1. Top 16 players in WDF World Rankings (seeded)
2. Latest winners of the eleven Platinum/Gold ranked tournaments (World Championship, World Masters (later cancelled), Dutch Open, Scottish Open, England Open, Denmark Open, British Open, Welsh Open, Seacoast Open, Irish Open, World Open (later cancelled))
3. First and second ranked players from each of eight regional tables (Australia, Canada, East Europe, New Zealand, North Europe, UK/Ireland, USA, West Europe)
4. Next highest ranked players in the WDF World Rankings to bring the total entry list to 44
5. Two qualifiers from the final qualification tournament in Assen, Netherlands on 5 December 2021
6. Two qualifiers from the final qualification tournament in Frimley Green, England on 5 December 2021

Seeded players begin the competition in the second round. The remaining 32 qualifiers will start in the first round.

The top 16 men in the world rankings that accept their invitations will be seeded into the second round. The provisional list of seeds and invited players is as follows:

1–16 in WDF Rankings
Seeded in second round (Note: Jim Williams (WDF ranked 2, UK/Ireland ranked 2) and Chris Landman (WDF ranked 16) withdrew to play in the 2022 PDC World Darts Championship. Aleksei Kadochnikov (WDF ranked 17) and Antony Allen (WDF ranked 18) replaced them as seeds, while their places in the tournament were filled by the next highest ranked unqualified players from the WDF rankings, Ian Jones and Jim McEwan)

1. Brian Raman
2. Thibault Tricole
3. Wayne Warren
4. ~~Ross Montgomery~~ (Note: Ross Montgomery (#4 seed) and Mario Vandenbogaerde (Assen qualifier) withdrew after winning PDC tour cards in January 2022. They were replaced by Roman Obukhov and Donovan Lottering who had previously turned down their invitations. Aaron Turner (WDF ranked 19) replaced Montgomery as a second round entrant, but was not seeded.)
5. Neil Duff (Champion)
6. James Hurrell
7. Andy Baetens
8. Luke Littler
9. Richard Veenstra
10. Scott Marsh
11. Jules van Dongen
12. Nick Fullwell
13. Michael Warburton
14. Cameron Menzies
15. Leonard Gates (Note: Following the 2022 Russian invasion of Ukraine, the WDF excluded the Russian players Aleksei Kadochnikov and Roman Obukhov. They were replaced by John Scott (next highest in WDF rankings) and Landon Gardiner (previously withdrawn) respectively. Leonard Gates (WDF ranked 20) took Kadochnikov's seeding.)
16. Antony Allen

Platinum/Gold title winners

Pre-qualified
- Wayne Warren – 2020 World Championship
- Brian Raman – 2021 England Open
- Thibault Tricole – 2021 Denmark Open
- Scott Marsh – 2021 British Open
- Cameron Menzies – 2021 Welsh Open
- Jules van Dongen – 2021 Seacoast Open
- Luke Littler – 2021 Irish Open

Regional Table Qualifiers
First round

- Donovan Lottering (Note: Australia region No.1 ranked Raymond Smith withdrew to play in 2022 PDC World Darts Championship. His place was offered to number 3 ranked Donovan Lottering, who also declined his invite, thus he was replaced by 4th ranked Justin Thompson) – Australia
- Justin Thompson – Australia
- David Cameron – Canada
- Shawn Burt (Note: Shawn Burt, Rory Hansen and Matt Campbell finished joint second in the Canada regional table. The WDF decided to invite all three players to the championships, a total of four from the table. Campbell later withdrew to play in the 2022 PDC World Darts Championship. As players ranked below 4 in the regional tables could not be invited, he was replaced by the next highest ranked unqualified player from the WDF rankings, Dave Prins) – Canada
- Rory Hansen – Canada
- László Kádár – East Europe
- Sebastian Steyer – East Europe
- Haupai Puha (Note: New Zealand region number 1 ranked Ben Robb withdrew to play in the 2022 PDC World Darts Championship. Second ranked player Warren Parry also declined his invitation. They were replaced by Haupai Puha and Landon Gardiner, ranked 3 and 4 in the New Zealand table respectively) – New Zealand
- Landon Gardiner (Note: Having initially accepted invitations to compete, North Europe number 1 Roman Obukhov, Australia number 2 Jeremy Fagg and New Zealand number 4 Landon Gardiner withdrew. They were replaced by alternates based on the WDF world rankings: WDF number 38 Kevin Luke, number 40 Jordan Brooks and number 41 Shaun McDonald. 37th ranked Ben Robb and number 39 Raymond Smith had already rejected their invitations) – New Zealand
- Andreas Harrysson – North Europe
- John Desreumaux – West Europe
Pre-qualified
- Neil Duff – UK/Ireland
- Jules van Dongen – USA
- Leonard Gates – USA
- Richard Veenstra – West Europe

WDF Rankings to 44 players
First or second round

- Aaron Turner
- James Richardson
- Dave Parletti
- Connor Scutt
- Mark Barilli
- Mark Graham
- Ben Hazel
- Francesco Raschini
- Martin Adams
- Paul Hogan
- Lee Shewan
- Steve Hine
- Ian Jones
- Jim McEwan
- Dave Prins

Assen Qualifier
First round

- Ryan de Vreede

Lakeside Qualifiers
First round

- Jarred Cole
- Johnny Haines

Alternates
First round

- Kevin Luke
- Jordan Brooks
- Shaun McDonald
- John Scott

=== Draw ===
==== Finals ====
Quarter-finals (best of 7 sets); 8 April
1	Brian Raman 89.10	2
9	Richard Veenstra 94.83	4
Jim McEwan 89.09	3
5	Neil Duff 94.28	4
2	Thibault Tricole 89.33	4
7	Andy Baetens 92.97	3
14	Cameron Menzies 93.57	4
6	James Hurrell 88.77	0

Semi-finals (best of 9 sets); 9 April
9	Richard Veenstra 89.30	2
5	Neil Duff 93.75	5
2	Thibault Tricole 87.26	5
14	Cameron Menzies 87.39	4

Final (best of 11 sets); 10 April
5	Neil Duff 87.73	6
2	Thibault Tricole 86.95	5

==== Rounds 1-4 ====
First round (best of 3 sets); 2–3 April
Alt	John Scott 76.43	0
Q	Johnny Haines 79.64	2
Martin Adams 68.55	0
Q	Jarred Cole 86.19	2
Ben Hazel 72.59	2
Q	Haupai Puha 74.27	1
Q	Andreas Harrysson 84.94	1
Q	László Kádár 82.97	2
Q	Landon Gardiner 79.60	0
Jim McEwan 101.32	2
Mark Graham 79.66	0
Dave Prins 89.46	2
Paul Hogan 79.00	1
Q	Justin Thompson 78.32	2
Mark Barilli 77.80	0
Q	Rory Hansen 75.96	2
Connor Scutt 79.41	0
Q	Shawn Burt 76.92	2
Steve Hine 83.31	2
Alt	Kevin Luke 79.43	0
Dave Parletti 88.59	2
Alt	Shaun McDonald 85.14	1
James Richardson 81.81	2
Q	Sebastian Steyer 75.20	1
Lee Shewan 73.34	2
Alt	Jordan Brooks 67.42	1
Ian Jones 78.00	2
Q	David Cameron 79.66	1
Q	John Desreumaux 72.23	2
Q	Donovan Lottering 65.29	0
Francesco Raschini 72.62	1
Q	Ryan de Vreede 77.23	2

Second round (best of 5 sets); 4–6 April
1	Brian Raman 92.61	3
Q	Johnny Haines 87.43	2
16	Antony Allen 76.10	0
Q	Jarred Cole 84.16	3
8	Luke Littler 91.25	3
Ben Hazel 83.20	2
9	Richard Veenstra 81.45	3
Q	László Kádár 76.90	0
Aaron Turner 81.17	1
Jim McEwan 92.48	3
13	Michael Warburton 85.73	3
Dave Prins 88.70	2
5	Neil Duff 88.77	3
Q	Justin Thompson 81.74	0
12	Nick Fullwell 75.16	3
Q	Rory Hansen 67.06	0
2	Thibault Tricole 86.48	3
Q	Shawn Burt 82.59	2
15	Leonard Gates 87.07	0
Steve Hine 86.41	3
7	Andy Baetens 92.35	3
Dave Parletti 76.89	1
10	Scott Marsh 89.77	3
James Richardson 86.64	2
3	Wayne Warren 94.77	3
Lee Shewan 86.79	2
14	Cameron Menzies 89.21	3
Ian Jones 80.54	1
6	James Hurrell 75.22	3
Q	John Desreumaux 73.83	2
11	Jules van Dongen 85.26	1
Q	Ryan de Vreede 84.54	3

Third round (best of 5 sets); 6–7 April
1	Brian Raman 97.47	3
Q	Jarred Cole 90.82	0
8	Luke Littler 92.76	0
9	Richard Veenstra 104.91	3
Jim McEwan 84.01	3
13	Michael Warburton 84.71	2
5	Neil Duff 88.06	3
12	Nick Fullwell 85.67	1
2	Thibault Tricole 90.36	3
Steve Hine 88.35	1
7	Andy Baetens 102.79	3
10	Scott Marsh 96.20	0
3	Wayne Warren 86.32	0
14	Cameron Menzies 87.35	3
6	James Hurrell 89.87	3
Q	Ryan de Vreede 85.98	0

Quarter-finals (best of 7 sets); 8 April
1	Brian Raman 89.10	2
9	Richard Veenstra 94.83	4
Jim McEwan 89.09	3
5	Neil Duff 94.28	4
2	Thibault Tricole 89.33	4
7	Andy Baetens 92.97	3
14	Cameron Menzies 93.57	4
6	James Hurrell 88.77	0

== Women's ==
=== Format and qualifiers ===
Qualifying criteria are as follows (cut-off date 4 December 2021):

1. Top 8 players in WDF World Rankings (seeded)
2. Latest winners of the eleven Platinum/Gold ranked tournaments (World Championship, World Masters (later cancelled), Dutch Open, Scottish Open, England Open, Denmark Open, British Open, Welsh Open, Seacoast Open, Irish Open, World Open (later cancelled))
3. Top ranked players from each of eight regional tables (Australia, Canada, East Europe, New Zealand, North Europe, UK/Ireland, USA, West Europe)
4. Next highest ranked players in the WDF World Rankings to bring the total entry list to 22
5. One qualifier from the final qualification tournament in Assen, Netherlands on 5 December 2021
6. One qualifier from the final qualification tournament in Frimley Green, England on 5 December 2021

Seeded players begin the competition in the second round. The remaining 16 qualifiers will start in the first round.

The top eight women in the world rankings that accept their invitations will be seeded into the second round. The provisional list of seeds and invited players is as follows:

1–8 in WDF Rankings
Seeded in Second round

1. Deta Hedman
2. Corrine Hammond (Note: Following the 2022 Russian invasion of Ukraine, the WDF excluded the Russian players Anastasia Dobromyslova and Elena Shulgina. They were replaced by Fallon Sherrock (previously withdrawn) and Jo Clements (next highest in WDF rankings) respectively.) (Note: Fallon Sherrock withdrew from the tournament in March 2022 and was replaced by Priscilla Steenbergen. Sherrock's seeded place was taken by Corrine Hammond (WDF #9))
3. Anca Zijlstra
4. Aileen de Graaf
5. Beau Greaves
6. Kirsty Hutchinson
7. Maria O'Brien
8. Lorraine Winstanley

Platinum/Gold title winners
First round

- Mikuru Suzuki – 2020 World Championship
- Paula Murphy – 2021 Seacoast Open
Pre-qualified
- Aileen de Graaf – 2020 Dutch Open
- Beau Greaves – 2020 Scottish Open
- Deta Hedman – 2021 England Open
- Anca Zijlstra – 2021 Denmark Open
- Kirsty Hutchinson – 2021 Welsh Open

Regional Table Qualifiers
First round

- Veronika Ihász – East Europe
- Tori Kewish – Australia
- Desi Mercer (Note: New Zealand region number 1 ranked Wendy Harper declined her invitation. Her place was taken by second ranked Desi Mercer) – New Zealand
- Darlene Van Sleeuwen – Canada
Pre-qualified
- Aileen de Graaf – West Europe
- Paula Murphy – USA

WDF Rankings to 22 players
First round

- Suzanne Smith
- Lorraine Hyde
- Laura Turner
- Paula Jacklin
- Amanda Harwood
- Vicky Pruim
- Jo Clements
- Priscilla Steenbergen

Assen Qualifier
First round

- Marjolein Noijens

Lakeside Qualifier
First round

- Rhian O'Sullivan

=== Draw ===
First round (best of 3 sets); 2–3 April
Lorraine Hyde 66.84	0
Q	Tori Kewish 68.75	2
Vicky Pruim 62.00	2
Q	Desi Mercer 59.14	0
Laura Turner 68.89	0
Mikuru Suzuki 74.35	2
Paula Murphy 53.98	0
Q	Veronika Ihász 71.57	2
Paula Jacklin 68.66	0
Q	Rhian O'Sullivan 85.89	2
Amanda Harwood 66.62	1
Q	Marjolein Noijens 64.96	2
Priscilla Steenbergen 56.77	2
Q	Darlene Van Sleeuwen 53.05	1
Suzanne Smith 68.36	1
Jo Clements 66.87	2

Second round (best of 3 sets); 4–7 April
1	Deta Hedman 65.42	0
Q	Tori Kewish 76.42	2
8	Lorraine Winstanley 76.23	2
Vicky Pruim 68.11	0
4	Aileen de Graaf 76.48	2
Mikuru Suzuki 69.90	1
5	Beau Greaves 78.01	2
Q	Veronika Ihász 73.90	1
2	Corrine Hammond 74.40	1
Q	Rhian O'Sullivan 75.30	2
7	Maria O'Brien 70.98	2
Q	Marjolein Noijens 61.51	1
3	Anca Zijlstra 64.04	0
Priscilla Steenbergen 70.57	2
6	Kirsty Hutchinson 68.83	2
Jo Clements 67.91	0

Quarter-finals (best of 3 sets); 8 April
Q	Tori Kewish 62.80	1
8	Lorraine Winstanley 64.95	2
4	Aileen de Graaf 76.38	0
5	Beau Greaves 85.84	2
Q	Rhian O'Sullivan 89.21	2
7	Maria O'Brien 75.14	0
Priscilla Steenbergen 63.10	1
6	Kirsty Hutchinson 70.67	2

Semi-finals (best of 5 sets); 9 April
8	Lorraine Winstanley 72.44	0
5	Beau Greaves 84.06	3
Q	Rhian O'Sullivan 76.32	2
6	Kirsty Hutchinson 76.13	3

Final (best of 7 sets); 10 April
5	Beau Greaves 92.05	4
6	Kirsty Hutchinson 72.52	0

== Boys' ==
=== Format and qualifiers ===
All boys that will be under the age of 18 on 9 January 2022 shall be eligible to play in the 2022 Lakeside WDF Boys World Championship tournaments. The semi-finals and final of the tournament shall be played at the Lakeside Country Club, Frimley Green, England as a part of the 2022 WDF World Darts Championships tournament.

Qualifying criteria are as follows (cut-off date 4 December 2021):

1. Two qualifiers from the final qualification tournament in Assen, Netherlands on 5 December 2021
2. Two qualifiers from the final qualification tournament in Frimley Green, England on 5 December 2021

Assen Qualifiers

- Luis Liptow
- Bradly Roes

Lakeside Qualifiers

- Leighton Bennett
- Charlie Large

=== Draw ===
Semi-finals (best of 3 sets); 9 April
Luis Liptow 63.52	0
Bradly Roes 67.88	2
Leighton Bennett 77.26	1
Charlie Large 75.21	2

Final (best of 5 sets); 10 April
Bradly Roes 71.34	3
Charlie Large 71.56	1

== Girls' ==
=== Format and qualifiers ===
All girls that will be under the age of 18 on 9 January 2022 shall be eligible to play in the 2022 Lakeside WDF Girls World Championship tournaments. Final of the tournament shall be played at the Lakeside Country Club, Frimley Green, England as a part of the 2022 WDF World Darts Championships tournament.

Qualifying criteria are as follows (cut-off date 4 December 2021):

1. One qualifier from the final qualification tournament in Assen, Netherlands on 5 December 2021
2. One qualifier from the final qualification tournament in Frimley Green, England on 5 December 2021

Assen Qualifier

- Wibke Riemann

Lakeside Qualifier

- Eleanor Cairns

=== Draw ===
Final (best of 3 sets); 10 April
Eleanor Cairns 52.45	2
Wibke Riemann 52.22	0

== Statistics ==
=== Top averages ===
This table shows the highest averages achieved by players throughout the tournament.

==== Men's ====
#	Player	Round	Average	Result	Score
1	Richard Veenstra	R3	104.91	Won	3–0
2	Andy Baetens	R3	102.79	Won	3–0
3	Jim McEwan	R1	101.32	Won	2–0
4	Brian Raman	R3	97.47	Won	3–0
5	Scott Marsh	R3	96.20	Lost	0–3
6	Richard Veenstra (2)	QF	94.83	Won	4–2
7	Wayne Warren	R2	94.77	Won	3–2
8	Neil Duff	QF	94.28	Won	4–3
9	Neil Duff (2)	SF	93.75	Won	5–2
10	Cameron Menzies	QF	93.57	Won	4–0

==== Women's ====
#	Player	Round	Average	Result	Score
1	Beau Greaves	F	92.05	Won	4–0
2	Rhian O'Sullivan	QF	89.21	Won	2–0
3	Rhian O'Sullivan (2)	R1	85.89	Won	2–0
4	Beau Greaves (2)	QF	85.84	Won	2–0
5	Beau Greaves (3)	SF	84.06	Won	3–0

== Representation ==
This table shows the number of players by country in the 2022 WDF World Darts Championship. A total of 18 nationalities were represented.

=== Men's ===
	(France) FRA	(Northern Ireland) NIR	(Scotland) SCO	(Netherlands) NED	(Belgium) BEL	(England) ENG	(Wales) WAL	(Canada) CAN	(United States) USA	(Australia) AUS	(Romania) ROU	(New Zealand) NZL	(Italy) ITA	(Poland) POL	(Sweden) SWE	Total
Final	1	1	—N/a													2
Semi-finals	1	1	1	1	—N/a											4
Quarter-finals	1	1	2	1	2	1	—N/a									8
Third round	1	1	2	1	2	6	2	—N/a								16
Second round	1	1	2	2	3	15	2	2	2	1	1	—N/a				32
First round	—N/a	—N/a	3	1	1	14	1	3	1	2	1	2	1	1	1	32
Total	1	1	4	2	3	20	3	3	3	3	1	2	1	1	1	48

=== Women's ===
	(England) ENG	(Wales) WAL	(Netherlands) NED	(Australia) AUS	(Japan) JPN	(Hungary) HUN	(Sweden) SWE	(New Zealand) NZL	(Scotland) SCO	(Canada) CAN	(United States) USA	Total
Final	2	—N/a										2
Semi-finals	3	1	—N/a									4
Quarter-finals	4	1	2	1	—N/a							8
Second round	6	1	4	2	1	1	1	—N/a				16
First round	5	1	2	1	1	1	1	1	1	1	1	16
Total	10	1	4	2	1	1	1	1	1	1	1	24

=== Boys ===
	(England) ENG	(Netherlands) NED	(Germany) GER	Total
Final	1	1	—N/a	2
Semi-finals	2	1	1	4
Total	2	1	1	4

=== Girls ===
	(England) ENG	(Germany) GER	Total
Final	1	1	2
Total	1	1	2
