= Priscilla Steenbergen =

Dutch darts player (born 1998)

- Steenbergen in 2025

Personal information
- Nickname: "Smurf"
- Born: 25 July 1998 (age 28) Maasdijk, Westland, Netherlands

Sport
- Sport: Darts
- Playing since: 2016
- Darts: 21g Target ALX 04
- Laterality: Right-handed
- Walk-on music: "Shut Up and Dance" by Walk the Moon

Organisation (see split in darts)
- BDO: 2016–2020
- PDC: 2022–present
- WDF: 2016–present
- Current world ranking: (WDF W) 3 (17 August 2026)

WDF major events – best performances
- World Championship: Semi-final: 2025
- World Masters: Last 16: 2022
- Dutch Open: Winner (1): 2026

Other tournament wins
- Years
Bruges Open	2025
Budapest Masters	2025
Italian Grand Masters	2022
Swedish Open	2025
Youth events
Dutch Open	2016
Medal record
Women's Darts
Representing Netherlands
WDF Europe Cup
Gold medal – first place	2024 Šamorín	Women's team
Gold medal – first place	2024 Šamorín	Women's overall
Silver medal – second place	2022 Gandía	Women's team
Bronze medal – third place	2022 Gandía	Women's overall

Priscilla Steenbergen (born 25 July 1998) is a Dutch professional darts player who competes in World Darts Federation (WDF) and Professional Darts Corporation (PDC) events. Her biggest achievement to date was winning the Dutch Open in 2026. She also reached the semi-finals at the 2025 WDF World Darts Championship. She is a gold medalist at the WDF Europe Cup.

== Career ==
After not being able to qualify for the BDO World Darts Championship from the qualifiers in 2016, she went to the third round at the 2016 World Masters, where she lost to Trina Gulliver by 1–4 in legs. In 2017, she was in the quarter-finals of the Hal Masters. In 2019, she advanced to the quarter-finals at the German Open and made it to the 2019 BDO World Trophy via the play-off qualifiers. During this tournament, she lost in the first round match to Aileen de Graaf by 0–4 in legs. In 2020, Steenbergen made it to the quarter-finals at the 2020 Dutch Open and again to Aileen de Graaf.

In 2022, she took part in the 2022 WDF World Darts Championship for the first time. She replaced Fallon Sherrock after her withdrawal, as the highest ranked World Darts Federation player which not already qualified. In the first round match she beat Darlene van Sleeuwen by 2–1 in sets. In the second round she beat Anca Zijlstra with the same result. In the quarter-finals, she was defeated by Kirsty Hutchinson by 1–2 in sets. After a very good result at the WDF World Darts Championship, she took part in the 2022 PDC Women's Series for the first time. During the series held in Hildesheim, Steenbergen reached the quarter-finals three times. At the Belfry Open, she advanced to the semi-finals of the senior tournament for the first time and finally lost to Aileen de Graaf by 2–4 in legs. At the 2022 Dutch Open she was eliminated in the second round.

At the end of September 2022, she was selected by the national federation to participate in the 2022 WDF Europe Cup. On the second day of the tournament, she advanced to the second round of the singles competition, where she lost to Aurora Fochesato by 2–4 in legs. On the third day, she advanced to the quarter-finals of the pairs competition, where she played together with Noa-Lynn van Leuven. They lost to Anna Forsmark and Maud Jansson from Sweden by 0–4 in legs. In the team tournament, she won a silver medal. They lost in the final match to England by 1–9 in legs. They also took the bronze medal in the overall classification.

On 26 November 2022, Priscilla picked up her first WDF title winning the Italian Grand Masters beating Paula Jacklin in the final 6–5.

== World Championship results ==
=== WDF ===
- 2022: Quarter-finals (lost to Kirsty Hutchinson 1–2) (sets)
- 2023: Second round (lost to Lisa Ashton 1–2)
- 2025: Semi-finals (lost to Deta Hedman 1–3)

== Performance timeline ==
BDO

Tournament	2016	2017	2018	2019
BDO Televised women's events
World Masters	3R	2R	3R	1R
World Trophy	DNQ			1R

WDF

Tournament	2018	2019	2020	2021	2022	2023	2024	2025	2026
WDF Televised women's events
World Championship	Not held				QF	2R	DNQ	SF	
World Masters	Not held				3R	NH	3R	3R	
Dutch Open	2R	QF	QF	NH	2R	DNP	2R	3R	W

Key

Performance Table Legend
W	Won the tournament	F	Finalist	SF	Semifinalist	QF	Quarterfinalist	#R; RR; L#	Lost in # round Round-robin; Last # stage	DQ	Disqualified
DNQ	Did not qualify	DNP	Did not participate	WD	Withdrew	NH	Tournament not held	#R; RR; L#	Lost in # round Round-robin; Last # stage	NYF	Not yet founded
