= Andy Baetens =

Belgian darts player (born 1989)

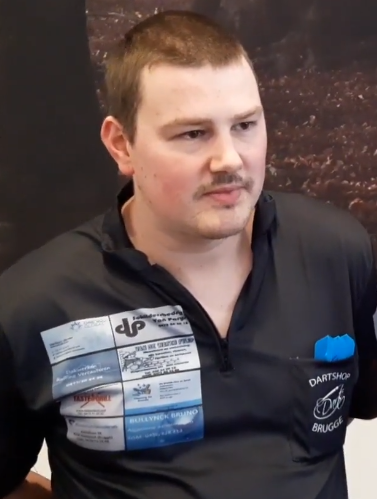
- Baetens in 2022

Personal information
- Nickname: "The Beast from the East"
- Born: 24 February 1989 (age 37) Nieuwerkerken, East Flanders, Belgium
- Home town: Erembodegem, East Flanders, Belgium

Sport
- Sport: Darts
- Playing since: 2014
- Darts: 22g Bull's NL
- Laterality: Right-handed
- Walk-on music: "Kernkraft 400" by Zombie Nation

Organisation (see split in darts)
- BDO: 2014–2020
- PDC: 2019–present (Tour Card: 2024–2025)
- WDF: 2014–2023, 2026–present
- Current world ranking: (PDC) 136 (18 October 2026)

WDF major events – best performances
- World Championship: Winner (1): 2023
- World Masters: Last 32: 2022
- World Trophy: Last 16: 2018
- Finder Masters: Last 24: 2016, 2017
- Australian Open: Winner (1): 2023
- Dutch Open: Runner-up: 2023

PDC premier events – best performances
- World Championship: Last 128: 2026
- UK Open: Last 128: 2024
- Masters: Last 32: 2025

Other tournament wins
- Years
Belgium Masters	2017
Bruges Open	2022, 2023
Belfry Open	2023
Catalonia Open	2021
Croatian Masters	2023
Croatian Open	2023
Czech Open	2016, 2021, 2022, 2023
Denmark Masters	2023
Denmark Open	2023
England Masters	2017
FCD Anniversary Open	2021
Romanian Classic	2017
Medal record
Men's Darts
Representing Belgium
WDF Europe Cup
Bronze medal – third place	2022 Gandía	Men's singles

Andy Baetens (born 24 February 1989) is a Belgian professional darts player who competes in Professional Darts Corporation (PDC) and World Darts Federation (WDF) events. He won the WDF World Championip in 2023 to become the first Belgian player to win a world title. Baetens is also a four-time winner of the Czech Open and the 2023 Australian Darts Open champion. He was also the runner-up at the 2023 Dutch Open and a bronze medalist at the 2022 WDF Europe Cup. From May 2023 to January 2024, he was ranked number one in the World Darts Federation men's ranking.

== Career ==
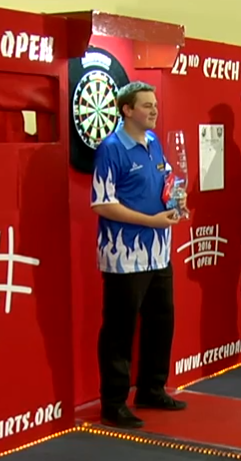
Baetens after winning the 2016 Czech Open

Baetens took part in his first international tournaments shortly after he started playing darts. He reached the quarter-finals at the 2015 Antwerp Open. In 2016, he reached the quarter-finals of the Polish Open. With his final victory over Darryl Fitton at the 2016 Czech Open, Baetens was able to win his first title in the British Darts Organisation (BDO) before he finally made his breakthrough on the tour in 2017.

By winning the Romanian Classic, Belgium Masters and England Masters, Baetens was able to qualify for his first BDO World Darts Championship at the 2018 event. He also reached the semi-finals of the German Masters and the final of the Denmark Open. At the 2018 BDO World Championship, he entered the tournament in 13th place on the seeding list and defeated Scott Baker in the first round. In second round, he defeated Scott Mitchell 4–2 in sets. In the quarter-finals, Baetens missed six match darts and lost to Scott Waites 5–4.

Baetens returned to international tournaments at the 2020 Dutch Open, where he made the quarter-finals. He beat Dirk van Duijvenbode and Mario Vandenbogaerde before being eliminated by Brian Raman in a deciding leg in their quarter-final match. In September 2021, he won the Catalonia Open and FCD Anniversary Open. In November 2021, he won the Czech Open for a second time.

In April 2022, he played at the 2022 WDF World Darts Championship. In the first round he beat Dave Parletti 3–1. In the second round he beat Scott Marsh. His three-dart average for the match of 102.79 was the third highest ever at the Lakeside. In the quarter-finals he played Thibault Tricole and lost 4–3.

At the end of September, Baetens qualified for the 2022 Belgian Darts Open via the Host Nation Qualifier, but lost in the first round to Madars Razma. After a few weeks, Baetens won a title at the Bruges Open. In November 2022, he won the Czech Open for the third time, defeating Antony Allen 5–0 in the final. He qualified for the 2022 World Masters, where he reached the fourth round.

In May 2023, Baetens became the new number one ranked player on the WDF World Rankings.

At the 2023 WDF World Championship, he defeated Sebastian Białecki, Gary Stone and Jonny Tata to the reach his first world championship semi-final, the first for a Belgian at the Lakeside. He then beat Dennis Nilsson to become the first Belgian in a world darts championship final. In the final, he beat Chris Landman to win his first world title.

In January 2024, Baetens entered PDC European Q-School, earning an automatic two-year PDC Tour Card following victory in the final on day three of the second stage.

Baetens qualified for the 2025 PDC World Masters after defeating Darius Labanauskas in the final preliminary round. He lost 3–0 to world champion Luke Littler in the first round.

== Career finals ==
=== WDF major finals: 1 (1 title) ===
Legend
World Championship (1–0)

Outcome	No.	Year	Championship	Opponent in the final	Score (Note: (l) = score in legs, (s) = score in sets.)
Winner	1.	2023	World Championship	(Netherlands) Chris Landman	6–1 (s)

== World Championship results ==
=== BDO ===
- 2018: Quarter-finals (lost to Scott Waites 4–5) (sets)

=== WDF ===
- 2022: Quarter-finals (lost to Thibault Tricole 3–4) (sets)
- 2023: Winner (beat Chris Landman 6–1)

=== PDC ===
- 2026: First round (lost to Dirk van Duijvenbode 2–3)

== Performance timeline ==
=== BDO ===
Tournament	2016	2017	2018
BDO Ranked televised events
World Championship	DNQ		QF
World Trophy	DNQ		2R
Finde Masters	RR	RR	DNP

=== WDF ===
Tournament	2017	2018	2020	2022	2023	2026
WDF Ranked major/platinum events
World Championship	Not held			QF	W	
Australian Open	Not held			DNP	W	
World Masters	DNQ		NH	4R	NH	
Dutch Open (Note: A non-ranked event until 2020)	3R	QF	QF	7R	F	1R
WDF Year-end ranking	–			5	1	

=== PDC ===
Tournament	2024	2025	2026
PDC Ranked televised events
World Championship	DNQ		1R
World Masters (Note: A non-ranked event until 2025)	DNQ	1R	DNQ
UK Open	2R	2R	DNQ
Career statistics
Season-end ranking (PDC)	95	78	

==== PDC European Tour ====
Season	1	2	3	4	5	6	7	8	9	10	11	12	13	14	15
2022	Did not participate											BDO; 1R	GDT; DNP		
2023	Did not participate						BDO; 3R	Did not participate							
2024	DNQ					BSD; 2R	DDC; DNQ	EDO; 2R	Did not qualify						
2025	Did not qualify								BSD; 3R	Did not qualify					
2026	DNP		BDO; QF	Did not participate									FDT; 2R	DNP	

==== PDC Players Championships ====
Season	1	2	3	4	5	6	7	8	9	10	11	12	13	14	15	16	17	18	19	20	21	22	23	24	25	26	27	28	29	30	31	32	33	34
2024	WIG; 3R	WIG; 4R	LEI; 1R	LEI; 2R	HIL; 1R	HIL; 1R	LEI; 1R	LEI; 2R	HIL; 2R	HIL; 2R	HIL; 2R	HIL; 4R	MIL; 1R	MIL; 2R	MIL; 3R	MIL; 1R	MIL; 1R	MIL; 2R	MIL; 1R	WIG; 1R	WIG; 2R	MIL; 1R	MIL; 1R	WIG; 2R	WIG; 1R	WIG; 1R	WIG; 1R	WIG; 1R	LEI; 1R	LEI; 3R				
2025	WIG; 1R	WIG; 1R	ROS; 1R	ROS; 2R	LEI; 2R	LEI; 1R	HIL; 2R	HIL; 1R	LEI; 3R	LEI; 1R	LEI; 1R	LEI; 1R	ROS; 3R	ROS; 1R	HIL; 1R	HIL; 1R	LEI; 1R	LEI; 1R	LEI; 1R	LEI; 1R	LEI; 3R	HIL; 1R	HIL; 4R	MIL; 2R	MIL; 1R	HIL; 4R	HIL; 2R	LEI; 1R	LEI; 3R	LEI; 3R	WIG; 1R	WIG; 1R	WIG; 1R	WIG; 1R

Performance Table Legend
W	Won the tournament	F	Finalist	SF	Semifinalist	QF	Quarterfinalist	#R; RR; Prel.	Lost in # round Round-robin; Preliminary round	DQ	Disqualified
DNQ	Did not qualify	DNP	Did not participate	WD	Withdrew	NH	Tournament not held	#R; RR; Prel.	Lost in # round Round-robin; Preliminary round	NYF	Not yet founded
