= Thibault Tricole =

French darts player (born 1989)

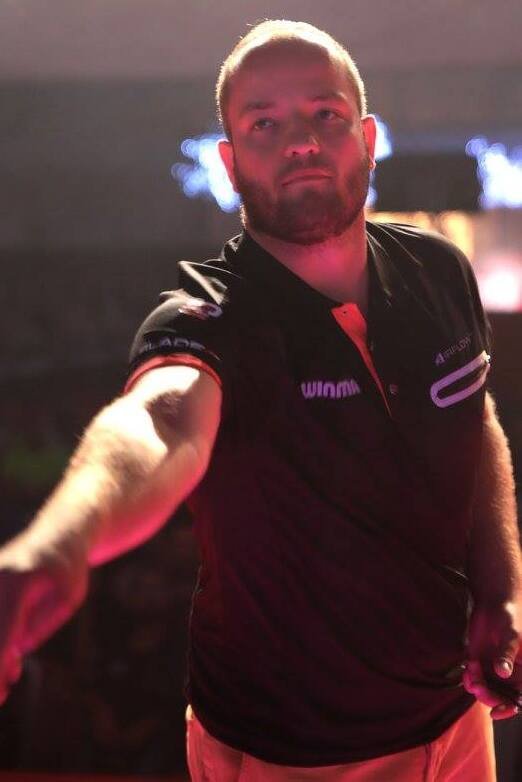
- Tricole in 2018

Personal information
- Nickname: "The French Touch"
- Born: 11 October 1989 (age 37) Auray, France
- Home town: Malguénac, France

Sport
- Sport: Darts
- Playing since: 2002
- Darts: 23g Winmau Signature
- Laterality: Right-handed
- Walk-on music: "Essentielles" by Ibrahim Maalouf

Organisation (see split in darts)
- BDO: 2010–2020
- PDC: 2021–present (Tour Card: 2024–present)
- WDF: 2010–2023
- Current world ranking: (PDC) 72 (5 November 2026)

WDF major events – best performances
- World Championship: Runner-up: 2022
- World Masters: Last 32: 2019
- Dutch Open: Semi-final: 2022

PDC premier events – best performances
- World Championship: Last 64: 2024, 2025
- UK Open: Last 96: 2024
- PC Finals: Last 32: 2024

Other tournament wins
- Years
Denmark Open	2021
Greek Open	2019
Isle of Man Masters	2020
Italian Open	2022
PDC Challenge Tour (x2)	2022, 2023
PDC West Europe Qualifier	2023
Torremolinos Open	2019
Welsh Classic	2021

Thibault Tricole (born 11 October 1989) is a French professional darts player who competes in Professional Darts Corporation (PDC) events. Nicknamed "the French Touch", Tricole was the runner-up at the 2022 WDF World Championship, where he lost to Neil Duff in the final. Regarded as the best French player in the sport's history, he is the holder of several milestones for French darts: the first French player to reach a World Championship final, the first French player to compete at the PDC World Championship, and the first French player to win a match on the PDC European Tour. He was also the second French player to earn a PDC Tour Card after Jacques Labre.

== Career ==
Tricole has been playing darts since the age of 12, and won the French Darts Federation's junior title in his youth. He started playing in British Darts Organisation (BDO) tournaments in 2010, including multiple appearances at the World Masters. In 2019, he attended PDC Q-School for the first time, but was unable to secure a PDC Tour Card. During the year, he played significantly more BDO tournaments than in previous years and was able to win his first tournaments at the Torremolinos Open and Greek Open. He also reached the fourth round at the 2019 World Masters. He was also in finals at the Belfry Open, Malta Open and Italian Open.

In 2020, Tricole became the first French player to qualify for the BDO World Darts Championship as a Western European Qualifier. In the preliminary round he beat Ross Montgomery in a sudden-death leg. In the first round, Tricole lost 1–3 in sets to Ryan Hogarth. Tricole narrowly missed out on a Tour Card at Q-School in January 2020, but he won the Isle of Man Masters in March. In 2021, Tricole reached the semi-finals on the PDC Challenge Tour once. At the beginning of October, he won the Denmark Open with a 6–3 win over Andreas Harrysson in the final and he later won the Welsh Classic.

In 2022, he attempted Q-School once again, but was unsuccessful in winning a Tour Card. At the end of March, Tricole got called up to his first two Players Championships on the 2022 PDC Pro Tour due to his ranking on the Challenge Tour. In April, Tricole went into the 2022 WDF World Darts Championship as a seed and survived match darts in his first match against Shawn Burt. He improved against Steve Hine, whom he defeated 3–1 in sets. He narrowly eliminated Andy Baetens 4–3 in the quarter-finals and defeated Cameron Menzies in a deciding set in the semi-finals, thus reaching the final. Tricole managed to become the first French player to reach a World Darts Championship final where he ended up being defeated by Neil Duff 5–6.

In his PDC European Tour debut at the 2022 Austrian Darts Open, Tricole lost in a deciding leg against Zoran Lerchbacher. His second European Tour appearance was at the 2022 Hungarian Darts Trophy, where he lost 4–6 in legs to Karel Sedláček in the first round. In June, Tricole took part in the 2022 Dutch Open and reached the semi-finals, where he lost to eventual champion Jelle Klaasen 1–2 in sets.

In November 2023, he took part in the West Europe Qualifier for the 2023 PDC World Darts Championship. He won the tournament by defeating Wesley Plaisier in the final 7–4 in legs. Tricole became the first person to represent France at the PDC World Darts Championship before becoming the first French player to claim a victory at the competition, defeating Mario Vandenbogaerde 3–1 in the first round before a 3–0 defeat to Rob Cross in the second round. Following the tournament, he attended European Q-School and earned a PDC Tour Card, becoming the second French player to become a professional after Jacques Labre.

In November 2024, he beat former PDC World Champion Gerwyn Price 6–4 in the first round of the 2024 Players Championship Finals. At the 2025 PDC World Darts Championship, Tricole played Australia's Joe Comito in the opening match of the tournament, with the winner to face reigning champion Luke Humphries in the second round later in the evening. He began with a 3–1 win over Comito but was defeated 3–0 by Humphries, who won all nine legs. At the 2025 International Darts Open, Tricole became the first French player to win a match on the European Tour by defeating former world champion Michael Smith in the first round.

== Personal life ==
Tricole previously worked as a landscape gardener, quitting in 2019 to pursue darts full time. Having previously lived in Belgium, Tricole lives in Malguénac, Brittany with his wife and son.

Tricole is a supporter of French football club FC Lorient and signed a partnership deal with the club in October 2024.

== World Championship results ==
=== BDO ===
- 2020: First round (lost to Ryan Hogarth 1–3)

=== WDF ===
- 2022: Runner-up (lost to Neil Duff 5–6)

=== PDC ===
- 2024: Second round (lost to Rob Cross 0–3)
- 2025: Second round (lost to Luke Humphries 0–3)
- 2026: First round (lost to Motomu Sakai 0–3)

== Career finals ==
=== WDF major finals: (1 runner-up) ===
Legend
World Championship (0–1)

Outcome	No.	Year	Championship	Opponent in the final	Score (Note: (l) = score in legs, (s) = score in sets.)
Runner-up	1.	2022	World Championship	(Northern Ireland) Neil Duff	5–6 (s)

== Performance timeline ==
=== BDO ===
Tournament	2010	2012	2013	2014	2015	2016	2017	2018	2019	2020
BDO Ranked televised events
World Championship	Did not qualify									1R
World Masters	1R	2R	1R	1R	1R	1R	3R	3R	4R	NH

=== WDF ===
Tournament	2018	2022
WDF Ranked televised events
World Championship	NH	F
World Masters	NH	RR
Dutch Open	5R	SF

=== PDC ===
Tournament	2023	2024	2025	2026
PDC Ranked televised events
World Championship	DNQ	2R	2R	1R
World Masters	DNQ		Prel.	WD
UK Open	1R	3R	2R	4R
Players Championship Finals	DNQ	2R	DNQ	
PDC Non-ranked televised events
World Cup	QF	2R	RR	2R
Career statistics
Season-end ranking (PDC)	112	74	61	

==== PDC European Tour ====
Season	1	2	3	4	5	6	7	8	9	10	11	12	13	14	15
2022	DNP			ADO; 1R	Did not participate					HDT; 1R	DNP				
2024	Did not qualify					BSD; 1R	Did not qualify								
2025	BDO; 1R	EDT; DNQ	IDO; 2R	GDG; DNQ	ADO; 2R	Did not qualify						HDT; 3R	SDT; DNQ	GDC; DNQ	
2026	DNQ		BDO; 1R	Did not qualify											

==== PDC Players Championships ====
Season	1	2	3	4	5	6	7	8	9	10	11	12	13	14	15	16	17	18	19	20	21	22	23	24	25	26	27	28	29	30	31	32	33	34
2022 (Note: Not a Tour card holder)	DNP						NIE; 1R	NIE; 1R	DNP							NIE; 2R	NIE; 3R	DNP											BAR; 3R	BAR; 1R				
2023	BAR; 1R	BAR; 1R	BAR; 1R	BAR; 1R	BAR; 1R	BAR; 1R	HIL; 2R	HIL; 3R	WIG; 2R	WIG; 3R	LEI; DNP	LEI; DNP	HIL; 4R	HIL; 1R	LEI; 1R	LEI; 1R	HIL; 1R	HIL; 1R	DNP															
2024	WIG; 2R	WIG; 1R	LEI; 3R	LEI; 1R	HIL; 1R	HIL; 2R	LEI; QF	LEI; 2R	HIL; 3R	HIL; 4R	HIL; 1R	HIL; 1R	MIL; 1R	MIL; 1R	MIL; 1R	MIL; 3R	MIL; 1R	MIL; 1R	MIL; SF	WIG; 3R	WIG; 4R	MIL; 3R	MIL; 2R	WIG; 2R	WIG; 3R	WIG; 2R	WIG; 2R	WIG; 1R	LEI; 2R	LEI; 4R				
2025	WIG; 1R	WIG; 2R	ROS; 1R	ROS; 1R	LEI; 1R	LEI; 3R	HIL; 2R	HIL; 1R	LEI; 1R	LEI; 1R	LEI; 1R	LEI; 1R	ROS; 1R	ROS; 2R	HIL; 3R	HIL; 3R	LEI; QF	LEI; 2R	LEI; 1R	LEI; 1R	LEI; 3R	HIL; 2R	HIL; 2R	MIL; 1R	MIL; 1R	HIL; 2R	HIL; 2R	LEI; 1R	LEI; 1R	LEI; 2R	WIG; 1R	WIG; 1R	WIG; QF	WIG; 1R
2026	HIL; 2R	HIL; 2R	WIG; 2R	WIG; 1R	LEI; 3R	LEI; SF	LEI; 1R	LEI; 2R	WIG; 1R	WIG; 1R	MIL; 2R	MIL; 1R	HIL; 3R	HIL; 1R	LEI; 1R	LEI; 2R	LEI; 1R	LEI; 2R	MIL; 1R	MIL; 1R	WIG; 1R	WIG; 2R	LEI; 2R	LEI; 1R	HIL; 1R	HIL; 1R	LEI; 1R	LEI; 1R	ROS; 1R	ROS; 1R	ROS; 1R	ROS; 1R	LEI; 2R	LEI; 1R

Performance Table Legend
W	Won the tournament	F	Finalist	SF	Semifinalist	QF	Quarterfinalist	#R; RR; Prel.	Lost in # round Round-robin; Preliminary round	DQ	Disqualified
DNQ	Did not qualify	DNP	Did not participate	WD	Withdrew	NH	Tournament not held	#R; RR; Prel.	Lost in # round Round-robin; Preliminary round	NYF	Not yet founded
