= Denmark Open (darts) =

Tournament information
- Venue: Granly Hockey Arena
- Location: Esbjerg
- Country: Denmark
- Established: 1974
- Organisation(s): WDF
- Format: Legs
- Prize fund: DKK 146,300

Current champion(s)
- Mitchell Lawrie (men's); Deta Hedman (women's)

The Denmark Open is a darts tournament that has been held since 1974 in Denmark.

== List of winners ==
=== Men's ===
Year	Champion	Av.	Score	Runner-Up	Av.	Prize Money			Venue
Year	Champion	Av.	Score	Runner-Up	Av.	Total	Ch.	R.-Up	Venue
1974	(England) Bill Geary	n/a	beat	(England) Cyril Hayes	n/a	n/a	n/a	n/a	
1975	(Wales) Alf Jeffries	n/a	beat	(England) Martin Humphrey	n/a	n/a	n/a	n/a	
1976	(England) Martin Humphrey	n/a	beat	(England) Cyril Hayes	n/a	n/a	n/a	n/a	
1977	(Sweden) Stefan Lord	n/a	beat	(England) Ernie Hall	n/a	n/a	n/a	n/a	
1978	(England) John Lowe	n/a	beat	(England) Charlie Ellix	n/a	n/a	n/a	n/a	
1979	(England) John Lowe (2)	n/a	3 – 0	(England) Bobby George	n/a	n/a	n/a	n/a	
1980	(England) Eric Bristow	n/a	beat	(England) John Lowe	n/a	n/a	n/a	n/a	
1981	(England) Cliff Lazarenko	n/a	3 – 1	(England) Bobby George	n/a	n/a	n/a	n/a	
1982	(England) John Lowe (3)	n/a	3 – 0	(Finland) Tapani Uitos	n/a	n/a	n/a	n/a	
1983	(England) Cliff Lazarenko (2)	n/a	3 – 2	(Scotland) Jocky Wilson	n/a	n/a	n/a	n/a	
1984	(England) Eric Bristow (2)	n/a	beat	(Scotland) Jocky Wilson	n/a	n/a	n/a	n/a	
1985	(England) John Lowe (4)	n/a	5 – 3	(England) Eric Bristow	n/a	n/a	n/a	n/a	
1986	(England) Bob Anderson	n/a	beat	(England) Mike Gregory	n/a	n/a	n/a	n/a	
1987	(England) John Lowe (5)	n/a	beat	(England) Mike Gregory	n/a	n/a	n/a	n/a	Copenhagen
1988	(England) Dave Askew	n/a	6 – 0	(England) Cliff Lazarenko	n/a	n/a	n/a	n/a	Copenhagen
1989	(England) Eric Bristow (3)	n/a	5 – 2	(England) Kevin Burrows	n/a	n/a	n/a	n/a	Copenhagen
1990	(England) Phil Taylor	n/a	beat	(England) Dave Whitcombe	n/a	n/a	n/a	n/a	Copenhagen
1991	(England) Rod Harrington	n/a	5 – 4	(England) Phil Taylor	n/a	n/a	n/a	n/a	Copenhagen
1992	(England) Rod Harrington (2)	n/a	5 – 4	(England) Kevin Painter	n/a	n/a	n/a	n/a	Copenhagen
1993	(England) Steve Beaton	n/a	beat	(England) Ronnie Baxter	n/a	n/a	n/a	n/a	Copenhagen
1994	(Wales) Richie Burnett	n/a	5 – 4	(England) Kevin Painter	n/a	n/a	n/a	n/a	Copenhagen
1995	(England) Colin Monk	n/a	5 – 2	(England) Martin Adams	n/a	n/a	n/a	n/a	Copenhagen
1996	(England) Ronnie Baxter	n/a	beat	(Belgium) Leo Laurens	n/a	n/a	n/a	n/a	Copenhagen
1997	(Netherlands) Raymond van Barneveld	n/a	beat	(England) Ronnie Baxter	n/a	n/a	n/a	n/a	Copenhagen
1998	(England) Rod Harrington (3)	n/a	5 – 2	(England) Peter Manley	n/a	n/a	n/a	n/a	Odense
1999	(Scotland) Peter Johnstone	n/a	beat	(England) Denis Ovens	n/a	n/a	n/a	n/a	Copenhagen
2000	(England) Martin Adams	n/a	5 – 3	(England) Colin Monk	n/a	n/a	n/a	n/a	Copenhagen
2001	(England) Wayne Mardle	n/a	beat	(Finland) Jarkko Komula	n/a	n/a	n/a	n/a	Copenhagen
2002	(Netherlands) Vincent van der Voort	n/a	beat	(England) Gary Robson	n/a	n/a	n/a	n/a	Copenhagen
2003	(England) Ted Hankey	n/a	5 – 4	(England) Tony Eccles	n/a	n/a	n/a	n/a	Copenhagen
2004	(Scotland) Gary Anderson	n/a	5 – 3	(Scotland) Mike Veitch	n/a	DKK 28,000	DKK 10,000	DKK 5,000	Copenhagen
2005	(England) Shaun Greatbatch	n/a	beat	(England) Tony Eccles	n/a	DKK 28,000	DKK 10,000	DKK 5,000	Copenhagen
2006	(Netherlands) Vincent van der Voort (2)	n/a	beat	(Denmark) Per Laursen	n/a	DKK 28,000	DKK 10,000	DKK 5,000	Copenhagen
2007	(England) Steve West	n/a	5 – 2	(England) James Wilson	n/a	DKK 28,000	DKK 10,000	DKK 5,000	Copenhagen
2008	(Poland) Krzysztof Ratajski	n/a	beat	(Netherlands) Fabian Roosenbrand	n/a	DKK 28,000	DKK 10,000	DKK 5,000	Scandic Hotel Copenhagen, Copenhagen
2009	(England) Ian White	n/a	beat	(England) Darryl Fitton	n/a	DKK 28,000	DKK 10,000	DKK 5,000	Scandic Hotel Copenhagen, Copenhagen
2010	(England) Clive Barden	n/a	5 – 2	(Denmark) Preben Krabben	n/a	DKK 28,000	DKK 10,000	DKK 5,000	Farum Arena, Farum
2011	(England) Steve West (2)	n/a	beat	(Denmark) Vladimir Andersen	n/a	DKK 28,000	DKK 10,000	DKK 5,000	Esbjerg Conference Hotel, Esbjerg
2012	(England) Paul Jennings	n/a	beat	(Norway) Robert Wagner	n/a	DKK 41,000	DKK 20,000	DKK 8,000	Esbjerg Conference Hotel, Esbjerg
2013	Jeffrey de Graaf	n/a	beat	(Netherlands) Jan Dekker	n/a	DKK 41,000	DKK 20,000	DKK 8,000	Esbjerg Conference Hotel, Esbjerg
2014	(England) Alan Norris	n/a	6 – 5	Jeffrey de Graaf	n/a	DKK 41,000	DKK 20,000	DKK 10,000	Esbjerg Conference Hotel, Esbjerg
2015	(England) Glen Durrant	n/a	6 – 1	(England) Pip Blackwell	n/a	DKK 70,200	DKK 30,000	DKK 15,000	Blue Water Dokken, Esbjerg
2016	(Lithuania) Darius Labanauskas	n/a	6 – 5	(Belgium) Davy Van Baelen	n/a	DKK 70,200	DKK 30,000	DKK 15,000	Blue Water Dokken, Esbjerg
2017	(England) Scott Mitchell	101.68	6 – 1	(Belgium) Andy Baetens	88.83	DKK 70,200	DKK 30,000	DKK 15,000	Blue Water Dokken, Esbjerg
2018	(Netherlands) Willem Mandigers	92.62	6 – 3	(England) Mark McGeeney	86.47	DKK 70,200	DKK 30,000	DKK 15,000	Blue Water Dokken, Esbjerg
2019	(Netherlands) Wesley Harms	105.03	6 – 3	(Netherlands) Willem Mandigers	93.30	DKK 86,400	DKK 36,000	DKK 17,000	Blue Water Dokken, Esbjerg
2021	(France) Thibault Tricole	88.38	6 – 3	(Sweden) Andreas Harrysson	80.03	DKK 88,200	DKK 23,000	DKK 10,000	Granly Hockey Arena, Esbjerg
2022	Sebastian Białecki	87.94	6 – 1	(England) Darren Johnson	86.83	DKK 96,800	DKK 24,000	DKK 12,000	Granly Hockey Arena, Esbjerg
2023	Andy Baetens	100.78	6 – 2	Neil Duff	87.59	DKK 84,800	DKK 24,000	DKK 12,000	Granly Hockey Arena, Esbjerg
2024	Connor Scutt	98.97	6 – 1	Jimmy van Schie	83.19	DKK 96,800	DKK 24,000	DKK 12,000	Granly Hockey Arena, Esbjerg
2025	James Beeton	80.84	6 – 2	François Schweyen	77.13	DKK 96,800	DKK 24,000	DKK 12,000	Granly Hockey Arena, Esbjerg
2026	Mitchell Lawrie	93.61	6 – 2	Jarno Bottenberg	81.38	DKK 87,200	DKK 22,000	DKK 11,000	Granly Hockey Arena, Esbjerg

=== Women's ===
Year	Champion	Av.	Score	Runner-Up	Av.	Prize Money			Venue
Year	Champion	Av.	Score	Runner-Up	Av.	Total	Ch.	R.-Up	Venue
1976	(Denmark) Hanne Plambeck	n/a	beat	(Denmark) Lotte Villekær	n/a	n/a	n/a	n/a	
1977	(Sweden) Eva Johansson	n/a	beat	(Sweden) Britt Ericson	n/a	n/a	n/a	n/a	
1978	(Wales) Janet Dewan	n/a	beat	(Sweden) Mia Jansson	n/a	n/a	n/a	n/a	
1979	(Sweden) Mia Jansson	n/a	beat	(Scotland) Jennifer James	n/a	n/a	n/a	n/a	
1980	(England) Maureen Flowers	n/a	beat	(England) Sharon Kemp	n/a	n/a	n/a	n/a	
1981	(England) Maureen Flowers (2)	n/a	beat	(England) Linda Batten	n/a	n/a	n/a	n/a	
1982	(England) Maureen Flowers (3)	n/a	beat	(England) Linda Batten	n/a	n/a	n/a	n/a	
1983	(England) Maureen Flowers (4)	n/a	beat	(England) Audrie Derham	n/a	n/a	n/a	n/a	
1984	(Wales) Sandra Gibb-Lee	n/a	beat	(England) Pat Connaughton	n/a	n/a	n/a	n/a	
1985	(England) Linda Batten	n/a	beat	(England) Pat Connaughton	n/a	n/a	n/a	n/a	
1986	(Sweden) Carina Sahlberg	n/a	beat	(England) Sharon Colclough	n/a	n/a	n/a	n/a	
1987	(Scotland) Cathie McCulloch	n/a	beat	(Sweden) Maarit Fagerholm	n/a	n/a	n/a	n/a	Copenhagen
1988	(England) Mandy Solomons	n/a	beat	(Denmark) Gerda Søgaard-Weltz	n/a	n/a	n/a	n/a	Copenhagen
1989	(England) Sharon Colclough	n/a	beat	(England) Jane Stubbs	n/a	n/a	n/a	n/a	Copenhagen
1990	(England) Sharon Colclough (2)	n/a	beat	(England) Deta Hedman	n/a	n/a	n/a	n/a	Copenhagen
1991	(England) Mandy Solomons (2)	n/a	beat	(Germany) Michelle Thornhill	n/a	n/a	n/a	n/a	Copenhagen
1992	(Germany) Heike Jenkins	n/a	beat	(Denmark) Ann-Louise Peters	n/a	n/a	n/a	n/a	Copenhagen
1993	(England) Mandy Solomons (3)	n/a	beat	(England) Deta Hedman	n/a	n/a	n/a	n/a	Copenhagen
1994	(England) Deta Hedman	n/a	beat	(Germany) Heike Jenkins	n/a	n/a	n/a	n/a	Copenhagen
1995	(England) Deta Hedman (2)	n/a	beat	(Netherlands) Francis Hoenselaar	n/a	n/a	n/a	n/a	Copenhagen
1996	(Denmark) Gerda Søgaard-Weltz	n/a	beat	(England) Sharon Colclough	n/a	n/a	n/a	n/a	Copenhagen
1997	(Netherlands) Francis Hoenselaar	n/a	beat	(England) Sharon Colclough	n/a	n/a	n/a	n/a	Copenhagen
1998	(Netherlands) Francis Hoenselaar (2)	n/a	beat	(England) Trina Gulliver	n/a	n/a	n/a	n/a	Odense
1999	(England) Trina Gulliver	n/a	beat	(England) Sharon Colclough	n/a	n/a	n/a	n/a	Copenhagen
2000	(Netherlands) Francis Hoenselaar (3)	n/a	4 – 3	(England) Trina Gulliver	n/a	n/a	n/a	n/a	Copenhagen
2001	(Finland) Tarja Salminen	n/a	beat	(England) Juliet Curley	n/a	n/a	n/a	n/a	Copenhagen
2002	(Netherlands) Francis Hoenselaar (4)	n/a	beat	(Netherlands) Karin Krappen	n/a	n/a	n/a	n/a	Copenhagen
2003	(England) Barbara Lee	n/a	beat	(Netherlands) Mieke de Boer	n/a	n/a	n/a	n/a	Copenhagen
2004	(England) Trina Gulliver (2)	n/a	4 – 3	(Finland) Tarja Salminen	n/a	n/a	n/a	n/a	Copenhagen
2005	(England) Trina Gulliver (3)	n/a	beat	(Netherlands) Francis Hoenselaar	n/a	n/a	n/a	n/a	Copenhagen
2006	(England) Trina Gulliver (4)	n/a	beat	(Finland) Tarja Salminen	n/a	n/a	n/a	n/a	Copenhagen
2007	(Netherlands) Francis Hoenselaar (5)	n/a	beat	(England) Trina Gulliver	n/a	n/a	n/a	n/a	Copenhagen
2008	(Wales) Julie Gore	n/a	beat	(Germany) Irina Armstrong	n/a	n/a	n/a	n/a	Scandic Hotel Copenhagen, Copenhagen
2009	(Sweden) Carina Ekberg	n/a	beat	(Sweden) Gretel Glasö	n/a	n/a	n/a	n/a	Scandic Hotel Copenhagen, Copenhagen
2010	(Sweden) Carina Ekberg (2)	n/a	4 – 1	(Sweden) Jessika Petersson	n/a	n/a	n/a	n/a	Farum Arena, Farum
2011	(Germany) Irina Armstrong	n/a	beat	(England) Deta Hedman	n/a	n/a	n/a	n/a	Esbjerg Conference Hotel, Esbjerg
2012	(Germany) Irina Armstrong (2)	n/a	beat	(Norway) Rachna David	n/a	n/a	n/a	n/a	Esbjerg Conference Hotel, Esbjerg
2013	(Netherlands) Aileen de Graaf	n/a	beat	(England) Fallon Sherrock	n/a	n/a	n/a	n/a	Esbjerg Conference Hotel, Esbjerg
2014	(England) Deta Hedman (3)	n/a	beat	(England) Rachel Brooks	n/a	n/a	n/a	n/a	Esbjerg Conference Hotel, Esbjerg
2015	(Netherlands) Aileen de Graaf (2)	n/a	5 – 2	(England) Deta Hedman	n/a	n/a	n/a	n/a	Blue Water Dokken, Esbjerg
2016	(England) Deta Hedman (4)	n/a	5 – 3	(Netherlands) Aileen de Graaf	n/a	n/a	n/a	n/a	Blue Water Dokken, Esbjerg
2017	(England) Deta Hedman (5)	n/a	5 – 1	(Netherlands) Aileen de Graaf	n/a	n/a	n/a	n/a	Blue Water Dokken, Esbjerg
2018	(Netherlands) Aileen de Graaf (3)	n/a	5 – 3	(Australia) Corrine Hammond	n/a	n/a	n/a	n/a	Blue Water Dokken, Esbjerg
2019	(England) Fallon Sherrock	88.15	4 – 1	(Japan) Mikuru Suzuki	87.23	DKK 43,900	DKK 17,000	DKK 8,500	Blue Water Dokken, Esbjerg
2021	Anca Zijlstra	71.17	5 – 2	Anastasia Dobromyslova	65.33	DKK 44,800	DKK 14,000	DKK 6,000	Granly Hockey Arena, Esbjerg
2022	Deta Hedman (6)	71.19	5 – 3	Anca Zijlstra	69.56	DKK 42,400	DKK 12,000	DKK 6,000	Granly Hockey Arena, Esbjerg
2023	Noa-Lynn van Leuven	66.76	5 – 2	Irina Armstrong	65.76	DKK 36,400	DKK 12,000	DKK 6,000	Granly Hockey Arena, Esbjerg
2024	Beau Greaves	93.57	5 – 2	Lorraine Hyde	78.64	DKK 42,400	DKK 12,000	DKK 6,000	Granly Hockey Arena, Esbjerg
2025	Lorraine Hyde	67.74	5 – 4	Emine Dursun	69.02	DKK 42,400	DKK 12,000	DKK 6,000	Granly Hockey Arena, Esbjerg
2026	Deta Hedman	71.79	5 – 2	Zehra Gemi	67.66	DKK 38,100	DKK 11,000	DKK 5,500	Granly Hockey Arena, Esbjerg

=== Youth's ===
Year	Champion	Av.	Score	Runner-Up	Av.	Prize Money			Venue
Year	Champion	Av.	Score	Runner-Up	Av.	Total	Ch.	R.-Up	Venue
2012	(Denmark) Nicolai Rasmussen	n/a	beat	(Denmark) Casper Rasmussen	n/a	–	–	–	Esbjerg Conference Hotel, Esbjerg
2013	(Denmark) Daniel Thybol	n/a	beat	(Denmark) Nicolai Rasmussen	n/a	–	–	–	Esbjerg Conference Hotel, Esbjerg
2014	(Netherlands) Berry van Peer	n/a	beat	(Denmark) Nicolai Rasmussen	n/a	–	–	–	Esbjerg Conference Hotel, Esbjerg
2015	(Denmark) Andreas Bergø	n/a	beat	(Netherlands) Jaimy van Bavel	n/a	–	–	–	Blue Water Dokken, Esbjerg
2016	(Netherlands) Justin van Tergouw	n/a	beat	(Netherlands) Maikel Verberk	n/a	–	–	–	Blue Water Dokken, Esbjerg
2017	(Netherlands) Levy Frauenfelder	n/a	beat	(Netherlands) Pim van Bijnen	n/a	–	–	–	Blue Water Dokken, Esbjerg
2018	(Netherlands) Pim van Bijnen	n/a	beat	(Netherlands) Daan Bastiaansen	n/a	–	–	–	Blue Water Dokken, Esbjerg
2019	(England) James Beeton	n/a	beat	(England) Maison Wilson	n/a	–	–	–	Blue Water Dokken, Esbjerg
2021	(Netherlands) Tinus van Tiel	71.54	4 – 1	(Denmark) Nikolaj Jørgensen	72.10	DKK 4,000	DKK 2,000	DKK 1,000	Granly Hockey Arena, Esbjerg
2022	(Denmark) Nikolaj Jørgensen	74.85	4 – 1	(Netherlands) Tinus van Tiel	67.93	DKK 4,000	DKK 2,000	DKK 1,000	Granly Hockey Arena, Esbjerg
2023	(Denmark) Nikolaj Jørgensen (2)	71.57	4 – 0	(Denmark) Lukas Jensen	64.48	DKK 4,000	DKK 2,000	DKK 1,000	Granly Hockey Arena, Esbjerg
2024	(Germany) Janne Eriksson	73.61	4 – 3	(Germany) Nikolas Wirtz	68.67	DKK 4,000	DKK 2,000	DKK 1,000	Granly Hockey Arena, Esbjerg

=== Girls ===
Year	Champion	Av.	Score	Runner-Up	Av.	Prize Money			Venue
Year	Champion	Av.	Score	Runner-Up	Av.	Total	Ch.	R.-Up	Venue
2012	(Denmark) Samantha Krop	n/a	beat	(Denmark) Michelle Lindhardt	n/a	n/a	n/a	n/a	Esbjerg Conference Hotel, Esbjerg
2013	(Denmark) Sofie-Jahn Bendorff	n/a	beat	(Netherlands) Kyana Frauenfelder	n/a	n/a	n/a	n/a	Esbjerg Conference Hotel, Esbjerg
2014	(Denmark) Sofie-Jahn Bendorff (2)	n/a	beat	(Denmark) Michelle Lindhardt	n/a	n/a	n/a	n/a	Esbjerg Conference Hotel, Esbjerg
2015	(Netherlands) Kyana Frauenfelder	n/a	beat	(Denmark) Sofie-Jahn Bendorff	n/a	n/a	n/a	n/a	Blue Water Dokken, Esbjerg
2016	(Denmark) Emma Thomsen	n/a	beat	(Denmark) Anick Sonnichsen	n/a	n/a	n/a	n/a	Blue Water Dokken, Esbjerg
2017	(Denmark) Line Kristiansen	n/a	beat	(Netherlands) Veerle Hamelink	n/a	n/a	n/a	n/a	Blue Water Dokken, Esbjerg
2018	(Russia) Ksenia Klochek	n/a	beat	(Denmark) Line Kristiansen	n/a	n/a	n/a	n/a	Blue Water Dokken, Esbjerg
2019	(Denmark) Anick Sonnichsen	n/a	beat	(Denmark) Sofie Rasmussen	n/a	n/a	n/a	n/a	Blue Water Dokken, Esbjerg

=== Denmark Masters ===
From 2014 a new tournament was created which would coincide with the Denmark Open, this was called the Denmark Masters. Initially a non-ranking event, the Denmark Masters was awarded as a silver ranked tournament by the World Darts Federation in 2021.

Mens

Year	Champion	Av.	Score	Runner-Up	Av.	Prize Money			Venue
Year	Champion	Av.	Score	Runner-Up	Av.	Total	Ch.	R.-Up	Venue
2014	(Sweden) Jeffrey de Graaf	n/a	6-3	(Belgium) Geert De Vos	n/a	n/a	n/a	n/a	
2015	(Sweden) Jeffrey de Graaf (2)	n/a	6-2	(England) Jamie Hughes	n/a	n/a	n/a	n/a	Blue Water Dokken, Esbjerg
2016	(England) Glen Durrant	n/a	6-4	(England) Ryan Joyce	n/a	n/a	n/a	n/a	Blue Water Dokken, Esbjerg
2017	(England) Glen Durrant (2)	n/a	6-2	(Netherlands) Yoeri Duijster	n/a	n/a	n/a	n/a	Blue Water Dokken, Esbjerg
2018	(England) Scott Mitchell	n/a	6-3	(Wales) Wayne Warren	n/a	n/a	n/a	n/a	Blue Water Dokken, Esbjerg
2019	(Belgium) Brian Raman	n/a	6-3	(Netherlands) Willem Mandigers	n/a	n/a	n/a	n/a	Blue Water Dokken, Esbjerg
2021	(Netherlands) Richard Veenstra	n/a	6-5	(Sweden) Ricky Nauman	n/a	n/a	n/a	n/a	
2022	(England) James Richardson	n/a	6-5	(Netherlands) Jelle Klaasen	n/a	n/a	n/a	n/a	
2023	(Belgium) Andy Baetens	n/a	6-5	(England) Martyn Turner	n/a	DKK 42,400	DKK 12,000	DKK 6,000	
2024	(Sweden) Andreas Harrysson	79.43	6-3	(Scotland) Gary Stone	80.85	DKK 42,400	DKK 12,000	DKK 6,000	

== Tournament records ==
- Most wins 5: (England) John Lowe
- Most Finals 6: (England) John Lowe
- Most Semi Finals 6: (England) John Lowe
- Most Quarter Finals 6: (England) John Lowe, (England) Ronnie Baxter
- Most Appearances 26: (Denmark) Kim F. Jensen
- Youngest Winner age 18: (Poland) Sebastian Białecki
- Oldest Winner age 47: (England) Scott Mitchell
