= Moreno Blom =

Dutch darts player

Personal information
- Full name: Moreno Giovanni Blom
- Nickname: "MB" "Friday Night"
- Born: 24 October 2001 (age 24) Mijdrecht, Netherlands
- Home town: Vinkeveen, Netherlands

Sport
- Sport: Darts
- Playing since: 2015
- Darts: 23g Pentathlon
- Laterality: Left-handed

Organisation (see split in darts)
- PDC: 2020–
- WDF: 2022–
- Current world ranking: (WDF) 10 ▲3 (17 August 2026)

WDF major events – best performances
- World Championship: Last 32: 2023
- World Masters: Last 64: 2024
- Dutch Open: Last 32: 2020

Other tournament wins
- Years
Budapest Classic	2023
Hungarian Classic	2022
Royal Grafenegg Masters	2024
Zlatibor Classic	2023

Moreno Giovanni Blom (born 24 October 2001) is a Dutch professional darts player who competes in World Darts Federation (WDF) and Professional Darts Corporation (PDC) events. He is a Hungarian Classic champion.

== Career ==
Blom was fourteen when he started his darts career. During the first period of his career, he played only in local tournaments. As part of the local team, he played with Jermaine Wattimena. In 2020, he took part in international PDC Development Tour tournaments for the first time. In late September, he threw a nine-dart finish during the second round match against Brian Raman. He competed in the 2020 PDC World Youth Championship. In the group stage, he beat Levy Frauenfelder and Maikel Verberk, and advanced to second round. He defeated Joshua Richardson in the knockout phase match and finally lost to Jeffrey de Zwaan in the third round.

After the season ended, he participated in online tournaments where he was once caught during cheating. In the next season, he took part in the PDC Challenge Tour and PDC Development Tour tournaments several times, but without success. No qualifications for the PDC World Youth Championship made Blom change his career strategy and switch to playing in the World Darts Federation (WDF) tournaments. Already at the beginning of 2022, during the Slovak Masters, he was advanced to the final of the tournament, but lost to Neil Duff 5–2 in legs. He took part in the 2022 Dutch Open in June, but was eliminated in the fourth round despite being seeded.

At the end of October, he won the Hungarian Classic. This is his first international tournament win. He defeated Benjamin Pratnemer in the final by 5–3 in legs. By this achievement, he secured his debut in the 2023 WDF World Darts Championship and qualified for the 2022 World Masters.

== Controversies ==
In December 2020, Blom was caught cheating during an online darts tournament. Footage showed that Blom threw a dart in the board after having a bounce out with the same dart earlier; he also submitted incorrect scores during the match. Blom admitted the allegations afterwards. The tournament organizer decided to have Blom removed from the tournament and disqualified for every next tournament of that platform. This situation did not entail any additional consequences.

== World Championship results ==
=== WDF World Championship ===
- 2023: Second round (lost to Neil Duff 1–3)
- 2024: First round (lost to Paul Lim 0–2)

== Performance timeline ==
=== WDF ===
Tournament	2020	2022	2023	2024
WDF Ranked televised events
World Championship	NH	DNQ	2R	1R
World Masters	NH	RR	NH	3R
Dutch Open	8R	4R	4R	5R

=== PDC ===
Tournament	2020	2023	2024
PDC Non-ranked televised events
World Youth Championship	3R	3R	RR
