= Patrik Kovács =

Patrik Kovács may refer to:

- Patrik Kovács (darts player) (born 1996), Hungarian darts player
- Patrik Kovács (footballer, born 2005), Hungarian football defender for MTK
- Patrik Kovács (footballer, born 2007), Hungarian football forward for Videoton
