= Italian Grand Masters =

Tournament information
- Venue: Grand Hotel Bologna (2009–2022); Play Hall (2024)
- Location: Pieve di Cento (2009–2022); Riccione (2024)
- Country: Italy
- Established: 2009
- Organisation(s): WDF
- Format: Legs
- Prize fund: €8,000

Current champion(s)
- Jimmy van Schie (men's); Lerena Rietbergen (women's)

The Italian Grand Masters is a darts tournament held in Pieve di Cento, Italy, currently sanctioned by the World Darts Federation. It was established in 2009, being the most important darts tournament held in Italy. It was jointly held with the Italian Open the same weekend.

== List of winners ==
=== Men's ===
Year	Champion	Av.	Score	Runner-Up	Av.	Prize Money			Venue
Year	Champion	Av.	Score	Runner-Up	Av.	Total	Ch.	R.-Up	Venue
2009	(France) Cyril Blot	n/a	beat	(Italy) Marco Apollonio	n/a	€1,610	€500	€250	Bologna Grand Hotel, Pieve di Cento
2010	(Italy) Franco Bertini	n/a	5 – 2	(Italy) Luca Catallo	n/a	€2,000	€750	€430	Bologna Grand Hotel, Pieve di Cento
2011	Max Hopp	n/a	6 – 5	(Italy) Luca Catallo	n/a	€2,000	€750	€430	Bologna Grand Hotel, Pieve di Cento
2012	(Italy) Allarce Mer-Cabril	n/a	6 – 2	(England) Trevor Perry	n/a	€2,050	€750	€400	Bologna Grand Hotel, Pieve di Cento
2013	(England) Martin Barratt	n/a	6 – 4	(Italy) Luca Catallo	n/a	€2,050	€750	€400	Bologna Grand Hotel, Pieve di Cento
2014	(Netherlands) Matthew Medhurst	n/a	6 – 3	(Italy) Marco Apollonio	n/a	€2,400	€800	€400	Bologna Grand Hotel, Pieve di Cento
2015	(Malta) Norbert Attard	n/a	6 – 3	(Malta) Godfrey Abela	n/a	€2,400	€800	€400	Bologna Grand Hotel, Pieve di Cento
2016	Wesley Harms	n/a	6 – 1	Martin Adams	n/a	€4,800	€1,600	€800	Bologna Grand Hotel, Pieve di Cento
2017	Wesley Harms (2)	n/a	6 – 1	Michael Unterbuchner	n/a	€8,400	€2,400	€1,200	Bologna Grand Hotel, Pieve di Cento
2018	Wesley Harms (3)	n/a	6 – 4	Mario Vandenbogaerde	n/a	€8,400	€2,400	€1,200	Bologna Grand Hotel, Pieve di Cento
2019	Ross Montgomery	n/a	6 – 3	Wesley Harms	n/a	€8,500	€2,500	€1,200	Bologna Grand Hotel, Pieve di Cento
2021	Richard Veenstra	87.48	5 – 3	James Hurrell	n/a	€5,600	€1,600	€800	Bologna Grand Hotel, Pieve di Cento
2022	James Hurrell	n/a	5 – 3	Nick Kenny	n/a	€5,600	€1,600	€800	Bologna Grand Hotel, Pieve di Cento
2024	Jimmy van Schie	n/a	5 – 1	Kai Fan Leung	n/a	€5,600	€1,600	€800	Play Hall, Riccione

=== Women's ===
Year	Champion	Av.	Score	Runner-Up	Av.	Prize Money			Venue
Year	Champion	Av.	Score	Runner-Up	Av.	Total	Ch.	R.-Up	Venue
2010	(Italy) Laura Ariani	n/a	4 – 2	(Italy) Giada Ciofi	n/a	€1,000	€400	€200	Bologna Grand Hotel, Pieve di Cento
2011	(Italy) Giada Ciofi	n/a	5 – 0	(Italy) Barbara Osti	n/a	€1,000	€400	€200	Bologna Grand Hotel, Pieve di Cento
2012	(Italy) Barbara Osti	n/a	5 – 1	(Italy) Veleda Gaiga	n/a	€1,000	€400	€200	Bologna Grand Hotel, Pieve di Cento
2013	(Italy) Samantha Piccolo	n/a	5 – 2	(Italy) Giovanna Novelli	n/a	€1,000	€400	€200	Bologna Grand Hotel, Pieve di Cento
2014	(England) Annette Lord	n/a	5 – 3	(Italy) Giada Ciofi	n/a	€1,000	€400	€200	Bologna Grand Hotel, Pieve di Cento
2015	(Italy) Giada Ciofi (2)	n/a	5 – 4	(Italy) Talita Biagetti	n/a	€1,000	€400	€200	Bologna Grand Hotel, Pieve di Cento
2016	Aileen de Graaf	n/a	5 – 4	Trina Gulliver	n/a	€2,400	€800	€400	Bologna Grand Hotel, Pieve di Cento
2017	Deta Hedman	n/a	5 – 2	Aileen de Graaf	n/a	€2,400	€800	€400	Bologna Grand Hotel, Pieve di Cento
2018	Aileen de Graaf (2)	n/a	5 – 0	Paula Jacklin	n/a	€2,400	€800	€400	Bologna Grand Hotel, Pieve di Cento
2019	Laura Turner	n/a	5 – 3	Aileen de Graaf	n/a	€3,000	€1,000	€500	Bologna Grand Hotel, Pieve di Cento
2021	Maria O'Brien	65.88	5 – 1	Priscilla Steenbergen	n/a	€2,400	€800	€400	Bologna Grand Hotel, Pieve di Cento
2022	Priscilla Steenbergen	n/a	5 – 4	Paula Jacklin	n/a	€2,400	€800	€400	Bologna Grand Hotel, Pieve di Cento
2024	Lerena Rietbergen	n/a	5 – 1	Irina Armstrong	n/a	€2,400	€800	€400	Play Hall, Riccione
