= Kirsty Hutchinson =

English darts player (born 1991)

Personal information
- Born: 6 April 1991 (age 35) Durham, England

Sport
- Sport: Darts
- Playing since: 2010
- Darts: 22 Gram
- Laterality: Right-handed
- Walk-on music: "Stupidisco" by Junior Jack

Organisation (see split in darts)
- BDO: 2016–2020
- PDC: 2012–
- WDF: 2016–
- Current world ranking: (WDF W) NR (17 August 2026)

WDF major events – best performances
- World Championship: Runner-up: 2022
- World Masters: Last 16: 2022
- World Trophy: Last 16: 2019
- Dutch Open: Semi-final: 2022

Other tournament wins
- Years
Northern Ireland Matchplay	2019
Northern Ireland Open	2019
Swedish Masters	2024
Welsh Open	2021

Kirsty Hutchinson (born 6 April 1991) is an English professional darts player who competes in Professional Darts Corporation (PDC) and World Darts Federation (WDF) events.

== Career ==
In October 2019, Hutchinson qualified for the 2020 BDO World Darts Championship as one of the Playoff Qualifiers, but lost 1–2 to Aileen de Graaf in the first round. Hutchinson participated in the Women's World Championships where she defeated Jo Clements, Priscilla Steenbergen and Rhian O'Sullivan before losing to Beau Greaves in the final by 0–4 (s) while only managing to score one leg by checking out 2 within the final.

== World Championship results ==
=== BDO ===
- 2020: First round (lost to Aileen de Graaf 1–2)

=== WDF ===
- 2022: Runner-up (lost to Beau Greaves 0–4)
- 2023: Quarter-finals (lost to Lisa Ashton 1–2)
- 2024: Second round (lost to Deta Hedman 1–2)
