= Maria O'Brien =

English darts player

Personal information
- Nickname: "OB"
- Born: 14 May 1970 (age 56) Plymouth, England
- Home town: Plymouth, England

Sport
- Sport: Darts
- Playing since: 1991
- Laterality: Left-handed
- Walk-on music: Maria by Blondie

Organisation (see split in darts)
- BDO: 2016–2020
- WDF: 2016–
- Current world ranking: (WDF W) NR (17 August 2026)

WDF major events – best performances
- World Championship: Semi Final: 2019
- World Masters: Semi Final: 2016
- World Trophy: Quarter Final: 2018, 2019

Maria O'Brien (born 14 May 1970) is an English darts player who plays in World Darts Federation (WDF) events.

== Career ==
O'Brien reached the Semi-Final of the World Masters in 2016. In 2017, she reached the Last 16 of the BDO World Trophy and won the Romanian Classic. She qualified for the 2018 BDO World Darts Championship as the 13th seed, facing Sharon Prins in the last 16, where she lost 0–2.

== World Championship results ==
=== BDO/WDF ===
- 2018: First round (lost to Sharon Prins 0–2)
- 2019: Semi-finals (lost to Mikuru Suzuki 0–2)
- 2020: First round (lost to Mikuru Suzuki 1–2)
- 2022: Quarter-finals (lost to Rhian O'Sullivan 0–2)
