= Anca Zijlstra =

Dutch darts player

Personal information
- Nickname: "The Phoenix"
- Born: 3 September 1973 (age 53) Heerlen, Netherlands
- Home town: Brunssum, Netherlands

Sport
- Sport: Darts
- Laterality: Right-handed
- Walk-on music: "Headlong" by Queen

Organisation (see split in darts)
- BDO: 2011–2020
- WDF: 2011–
- Current world ranking: 3 (WDF W) 20 (17 August 2026)

WDF major events – best performances
- World Championship: Quarter Final: 2016
- World Masters: Last 16: 2012
- World Trophy: Semi Final: 2017
- Dutch Open: Runner-up: 2020

Other tournament wins
- Years
Hungarian Open	2012
BDO International Open	2017
Denmark Open	2021
Swiss Open	2022
Medal record
Women's Darts
Representing Netherlands
WDF Europe Cup
Silver medal – second place	2022 Gandía	Men's team
Bronze medal – third place	2022 Gandía	Men's pairs
Bronze medal – third place	2022 Gandía	Men's overall

Anja Carolina Zijlstra (born 3 September 1973) is a Dutch darts player who competes in events of the World Darts Federation (WDF).

== World Championship results ==
=== BDO/WDF ===
- 2016: Quarter-finals (lost to Aileen de Graaf 1–2)
- 2017: First round (lost to Lorraine Winstanley 0–2)
- 2018: First round (lost to Anastasia Dobromyslova 0–2)
- 2022: Second round (lost to Priscilla Steenbergen 0–2)
- 2023: Second round (lost to Paula Murphy 0–2)
- 2024: First round (lost to Jitka Císařová 0–2)
