= Richard Veenstra =

Dutch darts player (born 1981)

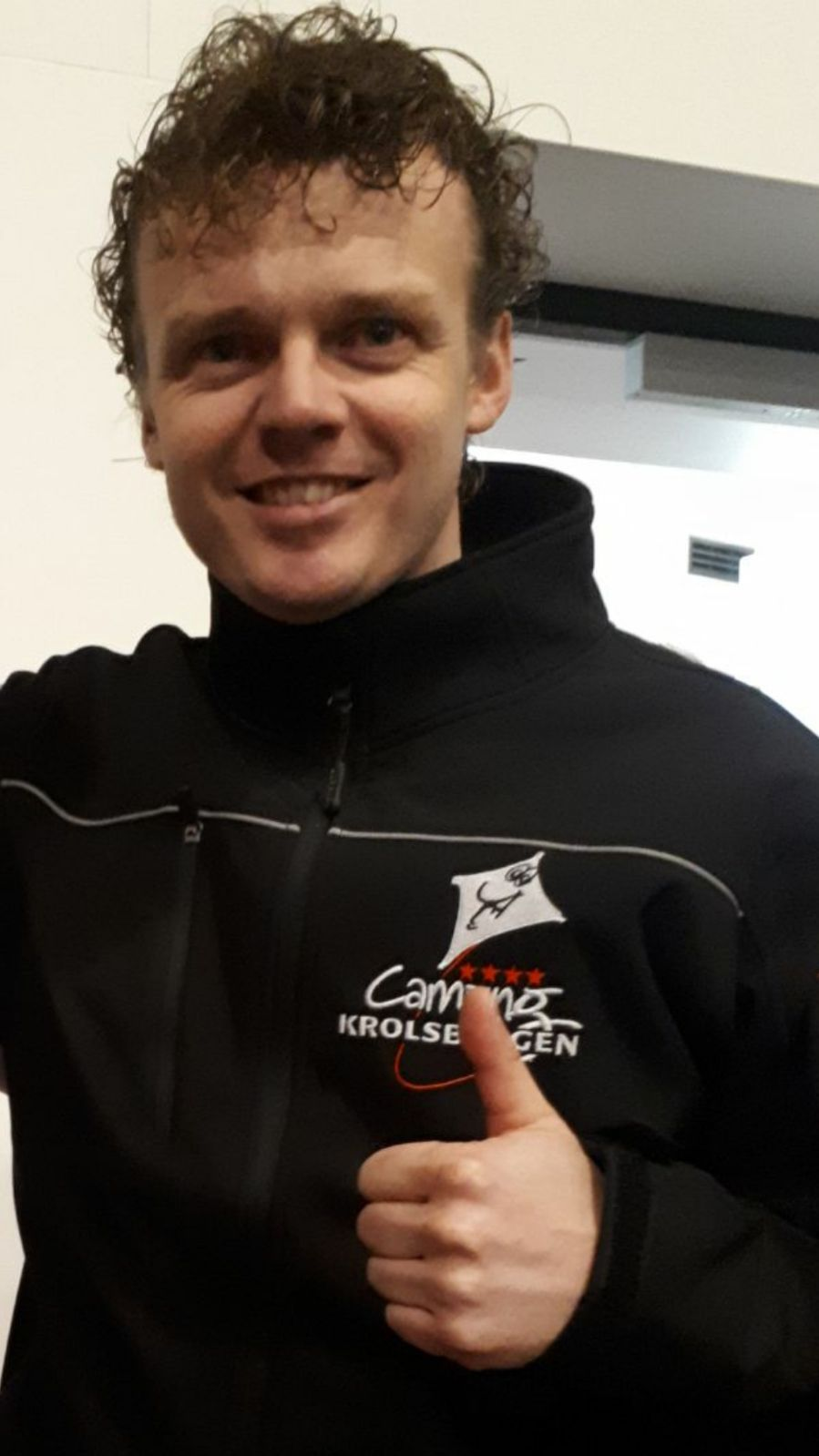
- Veenstra in 2018

Personal information
- Nickname: "Flyers"
- Born: 10 July 1981 (age 45) Ossenzijl, Netherlands

Sport
- Sport: Darts
- Playing since: 2006
- Darts: 23g Bull's NL Signature
- Laterality: Right-handed
- Walk-on music: "Maria (I Like It Loud)" by Scooter

Organisation (see split in darts)
- BDO: 2009–2020
- PDC: 2023–present (Tour Card: 2023–present)
- WDF: 2009–2022
- Current world ranking: (PDC) 58 (5 November 2026)

WDF major events – best performances
- World Championship: Semi-final: 2016, 2022
- World Masters: Last 16: 2015, 2018
- World Trophy: Runner-up: 2019
- Finder Masters: Runner-up: 2018
- Dutch Open: Winner (1): 2019

PDC premier events – best performances
- World Championship: Last 32: 2024
- UK Open: Last 64: 2024
- Grand Slam: Group Stage: 2019
- PC Finals: Last 32: 2023, 2025

Other tournament wins
- Years
BDO/WDF Events (x10)
British Classic	2018
British Open	2018
Denmark Masters	2021
German Masters	2017
Isle of Man Classic	2019
Italian Grand Masters	2021
Luxembourg Masters	2019
Luxembourg Open	2014
Scottish Open	2018
Medal record
Men's Darts
Representing Netherlands
WDF World Cup
Gold medal – first place	2015	Men's pairs
WDF Europe Cup
Gold medal – first place	2016	Men's singles
Gold medal – first place	2016	Men's pairs
Gold medal – first place	2016	Men's overall
Silver medal – second place	2016	Men's team
Silver medal – second place	2018	Men's team

Richard Veenstra (born 10 July 1981) is a Dutch professional darts player who competes in Professional Darts Corporation (PDC) events. Veenstra previously participated in British Darts Organisation (BDO) and World Darts Federation (WDF) tournaments. He won 12 BDO/WDF singles titles, including in the 2019 Dutch Open and 2016 WDF Europe Cup. He was the runner-up at the 2019 BDO World Trophy and 2018 Finder Darts Masters.

Veenstra obtained a PDC Tour Card in 2023, and reached the last 32 in his PDC World Championship debut in 2024. He has reached five quarter-finals in Players Championship events.

He was also a two-time world championship semi-finalist at Lakeside, reaching the last four at the 2016 BDO World Championship and the 2022 WDF World Championship.

== Career ==
=== BDO/WDF ===
In October 2014, Veenstra won the Luxembourg Open beating Mark Oosterhuis in the Final 6–4. He reached the semi-finals of the 2015 Denmark Masters and England Open. In October 2015, he won WDF World Cup Pairs with Wesley Harms to beat Scott Mitchell and Mark McGeeney 6–3. On his debut at the 2016 BDO World Darts Championship, Veenstra caused an upset beating compatriot and third seed Jeffrey de Graaf 3–2 in the first round, before beating English player Martin Atkins comfortably 4–0 in the second round. Veenstra then defeated defending champion Scott Mitchell 5–3 to reach the semi-finals, which he narrowly lost to Jeff Smith 6–5.

In September 2016, Veenstra won the WDF Europe Cup singles by beating Jim Williams in the final 7–5, averaging 93.18. In September 2018, he won both the BDO British Open and BDO British Classic in the same weekend.

At the 2022 WDF World Darts Championship, Veenstra recorded the highest three dart average in the venue's history with 104.91, to defeat Luke Littler 3–0 in the last 16. In the quarter-final he almost achieved a nine-dart finish en route to a 4–2 victory against Brian Raman, but missed double 12. Veenstra was defeated in his semi-final match against Neil Duff, losing 5–2.

=== PDC ===
At 2023 European Q-School, Veenstra secured a PDC tour card for the 2023 and 2024 seasons by finishing second on the European Q-School Order of Merit.

Veenstra enjoyed a run to the third round at the 2024 PDC World Darts Championship in his tournament debut year. Having defeated Ben Robb and the seeded Kim Huybrechts, he fell to a 0–4 whitewash defeat to Dutch compatriot Michael van Gerwen.

== World Championship results ==
=== BDO ===
- 2016: Semi-finals (lost to Jeff Smith 5–6)
- 2017: Second round (lost to Danny Noppert 0–4)
- 2018: Quarter-finals (lost to Michael Unterbuchner 4–5)
- 2019: Second round (lost to Scott Waites 1–4)
- 2020: Second round (lost to David Evans 2–4)

=== WDF ===
- 2022: Semi-finals (lost to Neil Duff 2–5)

=== PDC ===
- 2024: Third round (lost to Michael van Gerwen 0–4)
- 2025: First round (lost to Alexis Toylo 0–3)
- 2026: First round (lost to Nitin Kumar 2–3)

== Career finals ==
=== BDO major finals: 2 ===
Legend
Zuiderduin Masters (0–1)
BDO World Trophy (0–1)

Outcome	No.	Year	Championship	Opponent in the final	Score (Note: (l) = score in legs, (s) = score in sets.)
Runner-up	1.	2018	Zuiderduin Masters	(England) Glen Durrant	3–5 (s)
Runner-up	2.	2019	BDO World Trophy	(Wales) Jim Williams	6–8 (l)

== Performance timeline ==
=== BDO ===
Tournament	2014	2015	2016	2017	2018	2019	2020
BDO Ranked televised events
World Championship	DNQ		SF	2R	QF	2R	2R
World Trophy	DNQ		1R	1R	DNP	F	NH
World Masters	L80	L16	L32	L32	L16	L32	NH
Zuiderduin Masters	RR	RR	RR	RR	F	NH	

=== WDF ===
Tournament	2022
WDF Ranked televised events
World Championship	SF
World Masters	L32

=== PDC ===
Tournament	2019	2023	2024	2025	2026
PDC Ranked televised events
World Championship	BDO	DNQ	3R	1R	1R
World Masters	Did not qualify			Prel.	Prel.
UK Open	DNQ	3R	4R	3R	4R
Grand Slam	RR	Did not qualify			
Players Championship Finals	DNQ	2R	1R	2R	
Career statistics
Season-end ranking (PDC)	NR	71	47	57	

=== PDC European Tour ===
Season	1	2	3	4	5	6	7	8	9	10	11	12	13	14	15
2021	HDT; 2R	GDT; DNQ													
2023	BSD; 2R	Did not qualify					BDO; 1R	CDO; 1R	Did not qualify			HDT; 1R	GDC; DNQ		
2024	BDO; 2R	GDG; 2R	IDO; 3R	EDG; DNQ	ADO; 2R	Did not qualify				FDT; 1R	HDT; DNQ	SDT; 2R	CDO; DNQ		
2025	BDO; DNQ	EDT; DNQ	IDO; 2R	Did not qualify				EDO; 1R	BSD; 1R	FDT; DNQ	CDO; 1R	HDT; 2R	SDT; 2R	GDC; DNQ	
2026	PDO; DNQ	EDT; QF	Did not qualify					BSD; 1R	Did not qualify						DDC; 1R

=== PDC Players Championships ===
Season	1	2	3	4	5	6	7	8	9	10	11	12	13	14	15	16	17	18	19	20	21	22	23	24	25	26	27	28	29	30	31	32	33	34
2021 (Note: Not a Tour card holder)	DNP																											BAR; 1R	BAR; 1R	BAR; 1R				
2023	BAR; 3R	BAR; QF	BAR; 4R	BAR; 2R	BAR; 2R	BAR; 4R	HIL; 2R	HIL; 2R	WIG; 2R	WIG; 2R	LEI; 1R	LEI; 3R	HIL; 1R	HIL; 4R	LEI; 1R	LEI; 1R	HIL; 2R	HIL; QF	BAR; 2R	BAR; 2R	BAR; 3R	BAR; 3R	BAR; 3R	BAR; 1R	BAR; 1R	BAR; 1R	BAR; 1R	BAR; 1R	BAR; 3R	BAR; 4R				
2024	WIG; 2R	WIG; 1R	LEI; 2R	LEI; 3R	HIL; 2R	HIL; 3R	LEI; 1R	LEI; 1R	HIL; 4R	HIL; 3R	HIL; 1R	HIL; QF	MIL; 1R	MIL; 1R	MIL; 1R	MIL; 1R	MIL; 2R	MIL; 2R	MIL; 1R	WIG; 4R	WIG; 1R	MIL; 3R	MIL; 2R	WIG; 3R	WIG; 1R	WIG; 1R	WIG; 2R	WIG; 3R	LEI; 3R	LEI; 2R				
2025	WIG; QF	WIG; 1R	ROS; 2R	ROS; 1R	LEI; 1R	LEI; 1R	HIL; 3R	HIL; 2R	LEI; 1R	LEI; 1R	LEI; 2R	LEI; 1R	ROS; 1R	ROS; 2R	HIL; 1R	HIL; 1R	LEI; QF	LEI; 1R	LEI; 1R	LEI; 1R	LEI; 1R	HIL; 1R	HIL; 1R	MIL; 1R	MIL; 2R	HIL; 2R	HIL; QF	LEI; 4R	LEI; 1R	LEI; 1R	WIG; 4R	WIG; 2R	WIG; 4R	WIG; 1R
2026	HIL; 1R	HIL; 1R	WIG; 2R	WIG; 1R	LEI; 3R	LEI; 3R	LEI; 1R	LEI; 4R	WIG; QF	WIG; 2R	MIL; 1R	MIL; 2R	HIL; 2R	HIL; QF	LEI; 3R	LEI; 1R	LEI; 1R	LEI; 1R	MIL; 3R	MIL; SF	WIG; 3R	WIG; 3R	LEI; DNP	LEI; 2R	HIL; 3R	HIL; 4R	LEI; 2R	LEI; 3R	ROS; 2R	ROS; 3R	ROS; 2R	ROS; 3R	LEI; 1R	LEI; 2R

Performance Table Legend
W	Won the tournament	F	Finalist	SF	Semifinalist	QF	Quarterfinalist	#R; RR; Prel.	Lost in # round Round-robin; Preliminary round	DQ	Disqualified
DNQ	Did not qualify	DNP	Did not participate	WD	Withdrew	NH	Tournament not held	#R; RR; Prel.	Lost in # round Round-robin; Preliminary round	NYF	Not yet founded
