= 2024 UK Open =

2024 Ladbrokes UK Open

Tournament information
- Dates: 1–3 March 2024
- Venue: Butlin's Minehead
- Location: Minehead, England
- Organisation(s): Professional Darts Corporation (PDC)
- Format: Legs; Final – best of 21
- Prize fund: £600,000
- Winner's share: £110,000
- High checkout: 170; Daniel Klose; Andy Baetens; Kevin Doets; Luke Littler

Champion(s)
- Dimitri Van den Bergh (BEL)

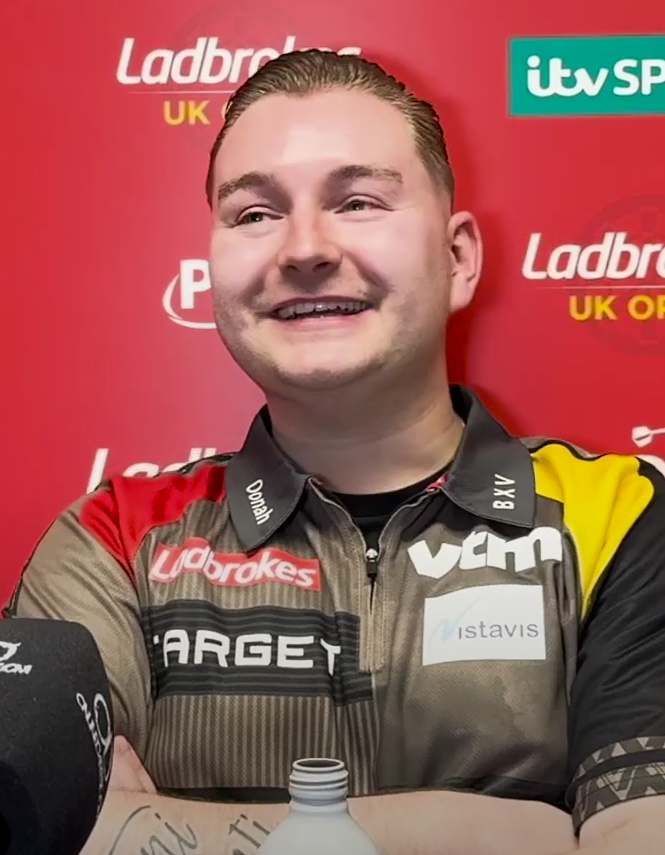
Dimitri Van den Bergh won the UK Open for the first time in his career.

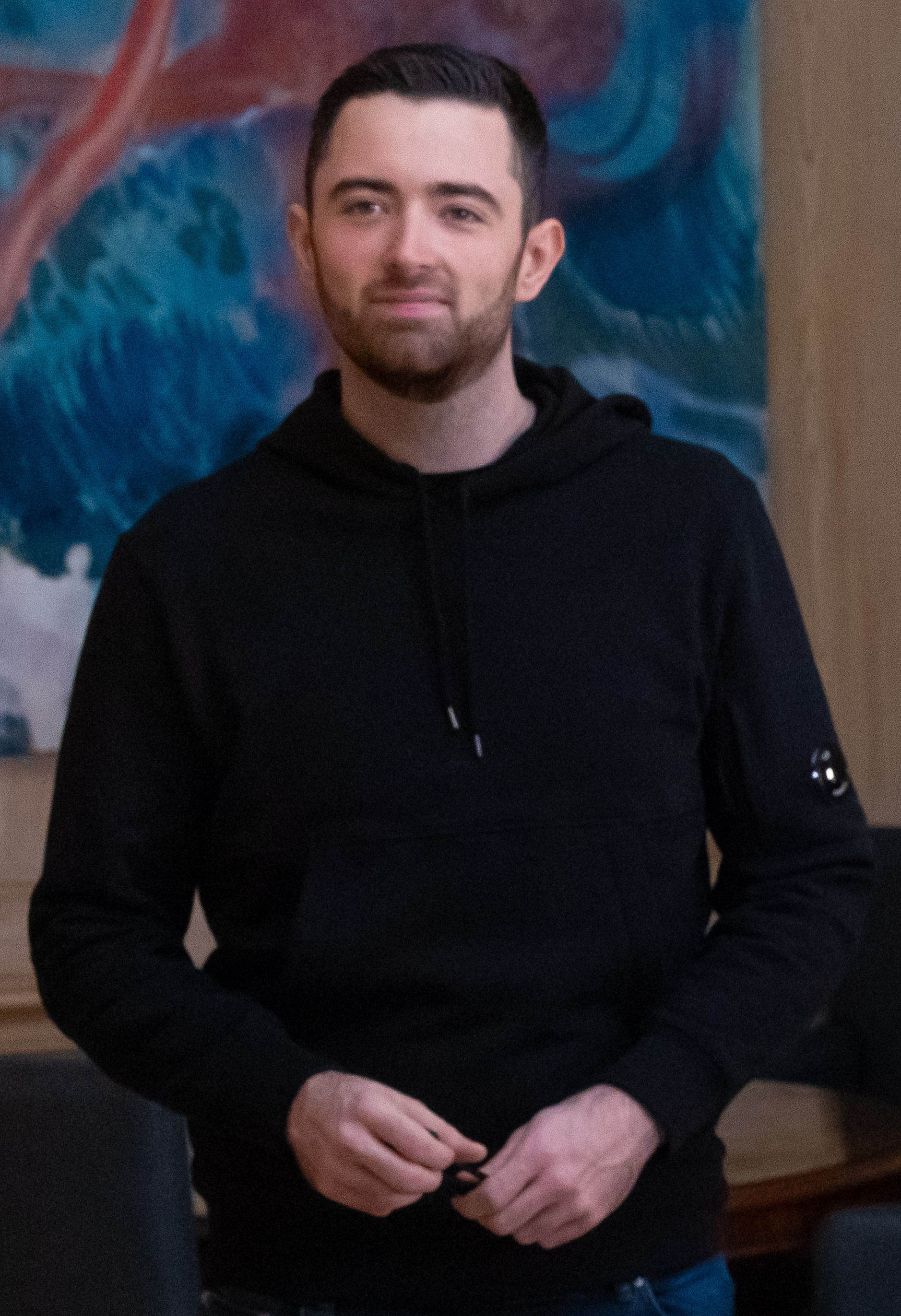
Luke Humphries was defeated in the final for the second time.

The 2024 UK Open (known for sponsorship reasons as the 2024 Ladbrokes UK Open) was a professional darts tournament that was held from 1 to 3 March 2024 Butlin's in Minehead, England. It was the twenty-second UK Open to be staged by the Professional Darts Corporation. The tournament featured 158 participants which comprised PDC Tour Card holders, PDC Challenge/Development Tour players and amateur qualifiers.

Andrew Gilding was the defending champion after defeating Michael van Gerwen 11–10 in the 2023 final to win his first major title, but he lost 10–1 to Peter Wright in the fifth round.

Dimitri Van den Bergh beat Luke Humphries 11–10 to win the UK Open for the first time in his career.

== Prize money ==
The prize fund was unchanged at £600,000.

| Stage (no. of players) | | Prize money (Total: £600,000) |
|---|---|---|
| Winner | (1) | £110,000 |
| Runner-up | (1) | £50,000 |
| Semi-finalists | (2) | £30,000 |
| Quarter-finalists | (4) | £15,000 |
| Last 16 (sixth round) | (8) | £10,000 |
| Last 32 (fifth round) | (16) | £5,000 |
| Last 64 (fourth round) | (32) | £2,500 |
| Last 96 (third round) | (32) | £1,500 |
| Last 128 (second round) | (32) | £1,000 |
| Last 160 (first round) | (32) | n/a |

== Format ==
The 158 participants entered the competition incrementally, with 62 players entering in the first round. Match winners joined the 32 players entering in the second and third rounds to leave the last 64 in the fourth round.

- No players were seeded.
- A random draw was held for each of the following rounds following the conclusion of the third round.
- All matches in the first, second and third rounds were played over best of 11 legs.
- All matches in the fourth, fifth and sixth rounds and quarter-finals were played over best of 19 legs.
- All matches in the semi-finals and final were played over best of 21 legs.
- Eight boards were used for matches in the first, second, third and fourth rounds.
- Four boards were used for matches in the fifth round.
- Two boards were used for matches in the sixth round.
- One board was used for all the matches in the quarter-finals, semi-finals and final.

== Qualifiers ==
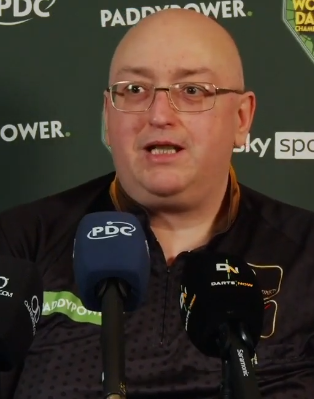
Andrew Gilding was the defending champion going into the tournament.

The 128 Tour Card holders will have a staggered entry based on their Order of Merit ranking on 27 February 2024. They will be joined by the top 8 non-qualified players from each of the 2023 Challenge & Development Tour Orders of Merit, and by the winners of 16 Amateur Qualification events organised through Riley's Sports Bars.

Adrian Lewis and Adam Hunt, who were due to enter the third and first rounds respectively, did not enter the competition. All players below Lewis moved up one space, and two byes were offered in the first round.

=== Number 1–32 on the PDC Order of Merit (receiving byes into fourth round) ===
1. Luke Humphries (runner-up)
2. Michael van Gerwen (fourth round)
3. Michael Smith (fifth round)
4. Nathan Aspinall (fifth round)
5. Gerwyn Price (fourth round)
6. Rob Cross (quarter-finals)
7. Danny Noppert (fifth round)
8. Peter Wright (sixth round)
9. Jonny Clayton (sixth round)
10. Dave Chisnall (sixth round)
11. Damon Heta (semi-finals)
12. Dirk van Duijvenbode (fourth round)
13. Joe Cullen (fourth round)
14. Dimitri Van den Bergh (champion)
15. Chris Dobey (fifth round)
16. Ross Smith (fifth round)
17. Stephen Bunting (quarter-finals)
18. Ryan Searle (fourth round)
19. Andrew Gilding (fifth round)
20. James Wade (fourth round)
21. Josh Rock (fifth round)
22. Gabriel Clemens (fourth round)
23. Martin Schindler (fifth round)
24. Krzysztof Ratajski (fifth round)
25. Gary Anderson (sixth round)
26. José de Sousa (fourth round)
27. Brendan Dolan (fourth round)
28. Daryl Gurney (fourth round)
29. Raymond van Barneveld (fourth round)
30. Luke Littler (quarter-finals)
31. Scott Williams (fourth round)
32. Kim Huybrechts (fourth round)

=== Number 33–64 on the PDC Order of Merit (receiving byes into third round) ===
33. Callan Rydz (third round)
34. Madars Razma (third round)
35. Martin Lukeman (quarter-finals)
36. Ricardo Pietreczko (fourth round)
37. Ryan Joyce (third round)
38. Luke Woodhouse (sixth round)
39. Mike De Decker (fifth round)
40. Jim Williams (third round)
41. Gian van Veen (sixth round)
42. William O'Connor (third round)
43. Keane Barry (sixth round)
44. Alan Soutar (third round)
45. Simon Whitlock (fourth round)
46. Ricky Evans (semi-finals)
47. Jermaine Wattimena (third round)
48. Rowby-John Rodriguez (fourth round)
49. Matt Campbell (third round)
50. Steve Beaton (third round)
51. ~~Adrian Lewis~~ (Note: Withdrew prior to tournament draw)
52. Mickey Mansell (fourth round)
53. Boris Krčmar (fourth round)
54. Cameron Menzies (fourth round)
55. Vincent van der Voort (fifth round)
56. Mensur Suljović (fifth round)
57. Jamie Hughes (third round)
58. Ritchie Edhouse (third round)
59. Florian Hempel (fourth round)
60. Adam Gawlas (fourth round)
61. Ryan Meikle (fifth round)
62. Kevin Doets (fifth round)
63. Ian White (third round)
64. Mervyn King (sixth round)
65. Richard Veenstra (fourth round)

=== Number 65–96 on the PDC Order of Merit (receiving byes into second round) ===
66. Niels Zonneveld (second round)
67. Lee Evans (third round)
68. Dylan Slevin (third round)
69. Keegan Brown (second round)
70. Maik Kuivenhoven (third round)
71. Stephen Burton (second round)
72. Jeffrey de Zwaan (third round)
73. Daniel Klose (fourth round)
74. Karel Sedláček (second round)
75. Arron Monk (second round)
76. Robert Owen (third round)
77. Jeffrey Sparidaans (second round)
78. Pascal Rupprecht (second round)
79. Jurjen van der Velde (second round)
80. Nick Kenny (fourth round)
81. Adam Smith-Neale (second round)
82. Graham Hall (second round)
83. Graham Usher (fifth round)
84. Josh Payne (fourth round)
85. Ronny Huybrechts (third round)
86. Geert Nentjes (third round)
87. Owen Roelofs (third round)
88. Danny van Trijp (second round)
89. Adam Warner (second round)
90. Robbie Knops (second round)
91. Christian Perez (third round)
92. Callum Goffin (second round)
93. Steve Lennon (second round)
94. Berry van Peer (second round)
95. James Hurrell (second round)
96. Mario Vandenbogaerde (third round)
97. Andy Baetens (second round)

=== Number 97–128 on the PDC Order of Merit (starting in first round) ===
98. Leighton Bennett (first round)
99. Jacques Labre (third round)
100. Paul Krohne (first round)
101. Wessel Nijman (third round)
102. Matthew Dennant (third round)
103. Michele Turetta (first round)
104. Rhys Griffin (second round)
105. Nathan Rafferty (first round)
106. Thibault Tricole (third round)
107. ~~Adam Hunt~~
108. Chris Landman (second round)
109. Lukas Wenig (first round)
110. Brett Claydon (fourth round)
111. William Borland (first round)
112. Patrick Geeraets (fourth round)
113. Haupai Puha (second round)
114. Darren Beveridge (second round)
115. Danny Lauby (fourth round)
116. Radek Szagański (first round)
117. Dom Taylor (second round)
118. Jitse van der Wal (first round)
119. Owen Bates (second round)
120. George Killington (third round)
121. Joshua Richardson (fourth round)
122. Benjamin Drue Reus (fifth round)
123. Jules van Dongen (first round)
124. Jeffrey de Graaf (first round)
125. Jelle Klaasen (first round)
126. Martijn Dragt (first round)
127. Robert Grundy (second round)
128. Tim Wolters (fourth round)

=== PDC Development Tour qualifiers (starting in first round) ===
The top 8 ranked players from the 2023 Development Tour Order of Merit who didn't have a Tour Card for the 2024 season qualified for the first round.

1. Sebastian Białecki (first round)
2. Rusty-Jake Rodriguez (first round)
3. Bradley Brooks (second round)
4. Cam Crabtree (first round)
5. Jarred Cole (third round)
6. Bradly Roes (first round)
7. Christopher Toonders (first round)
8. Dominik Grüllich (first round)

=== PDC Challenge Tour qualifiers (starting in first round) ===
The top 8 ranked players from the 2023 Challenge Tour Order of Merit who didn't have a Tour Card for the 2024 season qualified for the first round.

1. John Henderson (third round)
2. Andy Boulton (first round)
3. Christian Kist (first round)
4. Wesley Plaisier (third round)
5. Darryl Pilgrim (first round)
6. Scott Mitchell (fourth round)
7. Conan Whitehead (first round)
8. Ron Meulenkamp (second round)

=== Amateur qualifiers (starting in first round) ===
The winners of qualifiers organised by Rileys Sports Bars, held through January and February 2024, qualified for the first round. Entry to these tournaments was open to all players who had not qualified via another method, regardless of PDC Membership status.

- Kevin Burness (Liverpool) (first round)
- Ashley Coleman (Norwich) (first round)
- Joe Croft (South Benfleet) (third round)
- Leonard Gates (Victoria) (fourth round)
- Harry Gregory (Liverpool) (first round)
- Johnny Haines (Coventry) (second round)
- Jason Hogg (Aberdeen) (first round)
- Harry Lane (Victoria) (second round)
- Tom Lonsdale (Coventry) (second round)
- Thomas Lovely (Chorlton-cum-Hardy) (first round)
- Jack Male (Liverpool) (second round)
- Connor Scutt (Harlow) (first round)
- David Sumner (Chester) (first round)
- Michael Taylor (Chorlton-cum-Hardy) (third round)
- Jenson Walker (Solihull) (second round)
- Brandon Western (Norwich) (first round)

== Draw ==
=== Friday 1 March ===
==== First round (best of eleven legs) ====
| Player | Score | Player | Player | Score | Player |
|---|---|---|---|---|---|
| Jacques Labre | bye | | Christian Kist (CT) 86.73 | 3 – 6 | Patrick Geeraets 87.22 |
| Matthew Dennant 98.63 | 6 – 4 | Jeffrey de Graaf 95.18 | Conan Whitehead (CT) 93.64 | 4 – 6 | Leonard Gates (Q) 93.42 |
| Dom Taylor 82.11 | 6 – 5 | Brandon Western (Q) 81.33 | Lukas Wenig 83.46 | 4 – 6 | Tom Lonsdale (Q) 93.85 |
| Jarred Cole (DT) | bye | | Leighton Bennett 97.38 | 4 – 6 | Scott Mitchell (CT) 95.57 |
| Danny Lauby 86.28 | 6 – 3 | Nathan Rafferty 82.87 | Kevin Burness (Q) 93.78 | 4 – 6 | John Henderson (CT) 87.49 |
| Owen Bates 92.28 | 6 – 5 | Andy Boulton (CT) 88.02 | Connor Scutt (Q) 84.42 | 5 – 6 | Wesley Plaisier (CT) 85.86 |
| Jules van Dongen 90.44 | 5 – 6 | Thibault Tricole 90.14 | Jack Male (Q) 80.97 | 6 – 5 | Martijn Dragt 79.50 |
| Ashley Coleman (Q) 84.56 | 3 – 6 | Tim Wolters 91.74 | Brett Claydon 90.31 | 6 – 4 | Thomas Lovely (Q) 90.77 |
| Bradly Roes (DT) 81.12 | 4 – 6 | Benjamin Drue Reus 85.54 | Haupai Puha 89.50 | 6 – 4 | Jelle Klaasen 90.12 |
| Jitse van der Wal 94.56 | 3 – 6 | Johnny Haines (Q) 95.62 | Sebastian Białecki (DT) 89.71 | 4 – 6 | Jenson Walker (Q) 88.46 |
| Bradley Brooks (DT) 90.04 | 6 – 3 | Cam Crabtree (DT) 88.36 | Paul Krohne 77.05 | 5 – 6 | Michael Taylor (Q) 75.18 |
| Christopher Toonders (DT) 80.68 | 3 – 6 | Chris Landman 86.14 | George Killington 80.89 | 6 – 4 | Radek Szagański 76.92 |
| Rusty-Jake Rodriguez (DT) 86.91 | 1 – 6 | Ron Meulenkamp (CT) 96.19 | Harry Gregory (Q) 86.02 | 5 – 6 | Rhys Griffin 94.31 |
| Joe Croft (Q) 84.67 | 6 – 5 | William Borland 81.38 | Jason Hogg (Q) 89.78 | 4 – 6 | Darren Beveridge 87.64 |
| Harry Lane (Q) 92.89 | 6 – 3 | Dominik Grüllich (DT) 83.06 | Darryl Pilgrim (CT) 94.68 | 5 – 6 | Joshua Richardson 93.34 |
| Michele Turetta 84.99 | 3 – 6 | Robert Grundy 87.31 | David Sumner (Q) 81.54 | 3 – 6 | Wessel Nijman 93.55 |

==== Second round (best of eleven legs) ====
| Player | Score | Player | Player | Score | Player |
|---|---|---|---|---|---|
| Niels Zonneveld 101.10 | 4 – 6 | Wessel Nijman 103.84 | Arron Monk 84.71 | 4 – 6 | Dylan Slevin 94.46 |
| Ronny Huybrechts 82.36 | 6 – 2 | Harry Lane (Q) 77.51 | Chris Landman 89.67 | 0 – 6 | Lee Evans 92.02 |
| James Hurrell 86.07 | 2 – 6 | Joe Croft (Q) 86.76 | Geert Nentjes 93.52 | 6 – 3 | Pascal Rupprecht 87.86 |
| Joshua Richardson 86.45 | 6 – 2 | Keegan Brown 78.11 | Berry van Peer 93.42 | 2 – 6 | Maik Kuivenhoven 99.28 |
| Darren Beveridge 88.75 | 4 – 6 | Scott Mitchell (CT) 94.52 | Jurjen van der Velde 87.37 | 4 – 6 | Jeffrey de Zwaan 92.94 |
| Rhys Griffin 82.94 | 3 – 6 | Leonard Gates (Q) 94.74 | Karel Sedláček 89.69 | 3 – 6 | Robert Owen 97.29 |
| George Killington 89.22 | 6 – 5 | Robbie Knops 85.45 | Wesley Plaisier (CT) 93.29 | 6 – 2 | Haupai Puha 79.81 |
| Jacques Labre 82.52 | 6 – 4 | Steve Lennon 84.78 | Owen Bates 88.09 | 5 – 6 | Graham Usher 89.46 |
| Robert Grundy 82.85 | 5 – 6 | Jarred Cole (DT) 82.18 | Michael Taylor (Q) 81.13 | 6 – 2 | Graham Hall 78.77 |
| Jeffrey Sparidaans 76.09 | 2 – 6 | Christian Perez 91.88 | Jenson Walker (Q) 80.94 | 3 – 6 | Tim Wolters 87.55 |
| Daniel Klose 93.02 | 6 – 3 | Adam Warner 93.30 | Matthew Dennant 85.44 | 6 – 1 | Danny van Trijp 76.89 |
| Bradley Brooks (DT) 80.13 | 5 – 6 | Thibault Tricole 90.67 | Dom Taylor 82.42 | 5 – 6 | John Henderson (CT) 83.63 |
| Adam Smith-Neale 88.49 | 4 – 6 | Patrick Geeraets 86.08 | Jack Male (Q) 79.10 | 5 – 6 | Danny Lauby 76.20 |
| Tom Lonsdale (Q) 81.28 | 3 – 6 | Benjamin Drue Reus 85.47 | Callum Goffin 79.14 | 2 – 6 | Nick Kenny 84.66 |
| Andy Baetens 100.37 | 4 – 6 | Brett Claydon 96.10 | Owen Roelofs 80.37 | 6 – 1 | Stephen Burton 79.93 |
| Johnny Haines (Q) 82.43 | 3 – 6 | Mario Vandenbogaerde 84.38 | Josh Payne 93.40 | 6 – 5 | Ron Meulenkamp (CT) 91.59 |

==== Third round (best of eleven legs) ====
| Player | Score | Player | Player | Score | Player |
|---|---|---|---|---|---|
| Mike De Decker 91.58 | 6 – 3 | Wessel Nijman 88.16 | Nick Kenny 93.84 | 6 – 5 | Matt Campbell 90.00 |
| Benjamin Drue Reus 94.00 | 6 – 5 | Callan Rydz 93.37 | Maik Kuivenhoven 89.59 | 5 – 6 | Simon Whitlock 90.31 |
| Steve Beaton 85.58 | 5 – 6 | Josh Payne 87.77 | Martin Lukeman 102.34 | 6 – 5 | Jermaine Wattimena 97.59 |
| Gian van Veen 94.83 | 6 – 3 | John Henderson (CT) 87.80 | Alan Soutar 90.04 | 4 – 6 | Brett Claydon 87.09 |
| Mervyn King 91.36 | 6 – 4 | George Killington 89.82 | William O'Connor 88.29 | 0 – 6 | Mensur Suljović 90.18 |
| Graham Usher 87.87 | 6 – 3 | Ronny Huybrechts 86.20 | Robert Owen 92.54 | 5 – 6 | Kevin Doets 90.05 |
| Thibault Tricole 86.70 | 3 – 6 | Cameron Menzies 102.91 | Joshua Richardson 91.20 | 6 – 5 | Jamie Hughes 94.88 |
| Keane Barry 92.54 | 6 – 4 | Joe Croft (Q) 92.23 | Tim Wolters 86.87 | 6 – 4 | Ryan Joyce 90.53 |
| Ryan Meikle 87.62 | 6 – 3 | Geert Nentjes 81.06 | Matthew Dennant 86.31 | 5 – 6 | Scott Mitchell (CT) 88.63 |
| Jim Williams 84.89 | 2 – 6 | Leonard Gates (Q) 92.35 | Adam Gawlas 96.97 | 6 – 0 | Jarred Cole (DT) 85.60 |
| Owen Roelofs 85.37 | 1 – 6 | Richard Veenstra 90.82 | Ricky Evans 90.77 | 6 – 3 | Lee Evans 88.57 |
| Danny Lauby 89.39 | 6 – 2 | Jacques Labre 80.70 | Ricardo Pietreczko 83.98 | 6 – 3 | Michael Taylor (Q) 83.18 |
| Boris Krčmar 95.94 | 6 – 1 | Ritchie Edhouse 87.06 | Wesley Plaisier (CT) 81.94 | 3 – 6 | Daniel Klose 84.88 |
| Luke Woodhouse 93.32 | 6 – 4 | Dylan Slevin 94.34 | Jeffrey de Zwaan 89.97 | 1 – 6 | Patrick Geeraets 101.21 |
| Mario Vandenbogaerde 92.56 | 2 – 6 | Florian Hempel 96.71 | Mickey Mansell 94.42 | 6 – 4 | Ian White 88.67 |
| Vincent van der Voort 91.28 | 6 – 4 | Christian Perez 90.12 | Rowby-John Rodriguez 88.16 | 6 – 4 | Madars Razma 87.84 |

==== Fourth round (best of nineteen legs) ====
The draw was made after the results of the third round.

| Player | Score | Player | Player | Score | Player |
|---|---|---|---|---|---|
| Ryan Searle 92.14 | 9 – 10 | Graham Usher 91.62 | Josh Payne 86.99 | 7 – 10 | Andrew Gilding 94.21 |
| Kevin Doets 94.89 | 10 – 6 | Daniel Klose 88.19 | Michael van Gerwen 92.37 | 7 – 10 | Mensur Suljović 90.98 |
| Ross Smith 98.98 | 10 – 8 | Daryl Gurney 90.93 | Scott Mitchell (CT) 93.00 | 6 – 10 | Nathan Aspinall 96.64 |
| Ryan Meikle 85.08 | 10 – 6 | Brett Claydon 85.59 | Benjamin Drue Reus 88.84 | 10 – 7 | José de Sousa 85.25 |
| Chris Dobey 99.39 | 10 – 3 | Mickey Mansell 93.52 | Danny Noppert 99.83 | 10 – 8 | Gabriel Clemens 97.83 |
| Danny Lauby 86.18 | 3 – 10 | Stephen Bunting 92.84 | Scott Williams 96.53 | 4 – 10 | Ricky Evans 96.53 |
| Kim Huybrechts 85.08 | 6 – 10 | Keane Barry 92.58 | Michael Smith 93.59 | 10 – 7 | Joe Cullen 97.53 |
| Rowby-John Rodriguez 83.38 | 3 – 10 | Rob Cross 96.68 | Simon Whitlock 84.92 | 8 – 10 | Damon Heta 95.60 |
| Cameron Menzies 90.84 | 5 – 10 | Gary Anderson 96.35 | Raymond van Barneveld 93.49 | 9 – 10 | Luke Woodhouse 94.62 |
| Gerwyn Price 99.54 | 9 – 10 | Martin Schindler 98.93 | Jonny Clayton 83.57 | 10 – 9 | Tim Wolters 85.86 |
| James Wade 95.90 | 7 – 10 | Luke Littler 101.81 | Leonard Gates (Q) 83.39 | 5 – 10 | Martin Lukeman 92.35 |
| Brendan Dolan 94.66 | 8 – 10 | Dimitri Van den Bergh 99.80 | Gian van Veen 90.97 | 10 – 7 | Florian Hempel 90.56 |
| Mike De Decker 96.12 | 10 – 6 | Richard Veenstra 90.86 | Dirk van Duijvenbode 95.69 | 7 – 10 | Luke Humphries 101.16 |
| Nick Kenny 89.39 | 4 – 10 | Dave Chisnall 92.14 | Krzysztof Ratajski 94.19 | 10 – 4 | Adam Gawlas 92.19 |
| Joshua Richardson 94.32 | 3 – 10 | Peter Wright 94.28 | Josh Rock 98.30 | 10 – 5 | Patrick Geeraets 88.18 |
| Mervyn King 95.63 | 10 – 3 | Ricardo Pietreczko 98.34 | Vincent van der Voort 84.82 | 10 – 5 | Boris Krčmar 82.55 |

=== Saturday 2 March ===
==== Fifth round (best of nineteen legs) ====
| Player | Score | Player | Player | Score | Player |
|---|---|---|---|---|---|
| Ricky Evans 97.23 | 10 – 5 | Mike De Decker 94.17 | Peter Wright 101.56 | 10 – 1 | Andrew Gilding 89.75 |
| Luke Littler 101.86 | 10 – 8 | Martin Schindler 98.25 | Stephen Bunting 93.76 | 10 – 9 | Kevin Doets 92.22 |
| Michael Smith 96.00 | 9 – 10 | Luke Woodhouse 97.45 | Dave Chisnall 98.67 | 10 – 6 | Mensur Suljović 91.67 |
| Vincent van der Voort 85.95 | 6 – 10 | Dimitri Van den Bergh 96.41 | Gary Anderson 92.72 | 10 – 5 | Chris Dobey 89.69 |
| Graham Usher 84.20 | 7 – 10 | Gian van Veen 93.57 | Rob Cross 105.19 | 10 – 4 | Josh Rock 98.51 |
| Jonny Clayton 92.93 | 10 – 8 | Ross Smith 97.49 | Benjamin Drue Reus 89.51 | 3 – 10 | Luke Humphries 101.01 |
| Damon Heta 96.47 | 10 – 9 | Nathan Aspinall 94.64 | Martin Lukeman 98.84 | 10 – 9 | Danny Noppert 97.93 |
| Keane Barry 92.50 | 10 – 3 | Ryan Meikle 85.12 | Krzysztof Ratajski 88.83 | 9 – 10 | Mervyn King 88.97 |

==== Sixth round (best of nineteen legs) ====
| Player | Score | Player | Player | Score | Player |
|---|---|---|---|---|---|
| Peter Wright 95.86 | 9 – 10 | Stephen Bunting 99.86 | Mervyn King 88.23 | 4 – 10 | Luke Humphries 99.93 |
| Jonny Clayton 92.90 | 7 – 10 | Dimitri Van den Bergh 90.06 | Damon Heta 93.94 | 10 – 8 | Gian van Veen 95.21 |
| Ricky Evans 91.50 | 10 – 6 | Luke Woodhouse 91.00 | Martin Lukeman 100.33 | 10 – 5 | Gary Anderson 102.57 |
| Rob Cross 96.64 | 10 – 4 | Keane Barry 91.34 | Luke Littler 103.38 | 10 – 5 | Dave Chisnall 101.63 |

=== Sunday 3 March ===
==== Quarter-finals (best of nineteen legs) ====
| Player | Score | Player |
|---|---|---|
| Stephen Bunting 98.07 | 2 – 10 | Luke Humphries 102.02 |
| Ricky Evans 85.68 | 10 – 7 | Rob Cross 87.45 |
| Damon Heta 106.04 | 10 – 8 | Luke Littler 104.77 |
| Martin Lukeman 95.56 | 5 – 10 | Dimitri Van den Bergh 93.91 |

==== Semi-finals and Final (best of twenty-one legs) ====
Semi-finals
Dimitri Van den Bergh 96.32 | 11
Damon Heta 95.55 | 6
Luke Humphries 98.86 | 11
Ricky Evans 87.41 | 2

Final
Dimitri Van den Bergh 95.18 | 11
Luke Humphries 96.07 | 10
