= List of players with a 2023 PDC Tour Card =

A 2023 Tour Card is needed to compete in Professional Darts Corporation ProTour tournaments.

In total 128 players are granted Tour Cards, which enables them to participate in all Players Championships and European Tour Qualifiers.

Most Tour Cards are valid for 2 years. The top 64 in the PDC Order of Merit all receive Tour Cards automatically, and those who won a two-year card in 2022 still have a valid card for 2023. The top player from the European and UK branches of the 2022 Challenge Tour and Development Tour received cards automatically. The remaining places were awarded at the 2023 Q-Schools, with the final four days of competition awarding two Tour Cards per day from the UK Q-School and one a day from the European Q-School; with the remaining players being ranked and the top players also receiving Tour Cards. All players who won a card at either Q-School have their Order of Merit ranking reset to zero.

No.	Country	Player	Prize money	Qualified through
1	England	Michael Smith	£1,243,500	Top 64 of Order of Merit
2	Scotland	Peter Wright	£1,144,500	Top 64 of Order of Merit
3	Netherlands	Michael van Gerwen	£1,050,750	Top 64 of Order of Merit
4	Wales	Gerwyn Price	£726,750	Top 64 of Order of Merit
5	England	Luke Humphries	£526,000	Top 64 of Order of Merit
6	England	Rob Cross	£512,000	Top 64 of Order of Merit
7	Wales	Jonny Clayton	£482,750	Top 64 of Order of Merit
8	Netherlands	Danny Noppert	£449,750	Top 64 of Order of Merit
9	England	Nathan Aspinall	£441,500	Top 64 of Order of Merit
10	England	James Wade	£440,000	Top 64 of Order of Merit
11	Belgium	Dimitri Van den Bergh	£411,750	Top 64 of Order of Merit
12	England	Joe Cullen	£367,750	Top 64 of Order of Merit
13	Netherlands	Dirk van Duijvenbode	£350,250	Top 64 of Order of Merit
14	Portugal	José de Sousa	£340,000	Top 64 of Order of Merit
15	England	Ryan Searle	£327,500	Top 64 of Order of Merit
16	Australia	Damon Heta	£311,250	Top 64 of Order of Merit
17	England	Ross Smith	£304,750	Top 64 of Order of Merit
18	England	Dave Chisnall	£294,000	Top 64 of Order of Merit
19	Germany	Gabriel Clemens	£286,250	Top 64 of Order of Merit
20	Poland	Krzysztof Ratajski	£281,750	Top 64 of Order of Merit
21	England	Chris Dobey	£274,000	Top 64 of Order of Merit
22	Scotland	Gary Anderson	£235,750	Top 64 of Order of Merit
23	England	Callan Rydz	£233,500	Top 64 of Order of Merit
24	England	Stephen Bunting	£232,750	Top 64 of Order of Merit
25	Northern Ireland	Brendan Dolan	£219,750	Top 64 of Order of Merit
26	Northern Ireland	Daryl Gurney	£195,250	Top 64 of Order of Merit
27	Germany	Martin Schindler	£189,250	Top 64 of Order of Merit
28	England	Mervyn King	£174,250	Top 64 of Order of Merit
29	Netherlands	Raymond van Barneveld	£165,750	Top 64 of Order of Merit
30	Netherlands	Vincent van der Voort	£165,750	Top 64 of Order of Merit
31	Belgium	Kim Huybrechts	£163,750	Top 64 of Order of Merit
32	Scotland	Alan Soutar	£161,500	Top 64 of Order of Merit
33	Austria	Mensur Suljović	£157,500	Top 64 of Order of Merit
34	England	Adrian Lewis	£139,750	Top 64 of Order of Merit
35	Latvia	Madars Razma	£138,500	Top 64 of Order of Merit
36	Northern Ireland	Josh Rock	£129,000	Top 64 of Order of Merit
37	Ireland	William O'Connor	£124,000	Top 64 of Order of Merit
38	Australia	Simon Whitlock	£123,500	Top 64 of Order of Merit
39	England	Martin Lukeman	£122,500	Top 64 of Order of Merit
40	Netherlands	Martijn Kleermaker	£119,000	Top 64 of Order of Merit
41	England	Andrew Gilding	£113,500	Top 64 of Order of Merit
42	Ireland	Keane Barry	£110,500	Top 64 of Order of Merit
43	England	Ian White	£106,250	Top 64 of Order of Merit
44	England	Ryan Joyce	£104,250	Top 64 of Order of Merit
45	England	Ryan Meikle	£97,000	Top 64 of Order of Merit
46	England	Ritchie Edhouse	£96,750	Top 64 of Order of Merit
47	Netherlands	Jermaine Wattimena	£96,250	Top 64 of Order of Merit
48	England	Ricky Evans	£95,000	Top 64 of Order of Merit
49	England	Luke Woodhouse	£92,500	Top 64 of Order of Merit
50	Germany	Florian Hempel	£86,000	Top 64 of Order of Merit
51	Austria	Rowby-John Rodriguez	£82,750	Top 64 of Order of Merit
52	Lithuania	Darius Labanauskas	£82,250	Top 64 of Order of Merit
53	Belgium	Mike De Decker	£80,500	Top 64 of Order of Merit
54	Croatia	Boris Krčmar	£80,500	Top 64 of Order of Merit
55	England	Steve Beaton	£80,000	Top 64 of Order of Merit
56	England	Jamie Hughes	£75,000	Top 64 of Order of Merit
57	England	Scott Williams	£73,000	Top 64 of Order of Merit
58	South Africa	Devon Petersen	£69,250	Top 64 of Order of Merit
59	Wales	Jim Williams	£68,250	Top 64 of Order of Merit
60	Wales	Lewy Williams	£67,000	Top 64 of Order of Merit
61	Ireland	Steve Lennon	£65,000	Top 64 of Order of Merit
62	Czech Republic	Adam Gawlas	£64,250	Top 64 of Order of Merit
63	England	Joe Murnan	£57,000	Top 64 of Order of Merit
64	Canada	Jeff Smith	£56,750	Top 64 of Order of Merit
65	Netherlands	Danny Jansen	£48,250	2022 Q-School
66	Scotland	Cameron Menzies	£47,750	2022 Q-School
67	Canada	Matt Campbell	£47,750	2021 EU Challenge Tour
68	Northern Ireland	Nathan Rafferty	£45,750	2022 Q-School
69	Northern Ireland	Mickey Mansell	£44,250	2022 Q-School
70	Ireland	John O'Shea	£36,500	2022 Q-School
71	England	Scott Waites	£26,750	2022 Q-School
72	Netherlands	Jimmy Hendriks	£26,000	2022 Q-School
73	Netherlands	Kevin Doets	£24,500	2022 Q-School
74	Spain	José Justicia	£23,000	2022 Q-School
75	Germany	Ricardo Pietreczko	£23,000	2022 Q-School
76	Wales	Richie Burnett	£22,000	2022 Q-School
77	England	Ted Evetts	£22,000	2022 Q-School
78	Belgium	Mario Vandenbogaerde	£20,250	2022 Q-School
79	England	Connor Scutt	£19,500	2022 Q-School
80	Poland	Krzysztof Kciuk	£18,000	2022 Q-School
81	Belgium	Brian Raman	£17,500	2022 Q-School
82	Austria	Rusty-Jake Rodriguez	£17,250	2021 EU Development Tour
83	Poland	Radek Szagański	£16,500	2022 Q-School
84	England	George Killington	£15,250	2022 Q-School
85	England	James Wilson	£15,000	2022 Q-School
86	England	Shaun Wilkinson	£14,750	2022 Q-School
87	Netherlands	Luc Peters	£13,000	2022 Q-School
88	Netherlands	Damian Mol	£12,250	2022 Q-School
89	Spain	Tony Martinez	£11,250	2022 Q-School
90	England	Bradley Brooks	£11,250	2021 UK Development Tour
91	Scotland	Jamie Clark	£11,000	2022 Q-School
92	Northern Ireland	Kevin Burness	£10,250	2022 Q-School
93	Scotland	Ross Montgomery	£9,750	2022 Q-School
94	United States	Jules van Dongen	£8,750	2022 Q-School
95	England	Nick Fullwell	£7,250	2022 Q-School
96	England	Darren Webster	£6,500	2022 Q-School
97	Denmark	Vladimir Andersen	£2,000	2022 Q-School
98	Wales	Robert Owen	£0	2022 Challenge Tour
99	Netherlands	Danny van Trijp	£0	2022 Challenge Tour
100	Netherlands	Geert Nentjes	£0	2022 Development Tour
101	Netherlands	Jurjen van der Velde	£0	2022 Development Tour
102	Netherlands	Jeffrey Sparidaans	£0	2023 Q-School
103	England	Arron Monk	£0	2023 Q-School
104	Australia	Corey Cadby	£0	2023 Q-School
105	England	Graham Usher	£0	2023 Q-School
106	Netherlands	Jeffrey de Zwaan	£0	2023 Q-School
107	England	Josh Payne	£0	2023 Q-School
108	Belgium	Robbie Knops	£0	2023 Q-School
109	England	Adam Smith-Neale	£0	2023 Q-School
110	Netherlands	Maik Kuivenhoven	£0	2023 Q-School
111	Netherlands	Richard Veenstra	£0	2023 Q-School
112	Netherlands	Niels Zonneveld	£0	2023 Q-School
113	Germany	Pascal Rupprecht	£0	2023 Q-School
114	Belgium	Ronny Huybrechts	£0	2023 Q-School
115	Czech Republic	Karel Sedláček	£0	2023 Q-School
116	France	Jacques Labre	£0	2023 Q-School
117	Germany	Daniel Klose	£0	2023 Q-School
118	Netherlands	Gian van Veen	£0	2023 Q-School
119	Netherlands	Owen Roelofs	£0	2023 Q-School
120	Ireland	Dylan Slevin	£0	2023 Q-School
121	England	Lee Evans	£0	2023 Q-School
122	England	Stephen Burton	£0	2023 Q-School
123	Wales	Nick Kenny	£0	2023 Q-School
124	England	Keegan Brown	£0	2023 Q-School
125	England	Adam Warner	£0	2023 Q-School
126	England	Graham Hall	£0	2023 Q-School
127	Wales	Callum Goffin	£0	2023 Q-School
128	Philippines	Christian Perez	£0	2023 Q-School

== Tour Cards per Nation ==
No.	Nation	Number of Tour card holders	Difference to prior year
1	England	44	−4
2	Netherlands	22	+4
3	Wales	8	+2
4	Belgium	7	+1
5	Germany	6	0
5	Northern Ireland	6	0
5	Scotland	6	–3
8	Ireland	5	+1
9	Australia	3	0
9	Austria	3	–1
9	Poland	3	0
12	Canada	2	0
12	Czech Republic	2	+1
12	Spain	2	0
15	Croatia	1	0
15	Denmark	1	0
15	France	1	+1
15	Latvia	1	0
15	Lithuania	1	0
15	Philippines	1	+1
15	Portugal	1	0
15	South Africa	1	0
15	United States	1	–1
	23 Nations	128	
