= 2025 World Seniors Darts Championship =

2025 BetGoodwin World Seniors Darts Championship

Tournament information
- Dates: 19–22 February 2025
- Venue: Circus Tavern
- Location: Purfleet, England
- Organisation(s): World Seniors Darts
- Format: Sets; Final – first to 5 sets
- Prize fund: £74,500
- Winner's share: £30,000
- High checkout: 160 Darryl Fitton

Champion(s)
- Ross Montgomery

The 2025 World Seniors Darts Championship (known for sponsorship reasons as the 2025 BetGoodwin World Seniors Darts Championship) was a darts tournament that was held from 19 to 22 February 2025 at the Circus Tavern in Purfleet, England. It was the fourth and final world championship to be organised by World Seniors Darts since the inaugural edition in 2022. The event was open to all players over the age of 45 without a 2025 PDC Tour Card. The tournament featured 28 players, with four seeded players starting in the second round while the remaining 24 players started in round one.

John Henderson was the defending champion, having defeated Colin McGarry 5‍–‍0 in the 2024 final. However, Henderson lost to Derek Coulson 3–1 in the quarter-finals. Ross Montgomery won the title in his debut by defeating Graham Usher 5‍–‍1 in the final to become the fourth consecutive Scottish champion. He was also crowned the last seniors World Champion, as the organisation announced in August 2025, that the 2026 edition was cancelled.

== Overview ==
The 2025 World Seniors Darts Championship, sponsored by online sportsbook BetGoodwin, was held from 19 to 22 February 2025 at the Circus Tavern in Purfleet, England. It was the fourth edition of the annual tournament organised by World Seniors Darts (formerly named World Seniors Darts Tour (WSDT); rebranded in November 2024 to coincide with the removal of ranked floor events from the schedule). The event was open to all players without a 2025 PDC Tour Card who are over the age of 45, a decrease in age limit from the previous cut-off of 50. John Henderson was the defending champion, having defeated Colin McGarry 5‍–‍0 in the 2024 final on debut.

=== Format ===
All matches were played as straight in (player begins scoring with their first throw no matter what section is hit), double out (a segment on the outer ring or the bullseye), requiring the players to score 501 points to win a leg, finishing on a double. Matches were played in set format with a minimum of three sets required to win.

=== Prize money ===
The prize fund was £74,500, with £30,000 going to the champion. This was £4,000 less than the 2023 and 2024 prize fund.

The full breakdown is shown below:

Position (no. of players)		Prize money (Total: £74,500)
Winner	(1)	£30,000
Runner-up	(1)	£12,500
Semi-finalists	(2)	£4,000
Quarter-finalists	(4)	£2,000
Second round	(8)	£1,000
First round	(12)	£750

== Qualifiers ==
John Henderson, Robert Thornton, Richie Howson and Leonard Gates entered the tournament in the second round as seeded players, with the remaining 24 players starting in the first round.

A number of 2024 PDC Tour Card holders were invited to the tournament after dropping off the tour. Steve Beaton, who announced his intention to retire from professional darts at the end of 2024, was confirmed to have accepted his invite to the tournament in July 2024. He was followed by Vincent van der Voort, before Simon Whitlock and Mervyn King were also confirmed to participate after the culmination of 2025 PDC Q-School.

Three qualifying tournaments were held on 1 and 2 February to determine the last three players in the field. They were won by Graham Usher, Richie Burnett and Michael Huntley.

On 20 February, it was announced that Vincent van der Voort withdrew from the tournament due to medical reasons. His scheduled first-round opponent, Neil Duff, received a walkover to the next round.

Seeded players

1. John Henderson (quarter-finals)
2. Robert Thornton (quarter-finals)
3. Richie Howson (second round)
4. Leonard Gates (quarter-finals)

Ranking/Invited Players
- Colin McGarry (first round)
- Paul Hogan (second round)
- Kevin Painter (first round)
- Martin Adams (first round)
- Neil Duff (second round)
- Richard-Eirig Rowlands (first round)
- Jim McEwan (first round)
- Ross Montgomery (champion)
- Derek Coulson (semi-finals)
- Kevin Edwards (first round)
- Mark Dudbridge (first round)
- Tony O'Shea (second round)
- John Part (second round)
- Steve Beaton (semi-finals)
- Lisa Ashton (first round)
- Trina Gulliver (first round)
- Chris Mason (second round)
- ~~Vincent van der Voort~~ (withdrew)
- Darryl Fitton (second round)
- Simon Whitlock (first round)
- Mervyn King (first round)

Qualifiers

1. Graham Usher (runner-up)
2. Richie Burnett (quarter-finals)
3. Michael Huntley (second round)

== Draw ==
The draw was conducted live on the Online Darts YouTube channel. Numbers to the left of players' names show the seedings for the top 4 in the tournament. The three qualifiers are indicated by a (Q). The figures to the right of a player's name state their three-dart average in a match. Players in bold denote match winners.

**First round** (best of 5 sets); 19–20 February
Mark Dudbridge 77.82	1
**Chris Mason 78.69**	**3**
**Derek Coulson 96.36**	**3**
Mervyn King 95.28	1
**Tony O'Shea 74.38**	**3**
Lisa Ashton 75.65	2
Kevin Edwards 83.12	2
**Q**	**Michael Huntley 81.66**	**3**
Richard-Eirig Rowlands 83.31	0
**Q**	**Graham Usher 85.99**	**3**
**Neil Duff**	**w/o**
Vincent van der Voort	w/d
Kevin Painter 79.92	2
**Q**	**Richie Burnett 82.49**	**3**
Colin McGarry 86.09	2
**Steve Beaton 86.24**	**3**
**Paul Hogan 83.66**	**3**
Simon Whitlock 83.69	1
Martin Adams 72.67	0
**Darryl Fitton 85.23**	**3**
Jim McEwan 80.35	2
**John Part 84.02**	**3**
**Ross Montgomery 92.93**	**3**
Trina Gulliver 76.52	0

**Second round** (best of 5 sets); 21 February
**1**	**John Henderson 85.96**	**3**
Chris Mason 78.44	2
**Derek Coulson 83.31**	**3**
Tony O'Shea 72.60	0
**4**	**Leonard Gates 89.94**	**3**
Q	Michael Huntley 81.33	1
**Q**	**Graham Usher 83.61**	**3**
Neil Duff 81.10	1
3	Richie Howson 81.34	1
**Q**	**Richie Burnett 81.91**	**3**
**Steve Beaton 83.83**	**3**
Paul Hogan 81.05	0
**2**	**Robert Thornton 89.66**	**3**
Darryl Fitton 84.04	1
John Part 82.25	2
**Ross Montgomery 85.79**	**3**

**Quarter-finals** (best of 5 sets); 22 February
1	John Henderson 87.62	1
**Derek Coulson 88.41**	**3**
4	Leonard Gates 89.08	1
**Q**	**Graham Usher 87.15**	**3**
Q	Richie Burnett 82.42	0
**Steve Beaton 86.93**	**3**
2	Robert Thornton 82.05	1
**Ross Montgomery 91.51**	**3**

**Semi-finals** (best of 5 sets); 22 February
Derek Coulson 84.21	0
**Q**	**Graham Usher 87.55**	**3**
Steve Beaton 88.12	1
**Ross Montgomery 86.48**	**3**

**Final** (best of 9 sets); 22 February
Q	Graham Usher 82.79	1
**Ross Montgomery 82.27**	**5**

== Broadcasting rights ==
Live coverage of the event will be available on BBC iPlayer, the BBC Sport website and app, and the BBC Red Button; as well as TNT Sports and Discovery+.
