= 2023 Baltic Sea Darts Open =

2023 edition of Baltic Sea Darts Open

2023 Interwetten Baltic Sea Darts Open

Tournament information
- Dates: 24–26 February 2023
- Venue: Wunderino Arena
- Location: Kiel, Germany
- Organisation(s): Professional Darts Corporation (PDC)
- Format: Legs
- Prize fund: £175,000
- Winner's share: £30,000
- High checkout: 170 Keegan Brown

Champion(s)
- Dave Chisnall (ENG)

The 2023 Interwetten Baltic Sea Darts Open was the first of thirteen PDC European Tour events on the 2023 PDC Pro Tour. The tournament took place at the Wunderino Arena, Kiel, Germany from 24 to 26 February 2023. It featured a field of 48 players and £175,000 in prize money, with £30,000 going to the winner.

Dave Chisnall won his fourth European Tour title by defeating Luke Humphries 8–5 in the final.

The event also saw 239 scores of 180 hit during the tournament, beating the previous European Tour record of 231.

== Prize money ==
The prize money was increased for the first time in 4 years for all European Tours:

Stage (num. of players)		Prize money
Winner	(1)	£30,000
Runner-up	(1)	£12,000
Semi-finalists	(2)	£8,500
Quarter-finalists	(4)	£6,000
Third round losers	(8)	£4,000
Second round losers	(16)	£2,500*
First round losers	(16)	£1,250
Total	£175,000	

- Seeded players who lost in the second round of the event were not credited with prize money on any Order of Merit.

== Qualification and format ==
The top 16 entrants from the PDC Pro Tour Order of Merit on 31 January 2023 automatically qualified for the event and were seeded in the second round.

The remaining 32 places went to players from six qualifying events – 24 from the Tour Card Holder Qualifier (held on 13 February), two from the Associate Member Qualifier (held on 10 February), the two highest ranked Germans automatically qualified, alongside two from the Host Nation Qualifier (held on 10 February), one from the Nordic & Baltic Associate Member Qualifier (held on 17 February), and one from the East European Associate Member Qualifier (held on 11 February).

The following players took part in the tournament:

Top 16

1. Luke Humphries (ENG) (runner-up)
2. Michael van Gerwen (NED) (second round)
3. Damon Heta (AUS) (third round)
4. Rob Cross (ENG) (second round)
5. Peter Wright (SCO) (third round)
6. Dave Chisnall (ENG) (champion)
7. Nathan Aspinall (ENG) (second round)
8. Michael Smith (ENG) (third round)
9. Dirk van Duijvenbode (NED) (quarter-finals)
10. Joe Cullen (ENG) (third round)
11. Gerwyn Price (WAL) (third round)
12. Danny Noppert (NED) (second round)
13. Ryan Searle (ENG) (semi-finals)
14. Martin Schindler (GER) (quarter-finals)
15. Jonny Clayton (WAL) (semi-finals)
16. Dimitri Van den Bergh (BEL) (third round)

Tour Card Qualifier
- Ricky Evans (ENG) (first round)
- Graham Usher (ENG) (second round)
- Arron Monk (ENG) (second round)
- Ryan Joyce (ENG) (first round)
- Mario Vandenbogaerde (BEL) (second round)
- Raymond van Barneveld (NED) (first round)
- Stephen Bunting (ENG) (third round)
- Keegan Brown (ENG) (quarter-finals)
- James Wade (ENG) (second round)
- Ritchie Edhouse (ENG) (second round)
- Richard Veenstra (NED) (second round)
- Shaun Wilkinson (ENG) (first round)
- Niels Zonneveld (NED) (first round)
- Steve Beaton (ENG) (quarter-finals)
- Lewy Williams (WAL) (second round)
- Bradley Brooks (ENG) (second round)
- Adrian Lewis (ENG) (first round)
- Ryan Meikle (ENG) (first round)
- Josh Payne (ENG) (first round)
- Jermaine Wattimena (NED) (first round)
- Brendan Dolan (NIR) (first round)
- William O'Connor (IRL) (first round)
- Daryl Gurney (NIR) (second round)
- Ted Evetts (ENG) (second round)

Associate Member Qualifier
- Martijn Dragt (NED) (third round)
- Jeroen Mioch (NED) (first round)

Highest Ranking Germans
- Gabriel Clemens (GER) (first round)
- Florian Hempel (GER) (first round)

Host Nation Qualifier
- Niko Springer (GER) (second round)
- Lukas Wenig (GER) (second round)

Nordic & Baltic Qualifier
- Dennis Nilsson (SWE) (first round)

East European Qualifier
- Filip Šebesta (CZE) (first round)

== Draw ==
The draw was confirmed on 23 February.

First round (best of 11 legs); 24 February
Gabriel Clemens 98.55	5
Daryl Gurney 97.27	6
Shaun Wilkinson 85.23	2
Ritchie Edhouse 92.80	6
Jermaine Wattimena 91.56	4
Niko Springer 97.59	6
Florian Hempel 82.99	2
Richard Veenstra 90.35	6
Ricky Evans 90.17	2
Martijn Dragt 90.35	6
Niels Zonneveld 90.61	5
Mario Vandenbogaerde 86.72	6
James Wade 92.17	6
Raymond van Barneveld 89.53	3
Filip Šebesta 82.99	3
Keegan Brown 89.08	6
William O'Connor 95.09	4
Stephen Bunting 97.29	6
Jeroen Mioch 91.12	3
Ted Evetts 89.59	6
Steve Beaton 106.10	6
Adrian Lewis 99.68	2
Arron Monk 91.92	6
Brendan Dolan 93.97	5
Bradley Brooks 83.35	6
Josh Payne 83.02	2
Ryan Meikle 80.69	1
Lukas Wenig 90.84	6
Lewy Williams 98.48	6
Dennis Nilsson 85.89	3
Ryan Joyce 81.47	3
Graham Usher 84.04	6

Second round (best of 11 legs); 25 February
1	Luke Humphries 98.80	6
Daryl Gurney 92.82	1
16	Dimitri Van den Bergh 97.77	6
Ritchie Edhouse 96.96	3
8	Michael Smith 93.62	6
Niko Springer 88.12	4
9	Dirk van Duijvenbode 88.36	6
Richard Veenstra 87.55	3
4	Rob Cross 93.82	5
Martijn Dragt 88.29	6
13	Ryan Searle 95.48	6
Mario Vandenbogaerde 90.19	1
5	Peter Wright 96.60	6
James Wade 94.59	3
12	Danny Noppert 89.78	3
Keegan Brown 90.38	6
2	Michael van Gerwen 98.31	4
Stephen Bunting 96.92	6
15	Jonny Clayton 97.10	6
Ted Evetts 88.31	1
7	Nathan Aspinall 92.30	5
Steve Beaton 92.53	6
10	Joe Cullen 95.94	6
Arron Monk 98.43	4
3	Damon Heta 101.53	6
Bradley Brooks 91.76	2
14	Martin Schindler 98.14	6
Lukas Wenig 94.00	4
6	Dave Chisnall 100.75	6
Lewy Williams 94.93	2
11	Gerwyn Price 109.07	6
Graham Usher 88.98	2

Third round (best of 11 legs); 26 February
1	Humphries 94.23	6
16	Van den Bergh 90.51	3
8	Smith 99.27	3
9	van Duijvenbode 100.27	6
Dragt 97.21	2
13	Searle 100.12	6
5	Wright 88.74	4
Brown 94.47	6
Bunting 94.17	2
15	Clayton 95.85	6
Beaton 86.23	6
10	Cullen 88.06	4
3	Heta 91.00	2
14	Schindler 96.55	6
6	Chisnall 107.04	6
11	Price 108.29	4

Quarter-finals (best of 11 legs); 26 February
1	Humphries 100.50	6
9	van Duijvenbode 100.91	4
13	Searle 99.14	6
Brown 81.95	1
15	Clayton 102.84	6
Beaton 85.61	2
14	Schindler 89.48	4
6	Chisnall 88.14	6

Semi-finals (best of 13 legs); 26 February
1	Humphries 97.04	7
13	Searle 101.02	6
15	Clayton 97.38	5
6	Chisnall 94.16	7

Final (best of 15 legs); 26 February
1	Humphries 96.27	5
6	Chisnall 101.31	8
