= Graeme Hall =

Graeme Hall may refer to:

- Graeme Hall (dog trainer) (born 1966)
- Graeme Hall (weightlifter) (1942–2015), Australian weightlifter
- Graeme Hall (rower) (1946–1985), British rower

== See also ==
- Graeme Hall Nature Sanctuary, wetland at Graeme Hall, in Christ Church, Barbados
- Graham Hall
