= 2017 German Darts Grand Prix =

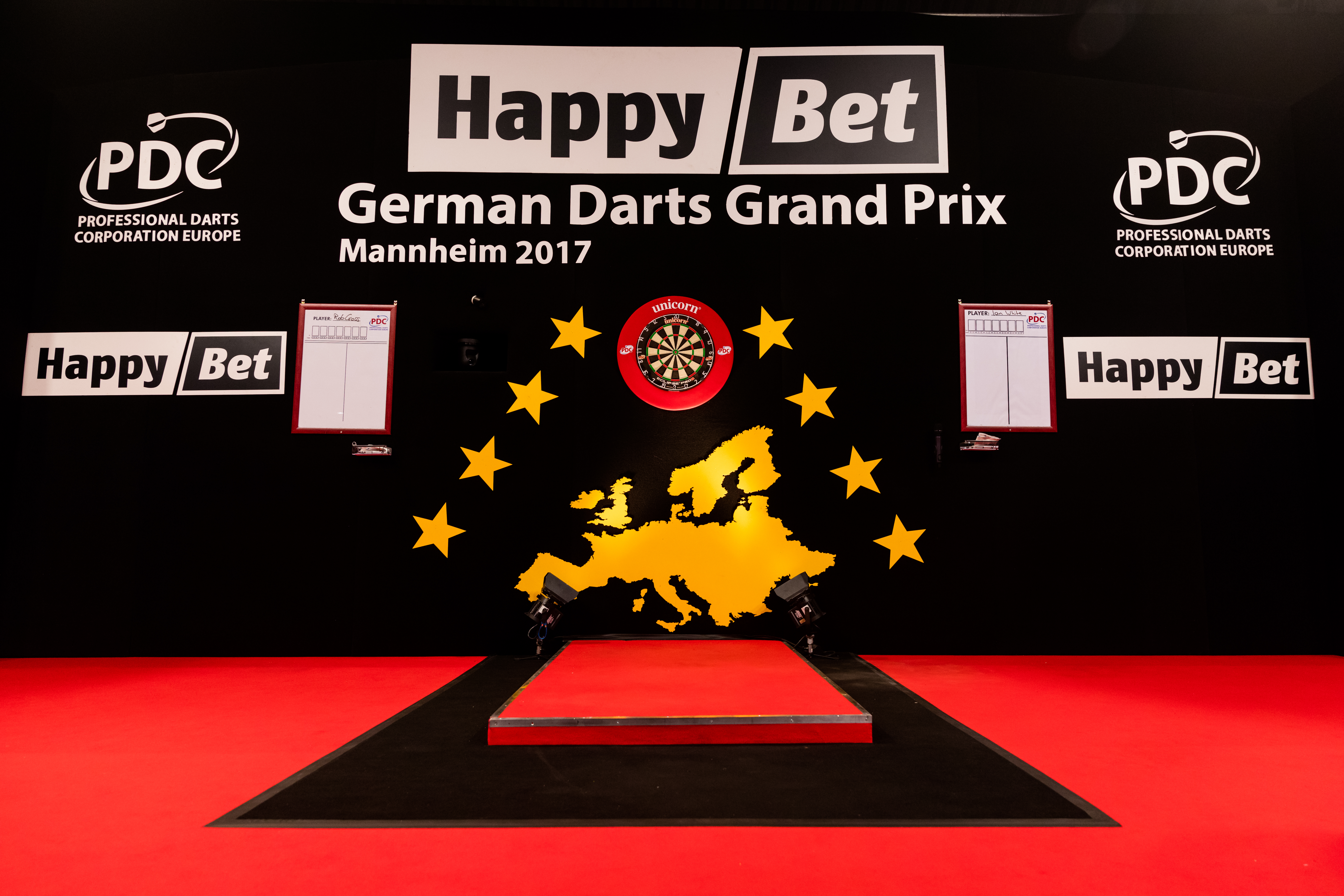

Tournament information
- Dates: 8–10 September 2017
- Venue: Maimarkthalle
- Location: Mannheim, Germany
- Organisation(s): Professional Darts Corporation (PDC)
- Format: Legs; First to 6 legs
- Prize fund: £135,000
- Winner's share: £25,000
- High checkout: 160 Tony Martinez

Champion(s)
- Michael van Gerwen (NED)

The 2017 German Darts Grand Prix was the tenth of twelve PDC European Tour events on the 2017 PDC Pro Tour. The tournament took place at Maimarkthalle, Mannheim, Germany, from 8 to 10 September 2017. It featured a field of 48 players and £135,000 in prize money, with £25,000 going to the winner.

Michael van Gerwen won the tournament, defeating Rob Cross 6–3 in the final.

== Prize money ==
This is how the prize money is divided:

Stage (num. of players)		Prize money
Winner	(1)	£25,000
Runner-up	(1)	£10,000
Semi-finalists	(2)	£6,000
Quarter-finalists	(4)	£4,000
Third round losers	(8)	£3,000
Second round losers	(16)	£2,000
First round losers	(16)	£1,000
Total	£135,000	

== Qualification and format ==
The top 16 entrants from the PDC ProTour Order of Merit on 30 June automatically qualified for the event and were seeded in the second round.

The remaining 32 places went to players from five qualifying events – 18 from the UK Qualifier (held in Barnsley on 4 August), eight from the West/South European Qualifier (held on 31 August), four from the Host Nation Qualifier (held on 31 August), one from the Nordic & Baltic Qualifier (held on 11 August) and one from the East European Qualifier (held on 26 August).

The following players took part in the tournament:

Top 16
1. (Netherlands) Michael van Gerwen (winner)
2. (Scotland) Peter Wright (second round)
3. (Austria) Mensur Suljović (third round)
4. (Australia) Simon Whitlock (semi-finals)
5. (England) Michael Smith (quarter-finals)
6. (Northern Ireland) Daryl Gurney (third round)
7. (England) Alan Norris (second round)
8. (Belgium) Kim Huybrechts (second round)
9. (Netherlands) Jelle Klaasen (quarter-finals)
10. (Netherlands) Benito van de Pas (semi-finals)
11. (England) Ian White (quarter-finals)
12. (England) Joe Cullen (third round)
13. (England) Dave Chisnall (second round)
14. (England) Rob Cross (runner-up)
15. (England) Mervyn King (second round)
16. (Wales) Gerwyn Price (third round)

UK Qualifier
- (Wales) Robert Owen (first round)
- (England) Andy Boulton (first round)
- (England) Darren Webster (third round)
- (England) Steve Beaton (first round)
- (Scotland) Jamie Bain (second round)
- (England) Andrew Gilding (first round)
- (Australia) Kyle Anderson (third round)
- (Wales) Jamie Lewis (second round)
- (Northern Ireland) Mickey Mansell (first round)
- (England) Keegan Brown (second round)
- (England) Paul Rowley (first round)
- (England) Jamie Caven (second round)
- (England) Mick Todd (first round)
- (England) Nathan Aspinall (third round)
- (England) James Richardson (first round)
- (England) Richard North (second round)
- (Republic of Ireland) Mick McGowan (second round)
- (England) Ryan Meikle (first round)

West/South European Qualifier
- (Netherlands) Dirk van Duijvenbode (first round)
- (Austria) Zoran Lerchbacher (first round)
- (Netherlands) Vincent van der Voort (quarter-finals)
- (Belgium) Ronny Huybrechts (third round)
- (Netherlands) Jermaine Wattimena (second round)
- (Netherlands) Michael Plooy (first round)
- (Netherlands) Jan Dekker (second round)
- (Spain) Tony Martinez (second round)

Host Nation Qualifier
- (Germany) Michael Hurtz (first round)
- (Germany) Max Hopp (first round)
- (Germany) Bernd Roith (first round)
- (Germany) Martin Schindler (first round)

Nordic & Baltic Qualifier
- (Sweden) Daniel Larsson (second round)

East European Qualifier
- (Poland) Krzysztof Ratajski (second round)

== Draw ==
First round (best of 11 legs); 8 September
(England) Richard North 86.54	6
(England) Mick Todd 86.21	3
(Wales) Robert Owen 103.23	4
(Poland) Krzysztof Ratajski 95.64	6
(Australia) Kyle Anderson 101.44	6
(Netherlands) Dirk van Duijvenbode 100.85	4
(England) Steve Beaton 89.42	4
(Scotland) Jamie Bain 90.63	6
(Wales) Jamie Lewis 94.89	6
(England) Andy Boulton 95.60	5
(England) Paul Rowley 83.70	3
(Spain) Tony Martinez 93.04	6
(Sweden) Daniel Larsson 87.30	6
(Germany) Michael Hurtz 78.77	1
(England) Nathan Aspinall 97.20	6
(Germany) Bernd Roith 94.63	3
(Belgium) Ronny Huybrechts 91.38	6
(Austria) Zoran Lerchbacher 89.56	3
(Netherlands) Vincent van der Voort 88.62	6
(England) Andrew Gilding 84.88	2
(England) Darren Webster 101.13	6
(England) Ryan Meikle 96.14	5
(England) Jamie Caven 86.37	6
(Germany) Max Hopp 81.19	4
(England) Keegan Brown 88.16	6
(England) James Richardson 87.55	2
(Netherlands) Jermaine Wattimena 87.49	6
(Netherlands) Michael Plooy 83.21	4
(Republic of Ireland) Mick McGowan 94.85	6
(Germany) Martin Schindler 94.69	3
(Netherlands) Jan Dekker 87.04	6
(Northern Ireland) Mickey Mansell 92.14	3

Second round (best of 11 legs); 9 September
1	(Netherlands) Michael van Gerwen 111.33	6
(England) Richard North 79.50	0
16	(Wales) Gerwyn Price 91.44	6
(Poland) Krzysztof Ratajski 89.89	3
8	(Belgium) Kim Huybrechts 96.45	4
(Australia) Kyle Anderson 102.17	6
9	(Netherlands) Jelle Klaasen 84.54	6
(Scotland) Jamie Bain 93.58	4
5	(England) Michael Smith 90.26	6
(Wales) Jamie Lewis 99.57	5
12	(England) Joe Cullen 108.30	6
(Spain) Tony Martinez 93.00	3
4	(Australia) Simon Whitlock 80.87	6
(Sweden) Daniel Larsson 68.15	2
13	(England) Dave Chisnall 97.74	2
(England) Nathan Aspinall 89.20	6
2	(Scotland) Peter Wright 96.74	2
(Belgium) Ronny Huybrechts 96.40	6
15	(England) Mervyn King 99.54	5
(Netherlands) Vincent van der Voort 101.07	6
7	(England) Alan Norris 75.45	3
(England) Darren Webster 83.35	6
10	(Netherlands) Benito van de Pas 97.94	6
(England) Jamie Caven 92.72	2
6	(Northern Ireland) Daryl Gurney 97.96	6
(England) Keegan Brown 88.70	1
11	(England) Ian White 95.42	6
(Netherlands) Jermaine Wattimena 96.70	4
3	(Austria) Mensur Suljović 87.52	6
(Republic of Ireland) Mick McGowan 79.53	1
14	(England) Rob Cross 103.81	6
(Netherlands) Jan Dekker 97.98	3

Third round (best of 11 legs); 10 September
1	(Netherlands) van Gerwen 98.68	6
16	(Wales) Price 93.40	2
(Australia) Anderson 88.09	1
9	(Netherlands) Klaasen 92.58	6
5	(England) Smith 89.46	6
12	(England) Cullen 86.04	1
4	(Australia) Whitlock 96.09	6
(England) Aspinall 91.71	3
(Belgium) R. Huybrechts 86.33	0
(Netherlands) van der Voort 96.97	6
(England) Webster 92.46	2
10	(Netherlands) van de Pas 94.81	6
6	(Northern Ireland) Gurney 92.41	5
11	(England) White 94.37	6
3	(Austria) Suljović 92.39	2
14	(England) Cross 109.10	6

Quarter-finals (best of 11 legs); 10 September
1	(Netherlands) van Gerwen 102.56	6
9	(Netherlands) Klaasen 92.82	1
5	(England) Smith 90.46	1
4	(Australia) Whitlock 85.66	6
(Netherlands) van der Voort 90.24	5
10	(Netherlands) van de Pas 84.78	6
11	(England) White 96.14	2
14	(England) Cross 105.89	6

Semi-finals (best of 11 legs); 10 September
1	(Netherlands) van Gerwen 100.20	6
4	(Australia) Whitlock 92.10	0
10	(Netherlands) van de Pas 95.85	3
14	(England) Cross 102.87	6

Final (best of 11 legs); 10 September
1	(Netherlands) van Gerwen 111.00	6
14	(England) Cross 93.38	3
