= List of players with a 2024 PDC Tour Card =

A 2024 Tour Card is needed to compete in Professional Darts Corporation ProTour tournaments.

In total 128 players are granted Tour Cards, which enables them to participate in all Players Championships and European Tour Qualifiers.

Most Tour Cards are valid for 2 years. The top 64 in the PDC Order of Merit all receive Tour Cards automatically, and those who won a two-year card in 2023 still have a valid card for 2024. The top two players from the 2023 Challenge Tour and Development Tour received cards automatically. The remaining places were awarded at the 2024 Q-Schools, with the final four days of competition awarding one Tour Card per day from both the UK & European Q-Schools; with the remaining players being ranked and the top players also receiving Tour Cards. All players who won a card at either Q-School have their Order of Merit ranking reset to zero.

Corey Cadby's Tour Card, which he won at the 2023 Q-School, was removed as he had not competed in a single ProTour event since winning it.

No.	Country	Player	Prize money	Qualified through
1	England	Luke Humphries	£1,495,500	Top 64 of Order of Merit
2	Netherlands	Michael van Gerwen	£1,132,250	Top 64 of Order of Merit
3	England	Michael Smith	£1,106,250	Top 64 of Order of Merit
4	England	Nathan Aspinall	£637,500	Top 64 of Order of Merit
5	Wales	Gerwyn Price	£637,250	Top 64 of Order of Merit
6	England	Rob Cross	£590,500	Top 64 of Order of Merit
7	Netherlands	Danny Noppert	£527,750	Top 64 of Order of Merit
8	Scotland	Peter Wright	£511,250	Top 64 of Order of Merit
9	Wales	Jonny Clayton	£490,000	Top 64 of Order of Merit
10	England	Dave Chisnall	£489,500	Top 64 of Order of Merit
11	Australia	Damon Heta	£478,250	Top 64 of Order of Merit
12	England	Joe Cullen	£440,750	Top 64 of Order of Merit
13	Netherlands	Dirk van Duijvenbode	£438,750	Top 64 of Order of Merit
14	Belgium	Dimitri Van den Bergh	£408,000	Top 64 of Order of Merit
15	England	Chris Dobey	£378,750	Top 64 of Order of Merit
16	England	Stephen Bunting	£371,250	Top 64 of Order of Merit
17	England	Ross Smith	£371,000	Top 64 of Order of Merit
18	England	Andrew Gilding	£358,000	Top 64 of Order of Merit
19	England	James Wade	£349,000	Top 64 of Order of Merit
20	England	Ryan Searle	£334,750	Top 64 of Order of Merit
21	Northern Ireland	Josh Rock	£324,500	Top 64 of Order of Merit
22	Germany	Gabriel Clemens	£321,000	Top 64 of Order of Merit
23	Germany	Martin Schindler	£300,250	Top 64 of Order of Merit
24	Poland	Krzysztof Ratajski	£298,500	Top 64 of Order of Merit
25	Portugal	José de Sousa	£274,000	Top 64 of Order of Merit
26	Northern Ireland	Daryl Gurney	£269,250	Top 64 of Order of Merit
27	Scotland	Gary Anderson	£267,250	Top 64 of Order of Merit
28	Northern Ireland	Brendan Dolan	£259,000	Top 64 of Order of Merit
29	Netherlands	Raymond van Barneveld	£230,500	Top 64 of Order of Merit
30	England	Scott Williams	£205,750	Top 64 of Order of Merit
31	England	Luke Littler	£202,500	Top 64 of Order of Merit
32	Belgium	Kim Huybrechts	£186,750	Top 64 of Order of Merit
33	Latvia	Madars Razma	£175,750	Top 64 of Order of Merit
34	England	Callan Rydz	£170,750	Top 64 of Order of Merit
35	England	Martin Lukeman	£163,500	Top 64 of Order of Merit
36	Germany	Ricardo Pietreczko	£157,250	Top 64 of Order of Merit
37	England	Ryan Joyce	£151,250	Top 64 of Order of Merit
38	England	Luke Woodhouse	£150,250	Top 64 of Order of Merit
39	Belgium	Mike De Decker	£139,000	Top 64 of Order of Merit
40	Wales	Jim Williams	£137,750	Top 64 of Order of Merit
41	Ireland	Keane Barry	£128,500	Top 64 of Order of Merit
42	Ireland	William O'Connor	£128,250	Top 64 of Order of Merit
43	Netherlands	Gian van Veen	£122,500	Top 64 of Order of Merit
44	Australia	Simon Whitlock	£120,250	Top 64 of Order of Merit
45	Scotland	Alan Soutar	£118,500	Top 64 of Order of Merit
46	England	Ricky Evans	£115,500	Top 64 of Order of Merit
47	Netherlands	Jermaine Wattimena	£113,500	Top 64 of Order of Merit
48	Canada	Matt Campbell	£113,250	Top 64 of Order of Merit
49	Austria	Rowby-John Rodriguez	£111,500	Top 64 of Order of Merit
50	England	Steve Beaton	£111,250	Top 64 of Order of Merit
51	Croatia	Boris Krčmar	£101,750	Top 64 of Order of Merit
52	England	Adrian Lewis	£101,250	Top 64 of Order of Merit
53	Netherlands	Vincent van der Voort	£97,000	Top 64 of Order of Merit
54	Scotland	Cameron Menzies	£94,500	Top 64 of Order of Merit
55	Austria	Mensur Suljović	£94,000	Top 64 of Order of Merit
56	Northern Ireland	Mickey Mansell	£93,500	Top 64 of Order of Merit
57	England	Jamie Hughes	£91,250	Top 64 of Order of Merit
58	England	Ritchie Edhouse	£89,500	Top 64 of Order of Merit
59	England	Ryan Meikle	£87,000	Top 64 of Order of Merit
60	Germany	Florian Hempel	£86,750	Top 64 of Order of Merit
61	Czech Republic	Adam Gawlas	£86,500	Top 64 of Order of Merit
62	Netherlands	Kevin Doets	£83,500	Top 64 of Order of Merit
63	England	Mervyn King	£81,750	Top 64 of Order of Merit
64	England	Ian White	£80,750	Top 64 of Order of Merit
65	Netherlands	Richard Veenstra	£67,500	2023 Q-School
66	Netherlands	Niels Zonneveld	£51,500	2023 Q-School
67	England	Lee Evans	£45,000	2023 Q-School
68	Ireland	Dylan Slevin	£42,750	2023 Q-School
69	England	Keegan Brown	£32,750	2023 Q-School
70	Netherlands	Maik Kuivenhoven	£29,750	2023 Q-School
71	Netherlands	Jeffrey de Zwaan	£28,500	2023 Q-School
72	England	Stephen Burton	£27,250	2023 Q-School
73	Germany	Daniel Klose	£26,000	2023 Q-School
74	Czech Republic	Karel Sedláček	£22,000	2023 Q-School
75	England	Arron Monk	£20,000	2023 Q-School
76	Netherlands	Jurjen van der Velde	£19,750	2022 Development Tour
77	Wales	Robert Owen	£18,000	2022 Challenge Tour
78	Netherlands	Jeffrey Sparidaans	£18,000	2023 Q-School
79	Germany	Pascal Rupprecht	£18,000	2023 Q-School
80	England	Graham Usher	£15,750	2023 Q-School
81	England	Josh Payne	£15,500	2023 Q-School
82	England	Graham Hall	£15,500	2023 Q-School
83	Wales	Nick Kenny	£13,750	2023 Q-School
84	England	Adam Smith-Neale	£13,750	2023 Q-School
85	Netherlands	Geert Nentjes	£13,500	2022 Development Tour
86	Belgium	Ronny Huybrechts	£12,250	2023 Q-School
87	Netherlands	Owen Roelofs	£11,000	2023 Q-School
88	England	Adam Warner	£10,000	2023 Q-School
89	Netherlands	Danny van Trijp	£9,500	2022 Challenge Tour
90	Belgium	Robbie Knops	£8,750	2023 Q-School
91	Wales	Callum Goffin	£7,750	2023 Q-School
92	France	Jacques Labre	£4,750	2023 Q-School
93	Philippines	Christian Perez	£3,000	2023 Q-School
94	Netherlands	Berry van Peer	£0	2023 Challenge Tour
95	England	Owen Bates	£0	2023 Challenge Tour
96	Netherlands	Wessel Nijman	£0	2023 Development Tour
97	Northern Ireland	Nathan Rafferty	£0	2023 Development Tour
98	Ireland	Steve Lennon	£0	2024 Q-School
99	Netherlands	Martijn Dragt	£0	2024 Q-School
100	England	Robert Grundy	£0	2024 Q-School
101	Netherlands	Jelle Klaasen	£0	2024 Q-School
102	United States	Jules van Dongen	£0	2024 Q-School
103	New Zealand	Haupai Puha	£0	2024 Q-School
104	Belgium	Andy Baetens	£0	2024 Q-School
105	England	Leighton Bennett	£0	2024 Q-School
106	Poland	Radek Szagański	£0	2024 Q-School
107	Netherlands	Patrick Geeraets	£0	2024 Q-School
108	Scotland	William Borland	£0	2024 Q-School
109	Denmark	Benjamin Drue Reus	£0	2024 Q-School
110	England	Matthew Dennant	£0	2024 Q-School
111	England	George Killington	£0	2024 Q-School
112	England	James Hurrell	£0	2024 Q-School
113	Netherlands	Chris Landman	£0	2024 Q-School
114	Germany	Lukas Wenig	£0	2024 Q-School
115	Belgium	Mario Vandenbogaerde	£0	2024 Q-School
116	Germany	Paul Krohne	£0	2024 Q-School
117	England	Dom Taylor	£0	2024 Q-School
118	United States	Danny Lauby	£0	2024 Q-School
119	Italy	Michele Turetta	£0	2024 Q-School
120	England	Joshua Richardson	£0	2024 Q-School
121	Wales	Rhys Griffin	£0	2024 Q-School
122	England	Brett Claydon	£0	2024 Q-School
123	Germany	Tim Wolters	£0	2024 Q-School
124	France	Thibault Tricole	£0	2024 Q-School
125	Scotland	Darren Beveridge	£0	2024 Q-School
126	Netherlands	Jitse van der Wal	£0	2024 Q-School
127	England	Adam Hunt	£0	2024 Q-School
128	Sweden	Jeffrey de Graaf	£0	2024 Q-School

== Tour Cards per Nation ==
No.	Nation	Number of Tour card holders	Difference to prior year
1	England	45	+1
2	Netherlands	24	+2
3	Germany	9	+3
4	Belgium	7	0
4	Wales	7	–1
6	Scotland	6	0
7	Northern Ireland	5	–1
8	Ireland	4	–1
9	Australia	2	–1
9	Austria	2	–1
9	Czech Republic	2	0
9	France	2	+1
9	Poland	2	–1
9	United States	2	+1
15	Canada	1	–1
15	Croatia	1	0
15	Denmark	1	0
15	Italy	1	+1
15	Latvia	1	0
15	New Zealand	1	+1
15	Philippines	1	0
15	Portugal	1	0
15	Sweden	1	+1
—	Lithuania	0	–1
—	Spain	0	–2
—	South Africa	0	–1
	23 Nations	128	
