= 2022 Austrian Darts Open =

2022 edition of Austrian Darts Open

2022 Interwetten Austrian Darts Open

Tournament information
- Dates: 29 April–1 May 2022
- Venue: Premstättner Halle
- Location: Graz, Austria
- Organisation(s): PDC
- Format: Legs
- Prize fund: £140,000
- Winner's share: £25,000
- High checkout: 170 Cameron Menzies; Michael van Gerwen

Champion(s)
- Michael van Gerwen

The 2022 Interwetten Austrian Darts Open was the fourth of thirteen PDC European Tour events on the 2022 PDC Pro Tour. The tournament was held at the Premstättner Halle in Graz, Austria, from 29 April to 1 May 2022. It featured a field of 48 players and £140,000 in prize money, with £25,000 going to the winner.

Michael van Gerwen entered the event as the defending champion, having defeated Ian White 8–7 in the 2019 final. He successfully defended his title with an 8–5 win over Danny Noppert in the final.

== Prize money ==
The prize money is unchanged from the European Tours of the last 3 years:

Stage (num. of players)		Prize money
Winner	(1)	£25,000
Runner-up	(1)	£10,000
Semi-finalists	(2)	£6,500
Quarter-finalists	(4)	£5,000
Third round losers	(8)	£3,000
Second round losers	(16)	£2,000*
First round losers	(16)	£1,000*
Total	£140,000	

- Seeded players who lose in the second round and host nation qualifiers (who qualify automatically as a result of their ranking) who lose in their first match of the event shall not be credited with prize money on any Order of Merit. A player who qualifies as a qualifier, but later becomes a seed due to the withdrawal of one or more other players shall be credited with their prize money on all Orders of Merit regardless of how far they progress in the event.

== Qualification and format ==
The top 16 entrants from the PDC ProTour Order of Merit on 16 March automatically qualified for the event and were seeded in the second round.

The remaining 32 places went to players from six qualifying events – 24 from the Tour Card Holder Qualifier (held on 18 March), two from the Associate Member Qualifier (held on 24 April), the two highest ProTour ranking Austrian players, two from the Host Nation Qualifier (held on 28 April), one from the Nordic & Baltic Associate Member Qualifier (held on 18 February), and one from the East European Associate Member Qualifier (held on 6 March).

Top seed Gerwyn Price and qualifier Adrian Lewis withdrew before the start of the tournament, so Ross Smith was promoted into the seeded positions and two extra places were made available in the Host Nation Qualifier.

The following players took part in the tournament:

Top 16

1. Peter Wright (second round)
2. José de Sousa (second round)
3. Joe Cullen (quarter-finals)
4. Michael van Gerwen (champion)
5. Ryan Searle (second round)
6. Dimitri Van den Bergh (second round)
7. Luke Humphries (second round)
8. Brendan Dolan (second round)
9. Rob Cross (quarter-finals)
10. Damon Heta (second round)
11. Jonny Clayton (third round)
12. Dirk van Duijvenbode (quarter-finals)
13. James Wade (third round)
14. Krzysztof Ratajski (third round)
15. Nathan Aspinall (semi-finals)
16. Ross Smith (second round)

Tour Card Qualifier
- Jermaine Wattimena (first round)
- Berry van Peer (first round)
- Matt Campbell (first round)
- Jeffrey de Zwaan (second round)
- Madars Razma (third round)
- Stephen Bunting (semi-finals)
- Steve Beaton (first round)
- Josh Rock (second round)
- Danny Jansen (third round)
- Devon Petersen (first round)
- Rowby-John Rodriguez (second round)
- Gabriel Clemens (third round)
- Brett Claydon (second round)
- Tony Martinez (first round)
- Radek Szagański (first round)
- Danny Noppert (runner-up)
- Cameron Menzies (second round)
- Callan Rydz (third round)
- Darius Labanauskas (first round)
- Jim Williams (second round)
- Ian White (first round)
- Ricky Evans (quarter-finals)

Associate Member Qualifier
- Wesley Plaisier (second round)
- Thibault Tricole (first round)

Highest Ranked Austrians
- Mensur Suljović (first round)
- Zoran Lerchbacher (third round)

Host Nation Qualifier
- Patrik Gosnak (second round)
- Michael Rasztovits (first round)
- Rainer Sturm (first round)
- Dietmar Burger (first round)

Nordic & Baltic Qualifier
- Johan Engström (first round)

East European Qualifier
- Karel Sedláček (first round)

== Draw ==
First round (best of 11 legs); 29 April
Dietmar Burger 93.82	0
Callan Rydz 98.02	6
Stephen Bunting 94.20	6
Karel Sedláček 95.40	5
Tony Martinez 77.28	1
Gabriel Clemens 84.80	6
Josh Rock 101.00	6
Devon Petersen 87.95	3
Steve Beaton 87.58	4
Cameron Menzies 93.28	6
Brett Claydon 75.19	6
Rainer Sturm 71.43	5
Thibault Tricole 95.10	5
Zoran Lerchbacher 97.96	6
Darius Labanauskas 81.61	3
Rowby-John Rodriguez 86.24	6
Madars Razma 108.65	6
Michael Rasztovits 85.30	0
Wesley Plaisier 96.12	6
Matt Campbell 91.39	3
Radek Szagański 84.80	1
Danny Jansen 100.96	6
Ricky Evans 100.10	6
Johan Engström 90.25	4
Jim Williams 86.16	6
Berry van Peer 76.82	1
Ian White 80.34	4
Patrik Gosnak 79.71	6
Danny Noppert 93.27	6
Jermaine Wattimena 88.20	5
Jeffrey de Zwaan 87.45	6
Mensur Suljović 85.37	5

Second round (best of 11 legs); 30 April
1	Peter Wright 100.63	3
Callan Rydz 96.15	6
16	Ross Smith 93.72	3
Stephen Bunting 92.38	6
8	Brendan Dolan 92.49	3
Gabriel Clemens 92.41	6
9	Rob Cross 100.17	6
Josh Rock 94.21	2
4	Michael van Gerwen 92.77	6
Cameron Menzies 94.90	3
13	James Wade 101.82	6
Brett Claydon 89.74	3
5	Ryan Searle 86.46	3
Zoran Lerchbacher 89.24	6
12	Dirk van Duijvenbode 91.95	6
Rowby-John Rodriguez 85.65	4
2	José de Sousa 86.38	3
Madars Razma 88.92	6
15	Nathan Aspinall 93.99	6
Wesley Plaisier 91.23	3
7	Luke Humphries 83.68	2
Danny Jansen 95.57	6
10	Damon Heta 90.28	3
Ricky Evans 91.82	6
3	Joe Cullen 97.93	6
Jim Williams 92.67	4
14	Krzysztof Ratajski 101.33	6
Patrik Gosnak 85.14	0
6	Dimitri Van den Bergh 99.65	3
Danny Noppert 103.10	6
11	Jonny Clayton 91.68	6
Jeffrey de Zwaan 89.27	4

Third round (best of 11 legs); 1 May
Rydz 83.86	4
Bunting 95.69	6
Clemens 88.64	5
9	Cross 92.51	6
4	van Gerwen 100.57	6
13	Wade 99.35	5
Lerchbacher 88.46	1
12	van Duijvenbode 100.70	6
Razma 87.97	2
15	Aspinall 91.94	6
Jansen 83.11	0
Evans 102.48	6
3	Cullen 101.72	6
14	Ratajski 93.61	2
Noppert 104.28	6
11	Clayton 101.02	2

Quarter-finals (best of 11 legs); 1 May
Bunting 89.39	6
9	Cross 88.31	4
4	van Gerwen 106.05	6
12	van Duijvenbode 103.38	1
15	Aspinall 92.87	6
Evans 91.84	5
3	Cullen 91.83	1
Noppert 95.64	6

Semi-finals (best of 13 legs); 1 May
Bunting 91.36	5
4	van Gerwen 92.46	7
15	Aspinall 81.12	2
Noppert 90.43	7

Final (best of 15 legs); 1 May
4	van Gerwen 98.78	8
Noppert 89.30	5
