= 2023 UK Open =

2023 Cazoo UK Open

Tournament information
- Dates: 3–5 March 2023
- Venue: Butlin's Minehead
- Location: Minehead, England
- Organisation(s): Professional Darts Corporation (PDC)
- Format: Legs; Final – best of 21
- Prize fund: £600,000
- Winner's share: £110,000
- High checkout: 170; Michael van Gerwen (x2); Adam Gawlas; Chris Dobey; Steve Beaton; Joe Cullen

Champion(s)
- Andrew Gilding (ENG)

The 2023 Cazoo UK Open was a darts tournament staged by the Professional Darts Corporation. It was the twenty-first year of the tournament where players compete in a single-elimination tournament to be crowned champion. The tournament was held at Butlin's Minehead, England, from 3 to 5 March 2023.

Danny Noppert was the defending champion after defeating Michael Smith 11–10 in the 2022 final to win his first major title, but he lost to William O'Connor 10–9 in the fifth round.

Andrew Gilding won his first major title, beating Michael van Gerwen 11–10 in a last leg decider when van Gerwen missed a dart at double 16 to win the match and the title. He became the oldest man to win a major TV title in his debut PDC final appearance.

== Prize money ==
The prize fund was increased from £450,000 to £600,000.

The tournament will now also pay down to the last 128 for the first time, with second-round losers to receive £1,000.

Stage (no. of players)		Prize money (Total: £600,000)
Winner	(1)	£110,000
Runner-up	(1)	£50,000
Semi-finalists	(2)	£30,000
Quarter-finalists	(4)	£15,000
Last 16 (sixth round)	(8)	£10,000
Last 32 (fifth round)	(16)	£5,000
Last 64 (fourth round)	(32)	£2,500
Last 96 (third round)	(32)	£1,500
Last 128 (second round)	(32)	£1,000
Last 160 (first round)	(30)	n/a

== Format ==
The 158 participants will enter the competition incrementally, with 62 players entering in the first round, with match winners joining the 32 players entering in the second and third rounds to leave the last 64 in the fourth round.

- No players are seeded.
- A random draw is held for each of the following rounds following the conclusion of the third round.
- All matches in the first, second and third rounds will be played over best of 11 legs.
- All matches in the fourth, fifth and sixth rounds and quarter-finals will be played over best of 19 legs.
- All matches in the semi-finals and final will be played over best of 21 legs.
- Eight boards will be used for matches in the first, second, third and fourth rounds.
- Four boards will be used for matches in the fifth round.
- Two boards will be used for matches in the sixth round.
- One board will be used for all the matches in the quarter-finals, semi-finals and final.

== Qualifiers ==
The 128 Tour Card holders will have a staggered entry based on their world ranking on 27 February 2023. They will be joined by the top eight non-qualified players from each of the 2022 Challenge & Development Tour Orders of Merit, and by the winners of 16 Amateur Qualification events organised through Riley's Sports Bars.

The field was confirmed on 27 February, with both Corey Cadby and Christian Perez not participating, meaning there were two byes to the second round. Also, Challenge Tour qualifier David Pallett turned down his invite, so Lukas Wenig, who was next on the list, took his place.

=== Number 1–32 on the PDC Order of Merit (receiving byes into fourth round) ===
1. (England) Michael Smith (fifth round)
2. (Scotland) Peter Wright (sixth round)
3. (Netherlands) Michael van Gerwen (runner-up)
4. (Wales) Gerwyn Price (fifth round)
5. (England) Luke Humphries (sixth round)
6. (England) Rob Cross (quarter-finals)
7. (Wales) Jonny Clayton (sixth round)
8. (Netherlands) Danny Noppert (fifth round)
9. (England) James Wade (fourth round)
10. (England) Nathan Aspinall (quarter-finals)
11. (Belgium) Dimitri Van den Bergh (semi-finals)
12. (Netherlands) Dirk van Duijvenbode (fourth round)
13. (England) Joe Cullen (sixth round)
14. (England) Ryan Searle (fourth round)
15. (Portugal) Jose de Sousa (fifth round)
16. (England) Dave Chisnall (fourth round)
17. (Australia) Damon Heta (fourth round)
18. (England) Ross Smith
19. (Germany) Gabriel Clemens (fourth round)
20. (Poland) Krzysztof Ratajski (fourth round)
21. (England) Chris Dobey (fifth round)
22. (England) Stephen Bunting (fourth round)
23. (Scotland) Gary Anderson (sixth round)
24. (England) Callan Rydz (fifth round)
25. (Northern Ireland) Brendan Dolan (sixth round)
26. (Northern Ireland) Daryl Gurney (fourth round)
27. (Germany) Martin Schindler (quarter-finals)
28. (Belgium) Kim Huybrechts (fifth round)
29. (England) Mervyn King (fifth round)
30. (Netherlands) Vincent van der Voort (fourth round)
31. (Netherlands) Raymond van Barneveld (fourth round)
32. (Scotland) Alan Soutar (fourth round)

=== Number 33–64 on the PDC Order of Merit (receiving byes into third round) ===
33. (Austria) Mensur Suljović
34. (Latvia) Madars Razma
35. (England) Adrian Lewis
36. (Northern Ireland) Josh Rock
37. (Australia) Simon Whitlock
38. (Republic of Ireland) William O'Connor
39. (England) Martin Lukeman
40. (Netherlands) Martijn Kleermaker
41. (England) Andrew Gilding (champion)
42. (Republic of Ireland) Keane Barry
43. (England) Ryan Joyce
44. (England) Ian White
45. (England) Ritchie Edhouse
46. (England) Ryan Meikle
47. (Netherlands) Jermaine Wattimena
48. (England) Luke Woodhouse
49. (England) Ricky Evans
50. (England) Jamie Hughes
51. (Germany) Florian Hempel
52. (England) Steve Beaton
53. (Austria) Rowby-John Rodriguez
54. (Belgium) Mike De Decker
55. (Croatia) Boris Krčmar
56. (Lithuania) Darius Labanauskas
57. (Wales) Jim Williams
58. (England) Scott Williams
59. (Wales) Lewy Williams
60. (Republic of Ireland) Steve Lennon
61. (South Africa) Devon Petersen
62. (Czech Republic) Adam Gawlas (semi-finals)
63. (England) Joe Murnan
64. (Canada) Jeff Smith

=== Number 65–96 on the PDC Order of Merit (receiving byes into second round) ===
65. (Canada) Matt Campbell
66. (Netherlands) Danny Jansen
67. (Scotland) Cameron Menzies
68. (Northern Ireland) Nathan Rafferty
69. (Northern Ireland) Mickey Mansell
70. (Republic of Ireland) John O'Shea
71. (England) Scott Waites
72. (Belgium) Mario Vandenbogaerde
73. (Netherlands) Kevin Doets
74. (England) Ted Evetts
75. (Netherlands) Jimmy Hendriks
76. (Germany) Ricardo Pietreczko
77. (Spain) José Justicia
78. (Wales) Richie Burnett
79. (Poland) Krzysztof Kciuk
80. (England) Connor Scutt
81. (Belgium) Brian Raman
82. (England) Bradley Brooks
83. (England) James Wilson
84. (Poland) Radek Szagański
85. (Austria) Rusty-Jake Rodriguez
86. (England) Shaun Wilkinson
87. (England) George Killington
88. (Netherlands) Luc Peters
89. (Spain) Tony Martinez
90. (Scotland) Ross Montgomery
91. (Netherlands) Damian Mol
92. (Scotland) Jamie Clark
93. (United States) Jules van Dongen
94. (Northern Ireland) Kevin Burness
95. (Netherlands) Richard Veenstra
96. (England) Keegan Brown

=== Number 97–128 on the PDC Order of Merit (starting in first round) ===
97. (England) Darren Webster (third round)
98. (England) Nick Fullwell (first round)
99. (Republic of Ireland) Dylan Slevin (fourth round)
100. (Netherlands) Niels Zonneveld (third round)
101. (Denmark) Vladimir Andersen (first round)
102. (Netherlands) Maik Kuivenhoven (first round)
103. (England) Arron Monk (second round)
104. (England) Graham Usher (third round)
105. (Netherlands) Jeffrey Sparidaans (first round)
106. (Netherlands) Gian van Veen (third round)
107. (England) Stephen Burton (second round)
108. (Belgium) Robbie Knops (third round)
109. (Netherlands) Jeffrey de Zwaan (sixth round)
110. (England) Josh Payne (first round)
111. (Netherlands) Geert Nentjes (second round)
112. (Germany) Pascal Rupprecht (first round)
113. (Wales) Robert Owen (first round)
114. (England) Adam Warner (second round)
115. (Wales) Nick Kenny (second round)
116. (Netherlands) Jurjen van der Velde (third round)
117. (Germany) Daniel Klose (second round)
118. (England) Graham Hall (second round)
119. (England) Adam Smith-Neale (first round)
120. (Belgium) Ronny Huybrechts (second round)
121. (Czech Republic) Karel Sedláček (fifth round)
122. (England) Lee Evans (first round)
123. (Netherlands) Owen Roelofs (third round)
124. (Netherlands) Danny van Trijp (first round)
125. ~~(Australia) Corey Cadby~~
126. (Wales) Callum Goffin (first round)
127. (France) Jacques Labre (first round)
128. ~~(Philippines) Christian Perez~~

=== PDC Development Tour qualifiers (starting in first round) ===
The top 8 ranked players from the 2022 Development Tour Order of Merit who didn't have a Tour Card for the 2023 season qualified for the first round.

1. (Scotland) Nathan Girvan (first round)
2. (Poland) Sebastian Białecki (first round)
3. (Republic of Ireland) Conor Heneghan (third round)
4. (England) Jarred Cole (first round)
5. (Netherlands) Jitse Van der Wal (second round)
6. (England) Joshua Richardson (first round)
7. (England) Christopher Holt (first round)
8. (England) Dom Taylor (first round)

=== PDC Challenge Tour qualifiers (starting in first round) ===
The top 8 ranked players from the 2022 Challenge Tour Order of Merit who didn't have a Tour Card for the 2023 season qualified for the first round.

1. (France) Thibault Tricole (first round)
2. ~~(England) David Pallett~~
3. (Netherlands) Christian Kist (first round)
4. (Belgium) Kenny Neyens (first round)
5. (Scotland) Jim McEwan (second round)
6. (England) Andy Jenkins (first round)
7. (Republic of Ireland) Michael Flynn (second round)
8. (Netherlands) Jelle Klaasen (third round)
9. (Germany) Lukas Wenig (first round)

=== Amateur qualifiers (starting in first round) ===
The winners of qualifiers organised by Rileys Sports Bars, held through January and February 2023, qualified for the first round. Entry to these tournaments was open to all players who had not qualified via another method, regardless of PDC Membership status.

- (England) Thomas Banks (Harlow) (fourth round)
- (England) Brett Claydon (Norwich) (first round)
- (England) Gary Davey (Liverpool) (second round)
- (England) Noel Grant (Coventry) (first round)
- (England) Lewis Gurney (Chester) (third round)
- (England) Harry Lane (Victoria, London) (first round)
- (United States) Danny Lauby (Coventry) (first round)
- (England) Daniel Lee (Solihull) (first round)
- (England) Luke Littler (Chorlton-cum-Hardy) (fourth round)
- (England) Callum Loose (Chorlton-cum-Hardy) (first round)
- (England) Jim Moston (Liverpool) (second round)
- (England) Darryl Pilgrim (Victoria, London) (first round)
- (England) Dan Read (South Benfleet) (third round)
- (England) James Richardson (Chester) (second round)
- (England) Stuart White (Victoria, London) (first round)
- (England) Jonathan Wynn (Norwich) (first round)

== Draw ==
=== Friday 3 March ===
==== First round (best of eleven legs) ====
Player	Score	Player	Player	Score	Player
Luke Littler (Q) 93.94	6–0	Nick Fullwell 75.16	Jelle Klaasen (CT) 92.62	6–2	Josh Payne 91.59
Gian van Veen 100.15	6–4	Robert Owen 84.60	James Richardson (Q) 93.24	6–4	Thibault Tricole (CT) 90.96
Lukas Wenig (CT) 88.62	3–6	Jeffrey de Zwaan 94.04	Sebastian Białecki (DT) 79.59	4–6	Joshua Richardson (DT) 82.70
Jurjen van der Velde 96.69	6–4	Brett Claydon (Q) 96.72	Geert Nentjes 95.48	6–5	Christian Kist (CT) 97.02
Arron Monk 84.72	6–5	Vladimir Andersen 81.37	Dan Read (Q) 84.53	6–5	Callum Loose (Q) 77.68
Conor Heneghan (DT) 93.12	6–2	Daniel Lee (Q) 89.43	Graham Hall 86.19	6–4	Jeffrey Sparidaans 79.30
Jacques Labre 89.90	3–6	Daniel Klose 87.70	Karel Sedláček 91.82	6–2	Harry Lane (Q) 88.19
Andy Jenkins (CT) 87.61	2–6	Adam Warner 91.62	Noel Grant (Q) 82.91	4–6	Graham Usher 89.83
Nathan Girvan (DT) 85.53	2–6	Niels Zonneveld 96.37	Michael Flynn (CT) 90.45	6–4	Jonathan Wynn (Q) 84.09
Callum Goffin 80.91	2–6	Robbie Knops 82.83	Pascal Rupprecht 93.16	5–6	Nick Kenny 86.97
Jarred Cole (DT) 80.56	5–6	Jitse van der Wal (DT) 83.21	Jim McEwan (CT) 92.87	6–1	Danny Lauby (Q) 88.97
Jim Moston (Q) 88.59	6–4	Kenny Neyens (CT) 81.94	Dylan Slevin 94.93	6–0	Maik Kuivenhoven 73.17
Gary Davey (Q) 94.47	6–4	Lee Evans 85.95	Danny van Trijp 92.59	3–6	Christopher Holt (DT) 82.64
Dom Taylor (DT) 90.48	4–6	Darren Webster 87.52	Lewis Gurney (Q) 91.04	6–5	Darryl Pilgrim (Q) 102.14
Stuart White (Q) 80.54	3–6	Owen Roelofs 87.44	Stephen Burton 83.71	6–5	Adam Smith-Neale 83.17
Ronny Huybrechts	bye		Thomas Banks (Q)	bye	

==== Second round (best of eleven legs) ====
Player	Score	Player	Player	Score	Player
Danny Jansen 84.75	6–4	Bradley Brooks 82.76	Connor Scutt 91.51	6–3	Jimmy Hendriks 94.38
James Richardson (Q) 81.98	2–6	Richie Burnett 92.09	Keegan Brown 92.48	3–6	Niels Zonneveld 98.42
Jules van Dongen 85.92	4–6	Kevin Doets 89.72	Rusty-Jake Rodriguez 88.03	2–6	Luke Littler (Q) 96.69
Matt Campbell 77.82	6–4	Christopher Holt 77.08	Daniel Klose 91.79	3–6	Mario Vandenbogaerde 96.18
José Justicia 99.04	4–6	Mickey Mansell 95.09	Cameron Menzies 99.08	6–2	Jim Moston (Q) 89.70
Ted Evetts 88.79	6–2	Jim McEwan 79.27	Lewis Gurney (Q) 85.47	6–5	Stephen Burton 86.91
Luc Peters 65.66	0–6	James Wilson 77.08	Damian Mol 83.98	6–4	Gary Davey (Q) 79.15
Dan Read (Q) 90.84	6–4	Brian Raman 92.46	Joshua Richardson 81.43	3–6	Owen Roelofs 91.79
Richard Veenstra 104.02	6–1	Jamie Clark 88.85	Darren Webster 92.51	6–5	Tony Martinez 89.49
Conor Heneghan 87.22	6–5	Nick Kenny 94.48	Graham Hall 83.31	3–6	Thomas Banks (Q) 85.34
Kevin Burness 91.85	2–6	Nathan Rafferty 93.34	Graham Usher 93.55	6–5	John O'Shea 83.95
Jeffrey de Zwaan 90.78	6–3	Geert Nentjes 90.45	Jelle Klaasen 94.54	6–1	Ricardo Pietreczko 76.89
Radek Szagański 86.92	6–3	Krzysztof Kciuk 84.61	Gian van Veen 100.67	6–5	Scott Waites 89.80
Jurjen van der Velde 91.65	6–4	Ronny Huybrechts 93.91	Michael Flynn 98.29	1–6	Karel Sedláček 107.56
Ross Montgomery 86.55	6–5	Adam Warner 80.59	Dylan Slevin 93.64	6–4	Shaun Wilkinson 84.18
Jitse van der Wal 69.51	1–6	George Killington 81.91	Arron Monk 87.77	0–6	Robbie Knops 94.93

==== Third round (best of eleven legs) ====
Player	Score	Player	Player	Score	Player
Adrian Lewis 96.97	6–0	Joe Murnan 87.10	Josh Rock 90.51	2–6	Luke Woodhouse 103.30
Ross Montgomery 90.71	3–6	Simon Whitlock 89.63	Florian Hempel 89.98	6–3	Jamie Hughes 89.70
Boris Krčmar 89.34	4–6	Jermaine Wattimena 89.92	Steve Beaton 88.00	6–4	Connor Scutt 88.03
Scott Williams 90.09	5–6	Jelle Klaasen 98.27	William O'Connor 99.91	6–2	Devon Petersen 90.34
Lewy Williams 85.29	1–6	Danny Jansen 96.31	Kevin Doets 90.19	6–3	Radek Szagański 84.24
Mario Vandenbogaerde 99.02	4–6	Adam Gawlas 97.65	Luke Littler (Q) 93.57	6–5	Ritchie Edhouse 90.38
Ryan Joyce 90.85	5–6	Mike De Decker 96.47	Cameron Menzies 94.24	2–6	Ian White 98.58
Jim Williams 102.36	6–3	Gian van Veen 101.68	Dylan Slevin 84.35	6–2	Robbie Knops 75.00
Martijn Kleermaker 93.02	6–4	Steve Lennon 91.10	Martin Lukeman 90.14	6–4	Dan Read (Q) 86.46
Madars Razma 90.05	5–6	George Killington 84.19	Richie Burnett 93.05	6–1	Jurjen van der Velde 66.44
Mensur Suljović 89.82	6–3	Mickey Mansell 79.10	Keane Barry 87.91	6–3	Damian Mol 84.08
Jeff Smith 90.39	1–6	Matt Campbell 92.44	Karel Sedláček 86.28	6–1	Lewis Gurney (Q) 82.74
Ryan Meikle 86.98	5–6	Nathan Rafferty 91.62	Andrew Gilding 94.75	6–2	Darren Webster 92.53
Niels Zonneveld 90.29	3–6	Darius Labanauskas 87.55	Ted Evetts 90.79	6–3	Owen Roelofs 87.28
Richard Veenstra 93.79	2–6	Rowby-John Rodriguez 92.42	Ricky Evans 89.61	6–5	Graham Usher 92.48
Jeffrey de Zwaan 87.30	6–4	James Wilson 86.81	Thomas Banks (Q) 81.35	6–2	Conor Heneghan 76.94

==== Fourth round (best of nineteen legs) ====
Player	Score	Player	Player	Score	Player
Darius Labanauskas 90.36	8 – 10	José de Sousa 91.36	Luke Woodhouse 102.83	10 – 2	Jelle Klaasen 93.32
George Killington 96.70	6 – 10	Martijn Kleermaker 93.72	Mensur Suljović 93.03	4 – 10	Karel Sedláček 93.69
Adam Gawlas 97.00	10 – 8	Luke Littler (Q) 100.20	James Wade 96.41	8 – 10	Gary Anderson 104.88
Matt Campbell 92.22	4 – 10	Adrian Lewis 102.61	Michael van Gerwen 98.14	10 – 8	Dave Chisnall 94.65
William O'Connor 97.20	10 – 1	Jermaine Wattimena 89.50	Gerwyn Price 103.40	10 – 3	Thomas Banks (Q) 90.75
Luke Humphries 95.34	10 – 9	Damon Heta 94.73	Krzysztof Ratajski 98.49	8 – 10	Dirk van Duijvenbode 92.93
Raymond van Barneveld 92.10	9 – 10	Rob Cross 99.23	Jeffrey de Zwaan 90.96	10 – 9	Danny Jansen 86.44
Mervyn King 90.41	10 – 7	Keane Barry 92.43	Nathan Rafferty 90.68	8 – 10	Ted Evetts 89.15
Martin Schindler 95.80	10 – 7	Simon Whitlock 92.53	Kim Huybrechts 86.55	10 – 8	Mike De Decker 87.15
Dylan Slevin 87.94	7 – 10	Joe Cullen 97.11	Danny Noppert 99.89	10 – 8	Jim Williams 99.85
Callan Rydz 99.01	10 – 7	Daryl Gurney 91.32	Dimitri Van den Bergh 99.75	10 – 5	Gabriel Clemens 97.38
Kevin Doets 91.89	10 – 9	Martin Lukeman 91.81	Richie Burnett 79.95	10 – 9	Florian Hempel 82.57
Rowby-John Rodriguez 80.34	4 – 10	Steve Beaton 87.79	Vincent van der Voort 94.85	9 – 10	Brendan Dolan 92.79
Michael Smith 101.19	10 – 4	Ian White 93.38	Stephen Bunting 92.92	9 – 10	Peter Wright 96.44
Alan Soutar 96.37	9 – 10	Nathan Aspinall 99.65	Ryan Searle 94.76	6 – 10	Chris Dobey 102.19
Ricky Evans 89.38	5 – 10	Andrew Gilding 99.68	Ross Smith 96.76	9 – 10	Jonny Clayton 94.79

=== Saturday 4 March ===
==== Fifth round (best of nineteen legs) ====
Player	Score	Player	Player	Score	Player
Michael Smith 96.37	9 – 10	Luke Humphries 99.66	Kim Huybrechts 86.87	2 – 10	Gary Anderson 93.54
William O'Connor 100.85	10 – 9	Danny Noppert 99.21	Richie Burnett 87.98	10 – 9	Ted Evetts 87.77
Gerwyn Price 101.49	8 – 10	Jeffrey de Zwaan 105.20	Peter Wright 92.03	10 – 8	Callan Rydz 93.11
Joe Cullen 95.35	10 – 5	Karel Sedláček 92.06	Chris Dobey 96.10	6 – 10	Brendan Dolan 94.83
Adrian Lewis 96.29	5 – 10	Martin Schindler 101.24	Jonny Clayton 96.60	10 – 3	José de Sousa 93.72
Steve Beaton 87.34	3 – 10	Rob Cross 101.54	Adam Gawlas 87.24	10 – 8	Kevin Doets 84.46
Dirk van Duijvenbode 98.04	8 – 10	Nathan Aspinall 95.32	Mervyn King 92.01	8 – 10	Dimitri Van den Bergh 95.24
Luke Woodhouse 91.89	5 – 10	Andrew Gilding 90.89	Martijn Kleermaker 90.91	6 – 10	Michael van Gerwen 98.15

==== Sixth round (best of nineteen legs) ====
Player	Score	Player	Player	Score	Player
Michael van Gerwen 103.98	10 – 4	Luke Humphries 97.05	Peter Wright 94.89	8 – 10	Richie Burnett 86.96
Jonny Clayton 94.47	8 – 10	Martin Schindler 94.42	Jeffrey de Zwaan 95.42	7 – 10	Rob Cross 95.76
Gary Anderson 99.23	8 – 10	Dimitri Van den Bergh 97.45	Brendan Dolan 87.49	8 – 10	Andrew Gilding 88.82
William O'Connor 96.65	3 – 10	Adam Gawlas 100.17	Nathan Aspinall 93.42	10 – 2	Joe Cullen 87.16

=== Sunday 5 March ===
==== Quarter-finals (best of nineteen legs) ====
Player	Score	Player
Andrew Gilding 93.90	10 – 4	Martin Schindler 87.87
Michael van Gerwen 99.62	10 – 6	Nathan Aspinall 98.16
Rob Cross 92.17	8 – 10	Adam Gawlas 96.54
Richie Burnett 83.85	2 – 10	Dimitri Van den Bergh 93.75

==== Semi-finals and Final ====
Semi-finals (best of 21 legs)
Adam Gawlas 85.90	6
Andrew Gilding 95.86	11
Dimitri Van den Bergh 89.63	6
Michael van Gerwen 94.47	11

Final (best of 21 legs)
Andrew Gilding 95.46	11
Michael van Gerwen 96.74	10
