= Tony Martinez (darts player) =

Belgian-Spanish darts player (born 1969)

Personal information
- Born: 11 December 1969 (age 56) Murcia, Spain
- Home town: Turnhout, Belgium

Sport
- Sport: Darts
- Playing since: 1983
- Darts: 23g MasterDarts
- Laterality: Right-handed
- Walk-on music: "Basket Case" by Green Day

Organisation (see split in darts)
- PDC: 2022–2023
- WDF: 2003–2017

WDF major events – best performances
- World Masters: Last 40: 2009
- Dutch Open: Last 512: 2024

PDC premier events – best performances
- UK Open: Last 128: 2023

Other tournament wins
- Years
Belgium Gold Cup	2003

Tony Martinez (born 11 December 1969) is a Belgian-Spanish professional darts player who has competed in Professional Darts Corporation (PDC) events.

At 2022 Q-School, Martinez won his PDC Tour Card by finishing fourth on the European Q-School Order of Merit, earning two years on the PDC Pro Tour.

== Performance timeline ==
=== BDO ===
Tournament	2003	2007	2009	2014	2015
World Masters	3R	3R	4R	2R	2R

=== PDC ===
Tournament	2022	2023
PDC Ranked televised events
UK Open	1R	2R
PDC Non-ranked televised events
World Cup	1R	RR
Career statistics
Season-end ranking	133	104

==== European Tour ====
Tournament	2017	2022	2023
German Grand Prix	2R	DNQ	1R
Austrian Open	DNQ	1R	DNQ

==== Players Championships ====
Season	1	2	3	4	5	6	7	8	9	10	11	12	13	14	15	16	17	18	19	20	21	22	23	24	25	26	27	28	29	30
2022	BAR; 1R	BAR; 1R	WIG; 2R	WIG; 1R	BAR; 3R	BAR; 1R	NIE; 1R	NIE; 1R	BAR; 1R	BAR; 1R	BAR; 2R	BAR; 1R	BAR; 3R	WIG; 1R	WIG; 1R	NIE; 2R	NIE; 1R	BAR; 1R	BAR; 2R	BAR; 3R	BAR; 1R	BAR; 2R	BAR; 1R	BAR; 1R	BAR; 3R	BAR; 2R	BAR; 1R	BAR; 1R	BAR; 2R	BAR; 1R
2023	BAR; 2R	BAR; 1R	BAR; 2R	BAR; 2R	BAR; 1R	BAR; 1R	HIL; 2R	HIL; 1R	WIG; 1R	WIG; 1R	LEI; 1R	LEI; 3R	HIL; 2R	HIL; 1R	LEI; 1R	LEI; 1R	HIL; 2R	HIL; 4R	BAR; 1R	BAR; 1R	BAR; 1R	BAR; 2R	BAR; 1R	BAR; 1R	BAR; 1R	BAR; 1R	BAR; 2R	BAR; 1R	BAR; 2R	BAR; 1R

Performance Table Legend
W	Won the tournament	F	Finalist	SF	Semifinalist	QF	Quarterfinalist	#R; RR; Prel.	Lost in # round Round-robin; Preliminary round	DQ	Disqualified
DNQ	Did not qualify	DNP	Did not participate	WD	Withdrew	NH	Tournament not held	#R; RR; Prel.	Lost in # round Round-robin; Preliminary round	NYF	Not yet founded
