= Ross Montgomery =

Scottish darts player (born 1962)

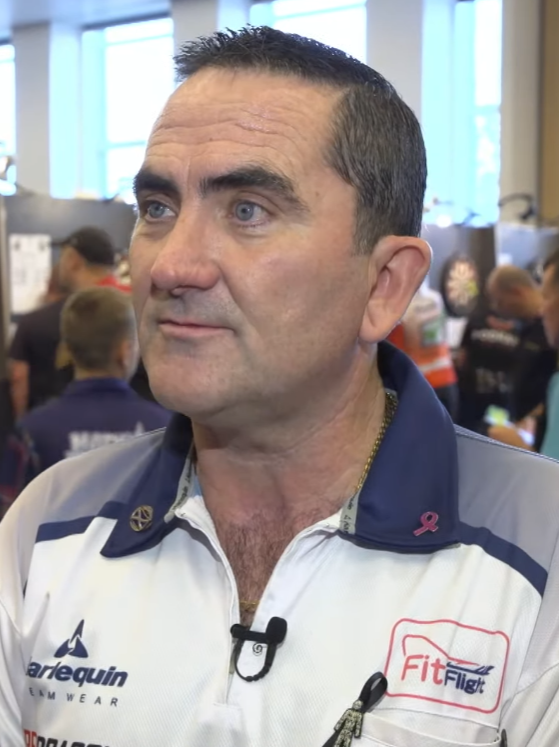
- Montgomery in 2021

Personal information
- Nickname: "The Boss"
- Born: 16 October 1962 (age 64) Greenhills, East Kilbride, Scotland

Sport
- Sport: Darts
- Playing since: 1992
- Darts: 24g Cosmo Custom
- Laterality: Right handed
- Walk-on music: "Thunderstruck" by AC/DC

Organisation (see split in darts)
- BDO: 2003–2020
- PDC: 2022–2024 (Tour Card 2022–2023)
- WDF: 2003–2021, 2025-
- Current world ranking: (WDF) 22 ▼2 (17 August 2026)

WDF major events – best performances
- World Championship: Quarter-final: 2015
- World Masters: Semi-final: 2011
- World Trophy: Runner-up: 2014
- Int. Darts League: Last 32 Group: 2007
- Finder Masters: Winner (1): 2010
- Dutch Open: Winner (2): 2014, 2020

PDC premier events – best performances
- UK Open: Last 96: 2022, 2023
- Grand Slam: Group Stage: 2017

WSDT major events – best performances
- World Championship: Winner (1): 2025
- Champions: Winner (1): 2025

Other tournament wins
- Years
BDO Gold Cup	2011
Belgium Open	2011, 2016
British Classic	2008, 2010
British Open	2017
Czech Open	2019
England Open	2008
Granite City Open	2010
Italian Grand Masters	2019
Jersey Classic	2016
Tops of Ghent	2013
Welsh Open	2009, 2011
Winmau Wolverhampton Open	2017
WDF World Cup Team	2013
World Seniors Target Open Series	2024 (x3)

Other achievements
- 2011 Dundee Open; 2010 Granite City Open; 2013 Scotland National Championships; 2010 WDF World Rankings Europe

Ross Montgomery
Medal record

Men's Darts

Representing Scotland

WDF World Cup
Gold medal – first place	2013 St John's	Men's Fours
Silver medal – second place	2013 St John's	Men's Team
Silver medal – second place	2015 Kemer	Men's Singles
Bronze medal – third place	2015 Kemer	Men's Doubles
Bronze medal – third place	2015 Kemer	Men's Team

WDF Europe Cup
Bronze medal – third place	2008 Copenhagen	Men's team
Bronze medal – third place	2008 Copenhagen	Men's team
Bronze medal – third place	2014 Bucharest	Men's Pairs
Bronze medal – third place	2018 Budapest	Men's team

Ross Montgomery (born 16 October 1962), nicknamed the Boss, is a Scottish professional darts player who competes in World Darts Federation (WDF) events. He is a World Seniors Darts (WSD) Champion, having won the 2025 World Seniors Championship. Montgomery also won the 2025 WSD Champion of Champions.

Montgomery won three British Darts Organisation (BDO) major titles: the 2010 Zuiderduin Masters, and the Dutch Open in both 2014 and 2020. He finished as runner-up at the 2014 BDO World Trophy. He also reached the semi-finals at the 2011 Winmau World Masters. He is a former BDO World Darts Championship quarter-finalist, having reached the last eight at the 2015 edition.

He has represented and captained Scotland at the WDF World Cup, winning the team event in 2013, as well as at the WDF Europe Cup, and Six Nations Cup.

== Darts career ==
Montgomery plays in the East Kilbride & District Darts League and in the Glasgow Premier League. He is a multiple time Rutherglen / East Kilbride singles champion.

As of 2014, Montgomery has represented Scotland at four WDF World Cups, four WDF Europe Cups and six BDO Six Nations Cups. He has played in thirty-six matches for Scotland, winning twenty-four of them.

Montgomery qualified for the 2006 BDO World Championships along with players like Brian Woods and eventual champion Jelle Klaasen of the Netherlands. Montgomery was drawn in the first round with another Dutchman Vincent van der Voort, losing 3–1 in sets.

He followed this, however, by reaching the final of the Scottish Open, beating Gary Robson and Michael van Gerwen before losing in the final to Sweden's Göran Klemme, runner-up in the 2005 World Masters. He played in the 2007 International Darts League, beating PDC player Chris Mason, Belgium's Dirk Hespeels and avenged his Lakeside defeat by van der Voort to win Group 4 with a 100% record. He wasn't able to repeat his performances in the Last 32 Group stage, losing all 3 of his games in Group D to Martin Atkins, Scott Waites and group winner Raymond van Barneveld. Montgomery produced a good run in the Winmau World Masters, reaching the last 16 of the tournament, losing to Atkins.

In 2008, Montgomery won the newly created EDO England Open, which was run by the newly formed English Darts Organisation. He scored wins over Johnny Nijs, Ted Hankey, Gary Robson and Edwin Max before beating another Scotsman Gary Anderson in the final. He then reached the final of the inaugural BDO International Open, an event formerly known as the BDO England Open, losing to Davy Richardson. On 26 July 2008 Montgomery won his second event of the year, winning the British Classic, again beating Anderson in the final. Montgomery regained the British Classic crown in 2010, defeating Stuart Kellett in the final. Montgomery ended 2008 ranked seventh on the year end WDF World rankings.

These performances helped Montgomery earn automatic qualification for the 2009 BDO World Championships as the number 10 seed. He defeated Welshman Martin Phillips in the first round but lost in round two to eventual champion Ted Hankey. He entered the tournament the following year as the Number 6 seed, but wasted six darts to win his first round match and lost to Garry Thompson.

Montgomery won the 2010 British Classic as well as the 2010 Zuiderduin Masters, his inaugural major title, where he came from 4–0 down in sets to win 5–4 against Robbie Green, also surviving three match darts. Montgomery finished as the year end number one in WDF Working Rankings Europe for 2010. At the 2011 BDO World Darts Championship, Montgomery was beaten 3–1 in sets by Alan Norris.

Montgomery reached the semi-finals of the 2011 Winmau World Masters where he was beaten in a deciding leg by Dean Winstanley. Following his victory at 2010 edition, Montgomery had another decent run reaching the semi-finals of the Zuiderduin Masters in 2011. At the 2012 BDO World Darts Championship, Montgomery reached the second round for only the second time courtesy of a 3–1 win over Fabian Roosenbrand in the first round, but was subsequently defeated 4–1 by eventual runner-up Tony O'Shea.

Montgomery was defeated in the first round of the 2013 BDO World Darts Championship 3–1 by Paul Jennings, having had four darts to lead 2–1. Montgomery captained Scotland to silver behind England in the overall team competition at the 2013 WDF World Cup, while alongside team-mates Gary Stone, Craig Baxter and Alan Soutar, Scotland defeated America 9–7 in the men's team final. Montgomery again reached the semi-finals of the Zuiderduin Masters, losing to eventual champion James Wilson.

He followed this with a narrow 3–2 first round win at the 2014 World Championship over qualifier Michael Meaney, after Meaney missed seven darts to take a 2–0 lead in the deciding set. He was beaten in the second round by Martin Adams. Montgomery showed good form to lift the Dutch Open with victory over Scott Waites and then reach the final of the newly reinstated BDO World Trophy, where he was defeated 13–11 by James Wilson.

At the 2015 World Championship, Monty defeated Pip Blackwell 3–1 in the first round, before dispatching Scott Waites 4–0 in the second to reach the quarter-finals at Lakeside for the first time in his career. He was then beaten 5–1 in the quarter-finals by Martin Adams.

After a quiet year on the circuit, Montgomery still managed to qualify for the 2016 World Championship but was unseeded for the first time in 10 years, He lost in the first round to Jamie Hughes 3–0.

=== PDC ===
Montgomery's first appearance in the PDC was when he qualified for the 2017 Grand Slam of Darts, as one of the top five non-qualified players from the BDO invitational rankings. He was drawn in Group A with defending champion, Michael van Gerwen, European Championship runner-up, Rob Cross and Tour Card qualifier, Joe Murnan. He started off with a 5–1 loss to Van Gerwen, before bouncing back to win his next match against Joe Murnan, 5–3. This win gave Montgomery a chance to advance to the round of 16, if he could beat Rob Cross in their last match. Unfortunately, he lost with a score of 5–2.

He announced on 6 January his intention to participate in the 2022 PDC Q School, where he successfully secured a PDC Tour Card.

Montgomery would lose his Tour Card in November 2023, following the conclusion of the PDC Tour Card Holder Qualifiers for the 2024 PDC World Darts Championship.

=== WSD ===
Montgomery was given an invitation to compete at the 2025 World Seniors Darts Championship. He kicked off with a whitewash win over former BDO Women's World Champion, Trina Gulliver, before surviving a narrow second round match with John Part, winning 3–2. He later recorded 3–1 wins over Robert Thornton and Steve Beaton, before beating Graham Usher in the final 5–1, to claim the championship. He repeated this strong form at the 2025 World Seniors Champion of Champions, with wins over Trina Gulliver, Raymond van Barneveld, before defeating defending champion, Richie Howson 8–5.

Montgomery was due to face either Neil Duff or Richie Burnett, after their first round clash in the 2025 World Seniors Matchplay in November. However, it was announced in August, that the tournament was cancelled, after the WSD collapsed.

== Personal life ==
While Montgomery played American football for the Glasgow Diamonds he met his wife Dorothy, who was a cheerleader for the team at the time. He and his wife Dorothy have a son Scott (born 1993) and daughters Alisha (born 1998) and Gemma (born 2000).

Montgomery is a supporter of football club Rangers F.C..

== World Championship results ==
=== BDO ===
- 2006: First round (lost to Vincent van der Voort 1–3)
- 2009: Second round (lost to Ted Hankey 1–4)
- 2010: First round (lost to Garry Thompson 2–3)
- 2011: First round (lost to Alan Norris 1–3)
- 2012: Second round (lost to Tony O'Shea 1–4)
- 2013: First round (lost to Paul Jennings 1–3)
- 2014: Second round (lost to Martin Adams 1–4)
- 2015: Quarter-finals (lost to Martin Adams 1–5)
- 2016: First round (lost to Jamie Hughes 0–3)
- 2017: First round (lost to Richard Veenstra 1–3)
- 2018: First round (lost to Scott Waites 1–3)
- 2019: First round (lost to Scott Baker 0–3)
- 2020: Preliminary round (lost to Thibault Tricole 2–3)

== Career finals ==
=== BDO major finals: 2 (1 title) ===
Legend
BDO World Trophy (0–1)
Zuiderduin Masters (1–0)

Outcome	No.	Year	Championship	Opponent in the final	Score (Note: (l) = score in legs, (s) = score in sets.)
Winner	1.	2010	Zuiderduin Masters	(England) Robbie Green	5–4 (s)
Runner-up	2.	2014	BDO World Trophy	(England) James Wilson	11–13 (l)

=== WDF major finals (1 runner-up) ===
Outcome	No.	Year	Championship	Opponent in the final	Score (Note: (l) = score in legs, (s) = score in sets.)
Runner-up	1.	2015	WDF World Cup	(Wales) Jim Williams	4–7 (l)

== Performance timeline ==
=== BDO ===
Tournament	2003	2004	2005	2006	2007	2008	2009	2010	2011	2012	2013	2014	2015	2016	2017	2018	2019	2020
BDO Ranked televised events
World Championship	DNQ			1R	DNQ		2R	1R	1R	2R	1R	2R	QF	1R	1R	1R	1R	Prel.
World Trophy	Not held											F	1R	1R	QF	SF	1R	NH
World Masters	2R	3R	1R	DNP	6R	QF	6R	6R	SF	6R	6R	5R	5R	2R	6R	5R	DNP	NH
Finder Masters	DNP			NH	DNP	RR	QF	W	SF	SF	SF	RR	RR	RR	RR	RR	NH	
International Darts League	DNP				RR	Not held												

=== PDC ===
Tournament	2017	2022	2023
PDC Ranked televised events
UK Open	BDO	3R	3R
Grand Slam	RR	DNQ	
Season-end ranking (PDC)	NR	139	102

==== European Tour ====
Tournament	2022	2023
European Matchplay	1R	DNQ
European Grand Prix	DNQ	3R

==== Players Championships ====
Season	1	2	3	4	5	6	7	8	9	10	11	12	13	14	15	16	17	18	19	20	21	22	23	24	25	26	27	28	29	30
2022	BAR; 2R	BAR; 3R	WIG; 1R	WIG; 1R	BAR; 1R	BAR; 2R	NIE; 1R	NIE; 1R	BAR; 1R	BAR; 1R	BAR; 1R	BAR; 1R	BAR; 1R	WIG; 1R	WIG; 2R	NIE; 2R	NIE; 1R	BAR; 1R	BAR; 1R	BAR; 2R	BAR; 1R	BAR; 2R	BAR; 3R	BAR; 1R	BAR; 2R	BAR; 1R	BAR; 1R	BAR; 1R	BAR; 1R	BAR; 1R
2023	BAR; 3R	BAR; 1R	BAR; 2R	BAR; 2R	BAR; 1R	BAR; 1R	HIL; 4R	HIL; 2R	WIG; 1R	WIG; 2R	LEI; 1R	LEI; 2R	HIL; 1R	HIL; 1R	LEI; 1R	LEI; 1R	HIL; 1R	HIL; 1R	BAR; 1R	BAR; 1R	BAR; 2R	BAR; 1R	BAR; 1R	BAR; 1R	BAR; 1R	BAR; 2R	BAR; 1R	BAR; 2R	BAR; 1R	BAR; 2R

Performance Table Legend
W	Won the tournament	F	Finalist	SF	Semifinalist	QF	Quarterfinalist	#R; RR; L#	Lost in # round Round-robin; Last # stage	DQ	Disqualified
DNQ	Did not qualify	DNP	Did not participate	WD	Withdrew	NH	Tournament not held	#R; RR; L#	Lost in # round Round-robin; Last # stage	NYF	Not yet founded
