= Graham Hall =

Graham Hall might refer to:

- Graham Hall (musician), British musician
- Billy Graham Hall, building at Wheaton College
- Graham Family Hall, building at University of Notre Dame

== See also ==
- Graeme Hall
