= Graham Usher (darts player) =

English darts player (born 1973)

Personal information
- Nickname: "The Gambler"
- Born: 14 June 1973 (age 53) Middlesbrough, North Yorkshire, England
- Home town: Scarborough, North Yorkshire, England

Sport
- Sport: Darts
- Playing since: 2008
- Darts: 21g Perfect Nine
- Laterality: Left-handed
- Walk-on music: "Livin' on a Prayer" by Bon Jovi

Organisation (see split in darts)
- PDC: 2009–present (Tour Card 2023–2024)
- WDF: 2019; 2026
- Current world ranking: (PDC) NR (18 October 2026)

WDF major events – best performances
- World Masters: Quarter-final: 2019

PDC premier events – best performances
- UK Open: Last 32: 2024
- World Series Finals: Last 24: 2023

WSDT major events – best performances
- World Championship: Runner-up: 2025

Other tournament wins
- Tournament: Years
- British Open: 2026

Graham Usher (born 14 June 1973) is an English professional darts player who competes in both Professional Darts Corporation (PDC) and World Darts Federation (WDF) events and formerly participated in British Darts Organisation (BDO) and World Seniors (WSD) events. He finished as the runner-up at the 2025 World Seniors Championship. Usher reached his only BDO major quarter-final at the 2019 World Masters. He was a PDC Tour Card holder from 2023 to 2024, having won his card at 2023 Q-School. His best PDC major performance is reaching the last 32 at the 2024 UK Open. He also qualified for the 2023 World Series Finals.

== Career ==
In 2009, Usher qualified for the 2009 UK Open as the Holsten Pils qualifier in Batley; he lost Glen Durrant 6–3 in the first round.

Usher participated in the 2019 World Masters, where he reached the quarter-finals but lost there to Mario Vandenbogaerde 4–2 in sets.

In 2020, 2021 and 2022 consequently, he took his part in PDC Q-School three times, but failed to get a Tour Card. In these years he played on the Challenge Tour. On the 2022 Challenge Tour he reached the semi-finals at Challenge Tour 11 and Challenge Tour 18, losing to Jelle Klaasen 5–4 and Patrick Peters 5–3 respectively.

In 2022 he played in the MODUS Super Series, where he hit a nine-dart leg in July in a match against Dan Read. He was defeated by Conan Whitehead in the October 2022 MODUS Super Series.

Usher qualified for a PDC Tour Card for the first time at the 2023 Q-School, defeating Adam Warner on the second finals day. Usher reached the fifth round of the 2024 UK Open, which won him his biggest haul at a single event with £5,000 in ranking money, but did not earn enough ranking money during his two years on the Pro Tour to reach the Top 64 and keep his Tour Card, falling short with £32,250 in ranking money. Usher attended Q-School again in 2025, but failed to re-gain his Tour Card.

== World Championship results ==
=== WSD ===
- 2025: Runner up: (lost to Ross Montgomery 1–5) (sets)

== Performance timeline ==
=== BDO ===
| Tournament | 2019 |
|---|---|
BDO Ranked televised events
| World Masters | QF |

=== PDC ===
| Tournament | 2009 | 2023 | 2024 | 2025 |
|---|---|---|---|---|
PDC Ranked televised events
| UK Open | 1R | 3R | 5R | 3R |
PDC Non-ranked televised events
| World Series Finals | NH | 1R | DNQ | |
Career statistics
| Season-end ranking | - | 122 | 87 | 203 |

==== European Tour ====
| Tournament | 2023 |
|---|---|
| Baltic Sea Open | 2R |
| Belgian Open | 1R |
| European Grand Prix | 1R |

==== Players Championships ====
| Season | 1 | 2 | 3 | 4 | 5 | 6 | 7 | 8 | 9 | 10 | 11 | 12 | 13 | 14 | 15 | 16 | 17 | 18 | 19 | 20 | 21 | 22 | 23 | 24 | 25 | 26 | 27 | 28 | 29 | 30 |
|---|---|---|---|---|---|---|---|---|---|---|---|---|---|---|---|---|---|---|---|---|---|---|---|---|---|---|---|---|---|---|
| 2023 | BAR; 1R | BAR; 2R | BAR; 1R | BAR; 1R | BAR; 1R | BAR; 4R | HIL; 2R | HIL; 1R | WIG; 1R | WIG; 1R | LEI; 3R | LEI; 1R | HIL; DNP | | LEI; 1R | LEI; 2R | HIL; 1R | HIL; 1R | BAR; 1R | BAR; 2R | BAR; 2R | BAR; 1R | BAR; 1R | BAR; 2R | BAR; 2R | BAR; 1R | BAR; 1R | BAR; 1R | BAR; 1R | BAR; 2R |
| 2024 | WIG; 3R | WIG; 1R | LEI; 1R | LEI; 1R | HIL; 1R | HIL; 2R | LEI; 1R | LEI; 1R | HIL; DNP | | HIL; 1R | HIL; 1R | MIL; 1R | MIL; QF | MIL; 1R | MIL; 2R | MIL; 1R | MIL; 1R | MIL; 1R | WIG; 1R | WIG; 1R | LEI; 2R | LEI; 1R | WIG; 3R | WIG; 2R | WIG; 1R | WIG; 1R | WIG; 1R | LEI; 1R | LEI; 2R |

Key

Performance Table Legend
| W | Won the tournament | F | Finalist | SF | Semifinalist | QF | Quarterfinalist | #R; RR; Prel. | Lost in # round Round-robin; Preliminary round | DQ | Disqualified |
| DNQ | Did not qualify | DNP | Did not participate | WD | Withdrew | NH | Tournament not held | #R; RR; Prel. | Lost in # round Round-robin; Preliminary round | NYF | Not yet founded |
