= 2016 PDC European Tour =

Series of darts tournaments

The 2016 PDC European Tour was a series of non-televised darts tournaments organised by the Professional Darts Corporation (PDC). Players Championships, UK Open Qualifiers and European Tour events are the events that make up the PDC Pro Tour. This year there are 10 European Tour events being held – 7 in Germany and one each in Austria, Gibraltar and the Netherlands.

== Prize money ==
Prize money for European Tour events stays the same as in 2015. This is how the prize money is divided:

Stage (num. of players)		Prize money
Winner	(1)	£25,000
Runner-up	(1)	£10,000
Semi-finalists	(2)	£5,000
Quarter-finalists	(4)	£3,500
Third round losers	(8)	£2,000
Second round losers	(16)	£1,500
First round losers	(16)	£1,000
Total	£115,000	

== European Tour events ==
Compared to last year, there's one European Tour event added on the calendar. In addition, the top 32 of the European Tour will qualify for the European Championship.

No.	Date	Venue	Location	Winner	Legs	Runner-up	Ref.
1	12–14 February	Dutch Darts Masters	(Netherlands) Venray, Evenementenhal	Michael van Gerwen (Netherlands)	6–2	(Northern Ireland) Daryl Gurney	
2	26–28 March	German Darts Masters	(Germany) Munich, Ballhausforum	Michael van Gerwen (Netherlands)	6–4	(Scotland) Peter Wright	
3	6–8 May	Gibraltar Darts Trophy	Gibraltar, Victoria Stadium	Michael van Gerwen (Netherlands)	6–2	(England) Dave Chisnall	
4	13–15 May	European Darts Matchplay	(Germany) Hamburg, Alsterdorfer Sporthalle	James Wade (England)	6–5	(England) Dave Chisnall	
5	10–12 June	Austrian Darts Open	(Austria) Vienna, Multiversum Schwechat	Phil Taylor (England)	6–4	(England) Michael Smith	
6	29–31 July	European Darts Open	(Germany) Düsseldorf, Maritim Hotel	Michael van Gerwen (Netherlands)	6–5	(Scotland) Peter Wright	
7	2–4 September	International Darts Open	(Germany) Riesa, Sachsen Arena	Mensur Suljović (Austria)	6–5	(Belgium) Kim Huybrechts	
8	9–11 September	European Darts Trophy	(Germany) Mülheim, RWE Sporthalle	Michael van Gerwen (Netherlands)	6–5	(Austria) Mensur Suljović	
9	16–18 September	European Darts Grand Prix	(Germany) Sindelfingen, Glaspalast	Michael van Gerwen (Netherlands)	6–2	(Scotland) Peter Wright	
10	14–16 October	German Darts Championship	(Germany) Hildesheim, Halle 39	Alan Norris (England)	6−5	(Netherlands) Jelle Klaasen	

== European Tour Qualifiers ==
=== UK Qualifiers ===
Dutch Darts Masters
- (England) Mervyn King
- (Australia) Simon Whitlock
- (England) Stephen Bunting
- (England) Ronnie Baxter
- (Wales) Gerwyn Price
- (Wales) Jamie Lewis
- (Wales) Kevin Thomas
- (Scotland) John Henderson
- (Northern Ireland) Daryl Gurney
- (Wales) Mark Webster
- (England) James Richardson
- (England) Jamie Caven
- (England) Paul Milford
- (England) Ricky Evans
- (England) David Pallett
- (England) Ritchie Edhouse
- (England) Robbie Green
- (England) Kevin Painter
- (South Africa) Devon Petersen
- (England) Ryan Harrington

German Darts Masters
- (Scotland) Mark Barilli
- (England) Mark Walsh
- (England) Stephen Bunting
- (England) Alan Norris
- (England) Chris Dobey
- (England) Ben Davies
- (England) James Richardson
- (England) John Bowles
- (Northern Ireland) Daryl Gurney
- (England) Nathan Aspinall
- (England) Steve Beaton
- (England) Darren Johnson
- (England) Stuart Kellett
- (England) Andrew Gilding
- (England) Peter Hudson
- (England) Joe Cullen
- (Republic of Ireland) William O'Connor
- (England) Kevin Painter
- (South Africa) Devon Petersen
- (England) James Wilson

Gibraltar Darts Trophy
- (England) Ross Smith
- (England) Nick Fullwell
- (England) Justin Pipe
- (England) Stephen Bunting
- (Wales) Gerwyn Price
- (Northern Ireland) Daryl Gurney
- (England) Alan Norris
- (Wales) Jamie Lewis
- (Scotland) John Henderson
- (England) Andy Hamilton
- (England) Steve Beaton
- (England) Mark Walsh
- (England) Steve West
- (England) Joe Murnan
- (England) David Pallett
- (England) Wayne Jones
- (Australia) Kyle Anderson
- (England) Kevin Painter
- (England) Joe Cullen
- (England) Stuart Kellett

European Darts Matchplay
- (England) ~~Phil Taylor~~ (withdrew)
- (England) Richie Corner
- (England) Darren Webster
- (England) Josh Payne
- (England) Jamie Robinson
- (Northern Ireland) Daryl Gurney
- (England) Alan Norris
- (England) Ricky Williams
- (Scotland) John Henderson
- (Wales) Mark Webster
- (Wales) Jonny Clayton
- (Wales) Jonathan Worsley
- (England) Jamie Caven
- (England) Joe Murnan
- (England) Chris Dobey
- (England) Andrew Gilding
- (England) Darren Johnson
- (England) Kevin Painter
- (England) Joe Cullen
- (South Africa) Devon Petersen

Austrian Darts Open
- (England) Steve West
- (England) Mervyn King
- (England) Justin Pipe
- (Northern Ireland) Brendan Dolan
- (England) Chris Dobey
- (England) Wayne Jones
- (England) Josh Payne
- (England) Steve Beaton
- (England) James Richardson
- (Wales) Jonny Clayton
- (Australia) Kyle Anderson
- (England) Jamie Caven
- (England) Nigel Heydon
- (England) Steve McNally
- (England) Darron Brown
- (England) Mark Frost
- (England) Wes Newton
- (England) Simon Stevenson
- (England) James Wilson
- (England) Ross Smith

European Darts Open
- (England) Alan Norris
- (Wales) Gerwyn Price
- (England) Daryl Gurney
- (England) Shaun Griffiths
- (England) James Richardson
- (England) Andy Jenkins
- (England) Mark Frost
- (England) Harry Ward
- (Wales) Jonny Clayton
- (England) Ritchie Edhouse
- (England) Tony Newell
- (England) Steve West
- (Australia) Kyle Anderson
- (England) Jamie Caven
- (England) Robbie Green
- (England) Andy Boulton
- (Scotland) John Henderson
- (England) Wes Newton
- (England) Andy Hamilton
- (South Africa) Devon Petersen

International Darts Open
- (Northern Ireland) Daryl Gurney
- (England) James Wilson
- (England) Joe Cullen
- (Scotland) Jim Walker
- (England) Andy Hamilton
- (England) Michael Barnard
- (England) James Richardson
- (England) Jamie Caven
- (Australia) Kyle Anderson
- (Northern Ireland) Brendan Dolan
- (England) Andy Boulton
- (England) Kevin Painter
- (England) Robbie Green
- (England) Ryan Meikle
- (England) Mark Frost
- (England) Ricky Evans
- (South Africa) Devon Petersen
- (England) Chris Dobey
- (England) Darren Webster
- (England) Steve West

European Darts Trophy
- (Northern Ireland) Daryl Gurney
- (England) Mervyn King
- (England) Joe Cullen
- (England) Justin Pipe
- (England) Joe Murnan
- (England) Ritchie Edhouse
- (England) Josh Payne
- (England) Jamie Caven
- (Australia) Kyle Anderson
- (England) Keegan Brown
- (England) Simon Stevenson
- (England) Andy Jenkins
- (England) Robbie Green
- (Wales) Jamie Lewis
- (England) Matthew Dennant
- (England) Ricky Evans
- (South Africa) Devon Petersen
- (England) Andy Smith
- (England) Darren Webster
- (England) Steve West

European Darts Grand Prix
- (Northern Ireland) Daryl Gurney
- (England) Arron Monk
- (England) Steve Beaton
- (England) Andy Boulton
- (Wales) Jonny Clayton
- (England) Scott Dale
- (England) Nathan Aspinall
- (England) James Wilson
- (Republic of Ireland) Mick McGowan
- (England) Robbie Green
- (Northern Ireland) Brendan Dolan
- (Wales) Robert Owen
- (England) James Hubbard
- (England) Jay Foreman
- (England) Mark Frost
- (England) Scott Taylor
- (England) Alan Tabern
- (England) Joe Murnan
- (South Africa) Devon Petersen
- (England) Darren Webster

German Darts Ch'ship
- (England) Mervyn King
- (Northern Ireland) Michael Mansell
- (England) Mark Walsh
- (England) Justin Pipe
- (England) Andy Boulton
- (Wales) Mark Webster
- (Australia) Kyle Anderson
- (England) Andy Smith
- (England) Robbie Green
- (England) Brendan Dolan
- (England) Kevin Painter
- (England) Eddie Dootson
- (England) Darren Johnson
- (England) Ted Evetts
- (England) Steve West
- (England) Chris Dobey
- (England) Scott Taylor
- (England) David Pallett
- (England) Peter Hudson
- (England) Steve Hine

=== European Qualifiers ===
Dutch Darts Masters
- (Austria) Zoran Lerchbacher
- (Germany) Jyhan Artut
- (Greece) John Michael
- (Belgium) Mike De Decker
- (Germany) Andree Welge
- (Germany) Martin Schindler
- (Belgium) Dimitri van den Bergh
- (Austria) Rowby-John Rodriguez

German Darts Masters
- (Spain) Cristo Reyes
- (Switzerland) Thomas Junghans
- (Belgium) Dimitri van den Bergh
- (Netherlands) Mike Zuydwijk
- (Greece) John Michael
- (Netherlands) Jeffrey de Graaf
- (Belgium) Ronny Huybrechts
- (Netherlands) Jermaine Wattimena

Gibraltar Darts Trophy
- (Germany) Max Hopp
- (Netherlands) Jermaine Wattimena
- (Austria) Rowby-John Rodriguez
- (Austria) Michael Rasztovits
- (Spain) Cristo Reyes
- (Netherlands) Dirk van Duijvenbode
- (Netherlands) Christian Kist
- (Spain) Antonio Alcinas

European Darts Matchplay
- (Netherlands) Michel van der Horst
- (Belgium) Mike De Decker
- (Netherlands) Vincent van der Voort
- (Netherlands) Ron Meulenkamp
- (Sweden) Magnus Caris
- (Austria) Rowby-John Rodriguez
- (Spain) Cristo Reyes
- (Netherlands) Remco van Eijden

Austrian Darts Open
- (Netherlands) Ron Meulenkamp
- (Netherlands) Jermaine Wattimena
- (Netherlands) Jeffrey de Graaf
- (Netherlands) Vincent van der Voort
- (Netherlands) Mike Zuydwijk
- (Belgium) Dimitri van den Bergh
- (Netherlands) Christian Kist
- (Netherlands) Jeffrey de Zwaan

European Darts Open
- (Greece) John Michael
- (Spain) Cristo Reyes
- (Netherlands) Christian Kist
- (Netherlands) Jeffrey de Graaf
- (Finland) Kim Viljanen
- (Netherlands) Jan Dekker
- (Italy) Daniele Petri
- (Belgium) Dimitri van den Bergh

International Darts Open
- (Belgium) Ronny Huybrechts
- (Netherlands) Jeffrey de Graaf
- (Netherlands) Jeffrey de Zwaan
- (Netherlands) Jermaine Wattimena
- (Poland) Krzysztof Ratajski
- (Austria) Michael Rasztovits
- (Netherlands) Vincent Kamphuis
- (Netherlands) Yordi Meeuwisse

European Darts Trophy
- (Belgium) Dimitri Van den Bergh
- (Spain) Cristo Reyes
- (Hungary) Janos Végsö
- (Austria) Zoran Lerchbacher
- (Netherlands) Jermaine Wattimena
- (Netherlands) Vincent Kamphuis
- (Belgium) Ronny Huybrechts
- (Netherlands) Vincent van der Voort

European Darts Grand Prix
- (Netherlands) Raymond van Barneveld
- (Spain) Cristo Reyes
- (Netherlands) Christian Kist
- (Belgium) Ronny Huybrechts
- (Netherlands) Jermaine Wattimena
- (Netherlands) Jeffrey de Graaf
- (Croatia) Robert Marijanović
- (England) Tony West

German Darts Ch'ship
- (Netherlands) Vincent van der Voort
- (Spain) Cristo Reyes
- (Netherlands) Christian Kist
- (Austria) Rowby-John Rodriguez
- (Netherlands) Ron Meulenkamp
- (Netherlands) Yordi Meeuwisse
- (England) Tony West
- (Hungary) Janos Végsö

=== Host Nation Qualifiers ===
Dutch Darts Masters
- (Netherlands) Dirk van Duijvenbode
- (Netherlands) Remco van Eijden
- (Netherlands) Jermaine Wattimena
- (Netherlands) Jan Dekker

German Darts Masters
- (Germany) Tomas Seyler
- (Germany) René Eidams
- (Germany) Fabian Herz
- (Germany) Marko Puls

Gibraltar Darts Trophy
- (Gibraltar) David Francis
- (Gibraltar) George Federico
- (Gibraltar) Dyson Parody
- (Gibraltar) Antony Lopez

European Darts Matchplay
- (Germany) Max Hopp
- (Germany) Andree Welge
- (Germany) René Eidams
- (Germany) Jyhan Artut
- (Austria) * Maik Langendorf
  *German residence

Austrian Darts Open
- (Austria) Nico Mandl
- (Austria) Zoran Lerchbacher
- (Austria) Rowby-John Rodriguez
- (Austria) Roxy-James Rodriguez

European Darts Open
- (Germany) Martin Schindler
- (Germany) Stefan Stoyke
- (Germany) Holger Rettig
- (Germany) Fabian Herz
- (Germany) Max Hopp

International Darts Open
- (Austria) Maik Langendorf
- (Germany) René Eidams
- (Germany) Max Hopp
- (Germany) Dragutin Horvat
- (Germany) Mike Holz

European Darts Trophy
- (Germany) Max Hopp
- (Germany) Jyhan Artut
- (Germany) Kevin Münch
- (Germany) Martin Schindler
- (Germany) Justin Webers

European Darts Grand Prix
- (Germany) Max Hopp
- (Germany) Dragutin Horvat
- (Germany) Martin Schindler
- (Germany) Fabian Herz
- (Germany) Robert Allenstein
- (Germany) Gabriel Clemens

German Darts Ch'ship
- (Germany) Stefan Stoyke
- (Germany) Mike Holz
- (Germany) Marko Puls
- (Germany) Robert Allenstein
