= 2013 Malta Open darts =

Malta Open

Tournament information
- Dates: 12 November 2013
- Venue: Topaz Hotel
- Location: Buġibba
- Country: Malta
- Organisation(s): BDO, WDF, MDA
- Winner's share: €1,200

Champion(s)
- (England) Ricky Williams

2013 Malta Open was a darts tournament part of the annual, Malta Open, which took place at the Topaz Hotel in Buġibba, Malta in 2013.

== Results ==
Round	Player
Winner	(England) Ricky Williams
Final	(England) Andy Keen
Semi-finals	(Netherlands) Ron Meulenkamp
Semi-finals	(Netherlands) Michel de Cuyper
Quarter-finals	(Netherlands) Matthew Medhurst
Quarter-finals	(England) Peter Smith
Quarter-finals	(Malta) Albert Scerri
Quarter-finals	(England) Andrew McNickol
Last 16	(Malta) Martin Azzopardi
Last 16	(Germany) Andreas Krockel
Last 16	(Malta) Charles Ghiller
Last 16	(Malta) Norbert Attard
Last 16	(England) Bob Avenall
Last 16	(Germany) Klaus Rohlederer
Last 16	(England) Dave Irwin
Last 16	(Malta) Neville Grech
Last 32	(Malta) Stephen Grima
Last 32	(Germany) Kai Geselle
Last 32	(Netherlands) Joep Smetsers
Last 32	(Germany) Colin Rice
Last 32	(Malta) Kirsten Aquilina
Last 32	(Malta) Brian Abela
Last 32	(Malta) Alfred Desira
Last 32	(England) Nicholas Bunn
Last 32	(England) Norman Purvis
Last 32	(England) Steve Pearce
Last 32	(Italy) Luca Catallo
Last 32	(Malta) Tony Demanuele
Last 32	(Malta) John Ciantar
Last 32	(England) Barry Milkens
Last 32	(Malta) Joe Abela
Last 32	(Malta) Paul Aquilina
