= 2023 European Darts Open =

2023 Interwetten European Darts Open

Tournament information
- Dates: 24–26 March 2023
- Venue: Ostermann-Arena
- Location: Leverkusen, Germany
- Organisation(s): Professional Darts Corporation (PDC)
- Format: Legs
- Prize fund: £175,000
- Winner's share: £30,000
- High checkout: 170; Ricardo Pietreczko; Andy Boulton

Champion(s)
- Gerwyn Price

The 2023 European Darts Open (known for sponsorship reasons as the 2023 Interwetten European Darts Open) was a professional darts tournament that took place at Ostermann-Arena in Leverkusen, Germany from 24 to 26 March 2023. It was the second of thirteen European Tour events on the 2023 PDC Pro Tour. It featured a field of 48 players and £175,000 in prize money, with £30,000 going to the winner.

Michael van Gerwen was the defending champion after defeating Dimitri van den Bergh 8–5 in the 2022 final, however he was defeated 6–4 by Gerwyn Price in the quarter-finals.

Gerwyn Price won his seventh European Tour title after defeating Dirk van Duijvenbode 8–7 in the final.

== Prize money ==
The prize money was increased for the first time in 4 years for all European Tours:

Stage (num. of players)		Prize money
Winner	(1)	£30,000
Runner-up	(1)	£12,000
Semi-finalists	(2)	£8,500
Quarter-finalists	(4)	£6,000
Third round losers	(8)	£4,000
Second round losers	(16)	£2,500*
First round losers	(16)	£1,250
Total	£175,000	

- Seeded players who lost in the second round of the event were not credited with prize money on any Order of Merit. A player who qualified as a qualifier, but later became a seed due to the withdrawal of one or more other players was credited with their prize money on all Orders of Merit regardless of how far they progressed in the event.

== Qualification and format ==
The top 16 entrants from the PDC Pro Tour Order of Merit on 31 January 2023 automatically qualified for the event and were seeded in the second round.

The remaining 32 places went to players from six qualifying events – 24 from the Tour Card Holder Qualifier (held on 13 February), two from the Associate Member Qualifier (held on 10 February), the two highest ranked Germans automatically qualified, alongside two from the Host Nation Qualifier (held on 10 February), one from the Nordic & Baltic Associate Member Qualifier (held on 17 February), and one from the East European Associate Member Qualifier (held on 11 February).

On 23 March, it was announced that Joe Murnan had withdrawn from the tournament for personal reasons, so using the new Reserve List system, José de Sousa (as the highest ranked non-qualifier) took his place.

On 25 March, Luke Humphries withdrew from the competition due to medical reasons, which meant that Brendan Dolan received a bye to the third round.

The following players took part in the tournament:

Top 16

1. ~~Luke Humphries~~ (withdrew)
2. Michael van Gerwen (quarter-finals)
3. Damon Heta (quarter-finals)
4. Rob Cross (semi-finals)
5. Peter Wright (second round)
6. Dave Chisnall (third round)
7. Michael Smith (third round)
8. Dirk van Duijvenbode (runner-up)
9. Joe Cullen (second round)
10. Gerwyn Price (champion)
11. Danny Noppert (semi-finals)
12. Ryan Searle (second round)
13. Martin Schindler (second round)
14. Jonny Clayton (second round)
15. Dimitri Van den Bergh (third round)
16. Josh Rock (quarter-finals)

Tour Card Qualifier
- Raymond van Barneveld (second round)
- Ryan Joyce (second round)
- Bradley Brooks (first round)
- Maik Kuivenhoven (first round)
- Stephen Bunting (third round)
- Jim Williams (second round)
- James Wade (second round)
- Ross Smith (third round)
- Chris Dobey (second round)
- Jurjen van der Velde (first round)
- Krzysztof Ratajski (second round)
- Ricardo Pietreczko (quarter-finals)
- ~~Joe Murnan (withdrew)~~
- Ryan Meikle (third round)
- Geert Nentjes (first round)
- Jermaine Wattimena (first round)
- Luke Woodhouse (first round)
- William O'Connor (third round)
- Ian White (second round)
- Steve Lennon (first round)
- Brendan Dolan (third round)
- Ted Evetts (second round)
- Daryl Gurney (first round)
- Pascal Rupprecht (first round)

Associate Member Qualifier
- John Henderson (first round)
- Andy Boulton (second round)

Highest Ranking Germans
- Gabriel Clemens (first round)
- Florian Hempel (first round)

Host Nation Qualifier
- René Eidams (second round)
- Nico Kurz (first round)

Nordic & Baltic Qualifier
- Marko Kantele (first round)

East European Qualifier
- Filip Šebesta (first round)

Reserve List Qualifier
- José de Sousa (first round)

== Draw ==
The draw and schedule was announced on 23 March. Numbers to the left of players' names show the seedings for the top 16 in the tournament. The figures to the right of a player's name state their three-dart average in a match. Players in bold denote match winners.

**First round** (best of 11 legs); 24 March
**Brendan Dolan 93.16**	**6**
Steve Lennon 92.86	1
Gabriel Clemens 100.15	5
**Ian White 98.69**	**6**
Alt	José de Sousa 90.14	0
**Ted Evetts 98.02**	**6**
**Ross Smith 100.20**	**6**
Pascal Rupprecht 92.55	0
**Ryan Joyce 99.66**	**6**
Jermaine Wattimena 94.14	4
**William O'Connor 89.48**	**6**
Marko Kantele 81.44	3
Geert Nentjes 88.73	2
**Ricardo Pietreczko 97.26**	**6**
**Stephen Bunting 89.24**	**6**
Daryl Gurney 87.52	5
**Raymond van Barneveld 98.71**	**6**
Filip Šebesta 98.63	3
Florian Hempel 85.86	1
**James Wade 95.42**	**6**
**René Eidams 85.45**	**6**
Jurjen van der Velde 82.70	4
**Krzysztof Ratajski 90.12**	**6**
Bradley Brooks 84.19	5
Luke Woodhouse 86.25	5
**Andy Boulton 98.45**	**6**
**Ryan Meikle 100.46**	**6**
Nico Kurz 90.13	2
**Jim Williams 93.95**	**6**
John Henderson 91.70	2
Maik Kuivenhoven 86.75	2
**Chris Dobey 95.33**	**6**

**Second round** (best of 11 legs); 25 March
1	Luke Humphries	w/d (Note: Humphries withdrew due to medical reasons)
**Brendan Dolan**	**w/o**
**16**	**Josh Rock 86.73**	**6**
Ian White 78.32	2
**8**	**Dirk van Duijvenbode 104.16**	**6**
Ted Evetts 100.01	3
9	Joe Cullen 85.84	4
**Ross Smith 92.36**	**6**
**4**	**Rob Cross 105.30**	**6**
Ryan Joyce 99.39	1
13	Martin Schindler 86.03	0
**William O'Connor 92.97**	**6**
5	Peter Wright 87.21	5
**Ricardo Pietreczko 87.81**	**6**
12	Ryan Searle 87.41	5
**Stephen Bunting 92.01**	**6**
**2**	**Michael van Gerwen 108.22**	**6**
Raymond van Barneveld 97.93	4
**15**	**Dimitri Van den Bergh 104.46**	**6**
James Wade 94.94	2
**7**	**Michael Smith 90.29**	**6**
René Eidams 84.02	3
**10**	**Gerwyn Price 109.03**	**6**
Krzysztof Ratajski 99.19	5
**3**	**Damon Heta 96.83**	**6**
Andy Boulton 91.14	4
14	Jonny Clayton 87.76	3
**Ryan Meikle 92.36**	**6**
**6**	**Dave Chisnall 91.02**	**6**
Jim Williams 83.30	2
**11**	**Danny Noppert 96.88**	**6**
Chris Dobey 80.10	2

**Third round** (best of 11 legs); 26 March
Dolan 90.37	5
**16**	**Rock 98.83**	**6**
**8**	**van Duijvenbode 97.35**	**6**
R. Smith 96.27	5
**4**	**Cross 110.18**	**6**
O'Connor 92.56	1
**Pietreczko 92.87**	**6**
Bunting 94.35	3
**2**	**van Gerwen 100.36**	**6**
15	van den Bergh 94.31	2
7	M. Smith 99.24	2
**10**	**Price 110.49**	**6**
**3**	**Heta 86.75**	**6**
Meikle 85.42	4
6	Chisnall 92.97	1
**11**	**Noppert 101.42**	**6**

**Quarter-finals** (best of 11 legs); 26 March
16	Rock 89.11	3
**8**	**van Duijvenbode 96.13**	**6**
**4**	**Cross 95.63**	**6**
Pietreczko 87.30	5
2	van Gerwen 99.46	4
**10**	**Price 106.28**	**6**
3	Heta 90.28	4
**11**	**Noppert 89.86**	**6**

**Semi-finals** (best of 13 legs); 26 March
**8**	**van Duijvenbode 98.98**	**7**
4	Cross 96.13	6
**10**	**Price 100.79**	**7**
11	Noppert 92.37	4

**Final** (best of 15 legs); 26 March
8	van Duijvenbode 98.27	7
**10**	**Price 96.28**	**8**
