= 2016 European Darts Matchplay =

Tournament information
- Dates: 13–15 May 2016
- Venue: Inselparkhalle
- Location: Hamburg, Germany
- Organisation(s): Professional Darts Corporation (PDC)
- Format: Legs
- Prize fund: £115,000
- Winner's share: £25,000
- High checkout: 170; Alan Norris; Daryl Gurney

Champion(s)
- James Wade (ENG)

The 2016 European Darts Matchplay is the fourth of ten PDC European Tour events on the 2016 PDC Pro Tour. The tournament takes place at Inselparkhalle in Hamburg, Germany, from 13 to 15 May 2016. It featured a field of 48 players and £115,000 in prize money, with £25,000 going to the winner.

Michael van Gerwen was the defending champion, but he lost in the semi-finals to the winner of the tournament, James Wade, who defeated Dave Chisnall 6–5 in the final.

== Prize money ==
The prize money of the European Tour events stays the same as last year.

Stage (num. of players)		Prize money
Winner	(1)	£25,000
Runner-up	(1)	£10,000
Semi-finalists	(2)	£5,000
Quarter-finalists	(4)	£3,500
Third round losers	(8)	£2,000
Second round losers	(16)	£1,500
First round losers	(16)	£1,000
Total	£115,000	

== Qualification and format ==
The top 16 players from the PDC ProTour Order of Merit on 4 March automatically qualified for the event and were seeded in the second round. The remaining 32 places went to players from three qualifying events - 20 from the UK Qualifier (held in Barnsley on 11 March), eight from the European Qualifier on 22 April and five from the Host Nation Qualifier on 12 May (it was originally four, but following the withdrawal of Phil Taylor, it was increased to five.)

The following players will take part in the tournament:

Top 16
1. (Netherlands) Michael van Gerwen (semi-finals)
2. (Scotland) Peter Wright (semi-finals)
3. (England) Michael Smith (third round)
4. (England) James Wade (winner)
5. (Belgium) Kim Huybrechts (second round)
6. (England) Dave Chisnall (runner-up)
7. (England) Ian White (second round)
8. (England) Adrian Lewis (third round)
9. (Netherlands) Jelle Klaasen (quarter-finals)
10. (England) Terry Jenkins (third round)
11. (Scotland) Robert Thornton (second round)
12. (Netherlands) Benito van de Pas (quarter-finals)
13. (Scotland) Gary Anderson (third round)
14. (Austria) Mensur Suljović (quarter-finals)
15. (Australia) Simon Whitlock (second round)
16. (England) Mervyn King (second round)

UK Qualifier
- (England) ~~Phil Taylor~~ (withdrew)
- (England) Richie Corner (first round)
- (England) Darren Webster (second round)
- (England) Josh Payne (first round)
- (England) Jamie Robinson (first round)
- (Northern Ireland) Daryl Gurney (third round)
- (England) Alan Norris (second round)
- (England) Ricky Williams (first round)
- (Scotland) John Henderson (third round)
- (Wales) Mark Webster (first round)
- (Wales) Jonny Clayton (second round)
- (Wales) Jonathan Worsley (first round)
- (England) Jamie Caven (third round)
- (England) Joe Murnan (first round)
- (England) Chris Dobey (second round)
- (England) Andrew Gilding (first round)
- (England) Darren Johnson (first round)
- (England) Kevin Painter (first round)
- (England) Joe Cullen (first round)
- (South Africa) Devon Petersen (first round)

European Qualifier
- (Netherlands) Michel van der Horst (first round)
- (Belgium) Mike De Decker (second round)
- (Netherlands) Vincent van der Voort (third round)
- (Netherlands) Ron Meulenkamp (second round)
- (Sweden) Magnus Caris (second round)
- (Austria) Rowby-John Rodriguez (second round)
- (Spain) Cristo Reyes (first round)
- (Netherlands) Remco van Eijden (second round)

Host Nation Qualifier
- (Germany) Max Hopp (quarter-finals)
- (Germany) Andree Welge (first round)
- (Germany) René Eidams (second round)
- (Germany) Jyhan Artut (first round)
- (Austria) Maik Langendorf (second round)

== Draw ==
First round (best of 11 legs); 13 May
(England) Andrew Gilding 81.70	1
(Netherlands) Remco van Eijden 85.75	6
(Northern Ireland) Daryl Gurney 87.70	6
(England) Kevin Painter 86.48	4
(Germany) René Eidams 80.95	6
(England) Ricky Williams 81.22	4
(Germany) Jyhan Artut 84.94	4
(England) Chris Dobey 85.91	6
(Netherlands) Vincent van der Voort 88.13	6
(England) Jamie Robinson 78.98	2
(England) Alan Norris 88.13	6
(England) Richie Corner 88.27	5
(South Africa) Devon Petersen 90.96	3
(Wales) Jonny Clayton 91.78	6
(Germany) Andree Welge 81.97	3
(Austria) Maik Langendorf 82.88	6
(England) Darren Webster 87.58	6
(Wales) Jonathan Worsley 75.68	1
(England) Jamie Caven 96.15	6
(England) Josh Payne 94.79	5
(England) Joe Murnan 91.76	5
(Germany) Max Hopp 87.36	6
(Spain) Cristo Reyes 84.44	3
(Sweden) Magnus Caris 84.14	6
(England) Joe Cullen 90.62	5
(Netherlands) Ron Meulenkamp 89.22	6
(Wales) Mark Webster 93.75	5
(Scotland) John Henderson 84.14	6
(Austria) Rowby-John Rodriguez 86.82	6
(Netherlands) Michel van der Horst 85.91	4
(England) Darren Johnson 86.61	3
(Belgium) Mike De Decker 87.70	6

Second round (best of 11 legs); 14 May
1	(Netherlands) Michael van Gerwen 98.78	6
(Netherlands) Remco van Eijden 89.34	2
16	(England) Mervyn King 99.05	3
(Northern Ireland) Daryl Gurney 104.25	6
8	(England) Adrian Lewis 90.43	6
(Germany) René Eidams 84.47	4
9	(Netherlands) Jelle Klaasen 97.40	6
(England) Chris Dobey 92.94	5
5	(Belgium) Kim Huybrechts 85.68	2
(Netherlands) Vincent van der Voort 92.00	6
12	(Netherlands) Benito van de Pas 107.35	6
(England) Alan Norris 98.79	3
4	(England) James Wade 100.88	6
(Wales) Jonny Clayton 98.33	4
13	(Scotland) Gary Anderson 90.70	6
(Austria) Maik Langendorf 87.21	3
2	(Scotland) Peter Wright 99.31	6
(England) Darren Webster 93.58	5
15	(Australia) Simon Whitlock 90.15	3
(England) Jamie Caven 96.07	6
7	(England) Ian White 82.99	2
(Germany) Max Hopp 89.60	6
10	(England) Terry Jenkins 92.05	6
(Sweden) Magnus Caris 85.67	1
6	(England) Dave Chisnall 100.63	6
(Netherlands) Ron Meulenkamp 92.64	2
11	(Scotland) Robert Thornton 85.63	4
(Scotland) John Henderson 91.28	6
3	(England) Michael Smith 91.58	6
(Austria) Rowby-John Rodriguez 78.00	1
14	(Austria) Mensur Suljović 95.94	6
(Belgium) Mike De Decker 84.24	0

Third round (best of 11 legs); 15 May
1	(Netherlands) van Gerwen 101.76	6
(Northern Ireland) Gurney 92.91	4
8	(England) Lewis 86.51	4
9	(Netherlands) Klaasen 89.79	6
(Netherlands) van der Voort 89.57	3
12	(Netherlands) van de Pas 93.44	6
4	(England) Wade 100.92	6
13	(Scotland) Anderson 96.73	2
2	(Scotland) Wright 99.89	6
(England) Caven 91.08	3
(Germany) Hopp 95.98	6
10	(England) Jenkins 90.23	3
6	(England) Chisnall 100.87	6
(Scotland) Henderson 89.61	4
3	(England) Smith 89.57	5
14	(Austria) Suljović 91.53	6

Quarter-finals (best of 11 legs); 15 May
1	(Netherlands) van Gerwen 106.75	6
9	(Netherlands) Klaasen 100.43	5
12	(Netherlands) van de Pas 96.04	5
4	(England) Wade 90.79	6
2	(Scotland) Wright 96.27	6
(Germany) Hopp 94.20	4
6	(England) Chisnall 101.13	6
14	(Austria) Suljović 98.09	4

Semi-finals (best of 11 legs); 15 May
1	(Netherlands) van Gerwen 97.19	2
4	(England) Wade 95.03	6
2	(Scotland) Wright 86.30	3
6	(England) Chisnall 93.81	6

Final (best of 11 legs); 15 May
4	(England) Wade 92.71	6
6	(England) Chisnall 93.55	5
