= 2017 Gibraltar Darts Trophy =

Tournament information
- Dates: 12–14 May 2017
- Venue: Victoria Stadium
- Location: Gibraltar
- Organisation(s): Professional Darts Corporation (PDC)
- Format: Legs; First to 6 legs
- Prize fund: £135,000
- Winner's share: £25,000
- High checkout: 170; John Henderson; Daryl Gurney

Champion(s)
- Michael Smith (ENG)

The 2017 Gibraltar Darts Trophy was the fifth of twelve PDC European Tour events on the 2017 PDC Pro Tour. The tournament took place at Victoria Stadium, Gibraltar from 12–14 May 2017. It featured a field of 48 players and £135,000 in prize money, with £25,000 going to the winner.

Michael van Gerwen was the defending champion after defeating Dave Chisnall 6–2 in the 2016 tournament, but he decided not to enter this tournament.

Michael Smith won his fourth PDC European Tour title by defeating Mensur Suljović 6–4 in the final.

== Prize money ==
This is how the prize money is divided:

Stage (num. of players)		Prize money
Winner	(1)	£25,000
Runner-up	(1)	£10,000
Semi-finalists	(2)	£6,000
Quarter-finalists	(4)	£4,000
Third round losers	(8)	£3,000
Second round losers	(16)	£2,000
First round losers	(16)	£1,000
Total	£135,000	

== Qualification and format ==
The top 16 players from the PDC ProTour Order of Merit on 27 April automatically qualified for the event and were seeded in the second round.

The remaining 32 places went to players from five qualifying events - 18 from the UK Qualifier (held in Wigan on 28 April), eight from the West/South European Qualifier (held on 4 May), four from the Host Nation Qualifier (held on 11 May), one from the Nordic & Baltic Qualifier (held on 17 March) and one from the East European Qualifier (held on 29 April).

Following the withdrawal of Adrian Lewis the day before the event started for family reasons, the number of Host Nation Qualifiers was increased from four to five.

The following players took part in the tournament:

Top 16
1. (Scotland) Peter Wright (semi-finals)
2. (Austria) Mensur Suljović (runner-up)
3. (Australia) Simon Whitlock (third round)
4. (England) Dave Chisnall (third round)
5. (England) James Wade (second round)
6. (Belgium) Kim Huybrechts (second round)
7. (Netherlands) Benito van de Pas (third round)
8. (Wales) Gerwyn Price (second round)
9. (England) Alan Norris (third round)
10. (Netherlands) Jelle Klaasen (second round)
11. (England) Ian White (third round)
12. (England) Michael Smith (champion)
13. (England) Joe Cullen (second round)
14. (Northern Ireland) Daryl Gurney (semi-finals)
15. (Spain) Cristo Reyes (third round)
16. (England) Stephen Bunting (third round)

UK Qualifier
- (Australia) Paul Nicholson (first round)
- (England) Darren Johnson (quarter-finals)
- (England) Alan Tabern (second round)
- (England) Steve Beaton (second round)
- (England) James Wilson (quarter-finals)
- (England) ~~Adrian Lewis (withdrew)~~
- (England) Chris Quantock (second round)
- (England) James Richardson (second round)
- (England) Darren Webster (second round)
- (England) Justin Pipe (first round)
- (England) Richie Corner (first round)
- (England) Callan Rydz (first round)
- (Scotland) John Henderson (second round)
- (England) Matt Clark (second round)
- (England) Matthew Dennant (first round)
- (Wales) Jonny Clayton (second round)
- (England) Ritchie Edhouse (first round)
- (England) Rob Cross (quarter-finals)

West/South European Qualifier
- (Germany) René Eidams (first round)
- (Netherlands) Jeffrey de Zwaan (first round)
- (Netherlands) Christian Kist (second round)
- (Germany) Martin Schindler (second round)
- (Belgium) Mike De Decker (first round)
- (Netherlands) Mario Robbe (first round)
- (Belgium) Dimitri Van den Bergh (third round)
- (Belgium) Ronny Huybrechts (first round)

Host Nation Qualifier
- (Gibraltar) Dyson Parody (first round)
- (Gibraltar) Justin Broton (first round)
- (Gibraltar) Dylan Duo (first round)
- (Gibraltar) Manuel Vilerio (first round)
- (Gibraltar) Antony Lopez (first round)

Nordic & Baltic Qualifier
- (Sweden) Magnus Caris (quarter-finals)

East European Qualifier
- (Poland) Krzysztof Ratajski (second round)

== Draw ==
First round (best of 11 legs); 12 May
(Poland) Krzysztof Ratajski 90.79	6
(England) Ritchie Edhouse 87.04	3
(Australia) Paul Nicholson 84.15	5
(England) Chris Quantock 84.20	6
(England) Darren Johnson 92.89	6
(Gibraltar) Manuel Vilerio 73.00	1
(England) Matt Clark 85.05	6
(Gibraltar) Justin Broton 79.05	3
(Belgium) Dimitri Van den Bergh 86.17	6
(Gibraltar) Antony Lopez 76.78	2
(Netherlands) Christian Kist 85.30	6
(Belgium) Ronny Huybrechts 86.58	4
(England) Justin Pipe 87.38	5
(Wales) Jonny Clayton 86.05	6
(England) Rob Cross 84.28	6
(Netherlands) Mario Robbe 75.74	0
(Netherlands) Jeffrey de Zwaan 84.88	4
(England) Alan Tabern 90.35	6
(England) James Richardson 85.83	6
(England) Matthew Dennant 79.37	1
(Germany) Martin Schindler 85.09	6
(England) Callan Rydz 83.08	4
(Sweden) Magnus Caris 85.29	6
(Gibraltar) Dyson Parody 82.01	1
(England) James Wilson 89.35	6
(Gibraltar) Dylan Duo 71.63	1
(Scotland) John Henderson 86.19	6
(Germany) René Eidams 82.54	4
(England) Steve Beaton 99.29	6
(Belgium) Mike De Decker 86.94	4
(England) Darren Webster 94.70	6
(England) Richie Corner 90.61	5

Second round (best of 11 legs); 13 May
1	(Scotland) Peter Wright 98.20	6
(Poland) Krzysztof Ratajski 94.47	3
16	(England) Stephen Bunting 94.78	6
(England) Chris Quantock 91.06	4
8	(Wales) Gerwyn Price 92.84	3
(England) Darren Johnson 94.96	6
9	(England) Alan Norris 88.43	6
(England) Matt Clark 89.01	5
5	(England) James Wade 94.36	5
(Belgium) Dimitri Van den Bergh 95.24	6
12	(England) Michael Smith 99.91	6
(Netherlands) Christian Kist 92.10	5
4	(England) Dave Chisnall 86.46	6
(Wales) Jonny Clayton 91.16	4
13	(England) Joe Cullen 91.94	5
(England) Rob Cross 93.83	6
2	(Austria) Mensur Suljović 103.94	6
(England) Alan Tabern 98.71	4
15	(Spain) Cristo Reyes 96.62	6
(England) James Richardson 90.42	5
7	(Netherlands) Benito van de Pas 83.53	6
(Germany) Martin Schindler 80.35	1
10	(Netherlands) Jelle Klaasen 88.08	3
(Sweden) Magnus Caris 95.59	6
6	(Belgium) Kim Huybrechts 93.43	4
(England) James Wilson 89.13	6
11	(England) Ian White 93.85	6
(Scotland) John Henderson 86.51	3
3	(Australia) Simon Whitlock 102.21	6
(England) Steve Beaton 86.32	1
14	(Northern Ireland) Daryl Gurney 92.01	6
(England) Darren Webster 89.56	3

Third round (best of 11 legs); 14 May
1	(Scotland) Wright 98.02	6
16	(England) Bunting 83.66	0
(England) Johnson 90.87	6
9	(England) Norris 81.59	3
(Belgium) Van den Bergh 98.00	5
12	(England) Smith 94.32	6
4	(England) Chisnall 99.05	2
(England) Cross 97.50	6
2	(Austria) Suljović 93.39	6
15	(Spain) Reyes 89.69	3
7	(Netherlands) van de Pas 90.00	2
(Sweden) Caris 86.42	6
(England) Wilson 94.70	6
11	(England) White 90.93	3
3	(Australia) Whitlock 98.94	4
14	(Northern Ireland) Gurney 98.08	6

Quarter-finals (best of 11 legs); 14 May
1	(Scotland) Wright 101.01	6
(England) Johnson 99.33	5
12	(England) Smith 99.46	6
(England) Cross 99.93	5
2	(Austria) Suljović 93.11	6
(Sweden) Caris 89.63	3
(England) Wilson 82.88	3
14	(Northern Ireland) Gurney 85.48	6

Semi-finals (best of 11 legs); 14 May
1	(Scotland) Wright 92.35	5
12	(England) Smith 93.84	6
2	(Austria) Suljović 94.11	6
14	(Northern Ireland) Gurney 86.88	5

Final (best of 11 legs); 14 May
12	(England) Smith 96.33	6
2	(Austria) Suljović 99.00	4
