= 2016 World Matchplay =

2016 BetVictor World Matchplay

Tournament information
- Dates: 16–24 July 2016
- Venue: Winter Gardens
- Location: Blackpool, England
- Organisation(s): Professional Darts Corporation (PDC)
- Format: Legs
- Prize fund: £450,000
- Winner's share: £100,000
- High checkout: 160; Justin Pipe; Kyle Anderson; Steve Beaton

Champion(s)
- Michael van Gerwen (NED)

The 2016 BetVictor World Matchplay was the 23rd annual staging of the World Matchplay, organised by the Professional Darts Corporation. The tournament took place at the Winter Gardens, Blackpool, from 16 to 24 July 2016.

Michael van Gerwen successfully defended his World Matchplay title by defeating Phil Taylor 18–10 in the final. It was the first (and would turn out to be, only) time that Taylor has been defeated in a World Matchplay final. Van Gerwen also became only the third player to successfully defend the Matchplay trophy after Taylor and Rod Harrington.

The second round was also reduced in length from best of 25 legs to best of 21 legs. This still remains the current format for the World Matchplay.

This tournament was the first time in the event's history that no matches went into 'extra legs', the first time that Taylor had been defeated in the final after winning his previous 15, and the first time that Robert Thornton won a match at the event. It was also the first time that James Wade was defeated before the World Matchplay quarter finals, after losing to Mervyn King in the first round.

== Prize money ==
The prize fund remained at £450,000 as it has been since the 2014 event.

Position (no. of players)		Prize money (Total: £450,000)
Winner	(1)	£100,000
Runner-Up	(1)	£50,000
Semi-finalists	(2)	£27,000
Quarter-finalists	(4)	£17,500
Second round	(8)	£10,000
First round	(16)	£6,000

== Format ==
In previous stagings of the event all games had to be won by two clear legs with no sudden-death legs. However, in 2013 after consulting the host broadcaster Sky Sports, the PDC decided that games will now only proceed for a maximum of six extra legs before a tie-break leg is required. For example, in a best of 19 legs first round match, if the score reaches 12–12 then the 25th leg will be the decider.

== Qualification ==
=== PDC Order of Merit Top 16 ===
1. (Netherlands) Michael van Gerwen (winner)
2. (Scotland) Gary Anderson (semi-finals)
3. (England) Phil Taylor (runner-up)
4. (England) Adrian Lewis (semi-finals)
5. (Scotland) Peter Wright (quarter-finals)
6. (England) James Wade (first round)
7. (England) Michael Smith (second round)
8. (Scotland) Robert Thornton (second round)
9. (England) Dave Chisnall (quarter-finals)
10. (Netherlands) Jelle Klaasen (first round)
11. (Netherlands) Raymond van Barneveld (first round)
12. (England) Ian White (second round)
13. (Belgium) Kim Huybrechts (first round)
14. (England) Stephen Bunting (first round)
15. (England) Terry Jenkins (second round)
16. (Netherlands) Vincent van der Voort (first round)

=== PDC ProTour qualifiers ===
1. (Netherlands) Benito van de Pas (first round)
2. (Austria) Mensur Suljović (second round)
3. (Wales) Gerwyn Price (second round)
4. (England) Alan Norris (first round)
5. (Australia) Simon Whitlock (first round)
6. (England) Joe Cullen (first round)
7. (Northern Ireland) Daryl Gurney (first round)
8. (England) Mervyn King (quarter-finals)
9. (England) Steve Beaton (quarter-finals)
10. (England) Justin Pipe (first round)
11. (Wales) Mark Webster (first round)
12. (England) Jamie Caven (first round)
13. (Australia) Kyle Anderson (second round)
14. (Northern Ireland) Brendan Dolan (second round)
15. (England) Josh Payne (first round)
16. (England) Robbie Green (first round)

== Draw ==
First round (best of 19 legs); 16–18 July
1	(Netherlands) Michael van Gerwen 105.85	10
(England) Jamie Caven 79.98	0
16	(Netherlands) Vincent van der Voort 89.99	4
(Australia) Kyle Anderson 92.34	10
8	(Scotland) Robert Thornton 91.19	10
(England) Josh Payne 85.87	7
9	(England) Dave Chisnall 94.37	10
(Netherlands) Benito van de Pas 89.23	7
5	(Scotland) Peter Wright 99.66	10
(England) Joe Cullen 87.73	5
12	(England) Ian White 91.46	10
(Northern Ireland) Daryl Gurney 84.49	2
4	(England) Adrian Lewis 93.96	10
(Wales) Mark Webster 88.62	6
13	(Belgium) Kim Huybrechts 97.89	8
(Wales) Gerwyn Price 95.10	10
2	(Scotland) Gary Anderson 101.28	10
(England) Alan Norris 91.06	1
15	(England) Terry Jenkins 85.75	10
(England) Justin Pipe 87.95	7
7	(England) Michael Smith 97.20	10
(Australia) Simon Whitlock 94.28	6
10	(Netherlands) Jelle Klaasen 93.00	6
(England) Steve Beaton 94.26	10
6	(England) James Wade 95.88	5
(England) Mervyn King 99.45	10
11	(Netherlands) Raymond van Barneveld 92.79	7
(Northern Ireland) Brendan Dolan 90.68	10
3	(England) Phil Taylor 98.72	10
(England) Robbie Green 88.13	8
14	(England) Stephen Bunting 102.48	8
(Austria) Mensur Suljović 98.44	10

Second round (best of 21 legs); 19–20 July
1	(Netherlands) Michael van Gerwen 102.97	11
(Australia) Kyle Anderson 87.77	3
8	(Scotland) Robert Thornton 88.24	2
9	(England) Dave Chisnall 99.67	11
5	(Scotland) Peter Wright 98.87	11
12	(England) Ian White 95.71	6
4	(England) Adrian Lewis 84.55	11
(Wales) Gerwyn Price 82.06	5
2	(Scotland) Gary Anderson 100.76	11
15	(England) Terry Jenkins 84.97	5
7	(England) Michael Smith 92.95	7
(England) Steve Beaton 99.16	11
(England) Mervyn King 89.05	11
(Northern Ireland) Brendan Dolan 89.74	8
3	(England) Phil Taylor 101.11	11
(Austria) Mensur Suljović 97.14	5

Quarter-finals (best of 31 legs); 21–22 July
1	(Netherlands) Michael van Gerwen 98.72	16
9	(England) Dave Chisnall 90.93	9
5	(Scotland) Peter Wright 95.93	14
4	(England) Adrian Lewis 97.33	16
2	(Scotland) Gary Anderson 96.52	16
(England) Steve Beaton 91.30	13
(England) Mervyn King 93.26	14
3	(England) Phil Taylor 101.41	16

Semi-finals (best of 33 legs); 23 July
1	(Netherlands) Michael van Gerwen 101.20	17
4	(England) Adrian Lewis 98.24	9
2	(Scotland) Gary Anderson 96.83	8
3	(England) Phil Taylor 101.27	17

Final (best of 35 legs); 24 July
1	(Netherlands) Michael van Gerwen 103.93	18
3	(England) Phil Taylor 101.13	10
