= 2016 European Championship (darts) =

2016 Unibet European Championship

Tournament information
- Dates: 28–30 October 2016
- Venue: Ethias Arena
- Location: Hasselt
- Country: Belgium
- Organisation(s): PDC
- Format: Legs
- Prize fund: £400,000
- Winner's share: £100,000
- High checkout: 170 (Australia) Simon Whitlock

Champion(s)
- (Netherlands) Michael van Gerwen

The 2016 Unibet European Championship was the ninth edition of the Professional Darts Corporation tournament, the European Championship, which saw the top European players from the ten European tour events compete against each other. The tournament took place from 28 to 30 October 2016 at the Ethias Arena in Hasselt, Belgium.

Michael van Gerwen was the defending champion, having beaten Gary Anderson 11–10 in the final of the 2015 tournament, and successfully defended his title, winning his third European Championship in a row, after defeating Mensur Suljović 11–1 in the final.

== Prize money ==
The 2016 European Championship will have a total prize fund of £400,000, a £100,000 increase since the previous staging of the tournament. The following is the breakdown of the fund:

Position (no. of players)		Prize money (Total: £400,000)
Winner	(1)	£100,000
Runner-Up	(1)	£40,000
Semi-finalists	(2)	£20,000
Quarter-finalists	(4)	£15,000
Last 16 (second round)	(8)	£10,000
Last 32 (first round)	(16)	£5,000

== Qualification ==
The 2016 tournament saw a change in terms of qualification. The top 32 players from the European Tour Order of Merit, which is solely based on prize money won in the ten European tour events during the season, qualified for the tournament. So, because of that former 2-time World Champion and previous tournament winner Adrian Lewis failed to qualify, having only played in three European Tour Events, and not winning enough money to make the list.

The following players took part in the tournament after the final standings of ten events, with the top 8 players being seeds:

1. (Netherlands) Michael van Gerwen (winner)
2. (Austria) Mensur Suljović (runner-up)
3. (Scotland) Peter Wright (semi-finals)
4. (England) James Wade (semi-finals)
5. (Belgium) Kim Huybrechts (first round)
6. (England) Dave Chisnall (first round)
7. (England) Alan Norris (first round)
8. (Netherlands) Jelle Klaasen (quarter-finals)
9. (England) Michael Smith (first round)
10. (Netherlands) Benito van de Pas (first round)
11. (England) Phil Taylor (quarter-finals)
12. (England) Terry Jenkins (first round)
13. (England) Ian White (second round)
14. (England) Stephen Bunting (second round)
15. (Northern Ireland) Daryl Gurney (first round)
16. (Australia) Simon Whitlock (first round)
17. (Wales) Gerwyn Price (second round)
18. (England) Joe Cullen (second round)
19. (Scotland) Gary Anderson (first round)
20. (Australia) Kyle Anderson (quarter-finals)
21. (Scotland) Robert Thornton (first round)
22. (England) Mervyn King (second round)
23. (England) Steve West (first round)
24. (England) James Wilson (quarter-finals)
25. (Netherlands) Jermaine Wattimena (first round)
26. (South Africa) Devon Petersen (first round)
27. (Germany) Max Hopp (second round)
28. (Spain) Cristo Reyes (second round)
29. (England) Justin Pipe (first round)
30. (England) Chris Dobey (first round)
31. (England) James Richardson (second round)
32. (England) Jamie Caven (first round)

== Draw ==
The draw was held on 16 October 2016.

First round (best of 11 legs); 28 October
1	(Netherlands) Michael van Gerwen 100.77	6
(Australia) Simon Whitlock 92.75	5
(Northern Ireland) Daryl Gurney 88.99	4
(Wales) Gerwyn Price 91.26	6
8	(Netherlands) Jelle Klaasen 97.17	6
(England) Steve West 95.71	3
(England) Michael Smith 95.00	5
(England) Stephen Bunting 99.55	6
5	(Belgium) Kim Huybrechts 94.55	3
(England) James Wilson 98.84	6
(England) Mervyn King 90.20	6
(South Africa) Devon Petersen 85.03	4
4	(England) James Wade 94.93	6
(Scotland) Gary Anderson 77.40	0
(Netherlands) Benito van de Pas 90.08	4
(Germany) Max Hopp 85.80	6
2	(Austria) Mensur Suljović 104.26	6
(Netherlands) Jermaine Wattimena 95.06	1
(England) Ian White 93.08	6
(England) Terry Jenkins 89.08	2
7	(England) Alan Norris 96.88	3
(England) Phil Taylor 109.28	6
(England) Joe Cullen 95.21	6
(England) Chris Dobey 84.83	2
6	(England) Dave Chisnall 91.57	3
(Australia) Kyle Anderson 92.98	6
(England) James Richardson 80.67	6
(England) Jamie Caven 77.73	3
3	(Scotland) Peter Wright 90.27	6
(England) Justin Pipe 89.76	5
(Scotland) Robert Thornton 93.77	4
(Spain) Cristo Reyes 96.83	6

Second round (best of 19 legs); 29 October
1	(Netherlands) Michael van Gerwen 105.50	10
(Wales) Gerwyn Price 96.59	2
8	(Netherlands) Jelle Klaasen 101.11	10
(England) Stephen Bunting 90.78	4
(England) James Wilson 93.64	10
(England) Mervyn King 99.23	9
4	(England) James Wade 97.03	10
(Germany) Max Hopp 87.31	3
2	(Austria) Mensur Suljović 100.89	10
(England) Ian White 97.57	9
(England) Phil Taylor 103.98	10
(England) Joe Cullen 94.63	3
(Australia) Kyle Anderson 94.95	10
(England) James Richardson 86.00	4
3	(Scotland) Peter Wright 100.79	10
(Spain) Cristo Reyes 93.52	7

Quarter-finals (best of 19 legs); 30 October
1	(Netherlands) Michael van Gerwen 106.79	10
8	(Netherlands) Jelle Klaasen 96.83	3
(England) James Wilson 87.01	7
4	(England) James Wade 91.22	10
2	(Austria) Mensur Suljović 105.50	10
(England) Phil Taylor 104.36	3
(Australia) Kyle Anderson 90.87	5
3	(Scotland) Peter Wright 95.59	10

Semi-finals (best of 21 legs); 30 October
1	(Netherlands) Michael van Gerwen 102.98	11
4	(England) James Wade 95.76	7
2	(Austria) Mensur Suljović 97.15	11
3	(Scotland) Peter Wright 98.34	8

Final (best of 21 legs); 30 October
1	(Netherlands) Michael van Gerwen 111.62	11
2	(Austria) Mensur Suljović 85.91	1
