= Daryl Gurney =

Northern Irish darts player (born 1986)

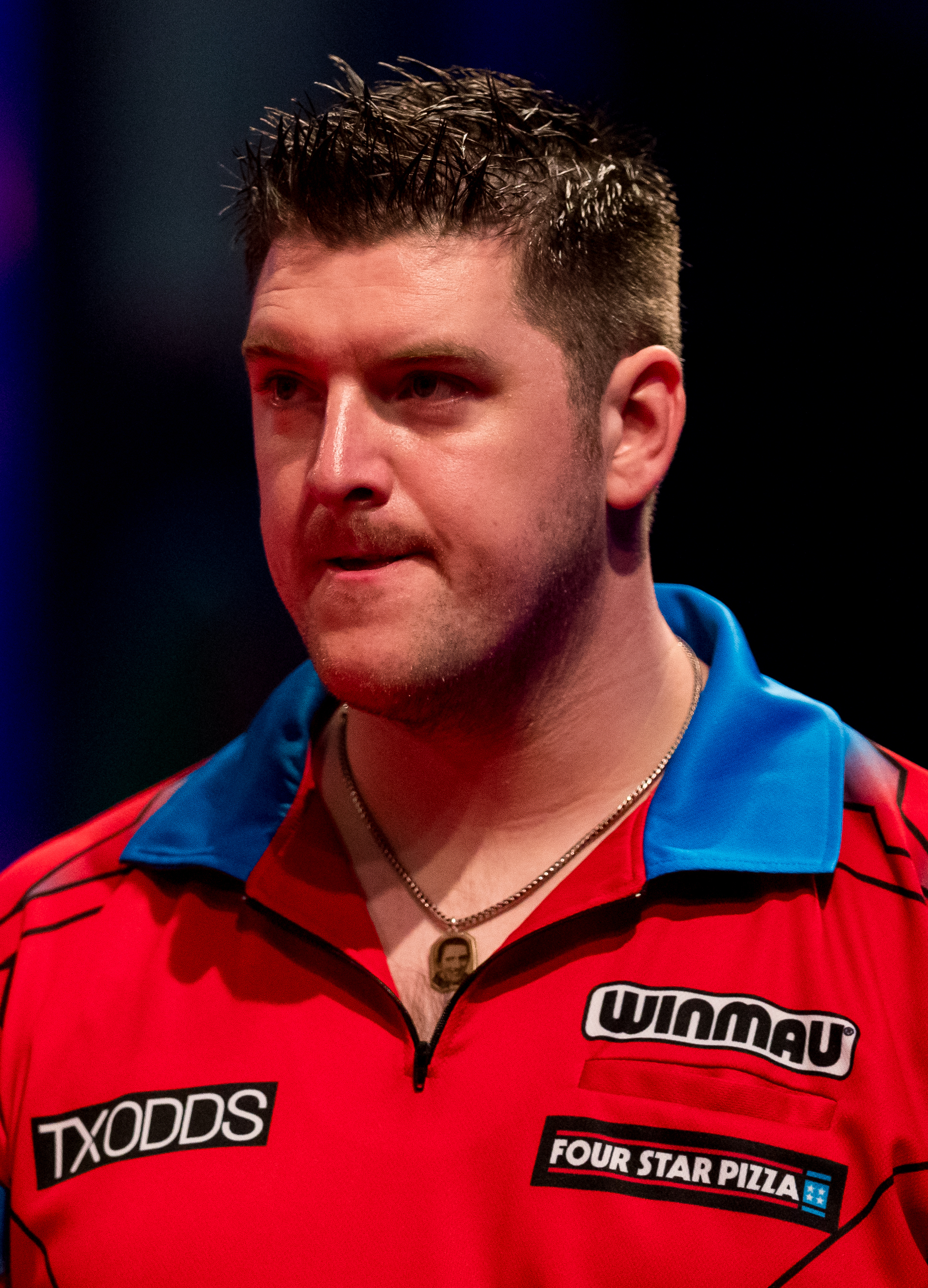
- Gurney in 2019

Personal information
- Nickname: "Superchin"
- Born: 22 March 1986 (age 40) Derry, Northern Ireland
- Home town: Tyrone, Northern Ireland

Sport
- Sport: Darts
- Playing since: 1996
- Darts: 23g Winmau Signature
- Laterality: Right-handed
- Walk-on music: "Sweet Caroline" by Neil Diamond

Organisation (see split in darts)
- BDO: 2004–2013
- PDC: 2013–present (Tour Card: 2013–present)
- Current world ranking: (PDC) 29 ▲2 (5 November 2026)

WDF major events – best performances
- World Championship: Last 16: 2009, 2010
- World Masters: Last 24: 2009

PDC premier events – best performances
- World Championship: Quarter-final: 2017, 2021
- World Matchplay: Semi-final: 2017, 2019
- World Grand Prix: Winner (1): 2017
- UK Open: Semi-final: 2017, 2020
- Grand Slam: Quarter-final: 2017
- European Championship: Semi-final: 2017, 2019
- Premier League: Semi-final: 2019
- PC Finals: Winner (1): 2018
- Masters: Quarter-final: 2024
- Champions League: Group Stage: 2018, 2019
- World Series Finals: Semi-final: 2017

Other tournament wins
- Years
PDC World Cup of Darts (Team event)	2025
England Masters	2012
Northern Ireland Open	2012
Tom Kirby Memorial Irish Matchplay	2012, 2014
European Tour Events
German Darts Championship	2019
Players Championships (x2)
2017, 2019
Medal record
Men's Darts
Representing Northern Ireland
WDF World Cup
Silver medal – second place	2009	Men's pairs
Bronze medal – third place	2007	Men's team
Bronze medal – third place	2009	Men's team
WDF Europe Cup
Silver medal – second place	2008	Men's singles

Daryl Gurney (born 22 March 1986) is a Northern Irish professional darts player who competes in Professional Darts Corporation (PDC) events, where he reached a peak ranking of world number three in 2019. Nicknamed "Superchin", he has won two PDC major singles titles: the 2017 World Grand Prix and the 2018 Players Championship Finals. Gurney also won the PDC World Cup of Darts in 2025, representing Northern Ireland alongside Josh Rock. He has won a total of six PDC titles in his professional career.

== Career ==
=== Early career ===
Gurney reached the quarter-finals of the 2008 Scottish Open, beating Andy Boulton and Alan Soutar before losing to Shaun Greatbatch. He then reached the final of the 2008 WDF Europe Cup, beating Stig Jorgensen in the quarter-finals and then beat Fabian Roosenbrand 4–0 in the semi-finals before losing to defending champion Mark Webster 4–0 in the final.

Gurney qualified for the 2009 BDO World Championships, beating former World Masters finalist Jarkko Komula before defeating Belgium's Kim Huybrechts to become the first Northern Irish player to qualify for Lakeside since Mitchell Crooks in 2001. He defeated 14th seed Garry Thompson in the first round to set up a second round encounter with 2007 champion and reigning Masters champion Martin Adams. Gurney levelled the match at one set all and then two sets all before losing 4-2.

The following year, Gurney qualified again, and once more played the 14th seed in the first round, this time the debuting Scott Mitchell. Gurney won the first two sets before Mitchell levelled the match and took a 2–0 lead in the decider, hitting nine out of twelve darts at double. But Gurney eventually prevailed 4–2 with consistent scoring. He once again played Adams in the second round, and was again defeated. Adams went on to win the title.

=== 2012–2013: Move to the PDC ===
In June 2012, Gurney won the England Masters, Northern Ireland Open and the Tom Kirby Memorial Trophy. In winning the latter, he earned a spot in the preliminary round of the 2013 PDC World Championship, where he edged out Robert Marijanović 4–3 in legs. Gurney then beat Andy Smith 3–1 in sets in the first round. He lost each of the first three sets in a deciding leg in the second round against Dave Chisnall and outscored him in the 180 count, but was beaten 4–1. In January 2013, Gurney entered Q-School in an attempt to win a two-year PDC Tour Card and was successful on the second day by winning six matches, concluding with a 6–2 victory over Paul Amos. His best result in his debut year on the tour came at the German Darts Championship, where Gurney defeated Colin Lloyd, Ronnie Baxter and Simon Whitlock in reaching the quarter-finals, but his run came to an end when he lost 6–2 against Peter Wright.

=== 2014 ===
Gurney's second quarter-final appearance in the PDC was at a UK Open Qualifier in February 2014 which he reached by eliminating world number one Michael van Gerwen 6–5 with a 146 checkout. He was beaten 6–4 by Andrew Gilding but the performance ensured he qualified for the UK Open itself for the first time and lost 5–4 to Ian White in the second round. Later in the year, Gurney made his debut in the World Grand Prix which he qualified for by being the second highest non-exempt Irish player on the Pro Tour Order of Merit. He came close to recording an upset in the first round against Adrian Lewis. In the deciding leg of the final set Gurney missed the bull for a 170 finish and two further darts at double eight, being beaten 3–2 in sets. However, he bounced back later in the week when he won the Tom Kirby Memorial Irish Matchplay title by defeating Radek Szagański in the final.

=== 2015 ===
Gurney's Irish Matchplay title earned him a place in the preliminary round of the 2015 World Championship and Scott MacKenzie missed one dart to eliminate him 4–0. Instead, Gurney levelled at 3–3 before MacKenzie missed a dart at double 11 to complete a 142 finish which allowed him to step in and seal a 4–3 win. Gurney then lost 3–1 against Ronnie Baxter in the first round. From the last 32 stage of the fifth UK Open Qualifier, Gurney beat Alan Norris, Peter Wright and Dave Chisnall to reach his first PDC semi-final where he was defeated 6–2 by Michael Smith. The performance helped him to enter the UK Open at the third round stage and he thrashed Kevin McDine 9–1 to play John Henderson in the fourth round. Gurney won five legs in a row between 13 and 15 darts to surge 8–7 ahead, before Henderson sent the tie into a deciding leg which he won. His second semi-final came at the 10th Players Championship event and he was eliminated 6–3 by Joe Murnan. Gurney lost 2–0 in sets to Robert Thornton in the first round of the World Grand Prix, but two quarter-final exits saw him play in the Players Championship Finals for the first time. He averaged 101.38 in a 6–2 victory over Kim Huybrechts and then knocked out reigning world champion Gary Anderson 10–4, winning the last six legs in a row, to reach his first major quarter-final. Gurney then advanced to the semi-finals with a 10–5 victory over Benito van de Pas, but from level at 2–2 with Michael van Gerwen, Gurney lost nine successive legs to exit the tournament.

=== 2016 ===
Gurney won the first set of his second round match against Anderson at the 2016 World Championship. He went on to lose 4–1, but missed a dart to win the second set and four to win the third. He averaged 105.18 in getting past Peter Wright 6–4 in the third round of the Dutch Darts Masters and then averaged 106.84 during a 6–4 quarter-final win over Adrian Lewis. Gurney swept into his first PDC final with a 6–1 win over Mensur Suljović, but lost 6–2 to world number one Van Gerwen. He was now Northern Ireland's number two player on the Order of Merit and so he teamed up with Brendan Dolan at the World Cup of Darts and they beat Japan, Ireland and Canada to reach the semi-finals, where they lost both their singles matches against the English pairing of Phil Taylor and Adrian Lewis. Gurney qualified for his first World Matchplay, but was ousted 10–2 by Ian White in the first round. He fared much better at the World Grand Prix, despite having taken a month off due to a broken bone in his throwing hand. He beat Mensur Suljović 2–1 in a deciding leg and Steve West 3–0 to make the quarter-finals, where he lost 3–1 to Dave Chisnall. Gurney was also knocked out in the first round of the European Championship 6–4 by Gerwyn Price and 6–1 by Kim Huybrechts in the second round of the Players Championship Finals.

=== 2017: World Grand Prix champion ===
After breaking into the top 32 on the PDC Order of Merit in 2016, Gurney was a seeded player for the first time at the 2017 World Championship and beat Jermaine Wattimena 3–1 in the first round. He won the first six legs of his second round match with Robert Thornton, but Thornton recovered to move 3–2 up. However, Gurney then took six of the final seven legs to move into the third round for the first time in his career and played Mark Webster. Gurney missed five darts to win 4–2, but held on to take it 4–3 and become the first player from Northern Ireland to reach a PDC World Championship quarter-final. His run ended with a 5–1 defeat to Michael van Gerwen. Comfortable victories over Alex Roy, Mark Webster and Vincent van der Voort saw Gurney advance to the quarter-finals of the UK Open. He then took five successive legs from 7–4 down to Simon Whitlock, but it still went to a deciding leg which Gurney took and dedicated the win to his best friend who died earlier in 2017. In the semi-finals he lost 11–5 to Peter Wright.

Gurney won his first PDC title by overcoming Kim Huybrechts 6–3 in the final of the seventh Players Championship. He got to the final of the eighth event a day later and he came from 4–1 down to level at 5–5 with Joe Cullen, but missed one dart at the bullseye to win. Gurney missed four match darts against Mensur Suljović in the semi-finals of the Gibraltar Darts Trophy.

In July, Gurney was invited to participate in the US Darts Masters as part of the World Series of Darts. He won his first round match against DJ Sayre, which included a 154 checkout, before defeating Peter Wright 8–7 in the quarter-finals on a last leg decider, before coming from 4–1 down to win 7 legs in a row to defeat Gary Anderson 8–4 in the semi-finals, to set up a final with Michael van Gerwen, which despite leading 5–3, he eventually lost 8–6. Later that month at the 2017 World Matchplay, Gurney reached the semi-finals for the first time.

Gurney won his first major televised title at the 2017 World Grand Prix, beating John Henderson 4–1 in the semi-finals and winning the last two sets of the final against Simon Whitlock to win the match 5–4.

=== 2018: Players Championship Finals champion ===
Gurney was eliminated in the second round of the 2018 PDC World Darts Championship, losing 4–2 to John Henderson, which was considered a big upset due to Gurney's status as World No. 4. Despite the loss, Gurney's 2017 success earned him a spot in the 2018 Premier League Darts, his debut in the tournament. He earned a win against reigning world champion Rob Cross in front of a home crowd in Belfast on Week 8. Gurney finished in fifth place at the end of the league stage. He also made his debut in the Champions League of Darts but was unable to get out of his group.

Gurney's title defence at the 2018 World Grand Prix was ended by Michael van Gerwen in the semi-finals, who beat Gurney 4–1.

At the 2018 Players Championship Finals, Gurney progressed past the second round with a victory over Ryan Searle, who missed match darts to beat Gurney. Gurney followed the scare by defeating Brendan Dolan, before 10–2 and 11–3 wins over Chris Dobey and Danny Noppert to set up a final with Michael van Gerwen. The match almost went the full 21-leg distance, but Gurney hit the bullseye for an 85 finish to win the final 11–9, earning his second major title.

=== 2019 ===
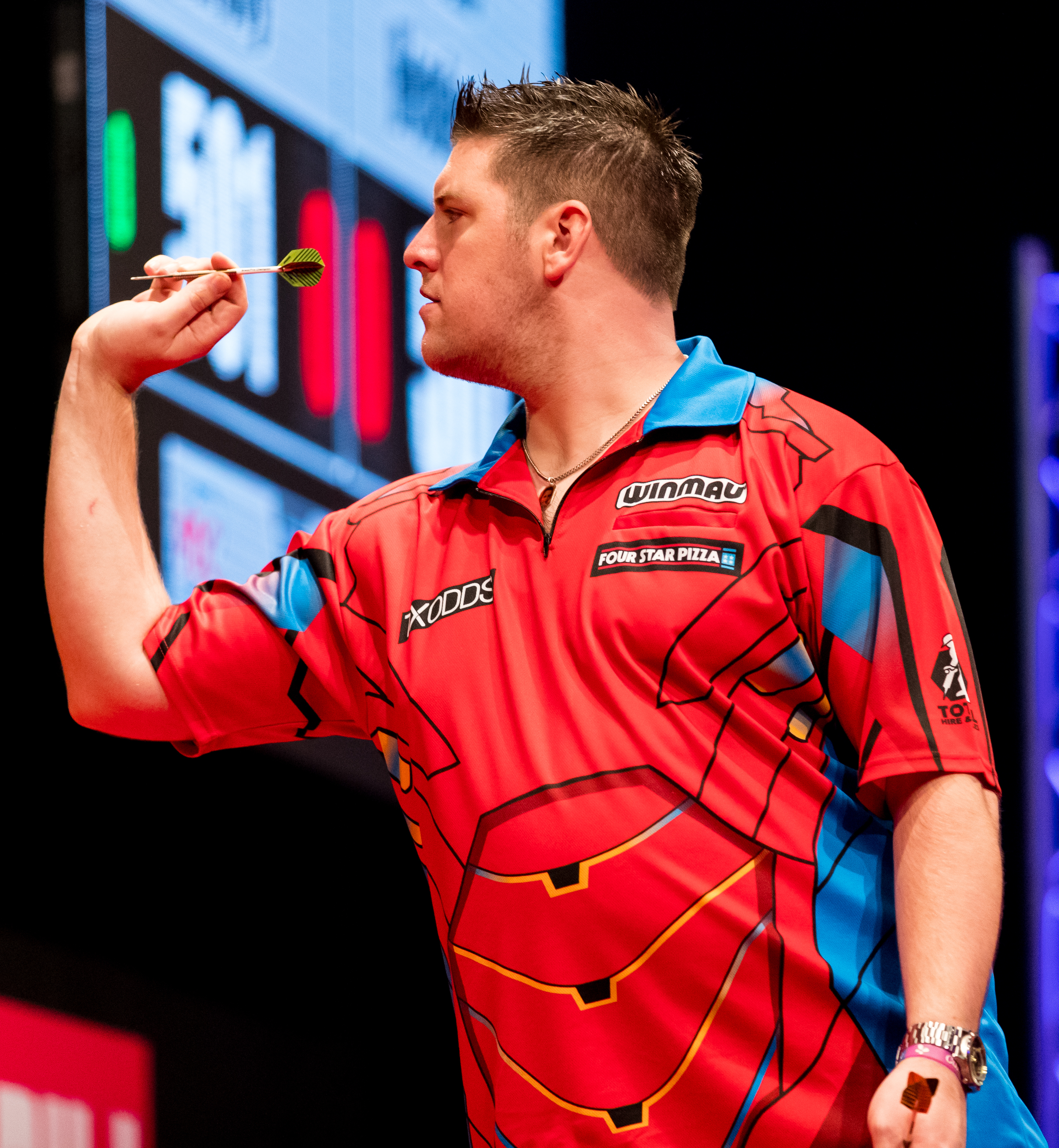
Gurney at the 2019 European Darts Matchplay

Gurney won his first match at the 2019 PDC World Darts Championship 3–0 against Ross Smith but exited the tournament in the third round in a 4–3 loss to 2018 World Championship semi-finalist Jamie Lewis.

Gurney won his first PDC European Tour title at the 2019 German Darts Championship, defeating Ricky Evans 8–6 in the final. The win saw Gurney rise to World No. 3, his highest career ranking.

During his 2019 Premier League Darts campaign, Gurney earned two wins over Michael van Gerwen, becoming the second player to complete a Premier League double against van Gerwen after Peter Wright achieved the feat in 2018. After his 7–7 draw with Gerwyn Price on Week 14 in Sheffield, Gurney exchanged heated words with Price, with the two almost becoming physical before being separated by security guards. Gurney reached the play-offs of the Premier League, losing in his semi-final match with Michael van Gerwen.

Gurney reached the final of the 2019 Melbourne Darts Masters, defeating Kyle Anderson, Simon Whitlock and Rob Cross along the way. He lost 8–3 to Michael van Gerwen in the final.

Gurney secured another title at Players Championship 25, beating Nathan Aspinall 8–5 in the final.

=== 2020 ===
Gurney suffered another third round loss at the 2020 PDC World Darts Championship in a 4–2 defeat to Glen Durrant.

At the 2020 UK Open, Gurney reached the semi-finals, a run which included a 10–6 win over reigning world champion Peter Wright. He was beaten 11–3 by eventual champion Michael van Gerwen.

Gurney was unable to play on the 2020 PDC Home Tour, a tournament launched amid the COVID-19 outbreak which allowed players to compete from their own homes. Gurney's facilities at his house were not deemed sufficient. Following his UK Open semi-final, Gurney experienced a downturn in form, losing early in the World Grand Prix, European Championship and Players Championship Finals. He dropped out of the world's top ten as a result.

=== 2021–2023 ===
Gurney reached the quarter-finals of the 2021 PDC World Darts Championship with wins over William O'Connor, Chris Dobey and Vincent van der Voort. He went to a deciding set against Gerwyn Price for a place in the semi-finals, but lost 5–4 to the eventual champion.

Gurney was eliminated in the third round of the 2022 PDC World Darts Championship by Rob Cross, who hit a 170 checkout to defeat Gurney in a deciding set. In March, Gurney made the semi-finals of the 2022 German Darts Championship but lost 7–4 to Rob Cross. Gurney defeated Cross in the opening round of the 2022 World Grand Prix, which was Gurney's first win at the event in four years.

At the 2023 PDC World Darts Championship, Gurney lost his opening match 3–0 to Alan Soutar. At the 2023 World Matchplay, Gurney won his first round match 12–10 against Rob Cross and followed it up with an 11–4 defeat over Gary Anderson, a match where Gurney averaged over 104. Gurney lost 16–11 to Joe Cullen in the quarter-finals.

=== 2024 ===
Gurney won his first match at the 2024 PDC World Darts Championship 3–1 against Steve Beaton in what turned out to be Beaton's last PDC World Championship match. Gurney then defeated Ricky Evans before losing to Dave Chisnall in the fourth round.

Gurney replaced Gerwyn Price in the 2024 Masters after Price withdrew from the tournament for family reasons. Gurney started in the second round where he defeated Joe Cullen 10–8. He lost 10–9 to Nathan Aspinall in the quarter-finals. In June, Gurney reached the final of Players Championship 11, but missed out on winning the title in a last leg decider loss to Alan Soutar. He made the semi-finals of the 2024 German Darts Championship, where he lost to Luke Littler. Gurney was among the Tour Card holder qualifiers for the 2024 World Series of Darts Finals, where he reached the quarter-finals after wins over Dirk van Duijvenbode and Gerwyn Price. He was eliminated after a 10–4 loss to Peter Wright.

At the 2024 World Grand Prix, Gurney drew Michael van Gerwen in the first round. Gurney defeated van Gerwen in a 2–0 whitewash where he won all six legs, marking the first time van Gerwen failed to win a leg in a televised ranking match in 13 years. Gurney lost to Joe Cullen in the next round.

=== 2025 ===
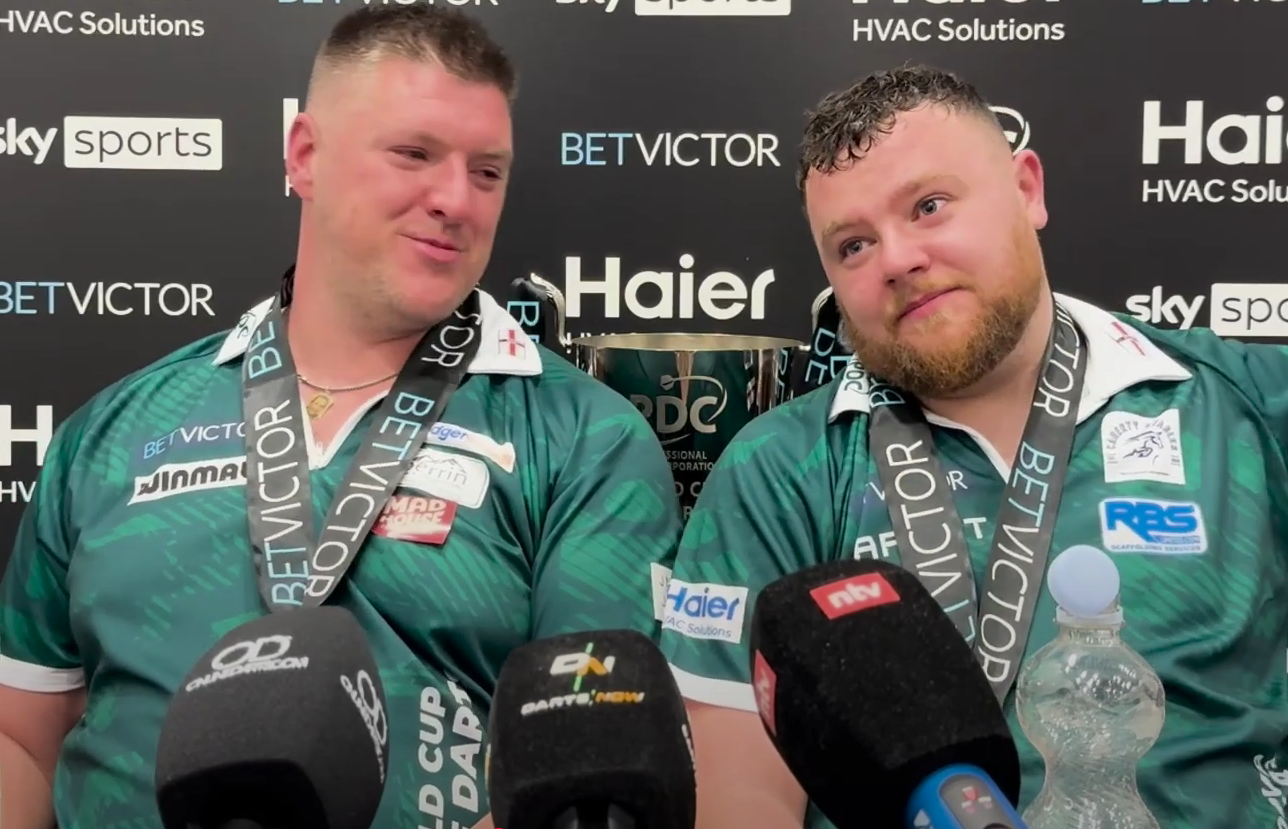
Gurney (left) and his Northern Ireland teammate Josh Rock after their win in the 2025 PDC World Cup of Darts

At the 2025 PDC World Darts Championship, Gurney recovered from 2–1 down to defeat Florian Hempel to set up a third round match against Jonny Clayton. Clayton took a 3–0 lead before Gurney won the next three sets to level the score at 3–3. Clayton won the deciding set 3–1 to put an end to Gurney's comeback.

Gurney and teammate Josh Rock won the World Cup of Darts for Northern Ireland for the first time, defeating Clayton and Gerwyn Price of Wales 10–9 in a deciding leg; Gurney hit double eight in the final leg to secure the title. Later in the year, he was a quarter-finalist at the European Championship and the Players Championship Finals.

=== 2026 ===
At the 2026 PDC World Darts Championship, 22nd seed Gurney faced three-time women's world champion Beau Greaves in a highly anticipated first-round match. The pair went to a deciding set, where Gurney hit a 144 checkout before securing a 3–2 victory. He lost 3–2 to Callan Rydz in the second round. In Northern Ireland's defence of the World Cup of Darts, Gurney and Josh Rock were beaten by the Netherlands in the semi-finals. Following the results of Players Championship 24, the final event before the qualification cut-off for the World Matchplay, Gurney dropped out of the qualification spots to miss the tournament for the first time since 2015.

== World Championship results ==
=== BDO World Championship ===
- 2009: Second round (lost to Martin Adams 2–4)
- 2010: Second round (lost to Martin Adams 1–4)

=== PDC World Championship ===
- 2013: Second round (lost to Dave Chisnall 1–4)
- 2015: First round (lost to Ronnie Baxter 1–3)
- 2016: Second round (lost to Gary Anderson 1–4)
- 2017: Quarter-finals (lost to Michael van Gerwen 1–5)
- 2018: Second round (lost to John Henderson 2–4)
- 2019: Third round (lost Jamie Lewis 3–4)
- 2020: Third round (lost Glen Durrant 2–4)
- 2021: Quarter-finals (lost to Gerwyn Price 4–5)
- 2022: Third round (lost Rob Cross 3–4)
- 2023: Second round (lost to Alan Soutar 0–3)
- 2024: Fourth round (lost to Dave Chisnall 2–4)
- 2025: Third round (lost Jonny Clayton 3–4)
- 2026: Second round (lost to Callan Rydz 2–3)

== Career finals ==
=== WDF major finals: 1 ===
Outcome	No.	Year	Championship	Opponent in the final	Score
Runner-up	1.	2008	Europe Cup Singles	(Wales) Mark Webster	0–4 (s)

=== PDC major finals: 2 (2 titles) ===
Legend
World Grand Prix (1–0)
Players Championship Finals (1–0)

Outcome	No.	Year	Championship	Opponent in the final	Score
Winner	1.	2017	World Grand Prix	Simon Whitlock	5–4 (s)
Winner	2.	2018	Players Championship Finals	Michael van Gerwen	11–9 (l)

=== PDC world series finals: 2 ===
Outcome	No.	Year	Championship	Opponent in the final	Score
Runner-up	1.	2017	US Masters	Michael van Gerwen	6–8 (l)
Runner-up	2.	2019	Melbourne Masters	Michael van Gerwen	3–8 (l)

=== PDC team finals: 1 (1 title) ===
Outcome	No.	Year	Championship	Team	Teammate	Opponents in the final	Score (Note: (l) = score in legs, (s) = score in sets, (m) = score in matches.)
Winner	1.	2025	World Cup of Darts	Northern Ireland	Josh Rock	Wales – Gerwyn Price and Jonny Clayton	10–9 (l)

== Performance timeline ==
=== BDO ===
Tournament	2004	2005	2007	2008	2009	2010	2011	2012
World Championship	Did not participate				2R	2R	DNP	
World Masters	2R	1R	1R	4R	5R	2R	3R	4R

=== PDC ===
Tournament	2013	2014	2015	2016	2017	2018	2019	2020	2021	2022	2023	2024	2025	2026
PDC Ranked televised events
World Championship	2R	DNQ	1R	2R	QF	2R	3R	3R	QF	3R	2R	4R	3R	2R
World Masters (Note: A non-ranked event until 2025)	Did not qualify					1R	1R	1R	2R	1R	DNQ	QF	Prel.	1R
UK Open	DNQ	2R	4R	3R	SF	4R	5R	SF	5R	4R	4R	4R	4R	6R
World Matchplay	Did not qualify			1R	SF	2R	SF	2R	1R	2R	QF	1R	1R	DNQ
World Grand Prix	DNQ	1R	1R	QF	W	SF	1R	1R	1R	2R	1R	2R	2R	DNQ
European Championship	Did not qualify			1R	SF	1R	SF	1R	DNQ	1R	2R	2R	QF	DNQ
Grand Slam (Note: A non-ranked event until 2015)	Did not qualify				QF	DNQ	2R	Did not qualify					RR	DNQ
Players Championship Finals	DNQ		SF	2R	QF	W	1R	1R	QF	2R	1R	3R	QF	
PDC Non-ranked televised events
Premier League	Did not participate					5th	SF	8th	Did not participate					
Champions League	Not held			DNQ		RR	RR	Not held						
World Cup	Did not qualify			SF	1R	2R	1R	1R	QF	QF	RR	DNQ	W	SF
World Series Finals	NH		DNQ	2R	SF	2R	2R	QF	Did not qualify			QF	DNQ	2R
Career statistics
Year-end ranking	96	61	37	24	4	5	6	11	22	26	26	25	23	

==== European Tour ====
Season	1	2	3	4	5	6	7	8	9	10	11	12	13	14	15
2013	UKM; 1R	Did not qualify				GDC; QF	GDM; 1R	DDM; 2R							
2014	Did not qualify				GDT; 2R	Did not qualify									
2015	GDC; DNQ	GDT; 1R	GDM; 1R	DDM; 1R	IDO; 3R	EDO; 1R	EDT; 2R	EDM; DNQ	EDG; DNQ						
2016	DDM; F	GDM; 2R	GDT; 2R	EDM; 3R	ADO; DNQ	EDO; 3R	IDO; WD	EDT; WD	EDG; WD	GDC; QF					
2017	GDC; DNQ	GDM; 2R	GDO; DNQ	EDG; 3R	GDT; SF	EDM; 3R	ADO; QF	EDO; 3R	DDM; QF	GDG; 3R	IDO; 2R	EDT; 2R			
2018	EDO; 2R	GDG; SF	GDO; 3R	ADO; QF	EDG; 2R	DDM; SF	GDT; 3R	DDO; 2R	EDM; 3R	GDC; 3R	DDC; 3R	IDO; 3R	EDT; QF		
2019	EDO; QF	GDC; W	GDG; 3R	GDO; 3R	ADO; SF	EDG; 3R	DDM; 2R	DDO; 3R	CDO; QF	ADC; 2R	EDM; 3R	IDO; QF	GDT; SF		
2020	BDC; DNP	GDC; QF	EDG; 2R	IDO; 2R											
2021	HDT; 2R	GDT; DNQ													
2022	IDO; 2R	GDC; SF	GDG; DNQ	ADO; DNQ	EDO; 2R	CDO; 2R	EDG; 3R	DDC; DNQ	EDM; 2R	HDT; 2R	GDO; 3R	BDO; DNQ	GDT; 1R		
2023	BSD; 2R	EDO; 1R	IDO; 1R	GDG; 1R	ADO; SF	DDC; 2R	BDO; 2R	CDO; DNQ	EDG; 3R	EDM; DNQ	GDO; 2R	HDT; 1R	GDC; 2R		
2024	BDO; 1R	GDG; 2R	IDO; 2R	EDG; 2R	ADO; 3R	BSD; 3R	DDC; 2R	EDO; 2R	GDC; SF	FDT; 1R	HDT; QF	SDT; QF	CDO; 1R		
2025	BDO; 3R	EDT; 1R	IDO; WD	GDG; 1R	ADO; QF	EDG; WD	DDC; 3R	EDO; 3R	BSD; 3R	FDT; SF	CDO; 1R	HDT; 2R	SDT; 1R	GDC; 1R	
2026	PDO; 2R	EDT; 2R	BDO; 3R	GDG; 2R	EDG; 1R	ADO; SF	IDO; 1R	BSD; 2R	SDO; 1R	EDO; 1R	HDT; 1R	CDO; 1R	DNQ		DDC; 1R

==== Players Championships ====
Season	1	2	3	4	5	6	7	8	9	10	11	12	13	14	15	16	17	18	19	20	21	22	23	24	25	26	27	28	29	30	31	32	33	34
2013	WIG; 1R	WIG; 2R	WIG; 1R	WIG; 1R	CRA; 2R	CRA; 2R	BAR; 1R	BAR; 1R	DUB; 2R	DUB; 1R	KIL; DNP	KIL; 4R	WIG; 1R	WIG; 3R	BAR; 2R	BAR; 4R																		
2014	BAR; 1R	BAR; 1R	CRA; 2R	CRA; 1R	WIG; 2R	WIG; 2R	WIG; 1R	WIG; 3R	CRA; 4R	CRA; 1R	COV; 2R	COV; 1R	CRA; 2R	CRA; 1R	DUB; 2R	DUB; 1R	CRA; 2R	CRA; 1R	COV; 2R	COV; 3R														
2015	BAR; 1R	BAR; 1R	BAR; 4R	BAR; 2R	BAR; 2R	COV; 3R	COV; 1R	COV; 1R	CRA; 1R	CRA; SF	BAR; 2R	BAR; 1R	WIG; 1R	WIG; QF	BAR; 4R	BAR; 1R	DUB; QF	DUB; 3R	COV; 3R	COV; 3R														
2016	BAR; QF	BAR; 1R	BAR; 4R	BAR; 2R	BAR; 4R	BAR; 1R	BAR; 3R	COV; 1R	COV; 3R	BAR; 1R	BAR; 4R	BAR; QF	BAR; 2R	BAR; DNP			DUB; 2R	DUB; SF	BAR; 3R	BAR; SF														
2017	BAR; 1R	BAR; SF	BAR; QF	BAR; 3R	MIL; 2R	MIL; 3R	BAR; W	BAR; F	WIG; 3R	WIG; 1R	MIL; F	MIL; 4R	WIG; SF	WIG; QF	BAR; F	BAR; SF	BAR; 4R	BAR; 4R	DUB; 1R	DUB; 1R	BAR; 4R	BAR; 2R												
2018	BAR; 1R	BAR; 3R	BAR; 3R	BAR; 1R	MIL; 2R	MIL; 3R	BAR; 4R	BAR; 2R	WIG; QF	WIG; 4R	MIL; 4R	MIL; 1R	WIG; 2R	WIG; 3R	BAR; 4R	BAR; 4R	BAR; F	BAR; 1R	DUB; 1R	DUB; 2R	BAR; 1R	BAR; 4R												
2019	WIG; 3R	WIG; 3R	WIG; 2R	WIG; 1R	BAR; 2R	BAR; 3R	WIG; F	WIG; 2R	BAR; DNP		BAR; 4R	BAR; 1R	BAR; SF	BAR; DNP			WIG; 3R	WIG; 2R	BAR; 2R	BAR; 3R	HIL; DNP		BAR; 1R	BAR; 2R	BAR; W	BAR; 3R	DUB; 4R	DUB; 3R	BAR; 4R	BAR; 1R				
2020	BAR; 2R	BAR; 2R	WIG; 1R	WIG; 1R	WIG; 2R	WIG; 4R	BAR; 4R	BAR; 3R	MIL; 1R	MIL; 3R	MIL; SF	MIL; QF	MIL; 4R	NIE; 3R	NIE; 3R	NIE; 4R	NIE; 1R	NIE; 3R	COV; 2R	COV; 3R	COV; 2R	COV; 3R	COV; QF											
2021	BOL; 3R	BOL; 2R	BOL; 4R	BOL; QF	MIL; 1R	MIL; 1R	MIL; 2R	MIL; 2R	NIE; 2R	NIE; 1R	NIE; 1R	NIE; QF	MIL; 3R	MIL; 1R	MIL; 1R	MIL; 3R	COV; 2R	COV; 1R	COV; 3R	COV; 4R	BAR; 4R	BAR; 1R	BAR; QF	BAR; 2R	BAR; 1R	BAR; 4R	BAR; 3R	BAR; 2R	BAR; 3R	BAR; 3R				
2022	BAR; SF	BAR; 3R	WIG; 4R	WIG; QF	BAR; QF	BAR; 3R	NIE; 1R	NIE; QF	BAR; 1R	BAR; 2R	BAR; 1R	BAR; 1R	BAR; DNP	WIG; 3R	WIG; 1R	NIE; 3R	NIE; 4R	BAR; QF	BAR; 2R	BAR; 2R	BAR; 1R	BAR; 1R	BAR; 1R	BAR; 2R	BAR; 1R	BAR; 1R	BAR; 1R	BAR; DNP	BAR; 2R	BAR; 3R				
2023	BAR; QF	BAR; 1R	BAR; 2R	BAR; 3R	BAR; 1R	BAR; 3R	HIL; 3R	HIL; 1R	WIG; 4R	WIG; 1R	LEI; 3R	LEI; 3R	HIL; 2R	HIL; 2R	LEI; 2R	LEI; 4R	HIL; QF	HIL; 3R	BAR; 1R	BAR; 2R	BAR; SF	BAR; 2R	BAR; 3R	BAR; QF	BAR; 3R	BAR; 3R	BAR; 3R	BAR; 2R	BAR; 1R	BAR; 4R				
2024	WIG; 3R	WIG; 3R	LEI; 4R	LEI; 1R	HIL; 4R	HIL; SF	LEI; QF	LEI; 4R	HIL; 3R	HIL; QF	HIL; F	HIL; 1R	MIL; 1R	MIL; 2R	MIL; 1R	MIL; 1R	MIL; 3R	MIL; 1R	MIL; SF	WIG; 1R	WIG; 3R	MIL; 1R	MIL; 3R	WIG; 1R	WIG; SF	WIG; 4R	WIG; 4R	WIG; 2R	LEI; 3R	LEI; 3R				
2025	WIG; 3R	WIG; 2R	ROS; 2R	ROS; 1R	LEI; 1R	LEI; 1R	HIL; 4R	HIL; 2R	LEI; 1R	LEI; 2R	LEI; 2R	LEI; 3R	ROS; 1R	ROS; 3R	HIL; DNP		LEI; 3R	LEI; 3R	LEI; 4R	LEI; QF	LEI; 3R	HIL; 2R	HIL; 4R	MIL; 1R	MIL; 4R	HIL; 1R	HIL; 2R	LEI; 2R	LEI; 3R	LEI; 2R	WIG; 1R	WIG; 3R	WIG; 2R	WIG; 1R
2026	HIL; 1R	HIL; 4R	WIG; 2R	WIG; QF	LEI; 3R	LEI; 3R	LEI; 3R	LEI; 4R	WIG; 3R	WIG; 2R	MIL; 1R	MIL; 3R	HIL; DNP		LEI; 2R	LEI; 1R	LEI; 3R	LEI; 3R	MIL; 3R	MIL; 3R	WIG; 1R	WIG; 2R	LEI; 1R	LEI; 1R	HIL; DNP		LEI; 3R	LEI; 1R	ROS; 3R	ROS; 1R	ROS; 1R	ROS; 1R	LEI; 3R	LEI; 4R

Performance Table Legend
W	Won the tournament	F	Finalist	SF	Semifinalist	QF	Quarterfinalist	#R; RR; Prel.	Lost in # round Round-robin; Preliminary round	DQ	Disqualified
DNQ	Did not qualify	DNP	Did not participate	WD	Withdrew	NH	Tournament not held	#R; RR; Prel.	Lost in # round Round-robin; Preliminary round	NYF	Not yet founded
