= Joe Cullen (darts player) =

English darts player (born 1989)

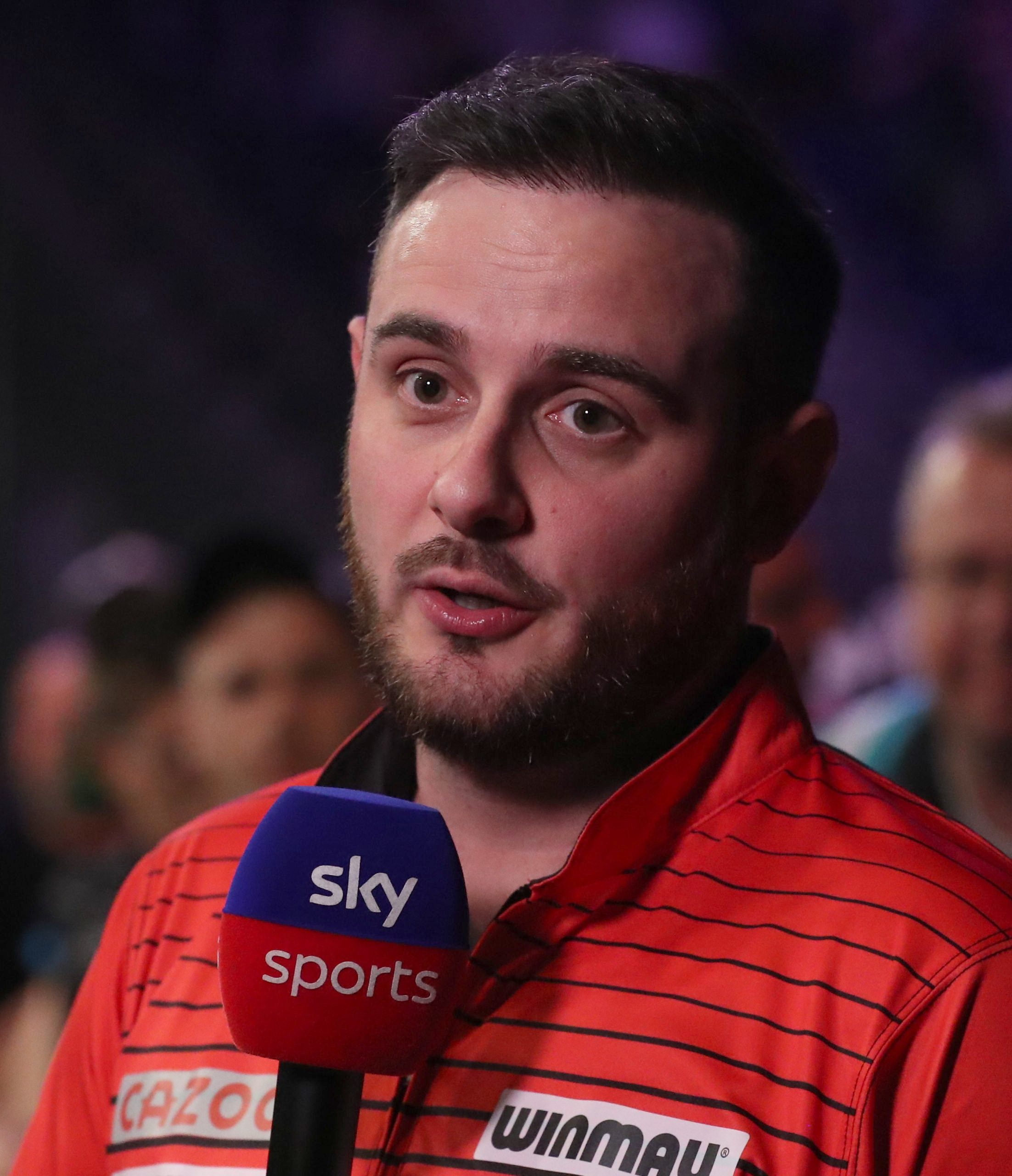
- Cullen at the 2022 Premier League Darts

Personal information
- Nickname: "The Rockstar"
- Born: 13 July 1989 (age 37) Bradford, England

Sport
- Sport: Darts
- Playing since: 2006
- Darts: 21g Winmau Signature
- Laterality: Right-handed
- Walk-on music: "Don't Look Back in Anger" by Oasis with intro to "Layla" by Derek and the Dominos

Organisation (see split in darts)
- PDC: 2008–present (Tour Card: 2011–present)
- Current world ranking: (PDC) 32 (5 November 2026)

PDC premier events – best performances
- World Championship: Last 16: 2021, 2023, 2024
- World Matchplay: Semi-final: 2023
- World Grand Prix: Semi-final: 2023
- UK Open: Quarter-final: 2016
- Grand Slam: Quarter-final: 2022
- European Championship: Semi-final: 2018, 2021
- Premier League: Runner-up: 2022
- PC Finals: Quarter-final: 2020, 2022
- Masters: Winner (1): 2022
- World Series Finals: Quarter-final: 2016, 2022

Other tournament wins
- Years
European Tour Events (×3)
European Darts Matchplay	2019
Hungarian Darts Trophy	2022
International Darts Open	2020
Players Championships (×9)
2017 (×2), 2020, 2021 (×2), 2022 (×2), 2025 (×2)
PDC Development Tour
2011 (×3)

Joe Cullen (born 13 July 1989) is an English professional darts player who competes in Professional Darts Corporation (PDC) events. Nicknamed "the Rockstar", Cullen won the 2022 Masters and finished as runner-up in the 2022 Premier League. He has won 12 PDC ranking titles in his professional career, including three European Tour titles.

In his youth career, Cullen won three PDC Youth Tour titles during the 2011 season, having made his PDC World Darts Championship debut at the 2011 edition. He won his first two PDC ranking titles on the 2017 Pro Tour and claimed his first European Tour title at the 2019 European Darts Matchplay. In 2022, Cullen won his first PDC major title at the Masters, defeating Dave Chisnall 11–9 in the final. The victory earned him a place in the 2022 Premier League, of which he reached the final, missing a match dart before losing 11–10 to Michael van Gerwen. He has reached the last 16 of the PDC World Championship on three occasions, most recently in 2024.

== Career ==
=== Early career ===
Cullen first came to prominence in 2008 when he qualified for the UK Open. He defeated Mark Stapleton and Dennis Smith before Chris Mason defeated him in the last 64. Following his performances at Bolton, he joined the PDC circuit. He also reached the final of the New Kids on the Oche tournament, losing to Arron Monk.

Cullen had another decent run at the 2010 UK Open. He knocked out Darren Latham and Mike Nott before losing to Mervyn King, again in the last 64. Later that year, he defeated Phil Taylor in the last 16 of the John McEvoy Gold Dart Classic in Killarney, eventually losing in the quarter-finals to Colin Osborne.

Cullen qualified for his first PDC World Darts Championship in 2011. He lost narrowly to Terry Jenkins 3–2 in sets in the first round. In April, Cullen reached his first PDC Pro Tour final at the sixth UK Open Qualifier in Barnsley, losing 6–1 to Taylor.

=== 2012 ===
Cullen reached the final of the PDPA World Championship Qualifier, where he was beaten by Arron Monk 5–3. The result meant that he qualified for the preliminary round of the 2012 World Championship, where he beat Oliver Ferenc 4–2 in legs. He played the 10th seed Terry Jenkins in the first round for the second successive year and was beaten 3–0, winning just three legs in the match. In April, he earned a place in the Austrian Darts Open by defeating Sam Hill and John Bowles in the UK qualifier. He played Brendan Dolan in the first round and won 6–4, and then continued his run by beating Simon Whitlock 6–4, despite his opponent hitting a nine darter. Cullen defeated Mark Walsh to make the quarter-finals, where he was this time on the wrong end of a 6–4 scoreline as he lost to eventual winner Justin Pipe. Cullen's best result of the season came a week after this as he won through to the semi-finals of the final UK Open Qualifier, but was then whitewashed 6–0 by Pipe. He also qualified for the third European Tour event, the European Darts Open and beat Jenkins 6–1 in the first round in Düsseldorf, before losing to Johnny Haines 6–5 in round two.

Cullen reached the last 16 of the UK Open with victories over Jim Walker (9–4) and Colin Lloyd (9–8), but then let a 4–0 and 5–1 lead against Jamie Caven slip to lose 9–8. He qualified for the World Matchplay for the first time and lost to Pipe 10–4 in the first round.

=== 2013 ===
Cullen qualified for the 2013 World Championship by finishing 36th on the 2012 ProTour Order of Merit, claiming the fifth of sixteen spots that were available for the highest non-qualified players. He lost 3–0 to John Part in the first round, with the Canadian's superior finishing being the difference between the players. Cullen was ranked world number 41 after the tournament. He lost 9–5 to Lee Palfreyman in the third round of the UK Open. At the Austrian Darts Open Cullen beat Kim Huybrechts 6–4 and then averaged a stunning 111.84 three-dart average in seeing off Stuart Kellett 6–1. He reached the quarter-finals of this event for the second year running by surviving one match dart from Raymond van Barneveld to win 6–5, but was then beaten 6–0 by Mervyn King. Cullen reached three other quarter-finals in floor events during the year but lost in each one.

=== 2014 ===
Cullen qualified for the 2014 World Championship through the ProTour Order of Merit once again and faced Peter Wright in the first round. Cullen took out a 147 finish to level the opening set with Wright on 12 but lost the decider and also lost the final leg in the second set and was beaten 3–0. He missed out on playing in the UK Open for the first time in his career as he failed to advance beyond the last 128 in any of the six qualifiers. At the 11th Players Championship of the year he reached the semi-finals of a ranking PDC event for the first in over two years, where he was defeated 6–3 by Gary Anderson. Cullen won through to the same stage of the 16th event with impressive victories over Dave Chisnall, Andy Hamilton and Michael van Gerwen, but this time lost 6–3 to Brendan Dolan.

=== 2015 ===
Cullen lost 3–1 to reigning champion Michael van Gerwen in the first round of the 2015 World Championship, after every set had gone to a deciding leg which included Cullen missing two darts for the second set. He was knocked out in the third round of the UK Open 9–6 by Eddie Dootson. Cullen lost in the quarter-finals of the first Players Championship 6–0 to Dave Chisnall and had to wait until October for another one. It came at the European Darts Grand Prix after he saw off Antonio Alcinas 6–3, Chisnall 6–2 and then averaged an outstanding 110.16 in defeating Raymond van Barneveld 6–2. However, in the quarters he lost 6–4 to Mensur Suljović. Cullen's third and final quarter-final of 2015 was at the 19th Players Championship after he ousted Ronnie Baxter, Ian White, Jamie Caven and Steve West, before losing 6–4 to Stephen Bunting.

=== 2016 ===
He took the final qualifying spot from the Pro Tour Order of Merit for the 2016 World Championship, but lost in the opening round for the sixth year in a row as he won just two legs during a 3–0 defeat to Jelle Klaasen. At the UK Open Cullen beat Mark Frost 9–1, Alan Norris 9–6 and Stephen Bunting 9–7 to play in his first major quarter-final. He produced a fightback from 9–3 down to Peter Wright, but would lose 10–7. This began a rich vein in form for Cullen as he reached the semi-finals of the first Players Championship event (lost 6–3 to Wright) and the same stage of the German Darts Masters (lost 6–1 to Michael van Gerwen after whitewashing reigning world champion Gary Anderson 6–0 in the quarters).

Cullen's second ever PDC final came at the ninth Players Championship, but he was thrashed 6–0 by Benito van de Pas. Another came at the 11th event and he was left waiting for his first professional title as Ian White won 6–3. Cullen qualified for the World Matchplay for the first time in four years and lost 10–5 to Wright in the opening round. Cullen made his debut at the World Grand Prix and he won the first set against Simon Whitlock, before losing six of the next seven legs to bow out. After seeing off Chris Dobey 6–2 at the European Championship he was heavily beaten 10–3 by Phil Taylor in the second round. A 13 dart leg from Cullen saw him squeeze past Anderson in to the quarter-finals of the non-ranking World Series of Darts Finals, where he lost to Wright in a televised match for the third time in 2016, this time 10–7. Cullen eased past Steve Brown 6–1 and Rowby-John Rodriguez 6–0 at the Players Championship Finals, but Raymond van Barneveld knocked him out 10–2 in the third round.

=== 2017 ===
After breaking into the top 32 on the Order of Merit during 2016, it meant Cullen was a seeded player at the World Championship for the first time in his career. He beat Corey Cadby 3–1 to finally reach the second round of the tournament at the seventh time of asking, but went on to lose 4–0 to two-time winner of the event Adrian Lewis in the next round.

Cullen joined the Professional Dart Players Association's 9 Dart Club for the first time, after getting a nine-dart finish in the second round of the 2017 PDC Players Championship 4 against Jim Brown.

Cullen claimed his first PDC Pro Tour title in April at the eighth Players Championship. He was 4–1 up in the final, before Daryl Gurney squared the match at 5–5. Gurney missed one match dart and Cullen won on double four and said afterwards that he had relied on his natural talent in the past, but in the last year he had also been working very hard on his game. A week after withdrawing from his third round match at the European Darts Open due to his father suffering a heart attack, he earned his second PDC title at Players Championship 16 by defeating Zoran Lerchbacher 6–4 in the final. He dedicated the victory to his father, stating: "He'd be proud of me. Hopefully he's on the mend now, he's back home and obviously things are looking up so I wanted to do it for him."

=== 2018 ===
Cullen was the 19th seed at the 2018 World Championship but suffered a first-round 3–2 defeat to Jermaine Wattimena, missing four match darts in the process. At the World Matchplay in July, he achieved his first win at the event with a 10–3 triumph over Gerwyn Price, before another wide victory in the second round against Daryl Gurney, defeating the fifth seed 11–3. This set up a quarter-final clash with Gary Anderson. After missing darts to send the contest to a sudden death leg, Cullen was beaten by Anderson 19–17. Cullen reached his first major semi-final at the European Championship by eliminating reigning world champion Rob Cross. He led his semi-final match against Simon Whitlock 10–7 but after missing a match dart, he allowed Whitlock to come back and win 11–10.

=== 2019–2021 ===
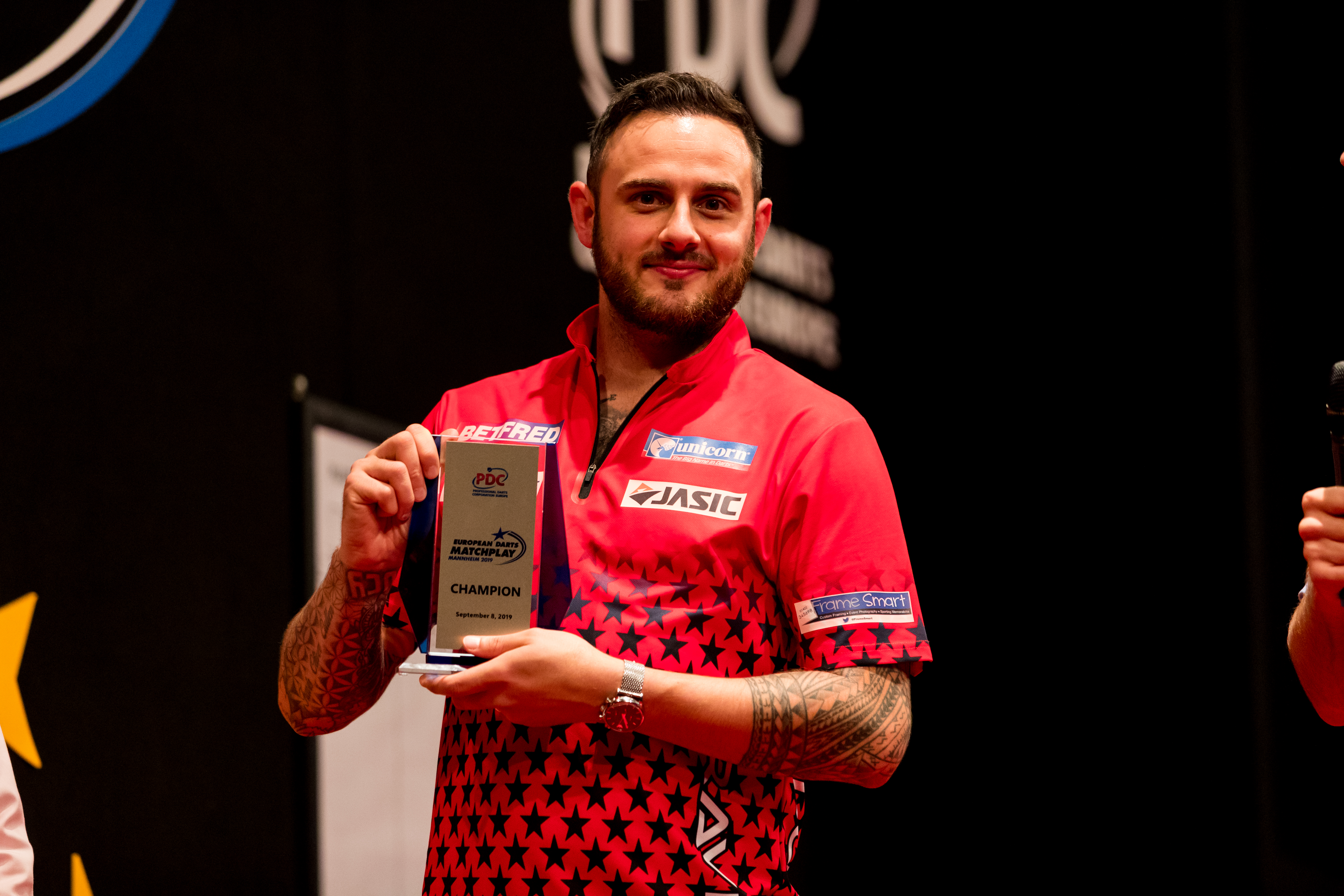
Cullen after winning the 2019 European Darts Matchplay

Cullen won his first two PDC European Tour titles at the 2019 European Darts Matchplay and the 2020 International Darts Open, defeating Michael van Gerwen 8–5 in both finals. He also won the final Players Championship event of 2020 by beating Krzysztof Ratajski 8–4.

Cullen won the opening Players Championship event of the 2021 PDC Pro Tour season. He defeated Gabriel Clemens in the quarter-finals and Nathan Aspinall in the semi-finals, before beating Jonny Clayton 8–7 in the final. He won a second title at Players Championship 13 by defeating world champion Gerwyn Price 8–6 in the final. Cullen was a semi-finalist at the European Championship in October, beating Mensur Suljović 10–7 in the quarter-finals before losing to eventual champion Rob Cross 11–3 in the semi-finals.

=== 2022 ===
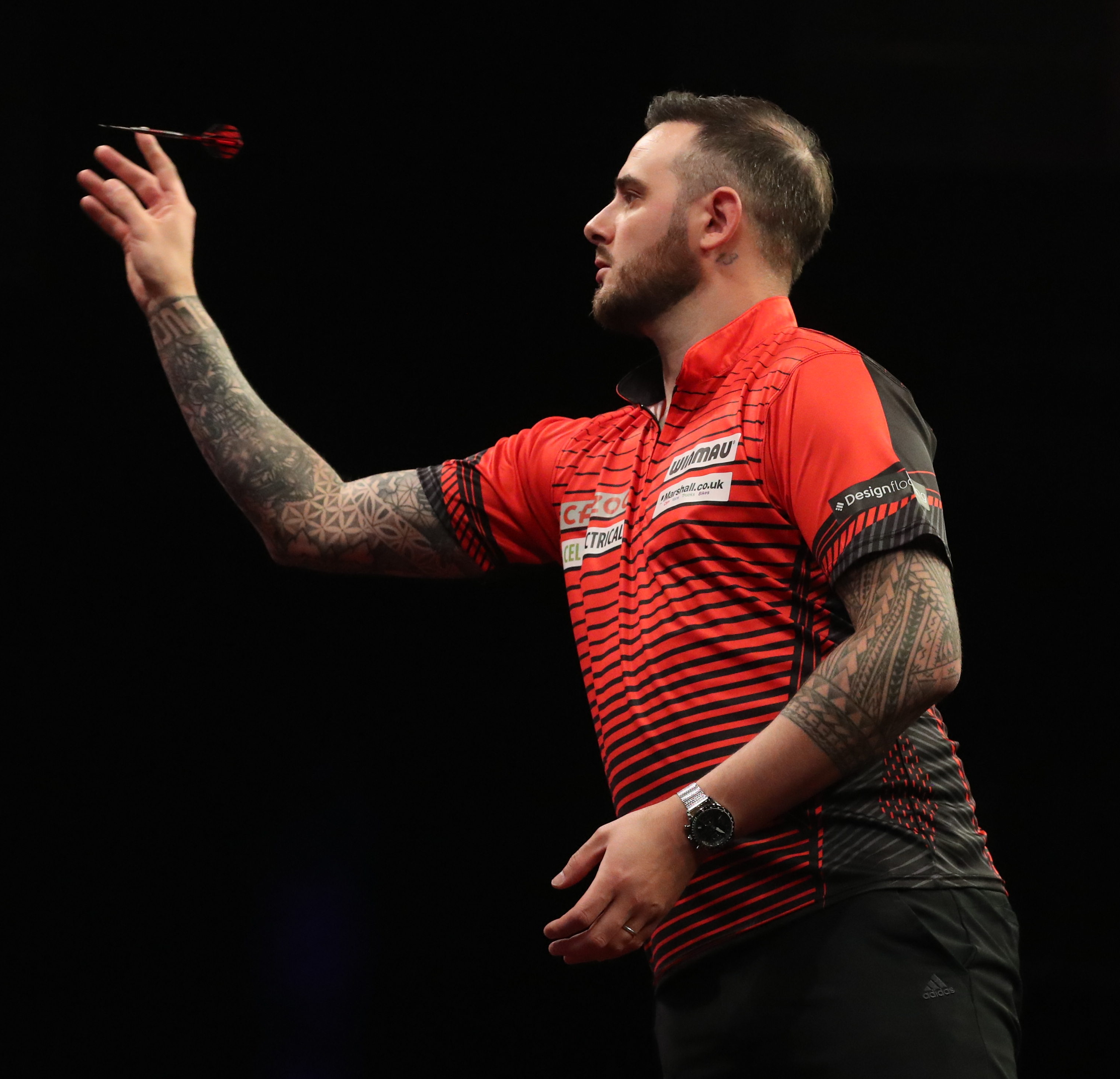
Cullen at the 2022 Premier League Darts play-offs

Entering the 2022 PDC World Darts Championship ranked 13th in the world, Cullen defeated Jim Williams 3–2 in the second round before losing 3–4 to debutant Martijn Kleermaker in the third round. On 30 January 2022, Cullen won a first televised PDC title when he won the 2022 Masters. Cullen defeated Daryl Gurney, Gary Anderson 10–1 with an average of 106.30, Michael van Gerwen and José de Sousa en route to the final. Despite missing ten match darts, he defeated Dave Chisnall 11–9 to secure his first televised PDC title.

Cullen joined the Professional Dart Players Association's 9 Dart Club for the second time, after getting a nine-dart finish in the third round of the 2022 PDC Players Championship 5 against James Wilson.

Cullen competed in his debut season in the Premier League in 2022; he finished 4th in the table and qualified for finals night on the last night of league play, by defeating Peter Wright in his final match. On 13 June, at finals night in Berlin, Cullen defeated Jonny Clayton 10–4 in the semi-finals to secure a place in the final against Michael van Gerwen, which he lost 11–10 after missing a match dart.

=== 2023 ===
Cullen made it to the fourth round of the 2023 PDC World Darts Championship. He was knocked out by the eventual winner Michael Smith.

Cullen reached back-to-back ranking major semi-finals at the World Matchplay and the World Grand Prix. His run to his first World Matchplay semi-final included a 13–11 win over tournament favourite Gerwyn Price in the second round. He defeated Daryl Gurney 16–11 to progress to the last four, where he faced Nathan Aspinall. Cullen was beaten 17–9. He also reached his maiden World Grand Prix semi-final after wins against Mike De Decker, Ross Smith and Chris Dobey. He was eliminated following a 4–0 defeat to Luke Humphries.

=== 2024 ===
Cullen reached the fourth round of the 2024 World Championship, where he faced Luke Humphries. Tied at 3–3 in sets, Cullen missed two darts at double 18 to win the match. The winner was decided in a sudden death leg, with Humphries hitting double 10 to win the final set 6–5 in legs and eliminate Cullen in a dramatic 4–3 victory.

Cullen reached two ranking finals during the year. He was the runner-up at the Austrian Darts Open, losing the final 8–4 to Luke Littler. He also reached the final at Players Championship 17 but he was beaten 8–6 by Josh Rock. His best performance at a major event during the year was a quarter-final at the World Grand Prix.

=== 2025 ===
Cullen qualified for the 2025 PDC World Darts Championship as the number 23 seed, receiving a bye to the second round due to his placement in the top 32, where he whitewashed Wessel Nijman 3–0 in sets. Following the victory, Cullen caused controversy for his post-match interview and press conference. He gave noticeably short answers in his interview with Sky Sports before prematurely leaving his press conference, citing a lack of respect shown to him by the media and bookmakers. He lost to Gerwyn Price in a sudden death leg in the third round. Cullen had trailed 3–0 but won the next three sets to level the match at 3–3 to force the last-set decider. The match was described as a "thriller" and an "Alexandra Palace classic".

He reached the final at the opening Players Championship event of the 2025 PDC Pro Tour season. His run to the final included wins against reigning World Champion Luke Littler, 6–3 in the last 32, and world number one Luke Humphries, 7–6 in the semi-finals. Cullen lost to Rob Cross 8–3 in the final. He was able to win his first PDC title since 2022 at Players Championship 5, coming back from 7–4 down and surviving six missed match darts from opponent Gian van Veen to win the final 8–7. He won a second title at Players Championship 27 by defeating Gerwyn Price 8–7 in the final.

=== 2026 ===
At the 2026 World Championship, 32nd seed Cullen defeated Bradley Brooks 3–0 in the first round. Following a 3–1 loss to Mensur Suljović in the second round, Cullen criticised his opponent's antics and slow style of play during the contest, calling it "cheating" and "not darts"; Suljović denied intentionally provoking Cullen with his behaviour. Cullen reached the final of Players Championship 8 in March, where he was beaten 8–4 by Wessel Nijman.

== Personal life ==
Cullen originally worked as a postman but quit his job to focus on darts full-time.

Cullen is a supporter of rugby league club Wigan Warriors, and conducted the draw for the Challenge Cup in 2024 alongside Michael Smith. He is also a supporter of English football club Manchester United.

== World Championship record ==
=== PDC ===
- 2011: First round (lost to Terry Jenkins 2–3)
- 2012: First round (lost to Terry Jenkins 0–3)
- 2013: First round (lost to John Part 0–3)
- 2014: First round (lost to Peter Wright 0–3)
- 2015: First round (lost to Michael van Gerwen 1–3)
- 2016: First round (lost to Jelle Klaasen 0–3)
- 2017: Second round (lost to Adrian Lewis 0–4)
- 2018: First round (lost to Jermaine Wattimena 2–3)
- 2019: Second round (lost to Brendan Dolan 0–3)
- 2020: Second round (lost to Nico Kurz 1–3)
- 2021: Fourth round (lost to Michael van Gerwen 3–4)
- 2022: Third round (lost to Martijn Kleermaker 3–4)
- 2023: Fourth round (lost to Michael Smith 1–4)
- 2024: Fourth round (lost to Luke Humphries 3–4)
- 2025: Third round (lost to Gerwyn Price 3–4)
- 2026: Second round (lost to Mensur Suljović 1–3)

== Career finals ==
=== PDC major finals: 2 (1 title) ===
Outcome	No.	Year	Championship	Opponent in the final	Score (Note: (l) = score in legs, (s) = score in sets.)	Ref.
Winner	1.	2022	Masters	Dave Chisnall	11–9 (l)	
Runner-up	1.	2022	Premier League	Michael van Gerwen	10–11 (l)	

== Performance timeline ==
Tournament	2008	2009	2010	2011	2012	2013	2014	2015	2016	2017	2018	2019	2020	2021	2022	2023	2024	2025	2026
PDC Ranked televised events
World Championship	Did not qualify			1R	1R	1R	1R	1R	1R	2R	1R	2R	2R	4R	3R	4R	4R	3R	2R
World Masters (Note: A non-ranked event until 2025)	Not held					Did not qualify						QF	1R	2R	W	1R	2R	1R	Prel.
UK Open	3R	1R	3R	4R	5R	3R	DNQ	3R	QF	5R	3R	4R	5R	4R	4R	6R	4R	4R	4R
World Matchplay	Did not qualify				1R	Did not qualify			1R	1R	QF	1R	2R	2R	2R	SF	2R	1R	1R
World Grand Prix	Did not qualify								1R	2R	1R	1R	QF	1R	2R	SF	QF	2R	1R
European Championship	Did not qualify								2R	1R	SF	2R	1R	SF	1R	1R	1R	DNQ	
Grand Slam	Did not qualify												RR	2R	QF	Did not qualify			RR
Players Championship Finals	NH	Did not qualify							3R	1R	3R	2R	QF	1R	QF	2R	1R	1R	
PDC Non-ranked televised events
Premier League	Did not participate														F	Did not participate			
World Series Finals	Not held							DNQ	QF	DNQ			1R	DNP	QF	DNP		1R	DNP
World Youth Championship	Not held			3R	2R	Did not participate													
Career statistics
Season-end ranking	267	118	61	48	41	37	44	48	28	19	15	15	16	11	12	12	23	35	

=== PDC European Tour ===
Season	1	2	3	4	5	6	7	8	9	10	11	12	13	14	
2012	ADO; QF	GDC; DNP	EDO; 2R	GDM; DNQ	DDM; DNQ										
2013	UKM; DNQ	EDT; 2R	EDO; DNQ	ADO; QF	GDT; 1R	GDC; DNQ	GDM; DNQ	DDM; 2R							
2014	GDC; DNQ	DDM; 3R	GDM; DNQ	ADO; DNQ	GDT; DNQ	EDO; DNQ	EDG; 2R	EDT; DNQ							
2015	GDC; 1R	GDT; DNQ	GDM; DNQ	DDM; 1R	IDO; DNQ	EDO; 2R	EDT; DNQ	EDM; DNQ	EDG; QF						
2016	DDM; DNQ	GDM; SF	GDT; 2R	EDM; 1R	ADO; DNQ	EDO; DNQ	IDO; 2R	EDT; 3R	EDG; 3R	GDC; QF					
2017	GDC; 3R	GDM; 2R	GDO; 3R	EDG; QF	GDT; 2R	EDM; QF	ADO; SF	EDO; 3R	DDM; 3R	GDG; 3R	IDO; SF	EDT; QF			
2018	EDO; QF	GDG; QF	GDO; QF	ADO; SF	EDG; QF	DDM; 2R	GDT; 3R	DDO; QF	EDM; 3R	GDC; SF	DDC; QF	IDO; 3R	EDT; 2R		
2019	EDO; 3R	GDC; 3R	GDG; QF	GDO; 3R	ADO; 2R	EDG; 2R	DDM; 2R	DDO; QF	CDO; 2R	ADC; 3R	EDM; W	IDO; 3R	GDT; 3R		
2020	BDC; 2R	GDC; 3R	EDG; 3R	IDO; W											
2021	HDT; QF	GDT; 3R													
2022	IDO; 3R	GDC; 3R	GDG; 2R	ADO; QF	EDO; 3R	CDO; 2R	EDG; 2R	DDC; 2R	EDM; 2R	HDT; W	GDO; SF	BDO; 3R	GDT; 3R		
2023	BSD; 3R	EDO; 2R	IDO; 2R	GDG; SF	ADO; QF	DDC; 2R	BDO; 2R	CDO; 2R	EDG; 3R	EDM; SF	GDO; 2R	HDT; 3R	GDC; 3R		
2024	BDO; 3R	GDG; 3R	IDO; 2R	EDG; 1R	ADO; F	BSD; 3R	DDC; 1R	EDO; 1R	GDC; 3R	FDT; 2R	HDT; 1R	SDT; 1R	CDO; 1R		
2025	BDO; DNQ	EDT; 1R	IDO; 2R	GDG; 3R	ADO; 3R	EDG; 2R	DDC; 1R	EDO; 1R	BSD; 1R	FDT; 2R	CDO; 1R	HDT; 2R	SDT; 2R	GDC; 1R	
2026	PDO; 2R	EDT; 2R	BDO; 1R	GDG; 1R	EDG; 3R	ADO; 1R	IDO; 2R	BSD; 2R	SDO; 2R	EDO; 2R	HDT; 2R	CDO; 1R	FDT; 1R	SDT; 1R	DDC; WD

=== PDC Players Championships ===
Season	1	2	3	4	5	6	7	8	9	10	11	12	13	14	15	16	17	18	19	20	21	22	23	24	25	26	27	28	29	30	31	32	33	34
2011	Did not participate						VIE; 3R	VIE; 3R	DNP			BAR; 2R	NUL; 3R	Did not participate							DUB; 2R	DUB; 2R	KIL; 3R	GLA; DNP	GLA; 3R	ALI; 3R	ALI; 3R	CRA; 2R	CRA; 2R	WIG; 4R	WIG; 2R			
2012	ALI; 3R	ALI; 1R	REA; 1R	REA; 1R	CRA; 1R	CRA; 1R	BIR; 3R	BIR; 2R	CRA; 4R	CRA; 1R	BAR; 2R	BAR; 4R	DUB; QF	DUB; 2R	KIL; 4R	DNP			BAR; 4R	BAR; DNP														
2013	WIG; 1R	WIG; 2R	WIG; 2R	WIG; 1R	CRA; 4R	CRA; 1R	BAR; 3R	BAR; QF	DUB; QF	DUB; 2R	KIL; 3R	KIL; 3R	WIG; 1R	WIG; 1R	BAR; 2R	BAR; 4R																		
2014	BAR; 2R	BAR; 1R	CRA; 1R	CRA; 1R	WIG; 1R	WIG; 2R	WIG; 1R	WIG; 1R	CRA; 2R	CRA; 3R	COV; SF	COV; 3R	CRA; 2R	CRA; 3R	DUB; 1R	DUB; SF	CRA; 2R	CRA; 2R	COV; 1R	COV; 1R														
2015	BAR; QF	BAR; 1R	BAR; 1R	BAR; 1R	BAR; 1R	COV; 1R	COV; 2R	COV; 1R	CRA; 1R	CRA; 2R	BAR; 1R	BAR; 4R	WIG; DNP		BAR; 1R	BAR; 1R	DUB; 3R	DUB; 1R	COV; QF	COV; 1R														
2016	BAR; SF	BAR; QF	BAR; 1R	BAR; 4R	BAR; 1R	BAR; 1R	BAR; 3R	COV; 3R	COV; F	BAR; 1R	BAR; F	BAR; 3R	BAR; SF	BAR; 4R	BAR; 1R	BAR; 3R	DUB; 1R	DUB; 3R	BAR; 4R	BAR; 2R														
2017	BAR; 1R	BAR; 2R	BAR; 2R	BAR; 3R	MIL; 1R	MIL; 2R	BAR; 1R	BAR; W	WIG; 2R	WIG; 2R	MIL; 1R	MIL; 4R	WIG; 2R	WIG; 1R	BAR; 3R	BAR; W	BAR; 3R	BAR; QF	DUB; 1R	DUB; 1R	BAR; 4R	BAR; 1R												
2018	BAR; 1R	BAR; 1R	BAR; QF	BAR; 1R	MIL; 1R	MIL; 1R	BAR; 1R	BAR; 3R	WIG; 2R	WIG; 1R	MIL; 2R	MIL; 1R	WIG; 4R	WIG; 1R	BAR; 2R	BAR; 4R	BAR; 4R	BAR; 3R	DUB; 2R	DUB; 4R	BAR; 2R	BAR; 1R												
2019	WIG; 4R	WIG; SF	WIG; 1R	WIG; 3R	BAR; 4R	BAR; 3R	WIG; 1R	WIG; 1R	BAR; 2R	BAR; 3R	BAR; 1R	BAR; 2R	BAR; 1R	BAR; QF	BAR; 1R	BAR; 1R	WIG; 2R	WIG; 3R	BAR; 4R	BAR; F	HIL; 1R	HIL; 4R	BAR; 1R	BAR; 3R	BAR; 3R	BAR; 1R	DUB; 2R	DUB; 3R	BAR; QF	BAR; 1R				
2020	BAR; QF	BAR; 1R	WIG; QF	WIG; 2R	WIG; 2R	WIG; 2R	BAR; 1R	BAR; 1R	MIL; 1R	MIL; 2R	MIL; 3R	MIL; 1R	MIL; 1R	NIE; 2R	NIE; F	NIE; 4R	NIE; SF	NIE; 1R	COV; 4R	COV; SF	COV; 1R	COV; QF	COV; W											
2021	BOL; W	BOL; 4R	BOL; F	BOL; 4R	MIL; SF	MIL; 4R	MIL; 2R	MIL; SF	NIE; Did not participate				MIL; W	MIL; QF	MIL; 3R	MIL; 2R	COV; 2R	COV; 1R	COV; 1R	COV; DNP	BAR; 4R	BAR; 1R	BAR; 1R	BAR; 3R	BAR; 1R	BAR; 3R	BAR; 2R	BAR; 4R	BAR; 1R	BAR; F				
2022	BAR; QF	BAR; 2R	WIG; W	WIG; W	BAR; SF	BAR; 3R	NIE; DNP		BAR; 1R	BAR; 4R	BAR; QF	BAR; 4R	BAR; 1R	WIG; 4R	DNP			BAR; 4R	BAR; 1R	BAR; 1R	BAR; 2R	BAR; 2R	BAR; 1R	BAR; DNP	BAR; 4R	BAR; 1R	BAR; 3R	BAR; DNP	BAR; 4R	BAR; 2R				
2023	BAR; 1R	BAR; 2R	BAR; 2R	BAR; SF	BAR; 1R	BAR; 3R	HIL; 3R	HIL; 1R	WIG; 4R	WIG; 1R	LEI; QF	LEI; QF	HIL; DNP		LEI; QF	LEI; SF	HIL; 1R	HIL; SF	BAR; QF	BAR; 2R	BAR; 3R	BAR; 1R	BAR; 1R	BAR; 4R	BAR; 4R	BAR; 1R	BAR; 1R	BAR; 2R	BAR; 1R	BAR; 1R				
2024	WIG; 1R	WIG; 2R	LEI; DNP		HIL; 4R	HIL; 1R	LEI; 3R	LEI; 1R	HIL; 1R	HIL; 1R	HIL; 1R	HIL; 1R	MIL; 1R	MIL; 1R	MIL; 3R	MIL; 1R	MIL; F	MIL; 2R	MIL; 1R	WIG; 1R	WIG; 2R	MIL; 1R	MIL; 3R	WIG; 2R	WIG; 3R	WIG; 1R	WIG; 1R	WIG; 1R	LEI; 1R	LEI; 3R				
2025	WIG; F	WIG; 3R	ROS; 1R	ROS; 1R	LEI; W	LEI; 3R	HIL; 1R	HIL; 1R	LEI; 1R	LEI; 2R	LEI; 1R	LEI; 2R	ROS; DNP		HIL; 4R	HIL; 3R	LEI; 1R	LEI; 2R	LEI; 1R	LEI; 2R	LEI; 3R	HIL; 3R	HIL; 1R	MIL; 1R	MIL; 2R	HIL; 3R	HIL; W	LEI; 1R	LEI; 1R	LEI; 2R	WIG; 1R	WIG; 2R	WIG; 3R	WIG; 3R
2026	HIL; QF	HIL; 1R	WIG; 1R	WIG; 4R	LEI; SF	LEI; 1R	LEI; 2R	LEI; F	WIG; 1R	WIG; 3R	MIL; 1R	MIL; 1R	HIL; 3R	HIL; 4R	LEI; QF	LEI; DNP	LEI; 1R	LEI; 3R	MIL; 1R	MIL; QF	WIG; DNP	WIG; 1R	LEI; 2R	LEI; 3R	HIL; DNP		LEI; 3R	LEI; 1R	ROS; DNP		ROS; 1R	ROS; 2R	LEI; 2R	LEI; 1R

Performance Table Legend
W	Won the tournament	F	Finalist	SF	Semifinalist	QF	Quarterfinalist	#R; RR; Prel.	Lost in # round Round-robin; Preliminary round	DQ	Disqualified
DNQ	Did not qualify	DNP	Did not participate	WD	Withdrew	NH	Tournament not held	#R; RR; Prel.	Lost in # round Round-robin; Preliminary round	NYF	Not yet founded
