= 2016 German Darts Masters =

Tournament information
- Dates: 26–28 March 2016
- Venue: Ballhausforum
- Location: Munich, Germany
- Organisation(s): Professional Darts Corporation (PDC)
- Format: Legs
- Prize fund: £115,000
- Winner's share: £25,000
- High checkout: 164 Dave Chisnall

Champion(s)
- Michael van Gerwen (NED)

The 2016 German Darts Masters was the second of ten PDC European Tour events on the 2016 PDC Pro Tour. The tournament took place at the Ballhausforum, Munich, Germany, from 26 to 28 March 2016. It featured a field of 48 players and £115,000 in prize money, with £25,000 going to the winner.

Michael van Gerwen was the defending champion, having beaten John Henderson 6–5 in the previous edition. He retained his title by defeating Peter Wright 6–4 in the final.

== Prize money ==
The prize money of the European Tour events stays the same as last year.

Stage (num. of players)		Prize money
Winner	(1)	£25,000
Runner-up	(1)	£10,000
Semi-finalists	(2)	£5,000
Quarter-finalists	(4)	£3,500
Third round losers	(8)	£2,000
Second round losers	(16)	£1,500
First round losers	(16)	£1,000
Total	£115,000	

== Qualification and format ==
The top 16 players from the PDC ProTour Order of Merit on 15 January automatically qualified for the event and were seeded in the second round.

The remaining 32 places went to players from three qualifying events - 20 from the UK Qualifier (held in Wigan on 17 January), eight from the European Qualifier on 23 January and four from the Host Nation Qualifier on 25 March.

The following players will take part in the tournament:

Top 16
1. (Netherlands) Michael van Gerwen (winner)
2. (England) Michael Smith (semi-finals)
3. (Scotland) Peter Wright (runner-up)
4. (England) James Wade (second round)
5. (Belgium) Kim Huybrechts (second round)
6. (England) Adrian Lewis (third round)
7. (England) Ian White (quarter-finals)
8. (England) Dave Chisnall (third round)
9. (Scotland) Robert Thornton (second round)
10. (Netherlands) Jelle Klaasen (third round)
11. (England) Terry Jenkins (second round)
12. (Scotland) Gary Anderson (quarter-finals)
13. (Netherlands) Benito van de Pas (third round)
14. (Northern Ireland) Brendan Dolan (second round)
15. (Austria) Mensur Suljović (second round)
16. (England) Justin Pipe (second round)

UK Qualifier
- (Scotland) Mark Barilli (first round)
- (England) Mark Walsh (second round)
- (England) Stephen Bunting (second round)
- (England) Alan Norris (first round)
- (England) Chris Dobey (quarter-finals)
- (England) Ben Davies (first round)
- (England) James Richardson (quarter-finals)
- (England) John Bowles (second round)
- (Northern Ireland) Daryl Gurney (second round)
- (England) Nathan Aspinall (first round)
- (England) Steve Beaton (first round)
- (England) Darren Johnson (first round)
- (England) Stuart Kellett (first round)
- (England) Andrew Gilding (first round)
- (England) Peter Hudson (first round)
- (England) Joe Cullen (semi-finals)
- (Republic of Ireland) William O'Connor (third round)
- (England) Kevin Painter (third round)
- (South Africa) Devon Petersen (second round)
- (England) James Wilson (third round)

European Qualifier
- (Spain) Cristo Reyes (third round)
- (Switzerland) Thomas Junghans (first round)
- (Belgium) Dimitri Van den Bergh (first round)
- (Netherlands) Mike Zuydwijk (first round)
- (Greece) John Michael (first round)
- (Netherlands) Jeffrey de Graaf (second round)
- (Belgium) Ronny Huybrechts (second round)
- (Netherlands) Jermaine Wattimena (second round)

Host Nation Qualifier
- (Germany) Tomas Seyler (first round)
- (Germany) René Eidams (second round)
- (Germany) Fabian Herz (first round)
- (Germany) Marko Puls (first round)

== Draw ==
First round (best of 11 legs); 26 March
(England) Peter Hudson 85.20	1
(Germany) René Eidams 86.19	6
(England) Kevin Painter 101.70	6
(England) Stuart Kellett 94.58	1
(England) Alan Norris 87.71	4
(Netherlands) Jermaine Wattimena 85.02	6
(England) Chris Dobey 96.63	6
(England) Ben Davies 83.76	1
(Republic of Ireland) William O'Connor 78.20	6
(Germany) Tomas Seyler 72.36	3
(Northern Ireland) Daryl Gurney 85.00	6
(Belgium) Dimitri Van den Bergh 84.70	3
(England) Joe Cullen 91.07	6
(Netherlands) Mike Zuydwijk 82.47	1
(South Africa) Devon Petersen 86.13	6
(England) Nathan Aspinall 86.07	5
(England) Darren Johnson 85.89	4
(Netherlands) Jeffrey de Graaf 86.08	6
(England) James Wilson 86.21	6
(Germany) Marko Puls 78.96	3
(England) Mark Walsh 82.32	6
(Switzerland) Thomas Junghans 74.28	2
(Belgium) Ronny Huybrechts 87.47	6
(Greece) John Michael 90.02	2
(England) John Bowles 91.75	6
(Germany) Fabian Herz 82.35	3
(England) Andrew Gilding 79.92	1
(England) James Richardson 88.01	6
(England) Stephen Bunting 97.63	6
(England) Steve Beaton 92.21	4
(Spain) Cristo Reyes 93.14	6
(Scotland) Mark Barilli 88.99	2

Second round (best of 11 legs); 27 March
1	(Netherlands) Michael van Gerwen 97.06	6
(Germany) René Eidams 92.84	3
16	(England) Justin Pipe 85.07	5
(England) Kevin Painter 88.26	6
8	(England) Dave Chisnall 96.40	6
(Netherlands) Jermaine Wattimena 90.69	4
9	(Scotland) Robert Thornton 96.28	4
(England) Chris Dobey 100.64	6
5	(Belgium) Kim Huybrechts 85.11	1
(Republic of Ireland) William O'Connor 86.23	6
12	(Scotland) Gary Anderson 106.59	6
(Northern Ireland) Daryl Gurney 89.05	1
4	(England) James Wade 90.09	4
(England) Joe Cullen 92.49	6
13	(Netherlands) Benito van de Pas 91.75	6
(South Africa) Devon Petersen 85.39	2
2	(England) Michael Smith 96.43	6
(Netherlands) Jeffrey de Graaf 88.33	5
15	(Austria) Mensur Suljović 96.00	4
(England) James Wilson 97.32	6
7	(England) Ian White 98.38	6
(England) Mark Walsh 89.06	2
10	(Netherlands) Jelle Klaasen 104.86	6
(Belgium) Ronny Huybrechts 90.74	0
6	(England) Adrian Lewis 99.04	6
(England) John Bowles 88.70	4
11	(England) Terry Jenkins 86.33	2
(England) James Richardson 91.91	6
3	(Scotland) Peter Wright 97.83	6
(England) Stephen Bunting 97.72	4
14	(Northern Ireland) Brendan Dolan 82.46	1
(Spain) Cristo Reyes 90.63	6

Third round (best of 11 legs); 28 March
1	(Netherlands) van Gerwen 102.85	6
(England) Painter 95.68	2
8	(England) Chisnall 89.68	4
(England) Dobey 102.25	6
(Republic of Ireland) O'Connor 93.03	2
12	(Scotland) Anderson 101.66	6
(England) Cullen 92.34	6
13	(Netherlands) van de Pas 95.44	5
2	(England) Smith 104.56	6
(England) Wilson 101.07	4
7	(England) White 100.60	6
10	(Netherlands) Klaasen 98.31	5
6	(England) Lewis 94.05	3
(England) Richardson 93.33	6
3	(Scotland) Wright 96.54	6
(Spain) Reyes 93.31	5

Quarter-finals (best of 11 legs); 28 March
1	(Netherlands) van Gerwen 108.55	6
(England) Dobey 100.63	5
12	(Scotland) Anderson 79.17	0
(England) Cullen 99.10	6
2	(England) Smith 91.25	6
7	(England) White 96.39	4
(England) Richardson 99.25	2
3	(Scotland) Wright 101.78	6

Semi-finals (best of 11 legs); 28 March
1	(Netherlands) van Gerwen 91.45	6
(England) Cullen 87.45	1
2	(England) Smith 87.81	4
3	(Scotland) Wright 95.62	6

Final (best of 11 legs); 28 March
1	(Netherlands) van Gerwen 92.72	6
3	(Scotland) Wright 93.20	4
