= René Eidams =

German darts player

Personal information
- Nickname: "The Cube"
- Born: 8 May 1989 (age 37) Hagen, West Germany
- Home town: Hagen, Germany

Sport
- Sport: Darts
- Playing since: 2009
- Darts: 23 Gram Target Storm Black
- Laterality: Right-handed
- Walk-on music: "Mama Laudaaa" by Almklausi & Specktakel

Organisation (see split in darts)
- PDC: 2014–

PDC premier events – best performances
- World Championship: Last 64: 2016
- UK Open: Last 64: 2016

Other tournament wins
- Years
PDC World Germany Qualifying Event	2015
PDC Challenge Tour	2024

René Eidams (born 8 May 1989) is a German darts player.

== Career ==
Eidams competed in his first Professional Darts Corporation (PDC) event in January 2014, when he qualified for the German Darts Championship. He lost 6–5 in the first round to Joey Palfreyman.

Eidams qualified for the preliminary round of the 2016 PDC World Darts Championship after beating Maik Langendorf 10–8 in the final of the Bulls Superleague qualifier. He averaged just 69.25 against Thailand's Thanawat Gaweenuntawong, but beat him 2–0 in sets and then fell 2–0 down to world number one Michael van Gerwen in the first round. However, Eidams won his first leg of the match with a 122 finish on the bull and then took five of the next six legs to send the match into a deciding set. A tiebreak was required to settle it and Van Gerwen won the two legs he needed to edge out Eidams, who averaged 90.48 during the contest. He played in 2016 Q School, but one last 32 defeat was not enough to win a two-year PDC tour card.

Two last 16 finishes in the qualifiers saw Eidams enter the 2016 UK Open at the third round stage and he lost 9–3 to James Wilson. He met Van Gerwen again in the second round of the German Darts Masters, after defeating Peter Hudson 6–1, and lost 6–3. He exited the European Darts Matchplay at the same stage after being beaten 6–4 by Adrian Lewis. Eidams lost 5−3 to Kelvin Hart in the final of the 12th Challenge Tour event. The last European Tour event he reached this year was the International Darts Open and he was eliminated 6–1 by Steve West in the first round.

== World Championship results ==
=== PDC ===
- 2016: First round (lost to Michael van Gerwen 2–3)

== Performance timeline ==
Tournament	2016	2018							
PDC Ranked televised events
PDC World Championship	1R	DNQ							
UK Open	3R	2R							
Career statistics
Season-end ranking (PDC)	102	132	139	-	-	-	200	190	192

PDC European Tour

Season	1	2	3	4	5	6	7	8	9	10	11	12	13	14
2014	GDC; 1R	Did not qualify/participate												
2016	DDM; DNQ	GDM; 2R	GDT; DNQ	EDM; 2R	ADO; DNQ	EDO; DNQ	IDO; 1R	DNQ						
2017	Did not qualify				GDT; 1R	EDM; DNQ	ADO; 2R	Did not qualify				EDT; 2R		
2018	DNQ		GDO; 2R	Did not qualify					EDM; 1R	Did not qualify				
2022	Did not qualify							DDC; 1R	Did not qualify					
2023	BSD; DNQ	EDO; 1R	Did not qualify/participate											
2024	BDO; DNP	DNQ		EDG; 1R	Did not qualify/participate									
2025	BDO; DNP	DNQ		GDG; 1R	Did not qualify/participate									

PDC Players Championships

Season	1	2	3	4	5	6	7	8	9	10	11	12	13	14	15	16	17	18	19	20	21	22	23	24	25	26	27	28	29	30
2024 (Note: Not a Tour card holder)	Did not participate								HIL; 1R	HIL; 1R	HIL; 1R	HIL; 1R	DNP					MIL; 2R	MIL; 1R	WIG; DNP		LEI; 1R	LEI; 1R	WIG; 1R	WIG; 1R	WIG; 1R	DNP			

Performance Table Legend
W	Won the tournament	F	Finalist	SF	Semifinalist	QF	Quarterfinalist	#R; RR; Prel.	Lost in # round Round-robin; Preliminary round	DQ	Disqualified
DNQ	Did not qualify	DNP	Did not participate	WD	Withdrew	NH	Tournament not held	#R; RR; Prel.	Lost in # round Round-robin; Preliminary round	NYF	Not yet founded
