= Ricky Williams (darts player) =

English darts player

Personal information
- Nickname: Tricky
- Born: 29 May 1989 (age 37) Portsmouth, Hampshire, England
- Home town: Portsmouth, Hampshire, England

Sport
- Sport: Darts
- Playing since: 2000
- Darts: 22g Own Make
- Laterality: Right-handed
- Walk-on music: "I Don't Like It, I Love It" by Flo Rida

Organisation (see split in darts)
- BDO: 2000-2004
- PDC: 2004–

PDC premier events – best performances
- UK Open: Last 96: 2007

Other tournament wins
- Tournament: Years
- Mill Rythe Darts Festival Malta Open: 2009; 2013

Ricky Williams (born 29 May 1989 from Portsmouth, Hampshire) is a professional English darts player who plays in Professional Darts Corporation events.

He won the Mill Rythe Darts Festival in 2009 and the Malta Open in 2013. He also won a PDC Tour Card in 2016.
