= 2022 World Series of Darts Finals =

2022 Jack's World Series of Darts Finals

Tournament information
- Dates: 16–18 September 2022
- Venue: AFAS Live
- Location: Amsterdam
- Country: Netherlands
- Organisation(s): PDC
- Format: Legs
- Prize fund: £300,000
- Winner's share: £70,000
- High checkout: 170 Danny Noppert; James Wade

Champion(s)
- Gerwyn Price

The 2022 Jack's World Series of Darts Finals was the eighth staging of the World Series of Darts Finals tournament, organised by the Professional Darts Corporation. The tournament took place at the AFAS Live, Amsterdam, Netherlands, from 16 to 18 September 2022. It featured a field of 24 players.

Jonny Clayton was the defending champion, after beating Dimitri Van den Bergh 11–6 in the 2021 final. However, he lost 8–11 to Dirk van Duijvenbode in the semi-finals.

Gerwyn Price won his second World Series Finals title, defeating van Duijvenbode 11–10 in the final.

== Prize money ==
The prize money remained the same as the previous year.

Position (no. of players)		Prize money (Total: £300,000)
Winner	(1)	£70,000
Runner-up	(1)	£30,000
Semi-finalists	(2)	£20,000
Quarter-finalists	(4)	£15,000
Last 16 (second round)	(8)	£7,500
Last 24 (first round)	(8)	£5,000

== Qualification ==
The top eight players from the six World Series events were seeded for this tournament.

Those events were:

- 2022 US Darts Masters
- 2022 Nordic Darts Masters
- 2022 Dutch Darts Masters
- 2022 Queensland Darts Masters
- 2022 New South Wales Darts Masters
- 2022 New Zealand Darts Masters

Eight additional players were invited by the PDC, with eight players qualifying from a qualifying event for tour card holders on August 6.

Top 8 On World Series Order of Merit
1. Dimitri Van den Bergh (second round)
2. Gerwyn Price (winner)
3. Michael Smith (quarter-finals)
4. Michael van Gerwen (quarter-finals)
5. Jonny Clayton (semi-finals)
6. James Wade (semi-finals)
7. Joe Cullen (quarter-finals)
8. Gary Anderson (second round)

Invited Players
- Peter Wright (second round)
- Dirk van Duijvenbode (runner-up)
- Simon Whitlock (first round)
- Fallon Sherrock (first round)
- Gordon Mathers (first round)
- Haupai Puha (first round)
- Leonard Gates (second round)
- Damon Heta (second round)

Tour Card Holder Qualifiers
- Matt Campbell (second round)
- Devon Petersen (first round)
- Ryan Joyce (quarter-finals)
- Jamie Hughes (first round)
- Danny Noppert (second round)
- Vincent van der Voort (first round)
- Dave Chisnall (second round)
- Danny Baggish (first round)

== Draw ==
The draw was made on 7 September 2022.

First round (best of 11 legs); 16 September
Q	Danny Baggish 87.56	5
Q	Ryan Joyce 91.66	6
Haupai Puha 84.70	5
Dirk van Duijvenbode 92.53	6
Gordon Mathers 91.25	3
Damon Heta 98.82	6
Simon Whitlock 90.87	4
Q	Danny Noppert 94.95	6
Q	Matt Campbell 95.47	6
Q	Vincent van der Voort 96.61	3
Q	Jamie Hughes 94.52	3
Q	Dave Chisnall 98.33	6
Fallon Sherrock 88.18	4
Peter Wright 103.52	6
Leonard Gates 86.22	6
Q	Devon Petersen 87.88	4

Second round (best of 11 legs); 17 September
1	Dimitri Van den Bergh 95.10	2
Q	Ryan Joyce 97.51	6
8	Gary Anderson 90.76	3
Dirk van Duijvenbode 92.63	6
4	Michael van Gerwen 96.80	6
Damon Heta 85.93	4
5	Jonny Clayton 104.39	6
Q	Danny Noppert 96.42	2
2	Gerwyn Price 95.48	6
Q	Matt Campbell 98.72	5
7	Joe Cullen 84.78	6
Q	Dave Chisnall 88.38	5
3	Michael Smith 107.40	6
Peter Wright 102.69	4
6	James Wade 87.80	6
Leonard Gates 88.62	4

Quarter-finals (best of 19 legs); 18 September
Q	Ryan Joyce 93.15	9
Dirk van Duijvenbode 91.61	10
4	Michael van Gerwen 95.53	7
5	Jonny Clayton 95.88	10
2	Gerwyn Price 98.95	10
7	Joe Cullen 89.60	8
3	Michael Smith 92.15	5
6	James Wade 92.44	10

Semi-finals (best of 21 legs); 18 September
Dirk van Duijvenbode 96.36	11
5	Jonny Clayton 93.43	8
2	Gerwyn Price 99.60	11
6	James Wade 95.70	9

Final (best of 21 legs); 18 September
Dirk van Duijvenbode 97.69	10
2	Gerwyn Price 100.14	11
