= 2022 Queensland Darts Masters =

Tournament information
- Dates: 12–13 August 2022
- Venue: Townsville Entertainment and Convention Centre
- Location: Townsville, Australia
- Organisation(s): Professional Darts Corporation (PDC)
- Format: Legs
- Prize fund: £60,000
- Winner's share: £20,000
- High checkout: 167 Gerwyn Price

Champion(s)
- Michael van Gerwen (NED)

The 2022 Queensland Darts Masters, known for sponsorship reasons as the 2022 PalmerBet Queensland Darts Masters, was the first staging of the tournament by the Professional Darts Corporation, and the fourth entry in the 2022 World Series of Darts. The tournament featured 16 players (eight 'elite' PDC players and eight regional qualifiers) and was held at the Townsville Entertainment and Convention Centre in Townsville, Australia on 12 to 13 August 2022.

Just before the tournament, it was announced that the winner and runner-up of this event (and the following New South Wales Darts Masters) would receive boomerang-style trophies in honour of Kyle Anderson, who died in 2021, with the best Oceanic player across the 3 Oceanic World Series events (Queensland, New South Wales and New Zealand) receiving the Kyle Anderson Memorial Trophy. Gordon Mathers would win this trophy, owing to his run to the semi-finals in this tournament.

Michael van Gerwen won his 17th World Series title after defeating Gerwyn Price 8–5 in the final.

== Prize money ==
The total prize fund remained at £60,000.

Position (no. of players)		Prize money (Total: £60,000)
Winner	(1)	£20,000
Runner-up	(1)	£10,000
Semi-finalists	(2)	£5,000
Quarter-finalists	(4)	£2,500
First round	(8)	£1,250

== Qualifiers ==
The PDC announced 6 of the 8 players who would be their representatives at the event on 11 April 2022, including Fallon Sherrock, who was denied her chance to appear on the 2020 World Series of Darts circuit, owing to the COVID-19 pandemic. On 30 May 2022, it was announced that Jonny Clayton and Joe Cullen would complete the field of PDC representatives.

On 27 July, it was announced that Peter Wright had withdrawn from the three Oceania events for medical reasons, and so was replaced by the current World Series Order of Merit leader Dimitri Van den Bergh.

The seedings were based on the World Series Order of Merit following the first 3 events.

1. Dimitri Van den Bergh (quarter-finals)
2. Michael Smith (quarter-finals)
3. James Wade (first round)
4. Michael van Gerwen (champion)
5. Gerwyn Price (runner-up)
6. Fallon Sherrock (first round)
7. Jonny Clayton (first round)
8. Joe Cullen (semi-finals)

The Oceanic qualifiers consisted of their three PDC Tour Card holders (Damon Heta, Simon Whitlock and Gordon Mathers), plus the four Australian players who won the DPA qualifiers, along with one New Zealand player from the DPNZ qualifier.

Qualification	Player
PDC Tour Card Holders	Damon Heta (first round)
PDC Tour Card Holders	Simon Whitlock (quarter-finals)
PDC Tour Card Holders	Gordon Mathers (semi-finals)
DPA Qualifiers	Bailey Marsh (first round)
DPA Qualifiers	Koha Kokiri (first round)
DPA Qualifiers	Dave Marland (first round)
DPA Qualifiers	Joe Comito (first round)
DPNZ Qualifier	Haupai Puha (quarter-finals)

== Draw ==
First round (best of 11 legs); 12 August
1	Dimitri Van den Bergh 93.24	6
Koha Kokiri 85.93	2
Joe Cullen 108.65	6
Dave Marland 78.52	0
4	Michael van Gerwen 85.97	6
Bailey Marsh 84.64	5
Jonny Clayton 87.15	2
Haupai Puha 95.59	6
2	Michael Smith 104.86	6
Joe Comito 75.41	0
Fallon Sherrock 73.42	3
Gordon Mathers 79.64	6
3	James Wade 91.97	2
Simon Whitlock 96.13	6
Gerwyn Price 98.60	6
Damon Heta 98.06	5

Quarter-finals (best of 11 legs); 13 August
1	Dimitri Van den Bergh 102.27	4
Joe Cullen 102.74	6
4	Michael van Gerwen 91.76	6
Haupai Puha 86.51	1
2	Michael Smith 85.83	4
Gordon Mathers 85.60	6
Simon Whitlock 86.63	3
Gerwyn Price 92.96	6

Semi-finals (best of 13 legs); 13 August
Joe Cullen 96.84	5
4	Michael van Gerwen 92.98	7
Gordon Mathers 91.79	1
Gerwyn Price 98.38	7

Final (best of 15 legs); 13 August
4	Michael van Gerwen 99.87	8
Gerwyn Price 89.17	5
