= 2022 New South Wales Darts Masters =

2022 PalmerBet New South Wales Darts Masters

Tournament information
- Dates: 19–20 August 2022
- Venue: WIN Entertainment Centre
- Location: Wollongong, Australia
- Organisation(s): Professional Darts Corporation (PDC)
- Format: Legs
- Prize fund: £60,000
- Winner's share: £20,000
- High checkout: 160 Jonny Clayton

Champion(s)
- Jonny Clayton (WAL)

The 2022 PalmerBet New South Wales Darts Masters was the first staging of the tournament by the Professional Darts Corporation, and the fifth entry in the 2022 World Series of Darts. The tournament featured 16 players (eight PDC players and eight regional qualifiers) and was held at the WIN Entertainment Centre in Wollongong, Australia on 19 to 20 August 2022.

Just before the tournament, it was announced that the winner and runner-up of this event (and the preceding Queensland Darts Masters) will receive boomerang-style trophies in honour of Kyle Anderson, who died in 2021, with the best Oceanic player across the 3 Oceanic World Series events (Queensland, New South Wales and New Zealand) receiving the Kyle Anderson Memorial Trophy.

Jonny Clayton won his second World Series title after defeating James Wade 8–1 in the final.

== Prize money ==
The total prize fund remained at £60,000.

Position (no. of players)		Prize money (Total: £60,000)
Winner	(1)	£20,000
Runner-up	(1)	£10,000
Semi-finalists	(2)	£5,000
Quarter-finalists	(4)	£2,500
First round	(8)	£1,250

== Qualifiers ==
The PDC announced 6 of the 8 players who would be their representatives at the event on 11 April 2022, including Fallon Sherrock, who was denied her chance to appear on the 2020 World Series of Darts circuit, owing to the COVID-19 pandemic. On 30 May 2022, it was announced that Jonny Clayton and Joe Cullen would complete the field of PDC representatives.

On 27 July, it was announced that Peter Wright had withdrawn from the three Oceania events for medical reasons, and so was replaced by the current World Series Order of Merit leader Dimitri Van den Bergh.

The seedings were based on the World Series Order of Merit following the first 4 events.

1. Dimitri Van den Bergh (quarter-finals)
2. Michael van Gerwen (first round)
3. Michael Smith (quarter-finals)
4. Gerwyn Price (semi-finals)
5. James Wade (runner-up)
6. Fallon Sherrock (quarter-finals)
7. Joe Cullen (semi-finals)
8. Jonny Clayton (champion)

The Oceanic qualifiers consisted of their three PDC Tour Card holders (Damon Heta, Simon Whitlock and Gordon Mathers), plus the four Australian players who won the DPA qualifiers, along with one New Zealand player from the DPNZ qualifier.

Qualification	Player
PDC Tour Card Holders	Damon Heta (first round)
PDC Tour Card Holders	Simon Whitlock (quarter-finals)
PDC Tour Card Holders	Gordon Mathers (first round)
DPA Qualifiers	Dave Marland (first round)
DPA Qualifiers	Koha Kokiri (first round)
DPA Qualifiers	Raymond O'Donnell (first round)
DPA Qualifiers	Mal Cuming (first round)
DPNZ Qualifier	Haupai Puha (first round)

== Draw ==
First round (best of 11 legs); 19 August
1	Dimitri Van den Bergh 90.80	6
Raymond O'Donnell 85.73	3
James Wade 91.81	6
Gordon Mathers 79.73	3
4	Gerwyn Price 104.86	6
Koha Kokiri 83.39	0
Fallon Sherrock 80.69	6
Mal Cuming 77.59	5
2	Michael van Gerwen 101.50	5
Simon Whitlock 97.41	6
Joe Cullen 91.72	6
Dave Marland 86.21	3
3	Michael Smith 106.33	6
Damon Heta 96.36	5
Jonny Clayton 95.13	6
Haupai Puha 88.18	1

Quarter-finals (best of 11 legs); 20 August
1	Dimitri Van den Bergh 88.50	0
James Wade 94.93	6
4	Gerwyn Price 109.98	6
Fallon Sherrock 81.54	0
Simon Whitlock 84.28	2
Joe Cullen 89.77	6
3	Michael Smith 99.15	4
Jonny Clayton 91.03	6

Semi-finals (best of 13 legs); 20 August
James Wade 93.25	7
4	Gerwyn Price 94.58	3
Joe Cullen 94.55	1
Jonny Clayton 96.45	7

Final (best of 15 legs); 20 August
James Wade 84.93	1
Jonny Clayton 94.50	8
