= 2023 New South Wales Darts Masters =

2023 PalmerBet New South Wales Darts Masters

Tournament information
- Dates: 11–12 August 2023
- Venue: WIN Entertainment Centre
- Location: Townsville, Australia
- Organisation(s): Professional Darts Corporation (PDC)
- Format: Legs
- Prize fund: £60,000
- Winner's share: £20,000
- High checkout: 160 Simon Whitlock

Champion(s)
- Rob Cross (ENG)

The 2023 PalmerBet New South Wales Darts Masters was the second staging of the tournament by the Professional Darts Corporation, and the sixth entry in the 2023 World Series of Darts.

The tournament featured 16 players (eight PDC players and eight regional qualifiers) and was held at the WIN Entertainment Centre in Wollongong, Australia on 11–12 August 2023.

Rob Cross won his second World Series title in as many weeks, and his third in all, defeating Damon Heta 8–1 in the final.

== Players ==
The PDC invited eight players, while there were eight Oceanic representatives. Jonny Clayton, who had been initially invited, withdrew for personal reasons; he was replaced as an invitee by Damon Heta, who had previously been listed as an Oceanic representative, was moved to the PDC list; Harley Kemp was added as an Oceanic representative.

The PDC representatives were:

- Michael Smith
- Peter Wright
- Gerwyn Price
- Nathan Aspinall
- Rob Cross
- Danny Noppert
- Damon Heta
- Dimitri Van den Bergh

The Oceanic representatives were:

| Qualification | Player |
|---|---|
| PDC Tour Card Holder | Simon Whitlock |
| DartPlayers Australia #1 | Darren Penhall |
| DartPlayers Australia #2 | Harley Kemp |
| DartPlayers Australia #3 | Dave Marland |
| DartPlayers Australia #4 | Mal Cuming |
| DartPlayers Australian Qualifier | John Hurring |
| DartPlayers Australian Qualifier | Brenton Lloyd |
| DartPlayers Australian Qualifier | Joe Comito |

== Prize money ==
The total prize fund remained at £60,000.

| Position (no. of players) | | Prize money (Total: £60,000) |
|---|---|---|
| Winner | (1) | £20,000 |
| Runner-up | (1) | £10,000 |
| Semi-finalists | (2) | £5,000 |
| Quarter-finalists | (4) | £2,500 |
| First round | (8) | £1,250 |

== Draw ==
First round (best of 11 legs); 11 August
1 | Gerwyn Price 98.80 | 6
Harley Kemp 84.00 | 2
Damon Heta 106.09 | 6
Joe Comito 73.50 | 0
4 | Dimitri Van den Bergh 82.73 | 6
Dave Marland 72.89 | 0
Nathan Aspinall 91.98 | 5
Simon Whitlock 99.63 | 6
2 | Michael Smith 93.96 | 6
Mal Cuming 78.17 | 2
Peter Wright 93.02 | 6
Darren Penhall 89.56 | 2
3 | Rob Cross 98.02 | 6
John Hurring 91.67 | 2
Danny Noppert 94.04 | 6
Brenton Lloyd 85.45 | 3

Quarter-finals (best of 11 legs); 12 August
1 | Gerwyn Price 91.10 | 3
Damon Heta 89.79 | 6
4 | Dimitri Van den Bergh 97.81 | 6
Simon Whitlock 87.53 | 4
2 | Michael Smith 91.29 | 3
Peter Wright 88.69 | 6
3 | Rob Cross 95.32 | 6
Danny Noppert 100.68 | 4

Semi-finals (best of 13 legs); 12 August
Damon Heta 93.20 | 7
4 | Dimitri Van den Bergh 90.47 | 6
Peter Wright 90.84 | 0
3 | Rob Cross 109.59 | 7

Final (best of 15 legs); 12 August
Damon Heta 83.53 | 1
3 | Rob Cross 91.29 | 8
