= Mal Cuming =

Australian darts player

Personal information
- Full name: Malcolm Cuming
- Nickname: "The Bull"
- Born: 23 January 1976 (age 50) Melbourne, Australia
- Home town: Perth, Australia

Sport
- Sport: Darts
- Playing since: 1996
- Darts: 23g Loxley Signature
- Laterality: Right-handed
- Walk-on music: "We Will Rock You" by Queen

Organisation (see split in darts)
- BDO: 2014–2020
- PDC: 2020–

WDF major events – best performances
- World Championship: Last 40: 2019

PDC premier events – best performances
- World Championship: Last 96: 2023

Other tournament wins
- Years
Geelong Dart Club Classic	2018
Victorian Easter Classic	2018
DPA Pro Tour Event	2020, 2023 (x3)
DPA Oceanic Masters	2022

Malcolm Cuming (born 23 January 1976) is an Australian professional darts player playing in Professional Darts Corporation (PDC) events. He qualified for the 2019 BDO World Darts Championship.

== Career ==
In 2018, Cuming qualified for the 2019 BDO World Darts Championship as the Australian qualifier, he finished second in the Darts Australia rankings behind Justin Thompson, who already qualified via the BDO rankings. He lost to Justin Thompson in the preliminary round.

== World Championship results ==
=== BDO World Championship ===
- 2019: Preliminary round (lost to Justin Thompson 0–3) (sets)

=== PDC World Championship ===
- 2023: First round (lost to Alan Soutar 0–3)

== Performance timeline ==
=== BDO ===
Tournament	2019
BDO Ranked televised events
World Championship	Prel.

=== PDC ===
Tournament	2023	2027
PDC Ranked televised events
World Championship	1R	

==== World Series ====
Tournament	2022	2023	2026
New South Wales Masters	1R	1R	NH
Australian Masters	Not held		1R
