= Dimitri Van den Bergh =

Belgian darts player (born 1994)

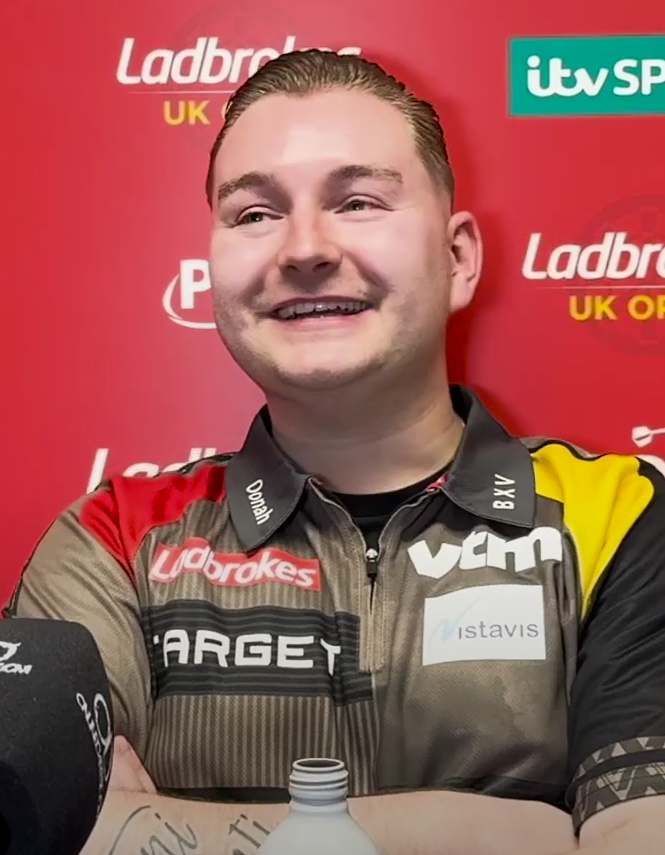
- Van den Bergh at the 2025 UK Open

Personal information
- Full name: Dimitri Barbara P. Van den Bergh
- Nickname: "The Dreammaker"
- Born: 8 July 1994 (age 32) Antwerp, Belgium

Sport
- Sport: Darts
- Darts: 22g Target Signature Gen 2
- Laterality: Right-handed
- Walk-on music: "Play Hard" by David Guetta ft. Ne-Yo & Akon

Organisation (see split in darts)
- BDO: 2012–2013
- PDC: 2013–present (Tour Card: 2015–present)
- Current world ranking: (PDC) 60 ▼1 (5 November 2026)

WDF major events – best performances
- World Masters: Last 256: 2013

PDC premier events – best performances
- World Championship: Semi-final: 2023
- World Matchplay: Winner (1): 2020
- World Grand Prix: Semi-final: 2024
- UK Open: Winner (1): 2024
- Grand Slam: Semi-final: 2020
- European Championship: Last 16: 2022
- Premier League: 5th: 2021
- PC Finals: Last 16: 2022, 2023
- Masters: Semi-final: 2024, 2025
- World Series Finals: Runner-up: 2021

Other tournament wins
- Years
PDC Players Championships (×3)	2021 (×2); 2024 (×1)
World Series of Darts (×2)
Dutch Darts Masters	2022
Nordic Darts Masters	2022
Youth events
PDC World Youth Championship (×2)	2017; 2018
PDC Development Tour (×12)	2013 (×1); 2014 (×3); 2015 (×2); 2016 (×1); 2017 (×3); 2018 (×2)
Medal record
Men's Darts
Representing Belgium
EDF European Ch'ship
Gold medal – first place	2017 Podčetrtek	Men's singles
Silver medal – second place	2017 Podčetrtek	Men's cricket

Dimitri Barbara P. Van den Bergh (born 8 July 1994) is a Belgian professional darts player who competes in Professional Darts Corporation (PDC) events, where he reached a peak ranking of world number five in 2021. Nicknamed "the Dreammaker", Van den Bergh has won two PDC major titles – the World Matchplay and the UK Open. He defeated Gary Anderson 18–10 in the 2020 World Matchplay final, and defeated Luke Humphries 11–10 in the 2024 UK Open final. He is a one-time World Championship semi-finalist, reaching the last four at the 2023 PDC World Championship. Van den Bergh has won a total of 7 PDC titles in his professional career.

In his youth career, Van den Bergh won the PDC World Youth Championship in both 2017 and 2018, and twelve PDC Development Tours, making him one of the most successful players in the history of the PDC's youth system.

== Career ==
=== 2013 ===
In 2013, Van den Bergh won the British Teenage Open by beating Billy Longshaw 3–0 in the final. Two months later he claimed the 16th PDC Challenge Tour event of the year by whitewashing Charlie Tate 4–0.

=== 2014 ===
In 2014, he entered Q School in an attempt to earn a PDC Tour Card, but he couldn't advance beyond the last 64 in any of the four days. However, he was granted PDPA Associate Member status for participating which gave him entry into UK Open and European tour qualifiers. Van den Bergh qualified for the first European Tour event, the German Darts Championship and lost 6–2 in the first round against Ronnie Baxter despite averaging 102.94. Van den Bergh won three youth tour titles during the year and also reached the last 16 of the Under-21 World Championship, where he lost 6–3 to Robinson. He finished top of the Youth Tour Order of Merit which earned him a two-year card for the main PDC tour.

=== 2015 ===
Van den Bergh claimed two Development Tour titles in 2015. He reached the last 16 of a PDC event for the first time at the third Players Championship event, but lost 6–5 to Mensur Suljović. Van den Bergh was also knocked out in the second round of three European Tour events. He qualified for the inaugural World Series of Darts Finals but was beaten 6–3 by Max Hopp in the first round in what was Van den Bergh's televised debut.

=== 2016 ===
He qualified for the 2016 World Championship through the European Pro Tour Order of Merit and danced on to the stage before his first round encounter with Ian White. Van den Bergh missed four darts for the first set, but went on to win 3–1 taking out four ton-plus finishes during the match. He lost 4–2 to Benito van de Pas in the following round. Van den Bergh won the 14th Development Tour event by overcoming Steve Lennon 4–2. At the 15th Players Championship tournament Van den Bergh reached the semi-finals of a main tour event for the first time with wins over Devon Petersen, Jan Dekker, Ronny Huybrechts, Chris Dobey and Cristo Reyes, but he lost 6–2 to Michael van Gerwen. In the semi-finals of the World Youth Championship, Van den Bergh was beaten 6–3 by Corey Cadby. He won a place at the Grand Slam by coming through the qualifying event and edged his first group match 5–4 over Gerwyn Price. Van den Bergh was then beaten 5–4 by Robert Thornton, but after defeating Scott Waites 5–4 in the final group game it meant he was tied with Thornton on points and leg difference. This meant a nine-dart shoot-out was required to decide who would advance to the knock-out stage and Thornton won by 345 points to 340.

=== 2017 ===
Van den Bergh's first round match at the 2017 World Championship went to a deciding set and was on throw, but he missed two darts at double eight to send it to a tie-break, allowing Cristo Reyes to step in and win 3–2. At the end of the year, Van den Bergh became World Youth Champion by defeating Josh Payne 6–3 in the final. He would defend his title the following year by defeating Germany's Martin Schindler in the final.

=== 2018 ===
At the 2018 PDC World Darts Championship, Van den Bergh reached the quarter-finals for the first time, where he lost 5–4 to eventual champion Rob Cross in a tight match. Van den Bergh's debut in the World Series of Darts came with a stellar performance in the 2018 German Darts Masters where he lost in the final to Mensur Suljović 2–8 after defeating Michael van Gerwen 8–3 in the quarter-final and Gary Anderson 8–7 in the semi-final.

At the Grand Slam, Van den Bergh hit his first televised nine-dart leg of his career against Grand Slam of Darts against Stephen Bunting.

=== 2019 ===
At the 2019 PDC World Darts Championship, Van den Bergh lost 4–1 to Luke Humphries in the third round. Following Gary Anderson's withdrawal from the 2019 Premier League, Van den Bergh was selected as one of nine 'contenders' to replace him. He played a one-off match against James Wade on night eight in Rotterdam, recording a 6–6 draw. Van den Bergh reached two Players Championship Finals, but lost in both to Glen Durrant and Krzysztof Ratajski respectively. Later in the year, he would qualify for the World Grand Prix for the first time, but he let a 1–0 lead slip and eventually lost 2–1 to Mervyn King. In the 2020 PDC World Darts Championship, Van den Bergh scored high averages in defeating Josh Payne, Luke Woodhouse and Adrian Lewis, before losing to Nathan Aspinall in the quarter-finals.

=== 2020 ===
At the 2020 PDC World Darts Championship, Van den Bergh reached the quarter-finals for the second time, there he lost to Nathan Aspinall 5–3. In March he reached the quarter-finals of the UK Open before succumbing to Gerwyn Price. After spending the whole first COVID-19 pandemic lockdown in the UK, staying at Peter Wright's house, Van den Bergh pulled off the biggest achievement of his career by winning the 2020 World Matchplay on his debut, after defeating Nathan Aspinall, Joe Cullen, Adrian Lewis, Glen Durrant and Gary Anderson to win the £115,000 top prize, and move him into the top 10 in the world for the first time.

=== 2021 ===
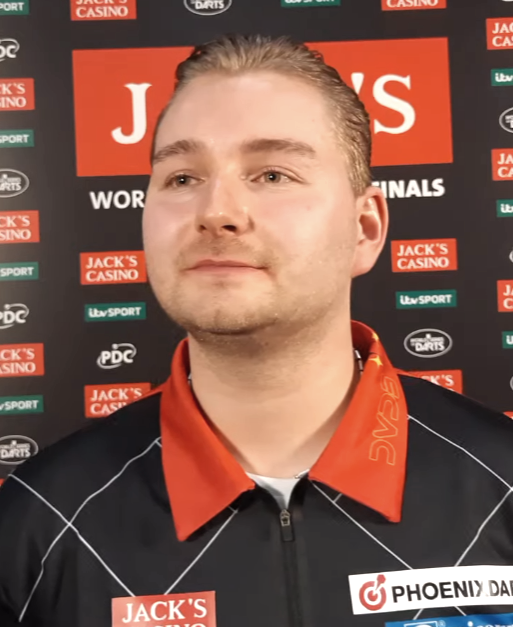
Van den Bergh in 2021

At the 2021 PDC World Darts Championship, Van den Bergh lost 4–2 in the fourth round to Dave Chisnall. In defence of his World Matchplay title, he reached the final, before losing 18–9 to Peter Wright.

Van den Bergh qualified for the 2021 Nordic Darts Masters where he defeated Sweden's Johan Engström 6–4 in the first round, and defeated Gary Anderson 10–8 in the quarter finals before he lost to Fallon Sherrock 11–10 in the semi-finals.

Van den Bergh was drawn in Group D against Stephen Bunting, Ryan Joyce and Rowby-John Rodriguez in the Grand Slam of Darts. Unfortunately just two days before the tournament started, he was forced to withdraw after testing positive for COVID-19. He was replaced by Chris Dobey, as he was the next player on the qualifying criteria list.

=== 2022 ===
At the 2022 PDC World Darts Championship, Van den Bergh suffered a shock second round defeat to Florian Hempel. At the Masters he reached the second round, defeating Ian White 6–1 in round 1 with a 105.31 average, but then losing 10–9 to Jonny Clayton in round 2. In June 2022, Van den Bergh won the 2022 Nordic Darts Masters, defeating Benjamin Drue Reus, Gerwyn Price and Michael Smith en route to a final against Gary Anderson which the Belgian won 11–4. Van den Bergh reached the semi-finals at the World Matchplay, where he lost to the eventual winner Michael van Gerwen 17–14.

=== 2023 ===
At the 2023 PDC World Championship, Van den Bergh reached the quarterfinals for the third time and was finally able to progress further, seeing off Jonny Clayton 5–3, and as a result became the first Belgian player to reach the semi-finals of a PDC World Championship, before being beaten 6–0 by Michael van Gerwen. In the same year, he and Kim Huybrechts represented Belgium on the World Cup of Darts. However, the two darters seemed to ignore each other during their first game. According to several media, the two players were having an unknown conflict, which they did not solve before the match started. Van den Bergh and Huybrechts did not really explain their behaviour after the game.

=== 2024 ===
At the 2024 PDC World Darts Championship Van den Bergh was defeated in the second round by Florian Hempel 2–3, despite winning the first two sets, Van den Bergh missed 3 match darts. The match was a repeat of the 2022 second-round tie, which Hempel also won.

Van den Bergh won his second major title at the 2024 UK Open, beating World Champion Luke Humphries in a deciding leg in the final.

Van den Bergh reached the quarter-finals at the 2024 World Matchplay, where he threw a nine-dart leg in his first round victory over Martin Schindler, before losing to eventual champion Luke Humphries.

=== 2025 ===
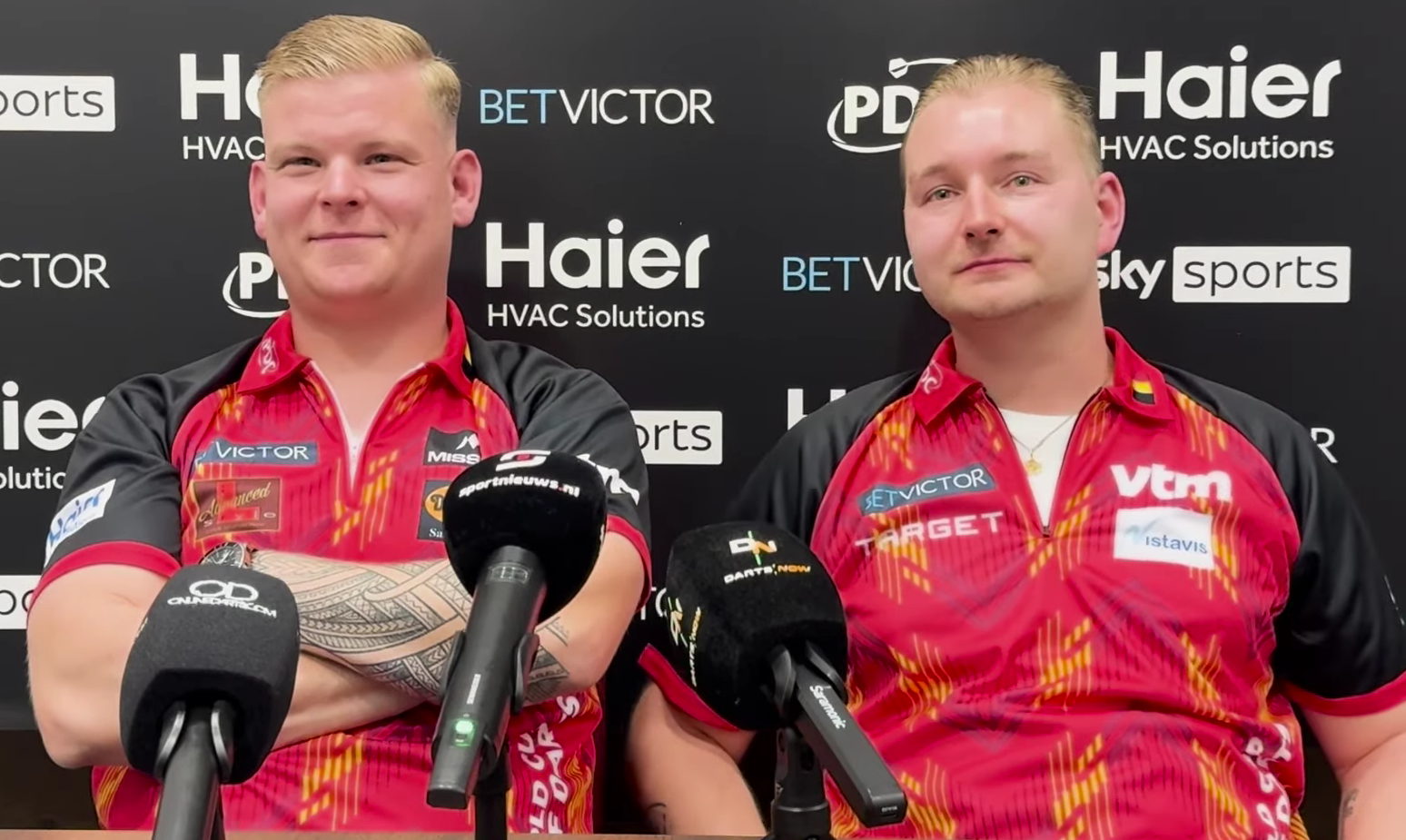
Van den Bergh (right) and his new Belgian teammate Mike De Decker at the 2025 PDC World Cup of Darts

At the 2025 PDC World Darts Championship Van den Bergh was knocked out of the third round of the tournament to Callan Rydz 4–0. During the 2025 PDC World Masters, Van den Bergh hit a third televised nine-dart finish in his 4–3 second round victory over Michael van Gerwen. He was defeated by Jonny Clayton in the semi-finals. Van den Bergh then took a break from darts for two months as a mental reset, starting at the beginning of April after he withdrew from a Players Championship event. He returned to competition at the World Cup of Darts, where he partnered Mike De Decker. They started off promising with a 4–1 win over the Latvian team of Madars Razma and Valters Melderis, but were shockingly eliminated from the tournament after losing to the Philippines team of Lourence Ilagan and Paolo Nebrida 4–3 despite leading 3–0 and on the verge of qualifying for the round of 16 themselves.

=== 2026 ===
At the 2026 PDC World Darts Championship Van den Bergh was eliminated in the first round for the first time since the 2017 tournament to Scottish player Darren Beveridge 3–0. Van den Bergh once again partnered Mike De Decker at the World Cup of Darts.

== World Championship performances ==
=== PDC World Championship ===
- 2016: Second round (lost to Benito van de Pas 2–4)
- 2017: First round (lost to Cristo Reyes 2–3)
- 2018: Quarter-finals (lost to Rob Cross 4–5)
- 2019: Third round (lost to Luke Humphries 1–4)
- 2020: Quarter-finals (lost to Nathan Aspinall 3–5)
- 2021: Fourth round (lost to Dave Chisnall 2–4)
- 2022: Second round (lost to Florian Hempel 1–3)
- 2023: Semi-finals (lost to Michael van Gerwen 0–6)
- 2024: Second round (lost to Florian Hempel 2–3)
- 2025: Third round (lost to Callan Rydz 0–4)
- 2026: First round (lost to Darren Beveridge 0–3)

== Career finals ==
=== PDC major finals: 4 (2 titles) ===
Legend
World Matchplay (1–1)
UK Open (1–0)
World Series Finals (0–1)

Outcome	No.	Year	Championship	Opponent in the final	Score (Note: (l) = score in legs, (s) = score in sets.)
Winner	1.	2020	World Matchplay	Gary Anderson	18–10 (l)
Runner-up	1.	2021	World Matchplay	Peter Wright	9–18 (l)
Runner-up	2.	2021	World Series Finals	Jonny Clayton	6–11 (l)
Winner	2.	2024	UK Open	Luke Humphries	11–10 (l)

=== PDC world series finals: 4 (2 titles) ===
Legend
World Series of Darts (2–2)

Outcome	No.	Year	Championship	Opponent in the final	Score
Runner-up	1.	2018	German Masters	Mensur Suljović	2–8 (l)
Winner	1.	2022	Nordic Masters	Gary Anderson	11–5 (l)
Winner	2.	2022	Dutch Masters	Dirk van Duijvenbode	8–2 (l)
Runner-up	2.	2023	Poland Masters	Michael van Gerwen	3–8 (l)

== Performance timeline ==
Tournament	2014	2015	2016	2017	2018	2019	2020	2021	2022	2023	2024	2025	2026
PDC Ranked televised events
World Championship	DNQ		2R	1R	QF	3R	QF	4R	2R	SF	2R	3R	1R
World Masters (Note: A non-ranked event until 2025)	Did not qualify							1R	2R	1R	SF	SF	Prel.
UK Open	Did not qualify				1R	6R	QF	4R	5R	SF	W	6R	4R
World Matchplay	Did not qualify						W	F	SF	2R	QF	DNQ	
World Grand Prix	Did not qualify					1R	2R	1R	QF	1R	SF	DNQ	
European Championship	Did not qualify			1R	DNQ	1R	DNQ		2R	1R	Did not qualify		
Grand Slam	DNQ		RR	DNQ	QF	RR	SF	WD	DNQ		2R	DNQ	
Players Championship Finals	DNQ		2R	DNQ	1R	1R	1R	2R	3R	3R	1R	DNQ	
PDC Non-ranked televised events
Premier League	Did not participate					C	DNP	5th	DNP	6th	DNP		
World Cup	Did not participate				SF	QF	SF	2R	QF	SF	SF	RR	2R
World Series Finals	DNQ	1R	DNQ	QF	1R	DNQ	1R	F	2R	QF	1R	DNQ	DNP
World Youth Championship	3R	1R	SF	W	W	Did not participate							
Career statistics
Year-end ranking	NR	59	51	39	33	29	9	9	11	14	11	25	

=== PDC European Tour ===
Season	1	2	3	4	5	6	7	8	9	10	11	12	13	14	15
2014	GDC; 1R	DDM; 2R	GDM; DNQ	ADO; DNQ	GDT; 2R	EDO; DNQ	EDG; DNQ	EDT; 2R							
2015	GDC; DNQ	GDT; 2R	GDM; DNQ	DDM; 1R	IDO; DNQ	EDO; 2R	EDT; DNQ	EDM; 2R	EDG; DNQ						
2016	DDM; 1R	GDM; 1R	GDT; DNQ	EDM; DNQ	ADO; 2R	EDO; 2R	IDO; DNQ	EDT; 2R	EDG; DNQ	GDC; DNQ					
2017	GDC; 2R	GDM; DNQ	GDO; 3R	EDG; 2R	GDT; 3R	EDM; DNQ	ADO; 1R	EDO; 3R	DDM; DNQ	GDG; DNQ	IDO; 1R	EDT; 1R			
2018	EDO; 1R	GDG; DNQ	GDO; 2R	ADO; 3R	EDG; 1R	Did not qualify									
2019	EDO; 3R	GDC; 2R	GDG; DNQ	GDO; 2R	ADO; DNQ	EDG; 2R	DNQ			ADC; 2R	EDM; DNQ	IDO; 2R	GDT; 2R		
2020	BDC; 2R	DNQ													
2022	IDO; QF	GDC; SF	GDG; 2R	ADO; 2R	EDO; F	CDO; 3R	EDG; 2R	DDC; 2R	EDM; 3R	HDT; 2R	GDO; F	BDO; 2R	GDT; 2R		
2023	BSD; 3R	EDO; 3R	IDO; 2R	GDG; 2R	ADO; DNQ	DDC; 2R	BDO; 2R	CDO; 3R	EDG; 2R	EDM; 3R	DNQ				
2024	BDO; 1R	GDG; 2R	IDO; 2R	EDG; WD	ADO; 2R	BSD; 1R	DDC; 3R	EDO; 2R	GDC; 1R	FDT; 1R	HDT; 1R	SDT; 1R	CDO; 1R		
2025	BDO; 2R	EDT; 2R	IDO; 3R	GDG; WD	ADO; WD	Did not participate/qualify									
2026	Did not qualify							BSD; 2R	Did not participate/qualify						

=== PDC World Series of Darts ===
Tournament	2021	2022	2023	2024	2025
Nordic Masters	SF	W	QF	QF	DNP
Dutch Masters	NH	W	NH	1R	1R
Queensland Masters	NH	QF	NH		
New South Wales Masters	NH	QF	1R	NH	
New Zealand Masters	NH	SF	SF	QF	NH
Bahrain Masters	NH		QF	DNP	
Poland Masters	NH		F	DNP	
US Masters	NH	DNP	QF	DNP	
Australian Masters	NH			SF	DNP

=== PDC Players Championships ===
Season	1	2	3	4	5	6	7	8	9	10	11	12	13	14	15	16	17	18	19	20	21	22	23	24	25	26	27	28	29	30	31	32	33	34
2015	BAR; 1R	BAR; 1R	BAR; 4R	BAR; 1R	BAR; 2R	COV; 2R	COV; 1R	COV; 2R	CRA; 1R	CRA; 3R	BAR; 2R	BAR; 1R	WIG; 2R	WIG; 3R	BAR; 1R	BAR; 1R	DUB; 1R	DUB; 1R	COV; 2R	COV; 1R														
2016	BAR; 3R	BAR; 1R	BAR; 2R	BAR; 1R	BAR; 1R	BAR; 1R	BAR; 1R	COV; 2R	COV; 2R	BAR; 1R	BAR; 2R	BAR; 1R	BAR; 3R	BAR; 1R	BAR; SF	BAR; 2R	DUB; 1R	DUB; 3R	BAR; 1R	BAR; 1R														
2017	BAR; 1R	BAR; 1R	BAR; 2R	BAR; 1R	MIL; 4R	MIL; 2R	BAR; 2R	BAR; 1R	WIG; 3R	WIG; 1R	MIL; 2R	MIL; 1R	WIG; 1R	WIG; 2R	BAR; QF	BAR; 1R	BAR; 2R	BAR; 2R	DUB; 2R	DUB; 1R	BAR; 1R	BAR; 1R												
2018	BAR; 1R	BAR; 2R	BAR; 2R	BAR; 3R	MIL; 2R	MIL; QF	BAR; 1R	BAR; 2R	WIG; 1R	WIG; 1R	MIL; 2R	MIL; 2R	WIG; 1R	WIG; QF	BAR; 2R	BAR; 2R	BAR; 1R	BAR; 2R	DUB; 1R	DUB; 1R	BAR; 4R	BAR; 1R												
2019	WIG; 1R	WIG; 1R	WIG; 4R	WIG; F	BAR; 1R	BAR; 1R	WIG; 1R	WIG; 3R	BAR; 2R	BAR; 1R	BAR; 1R	BAR; 2R	BAR; 1R	BAR; 1R	BAR; 2R	BAR; 1R	WIG; QF	WIG; SF	BAR; 3R	BAR; 4R	HIL; F	HIL; 1R	BAR; 3R	BAR; 2R	BAR; 1R	BAR; 2R	DUB; 1R	DUB; 2R	BAR; 1R	BAR; 2R				
2020	BAR; 1R	BAR; 1R	WIG; 1R	WIG; 2R	WIG; 4R	WIG; 1R	BAR; 1R	BAR; 2R	MIL; 1R	MIL; 1R	MIL; 4R	MIL; 3R	MIL; 1R	NIE; 3R	NIE; 3R	NIE; 1R	NIE; 1R	NIE; 4R	COV; 4R	COV; 1R	COV; 2R	COV; 1R	COV; 2R											
2021	BOL; 1R	BOL; 1R	BOL; 2R	BOL; 1R	MIL; 2R	MIL; 1R	MIL; 2R	MIL; 1R	NIE; SF	NIE; 4R	NIE; 2R	NIE; W	MIL; 1R	MIL; QF	MIL; 1R	MIL; 3R	COV; F	COV; 1R	COV; SF	COV; 4R	BAR; 2R	BAR; SF	BAR; 1R	BAR; W	BAR; 2R	BAR; 1R	BAR; 1R	BAR; 1R	BAR; 1R	BAR; 1R				
2022	BAR; 3R	BAR; 1R	WIG; 2R	WIG; F	BAR; SF	BAR; 1R	NIE; 1R	NIE; DNP	BAR; 2R	BAR; 4R	BAR; 2R	BAR; 3R	BAR; 2R	WIG; 2R	WIG; 1R	NIE; 4R	NIE; 1R	BAR; 3R	BAR; 3R	BAR; 2R	BAR; 2R	BAR; QF	BAR; 1R	BAR; QF	BAR; 1R	BAR; 1R	BAR; 1R	BAR; 1R	BAR; 2R	BAR; 1R				
2023	BAR; 3R	BAR; 4R	BAR; 1R	BAR; 4R	BAR; 4R	BAR; 1R	HIL; QF	HIL; 4R	WIG; 2R	WIG; SF	LEI; 3R	LEI; 4R	HIL; 3R	HIL; 1R	LEI; 2R	LEI; 3R	HIL; 2R	HIL; 1R	BAR; 2R	BAR; 1R	BAR; 1R	BAR; QF	BAR; 2R	BAR; 1R	BAR; 3R	BAR; 4R	BAR; 2R	BAR; 2R	BAR; 1R	BAR; 1R				
2024	WIG; 1R	WIG; 1R	LEI; 3R	LEI; 2R	HIL; 2R	HIL; 1R	LEI; 1R	LEI; 1R	HIL; 1R	HIL; 1R	HIL; 1R	HIL; W	MIL; 1R	MIL; 1R	MIL; 2R	MIL; 1R	MIL; 2R	MIL; 1R	MIL; 4R	WIG; 2R	WIG; 1R	MIL; 1R	MIL; 1R	WIG; 3R	WIG; 2R	WIG; 1R	WIG; 1R	WIG; 1R	LEI; DNP					
2025	WIG; 3R	WIG; 1R	ROS; DNP		LEI; 1R	LEI; 1R	HIL; 1R	HIL; 1R	LEI; 2R	LEI; 2R	LEI; 1R	LEI; 1R	Did not participate				LEI; 4R	LEI; 3R	LEI; 1R	LEI; 1R	LEI; 2R	HIL; 1R	HIL; 2R	MIL; 1R	MIL; 1R	HIL; 1R	HIL; 1R	LEI; 1R	LEI; 1R	LEI; 1R	WIG; 4R	WIG; 1R	WIG; 1R	WIG; QF
2026	HIL; 2R	HIL; 1R	WIG; 1R	WIG; 1R	LEI; 1R	LEI; 1R	LEI; 1R	LEI; 1R	WIG; 3R	WIG; 2R	MIL; 1R	MIL; 2R	HIL; 1R	HIL; 2R	LEI; 2R	LEI; 1R	LEI; 4R	LEI; 3R	MIL; 1R	MIL; 1R	WIG; 1R	WIG; 1R	Did not participate						ROS; 1R	ROS; DNP	ROS; 1R	ROS; 1R	LEI; 1R	LEI; 1R

Performance Table Legend
W	Won the tournament	F	Finalist	SF	Semifinalist	QF	Quarterfinalist	#R; RR; Prel.	Lost in # round Round-robin; Preliminary round	DQ	Disqualified
DNQ	Did not qualify	DNP	Did not participate	WD	Withdrew	NH	Tournament not held	#R; RR; Prel.	Lost in # round Round-robin; Preliminary round	NYF	Not yet founded

== Nine-dart finishes ==
Dimitri Van den Bergh televised nine-dart finishes
Date	Opponent	Tournament	Method	Prize
14 November 2018	(England) Stephen Bunting	Grand Slam	3 x T20; 3 x T20; T20, T19, D12	£25,000
14 July 2024	(Germany) Martin Schindler	World Matchplay	3 x T20; 3 x T20; T20, T19, D12	
1 February 2025	(Netherlands) Michael van Gerwen	PDC World Masters	3 x T20; 3 x T20; T20, T15, D18	
