= Gordon Mathers =

Australian darts player

Personal information
- Full name: Gordon Glen Mathers
- Nickname: "GG"
- Born: 29 September 1981 (age 45) Brisbane, Australia

Sport
- Sport: Darts
- Playing since: 1998
- Darts: 20g Shot Signature
- Laterality: Right-handed
- Walk-on music: "Khe Sanh" by Cold Chisel

Organisation (see split in darts)
- BDO: 2011–2020
- PDC: 2021–present (Tour Card: 2021–2022)

PDC premier events – best performances
- World Championship: Last 72: 2018
- UK Open: Last 128: 2022
- World Series Finals: Last 24: 2022

Other tournament wins
- Years
DPA Pro Tour (×19)	2012 (×3); 2013 (×3); 2016 (×1); 2017 (×3); 2018 (×1); 2019 (×4); 2020 (×1); 2024 (×2); 2025 (×1)
Oceanic Masters	2024
Sunshine State Classic	2019, 2023
Annual Ranking Champion
PDC Australian Tour Ranking Champion (DPA)	2017, 2020

Gordon Glen Mathers (born 29 September 1981) is an Australian professional darts player who competes in Professional Darts Corporation (PDC) events.

== Career ==
In 2017, he finished top of the DPA Australian Pro Tour ranking table, and made his PDC World Championship debut in the 2018 event. In the preliminary round he faced Japan's Seigo Asada, to whom he lost 1–2 in sets.

In 2018, Mathers continued playing in Australia on the DPA circuit, winning a tournament in Hobart and making it to the final on two other occasions. In August he played in the Brisbane Darts Masters, a tournament that was a part of the PDC's World Series of Darts, where he lost in the first round 1–6 to Raymond van Barneveld.

In 2019, Mathers won two DPA tournaments in East Devonport and in April he won the Sunshine State Classic, a tournament organised by the BDO, where he defeated Jeremy Fagg in the final.

Mathers attempted to get a PDC Tour Card in PDC Q-School 2020, his best result being a last 64 on the last day and hence did not gain his Tour Card. After that, Mathers stayed for the first four tournaments of the PDC Challenge Tour, reaching the semi-final of the third tournament. He returned to Australia and at the end of the season he topped the DPA Pro Tour, which secured him a spot in the 2021 PDC World Darts Championship. There, he lost 0–3 in the first round against Max Hopp.

In January 2021 he played in UK Q-School and although he was unable to win the Tour Card directly, he placed 8th in the UK Q-School Order of Merit and earned a two-year Tour Card. In his first season as a professional, he played in the 2021 UK Open, where he lost in the first round to Kirk Shepherd. Throughout the season, Mathers appeared only in Players Championship tournaments and failed to qualify for any other major tournaments. In November he lost in the final of the PDPA Qualifier for the 2022 PDC World Darts Championship against Nick Kenny. He served as a second reserve player for the World Championship and after the withdrawals of Charles Losper (replaced by Mike De Decker) and Juan Rodriguez, Mathers entered the tournament as the second highest ranked runner-up from the PDPA Qualifier. In the first round he played Jason Heaver and lost 1–3 in sets. He lost his Tour Card at the end of 2022.

After a period without a Tour Card, Mathers played mainly on the DPA Pro Tour and after taking advice from his family and the past tragedy of his father dying at just 57 due to heart failure, Mathers underwent the body transformation in 2024 following a 50kg weight loss.

Mathers made a notable comeback by winning the DPA Oceanic Masters in October 2024, where he enjoyed straight-sets 2–0 wins over Brian Corbett and Craig Caldwell in his opening two matches, before enjoying a trio of 3–1 victories on his way to the title. He saw off New Zealand's Mark Cleaver in the quarter-finals and then overcame emerging youngster Jaymie Hilton-Jones in the semifinals, after what he met Harley Kemp in final. After losing the final's opening leg, Mathers won six in a two to open up a two-set lead, with Kemp taking the third in a decider before wrapping up victory by taking the fourth 3–1. This title secured his return to the 2025 PDC World Darts Championship, where he lost 3–2 to Ricky Evans in the first round.

== World Championship results ==
=== PDC World Championship ===
- 2018: Preliminary round (lost to Seigo Asada 1–2)
- 2021: First round (lost to Max Hopp 0–3)
- 2022: First round (lost to Jason Heaver 1–3)
- 2025: First round (lost to Ricky Evans 2–3)

== Performance timeline ==
=== PDC ===
Tournament	2018	2021	2022	2025
PDC Ranked televised events
World Championship	Prel.	1R	1R	1R
UK Open	DNP	1R	2R	DNP
PDC Non-ranked televised events
World Series Finals	DNQ		1R	DNQ
Career statistics
Year-end ranking	–	103	87	–

==== Players Championships ====
Season	1	2	3	4	5	6	7	8	9	10	11	12	13	14	15	16	17	18	19	20	21	22	23	24	25	26	27	28	29	30
2021	BOL; 3R	BOL; 1R	BOL; 3R	BOL; 2R	MIL; 1R	MIL; 3R	MIL; 4R	MIL; 1R	NIE; 2R	NIE; 1R	NIE; 2R	NIE; 3R	MIL; 1R	MIL; 2R	MIL; 1R	MIL; 1R	COV; 2R	COV; 1R	COV; 2R	COV; 1R	BAR; 3R	BAR; 1R	BAR; 2R	BAR; 2R	BAR; 1R	BAR; 1R	BAR; 1R	BAR; 1R	BAR; 1R	BAR; 1R
2022	BAR; 1R	BAR; 4R	WIG; 2R	WIG; 2R	BAR; 1R	BAR; 2R	NIE; 2R	NIE; 1R	BAR; 1R	BAR; 1R	BAR; 4R	BAR; QF	BAR; 2R	WIG; 2R	WIG; 1R	NIE; 1R	NIE; 1R	BAR; 2R	BAR; 1R	BAR; 1R	BAR; 1R	BAR; 1R	BAR; 1R	BAR; 1R	BAR; DNP				BAR; 2R	BAR; 2R

==== World Series of Darts ====
Tournament	2018	2022	2025
Brisbane Masters	1R	NH	
Queensland Masters	NH	SF	NH
New South Wales Masters	NH	1R	NH
New Zealand Masters	NH	1R	1R

Performance Table Legend
W	Won the tournament	F	Finalist	SF	Semifinalist	QF	Quarterfinalist	#R; RR; Prel.	Lost in # round Round-robin; Preliminary round	DQ	Disqualified
DNQ	Did not qualify	DNP	Did not participate	WD	Withdrew	NH	Tournament not held	#R; RR; Prel.	Lost in # round Round-robin; Preliminary round	NYF	Not yet founded
