= 2021 UK Open =

2021 Ladbrokes UK Open

Tournament information
- Dates: 5–7 March 2021
- Venue: Arena MK
- Location: Milton Keynes, England
- Organisation(s): Professional Darts Corporation (PDC)
- Format: Legs; Final – best of 21
- Prize fund: £450,000
- Winner's share: £100,000
- Nine-dart finish: Sebastian Białecki; Jitse van der Wal
- High checkout: 170; Chris Dobey; Glen Durrant; Geert Nentjes; Devon Petersen; Michael Smith

Champion(s)
- James Wade (ENG)

The 2021 Ladbrokes UK Open was a darts tournament staged by the Professional Darts Corporation. It was the nineteenth year of the tournament where players compete in a single elimination tournament to be crowned champion. The tournament was held for the first time at the Arena MK in Milton Keynes, England, from 5 to 7 March 2021, and was played behind closed doors due to the COVID-19 pandemic.

Michael van Gerwen was the defending champion after defeating Gerwyn Price 11–9 in the 2020 final. However, he lost 11–5 to Luke Humphries in the semi-finals.

Lisa Ashton became the first woman to win a match at the UK Open since 2005, defeating Aaron Beeney 6–2 in Round 2, and also set a new world record for the highest televised average by a female player, with an average of 100.34. Sebastian Białecki, the first player born after the inaugural event in 2003 to play in the UK Open, hit a nine-dart finish in his opening round victory over Jim McEwan. Jitse van der Wal then hit a nine-dart finish against Białecki in the second round.

James Wade won his third UK Open title, and his first since 2011, with an 11–5 victory over Luke Humphries in the final.

== Prize money ==
The prize fund remained at £450,000. With the withdrawal of seven tour card players the field is reduced to 153 players.

Stage (no. of players)		Prize money (Total: £450,000)
Winner	(1)	£100,000
Runner-up	(1)	£40,000
Semi-finalists	(2)	£20,000
Quarter-finalists	(4)	£12,500
Last 16 (sixth round)	(8)	£7,500
Last 32 (fifth round)	(16)	£4,000
Last 64 (fourth round)	(32)	£2,000
Last 95 (third round)	(31)	£1,000
Last 127 (second round)	(32)	£0
Last 153 (first round)	(25)	£0

== Format ==
There is a slight change in format for this year. Due to the COVID-19 pandemic, no Rileys amateur qualifiers could be held. In 2021, the top eight of both the UK and European Qualifying School Order of Merits who have not yet qualified for the tournament filled those 16 spots.

The 153 participants will enter the competition incrementally, with 50 players entering in the first round, with match winners joining the 32 players entering in the second and third rounds to leave the last 64 in the fourth round.

- No players are seeded.
- A random draw is held for each of the following rounds following the conclusion of the third round.
- All matches in the first, second and third rounds will be played over best of 11 legs.
- All matches in the fourth, fifth and sixth rounds and quarter-finals will be played over best of 19 legs.
- All matches in the semi-finals and final will be played over best of 21 legs.
- Eight boards will be used for matches in the first, second, third and fourth rounds.
- Four boards will be used for matches in the fifth round.
- Two boards will be used for matches in the sixth round.
- One board will be used for all the matches in the quarter-finals, semi-finals and final.

== Qualifiers ==
Boris Krčmar, Daniel Larsson, Darren Penhall, Wesley Harms, Michael Unterbuchner and Robert Marijanović withdrew before the draw was made.

Cristo Reyes and Florian Hempel withdrew after the draw took place, so their opponents Jitse van der Wal (in round 1) and Ryan Joyce (in round 3) both got byes to their next respective rounds. Justin Pipe tested positive for COVID-19, meaning Luke Humphries received a bye to round 4.

=== Number 1–32 of the PDC Order of Merit (receiving byes into fourth round) ===
1. Gerwyn Price
2. Michael van Gerwen
3. Peter Wright
4. Rob Cross
5. James Wade
6. Gary Anderson
7. Dave Chisnall
8. Michael Smith
9. Dimitri Van den Bergh
10. Nathan Aspinall
11. Daryl Gurney
12. Ian White
13. Glen Durrant
14. Krzysztof Ratajski
15. José de Sousa
16. Joe Cullen
17. Stephen Bunting
18. Jonny Clayton
19. Simon Whitlock
20. Mensur Suljović
21. Mervyn King
22. Danny Noppert
23. Jeffrey de Zwaan
24. Adrian Lewis
25. Chris Dobey
26. Vincent van der Voort
27. Jermaine Wattimena
28. Jamie Hughes
29. Gabriel Clemens
30. Dirk van Duijvenbode
31. Ricky Evans
32. Devon Petersen

=== Number 33–64 of the PDC Order of Merit (receiving byes into third round) ===
33. Steve Beaton
34. Brendan Dolan
35. William O'Connor
36. Keegan Brown
37. Ryan Searle
38. Kim Huybrechts
39. Max Hopp
40. Darius Labanauskas
41. Luke Humphries
42. John Henderson
43. Ross Smith
44. Ryan Joyce
45. Darren Webster
46. Steve West
47. ~~Justin Pipe~~ (withdrew)
48. Damon Heta
49. Luke Woodhouse
50. Ron Meulenkamp
51. Steve Lennon
52. Andy Boulton
53. Madars Razma
54. Jelle Klaasen
55. Mickey Mansell
56. Adam Hunt
57. Callan Rydz
58. Matthew Edgar
59. Ted Evetts
60. Josh Payne
61. Jason Lowe
62. James Wilson
63. Mark McGeeney
64. ~~Cristo Reyes~~ (withdrew)

=== Number 65–96 of the PDC Order of Merit (receiving byes into second round) ===
65. Maik Kuivenhoven
66. Jeff Smith
67. Scott Waites
68. Ryan Murray
69. Martijn Kleermaker
70. Wayne Jones
71. Karel Sedláček
72. Derk Telnekes
73. Nick Kenny
74. Andy Hamilton
75. Mike De Decker
76. Ryan Meikle
77. Lisa Ashton
78. Bradley Brooks
79. William Borland
80. Ciarán Teehan
81. Alan Tabern
82. Kai Fan Leung
83. Jesús Noguera
84. Raymond van Barneveld
85. Krzysztof Kciuk
86. Steve Brown
87. Peter Jacques
88. Martin Atkins
89. Steffen Siepmann
90. Gary Blades
91. Alan Soutar
92. Harald Leitinger
93. Eddie Lovely
94. Keane Barry
95. Jonathan Worsley
96. Aaron Beeney

=== Number 97–128 of the PDC Order of Merit (starting in first round) ===
97. John Brown
98. Gordon Mathers
99. John Michael
100. Jake Jones
101. Kirk Shepherd
102. Martin Schindler
103. Lewy Williams
104. Jack Main
105. Berry van Peer
106. Scott Mitchell
107. Ritchie Edhouse
108. Geert Nentjes
109. Geert De Vos
110. Martin Lukeman
111. Danny Baggish
112. Joe Murnan
113. Peter Hudson
114. Zoran Lerchbacher
115. Adam Gawlas
116. Boris Koltsov
117. Brett Claydon
118. Andrew Gilding
119. David Evans
120. Jason Heaver
121. ~~Florian Hempel~~ (withdrew)
122. Niels Zonneveld

=== PDC Development Tour qualifiers (starting in first round) ===
The top 8 ranked players from the 2020 Development Tour Order of Merit who didn't have a Tour Card for the 2021 season qualified for the first round.

1. Damian Mol
2. Kevin Doets
3. Dom Taylor
4. Joe Davis
5. Keelan Kay
6. Brian Raman
7. Rhys Griffin
8. Sebastian Białecki

=== PDC Challenge Tour qualifiers (starting in first round) ===
The top 8 ranked players from the 2020 Challenge Tour Order of Merit who didn't have a Tour Card for the 2021 season qualified for the first round.

1. Matthew Dennant
2. Jim Williams
3. Rob Collins
4. Maikel Verberk
5. Jitse van der Wal
6. Nathan Rafferty
7. Richie Burnett
8. Scott Taylor

=== PDC UK Qualifying School qualifiers (starting in first round) ===
The top 8 ranked players from the 2021 UK Qualifying School Order of Merit who didn't have a Tour Card for the 2021 season qualified for the first round.

1. Chas Barstow
2. Gavin Carlin
3. Martin Thomas
4. Kevin McDine
5. Jim McEwan
6. Shane McGuirk
7. Matt Jackson
8. Sean Fisher

=== PDC European Qualifying School qualifiers (starting in first round) ===
The top 8 ranked players from the 2021 European Qualifying School Order of Merit who didn't have a Tour Card for the 2021 season qualified for the first round.

1. Rusty-Jake Rodriguez
2. Luc Peters
3. Rowby-John Rodriguez
4. Lorenzo Pronk
5. Gino Vos
6. Michael Rasztovits
7. Ryan de Vreede
8. Lukas Wenig

== Draw ==
=== Friday 5 March ===
==== First round (best of eleven legs) ====
With the withdrawal of the six Tour Card holders, six players received a bye to the second round.

Player	Score	Player	Player	Score	Player
Rob Collins	w/o	Bye	David Evans	w/o	Bye
Andrew Gilding	w/o	Bye	Michael Rasztovits	w/o	Bye
Martin Thomas	w/o	Bye	Scott Mitchell	w/o	Bye
Rhys Griffin 89.44	6 – 5	Sean Fisher 92.68	Matt Jackson 84.19	3 – 6	Nathan Rafferty 85.13
Brett Claydon 81.12	3 – 6	Danny Baggish 88.68	Keelan Kay 81.55	5 – 6	Kevin McDine 89.93
Boris Koltsov 89.02	6 – 1	Rusty-Jake Rodriguez 87.38	Rowby-John Rodriguez 98.44	6 – 4	Brian Raman 91.95
Berry van Peer 88.19	5 – 6	Martin Schindler 92.06	Jitse van der Wal	w/o	Florian Hempel
Geert De Vos 85.86	2 – 6	Niels Zonneveld 96.18	Martin Lukeman 88.18	4 – 6	Maikel Verberk 93.96
Scott Taylor 95.20	6 – 4	John Michael 86.79	Shane McGuirk 92.09	2 – 6	Jack Main 94.50
Jason Heaver 92.91	6 – 2	Lorenzo Pronk 81.14	Luc Peters 86.05	3 – 6	Lewy Williams 94.34
Jim McEwan 90.40	2 – 6	Sebastian Białecki 95.70	Chas Barstow 89.91	6 – 4	Lukas Wenig 90.66
Joe Murnan 85.59	6 – 2	Matthew Dennant 83.15	Joe Davis 85.39	3 – 6	Kevin Doets 89.66
Adam Gawlas 87.84	4 – 6	Gino Vos 94.61	Geert Nentjes 92.19	6 – 5	Richie Burnett 91.94
John Brown 97.99	6 – 4	Gavin Carlin 91.48	Jake Jones 77.53	5 – 6	Dom Taylor 81.52
Zoran Lerchbacher 96.50	5 – 6	Jim Williams 91.62	Gordon Mathers 95.08	3 – 6	Kirk Shepherd 100.06
Peter Hudson 96.70	6 – 1	Ryan de Vreede 88.22	Ritchie Edhouse 90.27	4 – 6	Damian Mol 92.22

==== Second round (best of eleven legs) ====
Player	Score	Player	Player	Score	Player
Scott Waites	w/o	Steve Brown	Scott Taylor 87.43	6 – 5	Maikel Verberk 87.96
Nick Kenny 94.69	6 – 5	Ryan Meikle 92.25	Ciarán Teehan 94.00	6 – 5	Danny Baggish 91.28
Lewy Williams 93.91	5 – 6	Scott Mitchell 91.10	Keane Barry 81.97	6 – 1	Geert Nentjes 76.60
Maik Kuivenhoven 80.96	6 – 4	Boris Koltsov 78.78	Kevin McDine 77.40	3 – 6	Rowby-John Rodriguez 85.00
Joe Murnan 87.99	3 – 6	Kai Fan Leung 91.03	Andy Hamilton 86.04	6 – 5	Damian Mol 80.31
Alan Soutar 93.60	6 – 3	Raymond van Barneveld 87.46	Jack Main 85.57	6 – 4	Rob Collins 86.56
Sebastian Białecki 93.05	6 – 3	Jitse van der Wal 88.10	Chas Barstow 89.66	6 – 1	Martin Thomas 84.73
Michael Rasztovits 92.38	2 – 6	Peter Jacques 103.54	William Borland 97.65	4 – 6	Kevin Doets 98.43
Aaron Beeney 86.71	2 – 6	Lisa Ashton 100.34	Martin Atkins 96.05	6 – 3	Bradley Brooks 85.03
Jason Heaver 84.48	5 – 6	Eddie Lovely 83.31	Niels Zonneveld 81.58	2 – 6	Derk Telnekes 84.09
Jonathan Worsley 92.19	1 – 6	Andrew Gilding 97.78	Martijn Kleermaker 82.43	6 – 3	Wayne Jones 80.89
Peter Hudson 92.35	6 – 1	Jesús Noguera 80.45	Jim Williams 101.79	6 – 1	Kirk Shepherd 90.63
John Brown 80.40	6 – 5	Nathan Rafferty 76.61	Dom Taylor 70.59	0 – 6	Gary Blades 85.08
Steffen Siepmann 85.38	4 – 6	David Evans 83.05	Mike De Decker 88.35	4 – 6	Rhys Griffin 88.29
Alan Tabern 93.55	5 – 6	Gino Vos 92.66	Ryan Murray 92.87	2 – 6	Krzysztof Kciuk 93.89
Jeff Smith 88.19	1 – 6	Martin Schindler 95.75	Harald Leitinger 72.00	0 – 6	Karel Sedláček 87.55

==== Third round (best of eleven legs) ====
Player	Score	Player	Player	Score	Player
Lisa Ashton 80.95	2 – 6	Darius Labanauskas 85.45	Keane Barry 85.99	2 – 6	Luke Woodhouse 93.12
Max Hopp 99.61	6 – 3	William O'Connor 95.46	Kai Fan Leung 87.39	6 – 5	Nick Kenny 95.52
Scott Mitchell 94.42	6 – 3	Andrew Gilding 93.68	Karel Sedláček 93.94	6 – 0	Rhys Griffin 84.23
James Wilson 80.88	1 – 6	Keegan Brown 100.24	Steve West 93.37	1 – 6	Jason Lowe 93.27
Krzysztof Kciuk 97.36	5 – 6	Kim Huybrechts 98.00	Maik Kuivenhoven 87.22	1 – 6	Brendan Dolan 92.79
Jack Main 93.13	5 – 6	Ryan Searle 94.29	Ryan Joyce	w/o	Cristo Reyes
Mark McGeeney 79.67	6 – 5	Steve Beaton 85.59	Eddie Lovely 88.84	2 – 6	Ron Meulenkamp 96.07
Jim Williams 95.09	2 – 6	Madars Razma 97.48	Ted Evetts 87.00	4 – 6	Darren Webster 99.60
Martin Schindler 93.38	5 – 6	Martijn Kleermaker 95.03	Justin Pipe	w/o	Luke Humphries
John Henderson 92.75	6 – 5	Matthew Edgar 92.65	Scott Taylor 86.03	0 – 6	Adam Hunt 95.94
Rowby-John Rodriguez 88.89	6 – 5	Josh Payne 85.00	Damon Heta 81.66	1 – 6	David Evans 79.04
Kevin Doets 89.42	4 – 6	Steve Lennon 99.41	Sebastian Białecki 89.80	6 – 3	Derk Telnekes 90.89
Peter Hudson 97.77	6 – 1	Gino Vos 92.59	John Brown 81.04	6 – 3	Chas Barstow 84.35
Andy Boulton 101.70	6 – 3	Jelle Klaasen 91.34	Andy Hamilton 99.32	6 – 1	Gary Blades 84.39
Ross Smith 95.91	5 – 6	Callan Rydz 96.06	Peter Jacques 85.32	6 – 1	Ciarán Teehan 75.90
Martin Atkins 96.04	4 – 6	Scott Waites 101.94	Alan Soutar 103.88	6 – 3	Mickey Mansell 91.88

==== Fourth round (best of nineteen legs) ====
Player	Score	Player	Player	Score	Player
Daryl Gurney 101.43	10 – 8	Jason Lowe 99.30	Ryan Searle 103.55	10 – 7	Adrian Lewis 96.34
Max Hopp 98.79	10 – 6	Vincent van der Voort 99.51	John Brown 90.53	10 – 6	Mark McGeeney 83.89
Callan Rydz 86.41	10 – 6	Jermaine Wattimena 89.11	Jonny Clayton 99.90	10 – 7	Rowby-John Rodriguez 95.04
Darius Labanauskas 93.20	10 – 5	Darren Webster 89.08	Joe Cullen 99.19	9 – 10	Michael Smith 101.57
Ryan Joyce 98.04	9 – 10	James Wade 102.37	Michael van Gerwen 99.06	10 – 8	Scott Mitchell 95.05
Gerwyn Price 94.35	10 – 5	Peter Hudson 87.85	Ian White 97.83	7 – 10	Ricky Evans 97.79
Alan Soutar 92.06	10 – 5	Stephen Bunting 94.73	Kai Fan Leung 89.30	7 – 10	Brendan Dolan 97.18
Peter Wright 94.25	5 – 10	Dave Chisnall 100.11	Andy Hamilton 89.50	8 – 10	Rob Cross 92.56
Martijn Kleermaker 87.37	10 – 8	Jamie Hughes 84.73	Karel Sedláček 90.28	7 – 10	Simon Whitlock 98.45
Nathan Aspinall 101.66	5 – 10	Krzysztof Ratajski 102.57	Gary Anderson 93.72	9 – 10	Dirk van Duijvenbode 101.03
Devon Petersen 95.17	10 – 5	Jeffrey de Zwaan 91.48	Luke Woodhouse 95.52	10 – 5	Dimitri Van den Bergh 91.70
Andy Boulton 92.22	9 – 10	Peter Jacques 92.61	Mensur Suljović 99.53	10 – 6	Sebastian Białecki 93.48
Gabriel Clemens 97.50	10 – 4	Adam Hunt 93.69	Mervyn King 102.45	9 – 10	José de Sousa 97.98
Steve Lennon 93.01	7 – 10	Ron Meulenkamp 94.43	David Evans 92.19	6 – 10	Madars Razma 100.26
Scott Waites 96.04	10 – 6	Keegan Brown 87.34	John Henderson 91.51	6 – 10	Chris Dobey 95.13
Glen Durrant 89.61	6 – 10	Danny Noppert 95.02	Kim Huybrechts 99.85	8 – 10	Luke Humphries 99.29

=== Saturday 6 March ===
==== Fifth round (best of nineteen legs) ====
Player	Score	Player	Player	Score	Player
Scott Waites 91.16	5 – 10	Devon Petersen 94.01	Darius Labanauskas 95.07	9 – 10	Simon Whitlock 98.02
Rob Cross 101.75	7 – 10	James Wade 97.50	Luke Humphries 101.68	10 – 7	Ryan Searle 101.38
Gerwyn Price 98.66	10 – 3	Ricky Evans 92.37	Michael Smith 90.30	9 – 10	José de Sousa 93.17
Callan Rydz 86.65	6 – 10	Martijn Kleermaker 88.65	Alan Soutar 92.33	10 – 7	Ron Meulenkamp 93.73
Chris Dobey 99.31	10 – 1	John Brown 84.73	Luke Woodhouse 90.09	6 – 10	Brendan Dolan 93.61
Peter Jacques 93.49	10 – 9	Max Hopp 91.93	Dave Chisnall 104.37	10 – 7	Danny Noppert 99.40
Michael van Gerwen 103.78	10 – 4	Mensur Suljović 98.89	Daryl Gurney 93.06	7 – 10	Gabriel Clemens 100.86
Jonny Clayton 108.39	10 – 3	Dirk van Duijvenbode 99.07	Krzysztof Ratajski 100.55	10 – 8	Madars Razma 93.89

==== Sixth round (best of nineteen legs) ====
Player	Score	Player	Player	Score	Player
José de Sousa 97.42	9 – 10	Michael van Gerwen 99.72	Devon Petersen 90.11	10 – 4	Peter Jacques 88.20
Gabriel Clemens 89.36	5 – 10	James Wade 99.99	Luke Humphries 93.53	10 – 4	Martijn Kleermaker 82.11
Brendan Dolan 94.04	9 – 10	Simon Whitlock 98.78	Chris Dobey 101.31	5 – 10	Gerwyn Price 102.07
Krzysztof Ratajski 103.52	10 – 3	Jonny Clayton 96.05	Dave Chisnall 99.52	10 – 8	Alan Soutar 91.28

=== Sunday 7 March ===
==== Quarter-finals (best of nineteen legs) ====
Player	Score	Player
Simon Whitlock 96.70	8 – 10	James Wade 98.39
Gerwyn Price 100.71	10 – 9	Devon Petersen 98.21
Dave Chisnall 96.07	9 – 10	Luke Humphries 98.78
Krzysztof Ratajski 104.14	7 – 10	Michael van Gerwen 102.82

==== Semi-finals and Final ====
Semi-finals (best of 21 legs)
James Wade 97.63	11
Gerwyn Price 96.68	6
Luke Humphries 107.41	11
Michael van Gerwen 106.27	5

Final (best of 21 legs)
James Wade 102.52	11
Luke Humphries 97.95	5
