= 2022 New Zealand Darts Masters =

2022 TAB New Zealand Darts Masters

Tournament information
- Dates: 26–27 August 2022
- Venue: Globox Arena
- Location: Hamilton
- Country: New Zealand
- Organisation(s): PDC
- Format: Legs
- Prize fund: £60,000
- Winner's share: £20,000
- High checkout: 150 Dimitri Van den Bergh

Champion(s)
- Gerwyn Price

The 2022 TAB New Zealand Darts Masters was the second staging of the tournament by the Professional Darts Corporation, and the sixth entry in the 2022 World Series of Darts. The tournament featured 16 players (eight PDC players and eight regional qualifiers) and was held at the Globox Arena in Hamilton, New Zealand on 26–27 August 2022.

Michael van Gerwen was the defending champion after defeating Raymond van Barneveld 8–1 in the 2019 final. However, he was defeated by Jonny Clayton 3–6 in the quarter-finals.

Gerwyn Price won his first World Series title (excluding the World Series Finals in 2020) after beating Clayton 8–4 in the final.

== Prize money ==
The total prize fund remained at £60,000.

Position (no. of players)		Prize money (Total: £60,000)
Winner	(1)	£20,000
Runner-up	(1)	£10,000
Semi-finalists	(2)	£5,000
Quarter-finalists	(4)	£2,500
First round	(8)	£1,250

== Qualifiers ==
The PDC announced 6 of the 8 players who have been their representatives at the event on 11 April 2022, including Fallon Sherrock, who was denied her chance to appear on the 2020 World Series of Darts circuit, owing to the COVID-19 pandemic. On 30 May 2022, it was announced that Jonny Clayton and Joe Cullen would complete the field of PDC representatives.

On 27 July, it was announced that Peter Wright had withdrawn from the three Oceania events for medical reasons, and so was replaced by the current World Series Order of Merit leader Dimitri Van den Bergh.

The seeding are based on the World Series Order of Merit following the first 5 events.

1. Dimitri Van den Bergh (semi-finals)
2. Michael van Gerwen (quarter-finals)
3. Michael Smith (semi-finals)
4. James Wade (quarter-finals)
5. Gerwyn Price (champion)
6. Jonny Clayton (runner-up)
7. Joe Cullen (quarter-finals)
8. Fallon Sherrock (first round)

The Oceanic qualifiers consisted of their three PDC Tour Card holders (Damon Heta, Simon Whitlock and Gordon Mathers), plus the top two on the DPNZ Order of Merit, the two New Zealand players who won the DPNZ qualifiers, along with one Australian player from the DPA qualifier.

Qualification	Player
PDC Tour Card Holders	Damon Heta (first round)
PDC Tour Card Holders	Simon Whitlock (first round)
PDC Tour Card Holders	Gordon Mathers (first round)
DPNZ Order of Merit #1	Ben Robb (first round)
DPNZ Order of Merit #2	Warren Parry (first round)
DPNZ Qualifiers	Bernie Smith (first round)
DPNZ Qualifiers	Kayden Milne (quarter-finals)
DPA Qualifier	Mal Cuming (first round)

== Draw ==
First round (best of 11 legs); 26 August
1	Dimitri Van den Bergh 100.37	6
Simon Whitlock 93.86	4
Joe Cullen 92.52	6
Damon Heta 91.90	2
4	James Wade 96.09	6
Gordon Mathers 89.45	5
Gerwyn Price 104.95	6
Ben Robb 93.33	3
2	Michael van Gerwen 99.10	6
Bernie Smith 90.55	3
Jonny Clayton 88.14	6
Mal Cuming 78.55	1
3	Michael Smith 83.07	6
Warren Parry 83.21	3
Fallon Sherrock 82.44	5
Kayden Milne 79.07	6

Quarter-finals (best of 11 legs); 27 August
1	Dimitri Van den Bergh 81.99	6
Joe Cullen 86.49	5
4	James Wade 93.80	2
Gerwyn Price 94.19	6
2	Michael van Gerwen 92.55	3
Jonny Clayton 98.32	6
3	Michael Smith 99.10	6
Kayden Milne 76.83	0

Semi-finals (best of 13 legs); 27 August
1	Dimitri Van den Bergh 93.43	4
Gerwyn Price 92.23	7
Jonny Clayton 90.70	7
3	Michael Smith 95.41	5

Final (best of 15 legs); 27 August
Gerwyn Price 93.15	8
Jonny Clayton 96.31	4
