= 2022 World Series of Darts =

Darts tournament

The 2022 World Series of Darts was a series of televised darts tournaments organised by the Professional Darts Corporation. Six World Series events and one finals event, which like the previous year took place in Amsterdam, Netherlands, were held.

After delays in 2020 and 2021, owing to the COVID-19 pandemic, three new venues made their debuts with New York City replacing Las Vegas for the US Darts Masters, and two Australian events were moved to new cities in Wollongong and Townsville. A fourth new venue was added on 11 April, with the Dutch Darts Masters making its debut at the Ziggo Dome in Amsterdam, scheduled for 24–25 June, meaning that Amsterdam hosted two events in the 2022 World Series.

Just before the Oceanic events, it was announced that the winner and runner-up of the Queensland Masters and New South Wales Masters will receive boomerang-style trophies in honour of Kyle Anderson, who died in 2021, with the best Oceanic player across the 3 Oceanic World Series events (Queensland, New South Wales and New Zealand) receiving the Kyle Anderson Memorial Trophy. For his run to the semi-finals of the Queensland Masters, Gordon Mathers was awarded the trophy following the conclusion of the New Zealand Masters.

== Prize money ==
International events
Stage	Prize money
Winner	£20,000
Runner-up	£10,000
Semi-finals	£5,000
Quarter-finals	£2,500
First round	£1,250
Total	£60,000

Finals
Stage	Prize money
Winner	£70,000
Runner-up	£30,000
Semi-finals	£20,000
Quarter-finals	£15,000
Second round	£7,500
First round	£5,000
Total	£300,000

== World Series events ==
No.	Date	Event	Venue	Champion	Legs	Runner-up	Ref
1	3–4 June	US Darts Masters	(United States) New York City, Hulu Theater	Michael Smith	8–4	Michael van Gerwen	
2	10–11 June	Nordic Darts Masters	(Denmark) Copenhagen, Forum Copenhagen	Dimitri Van den Bergh	11–5	Gary Anderson	
3	24–25 June	Dutch Darts Masters	(Netherlands) Amsterdam, Ziggo Dome	Dimitri Van den Bergh	8–2	Dirk van Duijvenbode	
4	12–13 August	Queensland Darts Masters	(Australia) Townsville, Townsville Entertainment and Convention Centre	Michael van Gerwen	8–5	Gerwyn Price	
5	19–20 August	New South Wales Darts Masters	(Australia) Wollongong, WIN Entertainment Centre	Jonny Clayton	8–1	James Wade	
6	26–27 August	New Zealand Darts Masters	(New Zealand) Hamilton, Globox Arena	Gerwyn Price	8–4	Jonny Clayton	
7	16–18 September	World Series of Darts Finals	(Netherlands) Amsterdam, AFAS Live	Gerwyn Price	11–10	Dirk van Duijvenbode	
