= Gerwyn Price =

Welsh darts player and former rugby player (born 1985)

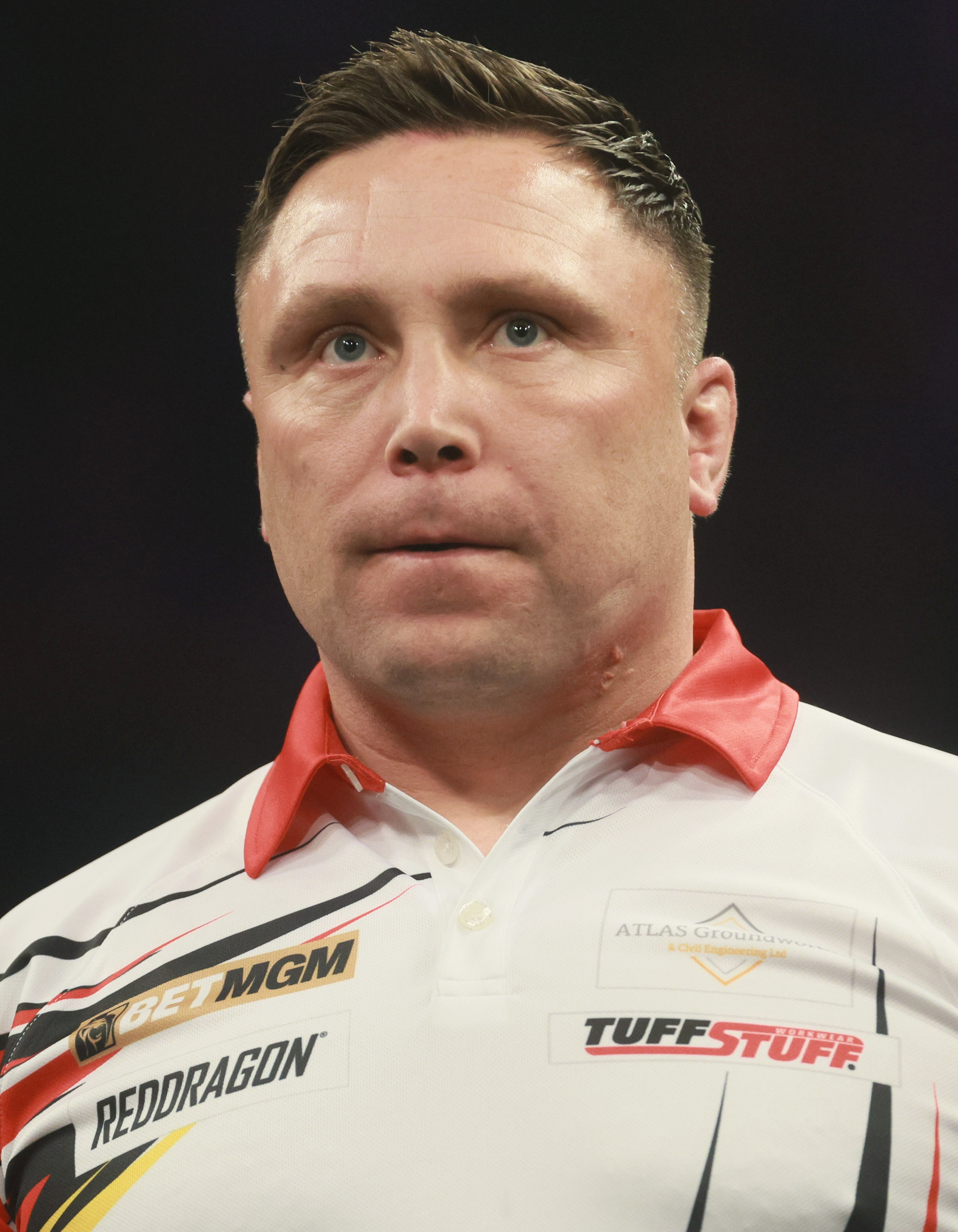
- Price in 2025

Personal information
- Nickname: "The Iceman"
- Born: 7 March 1985 (age 41) Markham, Caerphilly, Wales

Sport
- Sport: Darts
- Playing since: 2012
- Darts: 23g Red Dragon Signature
- Laterality: Right-handed
- Walk-on music: "Ice Ice Baby" by Vanilla Ice

Organisation (see split in darts)
- PDC: 2014–present (Tour Card: 2014–present)
- Current world ranking: (PDC) 3 ▲1 (22 November 2026)

PDC premier events – best performances
- World Championship: Winner (1): 2021
- World Matchplay: Runner-up: 2022, 2026
- World Grand Prix: Winner (1): 2020
- UK Open: Runner-up: 2017, 2020
- Grand Slam: Winner (4): 2018, 2019, 2021, 2026
- European Championship: Runner-up: 2019
- Premier League: Runner-up: 2023
- PC Finals: Runner-up: 2019
- Masters: Semi-final: 2021, 2026
- Champions League: Semi-final: 2019
- World Series Finals: Winner (2): 2020, 2022

Other tournament wins
- Years
PDC World Cup of Darts (Team event)	2020, 2023
European Tour Events (×10)
Baltic Sea Darts Open	2025
Belgian Darts Championship	2020
European Darts Grand Prix	2026
European Darts Open	2023
Gibraltar Darts Trophy	2021
Hungarian Darts Trophy	2021
International Darts Open (×4)	2018, 2019, 2022, 2023
Players Championships (×22)
2016 (×2), 2019 (×3), 2020 (×4), 2021 (×2), 2022 (×2), 2023 (×4), 2025 (×4), 2026
World Series of Darts (×4)
Australian Darts Masters	2024
New Zealand Darts Masters	2022
Nordic Darts Masters	2024
Poland Darts Masters	2025

Gerwyn Price (born 7 March 1985) is a Welsh professional darts player and former professional rugby union and rugby league player. He competes in Professional Darts Corporation (PDC) events, where he is ranked world number three; he was ranked world number one on three occasions from 2021 to 2022. Nicknamed "the Iceman", he won the PDC World Championship in 2021.

Price broke into the top 32 of the PDC World Rankings in 2016 and soon afterwards won his first Pro Tour title. He finished as runner-up in his first major final at the 2017 UK Open before winning his first major title at the 2018 Grand Slam of Darts, a tournament he would win again a year later in 2019. Price defeated Gary Anderson in the 2021 final to become the first Welsh PDC World Champion. He has won eight PDC major titles, including four Grand Slam titles, the 2020 World Grand Prix, and the World Series Finals on two occasions. He has won two PDC World Cups representing Wales alongside Jonny Clayton. Price has won seven PDC major singles titles, placing him joint sixth in the all-time list. Price has won a total of 46 PDC titles in his professional career, including ten European Tour titles.

Price has also played rugby union for Welsh Premier Division sides Neath and Cross Keys, Pro12 with Glasgow Warriors and rugby league with South Wales Scorpions.

== Rugby career ==
Price played under-19 international rugby for Wales. He played as a hooker for Welsh Premier Division sides Neath and Cross Keys as well as rugby league with South Wales Scorpions and Blackwood Bulldogs where he was capped by Wales Dragonhearts. He also had a short spell at Pro12 side Glasgow Warriors as injury cover for their first choice players. During Price's time with Cross Keys, they won the 2011–12 WRU Challenge Cup, with Price scoring a try in the final. He ended his rugby career in 2014 in order to concentrate on playing darts full-time.

== Darts career ==
Price began playing darts for his local side Markham Welfare, before playing in the Super League for Aberbargoed. Welsh darts professional Barrie Bates advised him to enter Qualifying School to join the Professional Darts Corporation (PDC) in January 2014 and Price was successful in the second event. He won six matches on the day concluding with a 5–3 victory over Rowby-John Rodriguez to earn a two-year tour card. He qualified for the 2014 UK Open, and lost 5–2 to Aden Kirk in the second round. He twice reached the last 16 stage of Players Championship events during the first half of 2014, losing to Michael van Gerwen and Stephen Bunting. In July, Price had a three-dart average of 98.32 in beating former world number one Colin Lloyd 6–2 at the European Darts Open. In the second round he led Gary Anderson 2–0 but went on to lose 6–3. At the 13th Players Championship, Price saw off Lloyd, Kirk, James Wade and Wayne Jones to advance to the quarter-finals for the first time, where he was edged out 6–5 by Adrian Lewis.

Price qualified for the European Darts Trophy in Leipzig during mid September. There, he beat Bernd Roith 6–3 in the first round to face Steve Beaton in the second round. Thanks to a great performance, which included the tournament's highest finish of 167, he saw off Beaton 6–3 and won against Vincent van der Voort in the following round. He nearly qualified for the 2014 World Grand Prix, for which a place in the semi-finals was needed, but was beaten 6–3 in the quarter-finals by Andy Hamilton. Price's impressive start to his darting career continued by reaching his first semi-final at the 19th Players Championship where he lost 6–3 to Ian White.

=== 2015 ===
The £12,750 he earned in Pro Tour events during 2014 saw him finish 39th on the Order of Merit to claim the eighth of sixteen places that were on offer to non-qualified players for the 2015 World Championship. Price missed one dart at tops to level at one set all against Peter Wright in the first round and was beaten 3–0. His successful year saw him start 2015 ranked world number 59.

Price was knocked out of the preliminary round of the 2015 UK Open 5–2 by Matt Padgett. On his way to his first quarter-final of the year, Price eliminated Adrian Lewis 6–4 with an average of 105.78 at the second Players Championship event, but he went on to lose 6–2 to James Wade. At the Gibraltar Darts Trophy, Price defeated two top 16 players in Robert Thornton and Simon Whitlock to play in his second career European Tour quarter-final, where compatriot Jamie Lewis narrowly won 6–5. In total during the first half of 2015 Price lost in four quarter-finals on the Pro Tour, and reached the semi-finals of the eighth Players Championship where he lost 6–4 to Adrian Lewis. These results sealed his qualification for the World Matchplay through the Pro Tour Order of Merit, with Price seeing off Michael Smith 10–4 in his debut in the event. He then produced the performance of his career to date as he defeated two-time world champion Lewis 13–10, but could only average 88.17 in his first major quarter-final during a 16–7 defeat by Peter Wright. Price met Smith again in the first round of the World Grand Prix with the tie going to a deciding set in which Price established a 2–0 leg lead. He would miss two match darts as Smith levelled and in the final leg Price was unable to score a point as he missed a total of 15 darts at doubles in the double-start event. He led Ian White 9–8 in the second round of the Players Championship Finals, but went on to lose 10–9.

=== 2016 ===
Andrew Gilding won each set in the first round of the 2016 World Championship by three legs to one in beating Price 3–0. In February at the fifth UK Open Qualifier, Price defeated Mark Webster 6–1 and Mensur Suljović 6–3 to reach his first PDC final, but he was denied the title by world number one Michael van Gerwen who triumphed 6–2. In the seventh Players Championship, Price won through to another final and this time took the title by coming back from 3–0 down against Peter Wright to win 6–3. He also took the eighth event as he averaged 108 in the final during a 6–1 victory over Jamie Caven. After knocking out Kim Huybrechts 10–8 at the World Matchplay, Price would face Adrian Lewis in the second round for the second year in a row. Before the match Lewis stated that Price's win over him 12 months ago was lucky and that Price was a "big mouth who's never won anything and never will win anything". The pre-match tension seemed to affect both players as both averaged in the 80s with Lewis prevailing 11–5. Price lost 2–0 in the first round of the World Grand Prix to Benito van de Pas, and 10–2 to Michael van Gerwen in the second round of the European Championship. Wins over Scott Waites and Robert Thornton saw him top his group on his debut at the Grand Slam of Darts. He missed one match dart against Brendan Dolan in the last 16 in a 10–9 defeat.

=== 2017 ===
After taking the opening set against Jonny Clayton in their first round match at the 2017 World Championship, Price lost three in a row to be beaten 3–1. He was ranked 20th on the Order of Merit afterwards. He defeated Justin Pipe 10–5, David Pallett 10–4 and Paul Hogan 10–6 at the UK Open to reach the quarter-finals. Ian White was on 20 to win 10–9, but hit a double 15 to burst his score and Price stepped in with a 160 checkout to progress through to the semi-finals where he was locked at 9–9 with Alan Norris. Norris missed three darts to take the 19th leg and Price finished 100 with two double tops, before breaking throw in the next to win 11–9. In his first major final he was 7–2 down to Peter Wright, before reducing his deficit to 8–6. However, Price then lost the last three legs to be beaten 11–6.

Victories over Finland, Ireland and Russia helped Price and Mark Webster into the semi-finals of the World Cup of Darts. A pair of 4–2 wins over the Belgian team of Kim and Ronny Huybrechts saw them play in the final, where their only point came courtesy of a Webster win over Raymond van Barneveld as they went down 3–1 to the Dutch.

=== 2018 ===
In the 2018 World Championship, Price won in the first round of the World Championship for the first time when he beat Ted Evetts 3–0. In the second round Price beat Ian White 4–1. In the third round Price faced the defending World Champion Michael van Gerwen. Van Gerwen won the first two sets but then Price won seven legs in a row to go two sets all and ahead in the fifth set. Price had set darts in the fifth set, but failed to take them. Van Gerwen won the fifth and sixth set which meant Price lost the match 2–4.

Following good performances over 2017 Price was selected as a wildcard for the 2018 Premier League Darts tournament. Despite good draws against world number 2 Peter Wright and 2017 World Grand Prix winner Daryl Gurney, Price failed to register a victory and was eliminated on week nine's judgement night at the Echo Arena Liverpool.

Price started to show some consistency in the televised majors in 2018, reaching the quarter-finals of the Masters, UK Open, World Grand Prix and European Championship. He also won a European Tour event in September, the International Darts Open in Germany, just 2 months after having an operation to repair a broken achilles heel. In November, Price, as a 40/1 outsider at the start of the event, won his first televised PDC major by winning the Grand Slam of Darts, with come from behind wins against Simon Whitlock in the quarter-finals and surviving match darts to win 16–15, against Mensur Suljović 16–12 in the semi-finals, and against Gary Anderson 16–13 in a highly controversial final that was marked by a confrontation between the two players. With his Grand Slam of Darts victory, Price was the first Welshman to win a PDC televised major.

=== 2019 ===
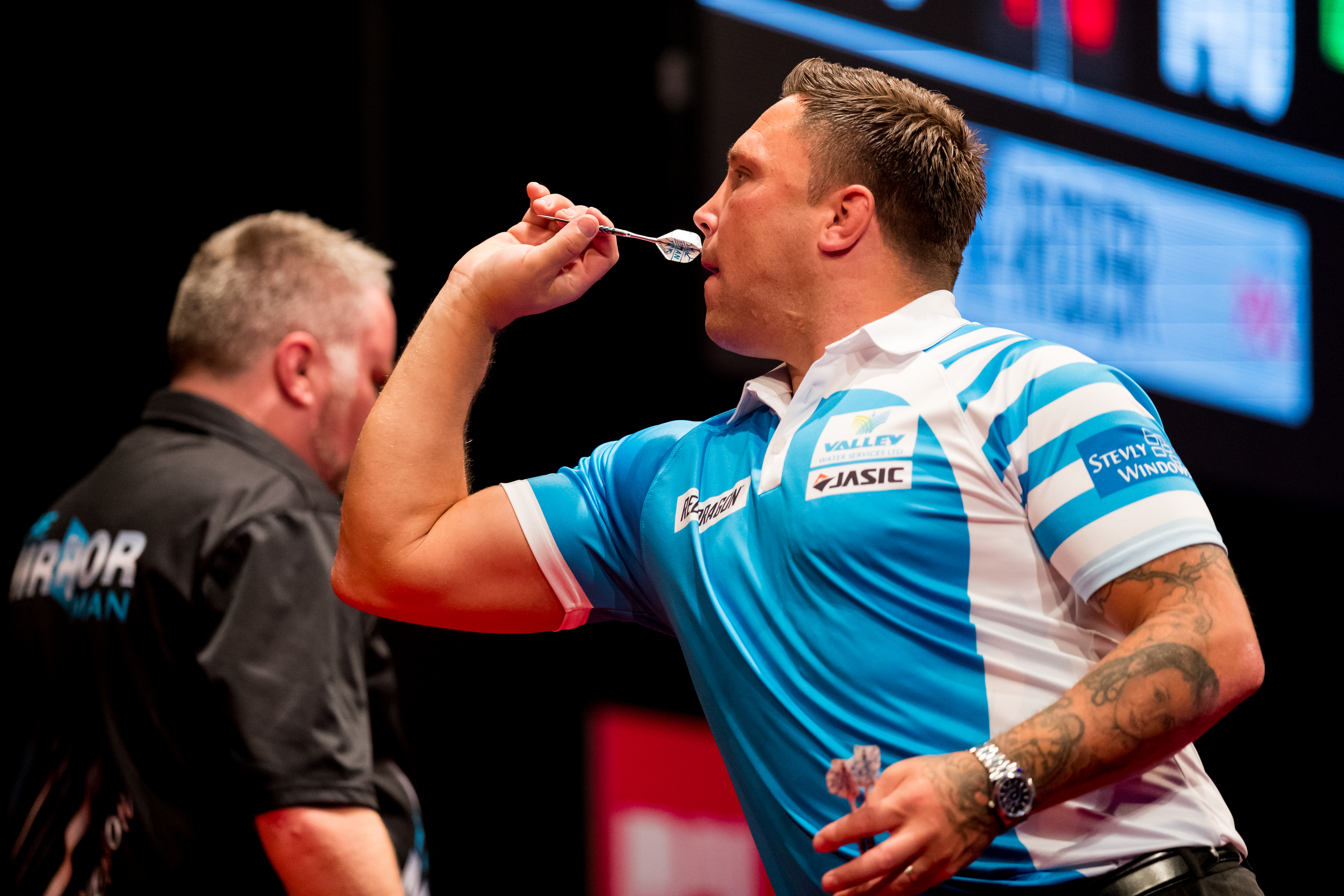
Price during the 2019 European Darts Matchplay

In the 2019 World Championship, Price lost 3–2 to Nathan Aspinall in the second round despite leading 2–0 in sets. In January 2019, Gerwyn Price was hit with a record fine by the Darts Regulation Authority due to his actions at the 2018 Grand Slam of Darts. In total he was fined £21,500 for his actions during his victory at the Grand Slam of Darts. He was fined £12,000 for gamesmanship in the final of the Grand Slam of Darts against Gary Anderson. He was fined £8,000 for gamesmanship in his quarter-final game against Simon Whitlock. He was also fined £1,500 for social media posts following his events, which were directed towards the beaten finalist Gary Anderson. His fine was reduced on appeal to a total of £11,500.

Gerwyn's second Premier League Darts campaign saw him just miss out on a play-off spot, as he finished 5th.

In October 2019, Price reached the final of the European Championship beating Ted Evetts, Nathan Aspinall, Vincent van der Voort and Michael Smith on the way. However, he lost the final to Rob Cross 11–6.

In November 2019, Price successfully defended his Grand Slam of Darts title beating Peter Wright 16–6 in the final after defeating Gary Anderson in the quarter-final and recording his first career win over Michael van Gerwen in the semi-final. Price then reached the final of the Players Championship Finals, where he was the top seed due to his performances on the Pro Tour. He was narrowly beaten 11–9 by Michael van Gerwen after missing four darts to take the match into a deciding leg.

=== 2020 ===
Price's 2019 season meant he entered the 2020 World Championship as the second favourite behind van Gerwen. He reached the semi-finals by defeating three-time BDO world champion Glen Durrant, but he was eventually defeated, in a heated encounter 6–3 by Peter Wright, who went on to win the title.

In March Price reached the 2020 UK Open final, his second UK Open final, losing to Michael van Gerwen 11–9. Price won two televised titles for the first time in 2020; winning the World Series of Darts Finals with a win over Rob Cross and winning the World Grand Prix by beating Dirk van Duijvenbode 5–2 in the final.

=== 2021: World Champion ===
Price went into the 2021 World Championship as third seed. He came through a last set decider against fellow Welshman Jamie Lewis and a sudden death last leg decider against 30th seed Brendan Dolan to reach the fourth round, where he won 4–1 against Mervyn King to reach the quarter-finals for the second consecutive year. He then beat Daryl Gurney in another last leg decider and beat Stephen Bunting 6–4 to set up a final clash with Gary Anderson. Price beat Anderson 7–3 to win his first PDC World Championship, and replaced Michael van Gerwen as world number one. He also became the first Welshman ever to win the PDC world championship, although Leighton Rees, Richie Burnett, Mark Webster and Wayne Warren had previously won the BDO version of the championship.

In April, Price was ruled out of the Premier League due to testing positive for COVID-19. During the 2021 UK Open, Price made it to the semi-finals losing 11–6 in legs to eventual winner James Wade. Wade would also take Price's place in the Premier League following his positive COVID test. At the 2021 World Matchplay in July, he lost in the quarter-finals to Dimitri Van den Bergh. Price reached his first major final since the World Championship at the World Grand Prix which he lost to fellow Welshman Jonny Clayton 5–1 in sets.

In November 2021, Price won his third Grand Slam of Darts title by beating Peter Wright 16–8 in the final.

=== 2022 ===
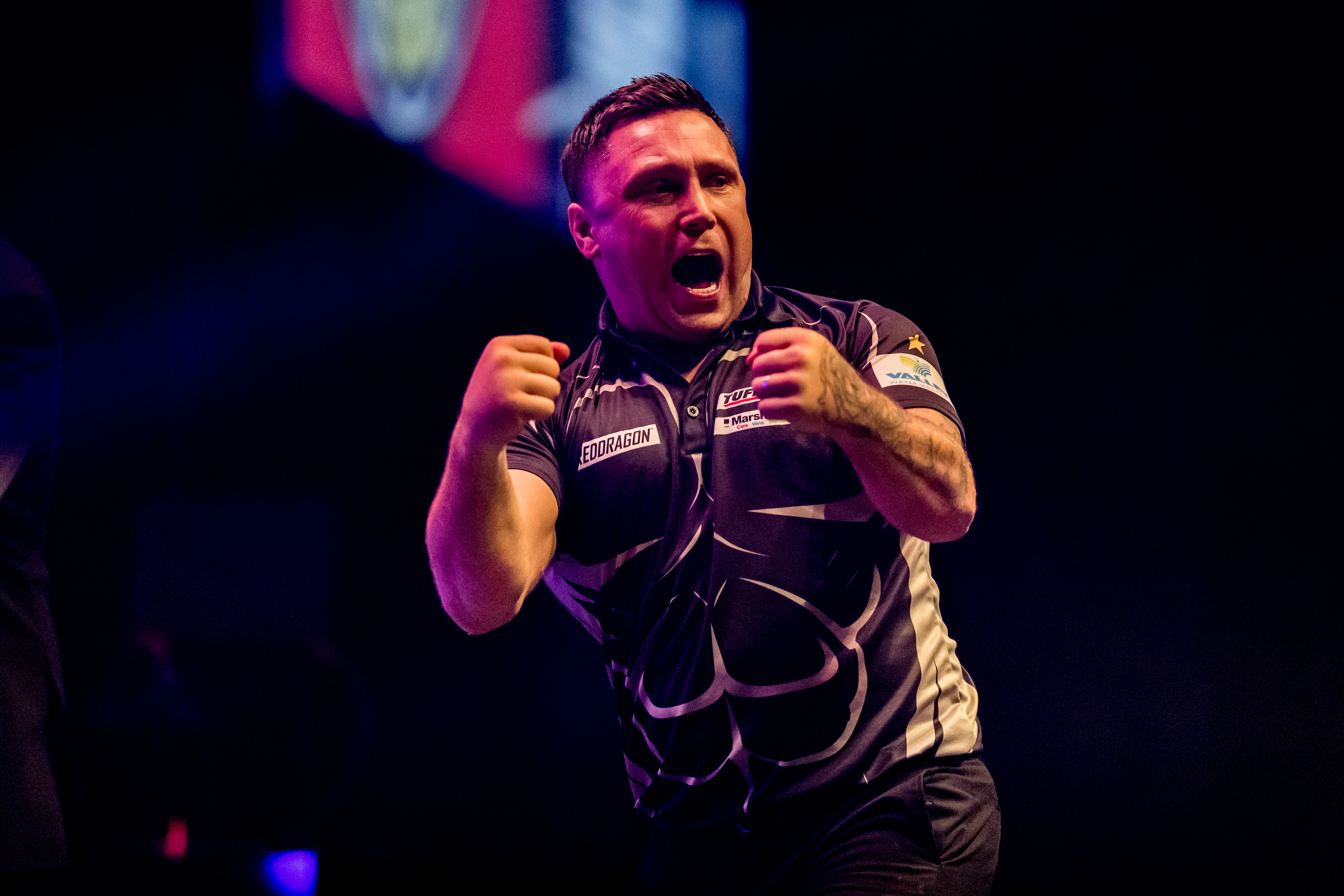
Price at a darts exhibition event in Mannheim

In the 2022 World Championship, Price began the defence of his world title against Ritchie Edhouse, winning 3–1. In the quarter-finals, Price hit a nine-dart finish against Michael Smith, but went on to lose the match 5–4.

On night three of the Premier League in Belfast on 17 February, Price hit two nine-darters in the same night, achieving his first against Michael van Gerwen in the semi-final and then a second in his victory against James Wade in the final. Ten days later, he won his only European Tour title of the year at the International Darts Open. In June, Price and Welsh teammate Jonny Clayton reached the final of the World Cup of Darts, but they were beaten 3–1 by Australia. At the World Matchplay, Price made it to his first final at the tournament, hitting a nine-darter against Danny Noppert along the way. He lost the final 18–14 to Michael van Gerwen.

During the 2022 World Series of Darts, Price picked up a title at the New Zealand Masters, defeating Jonny Clayton 8–4 in the final. In September, he won his second World Series of Darts Finals with an 11–10 win in the final against Dirk van Duijvenbode.

=== 2023 ===
In the 2023 World Championship, Price reached the quarter-finals. His quarter-final tie against Gabriel Clemens became known for Price's decision to wear ear defenders and later earplugs due to him being affected by noise from the crowd. Clemens won the match 5–1.

Price bounced back following his world championship defeat by winning back-to-back European Tour titles at the European Darts Open and the International Darts Open. In the 2023 Premier League, Price ended the league phase with four night wins, topping the table and advancing to the play-offs for the first time. He beat Jonny Clayton 10–2 in the semi-finals but suffered defeat in the final, losing 11–5 to Michael van Gerwen.

In June, he won the World Cup of Darts for the second time with Jonny Clayton as Wales beat Scotland 10–2 in the final. In October, he reached the final of the World Grand Prix, but lost 5–2 to Luke Humphries.

=== 2024 ===
Price beat Connor Scutt in his opening match of the 2024 World Championship, before losing 4–2 to Brendan Dolan in the third round.

On 1 February, the PDC announced that Price withdrew from the 2024 Masters due to family reasons. In a third-round match against Brendan Dolan at Players Championship 1, Price withdrew during the match, unhappy with the playing conditions. In April, he reached the final of the International Darts Open, but was unable to win the event for the fifth time as he was defeated 8–5 by Martin Schindler. During the Premier League, Price hit a nine-darter against Michael Smith on night ten. At the end of the league stage, he finished in seventh place. On 26 June, the PDC announced that Price had been ruled out of the 2024 PDC World Cup of Darts as he was dealing with health issues, meaning he was unable to defend the 2023 title he won with Jonny Clayton. In November, Price failed to qualify for the Grand Slam of Darts after being eliminated in the qualifier by Mickey Mansell, missing the event for the first time since 2015.

Despite a lack of good results throughout 2024, Price won two titles during the 2024 World Series of Darts. He won the Nordic Darts Masters by beating Rob Cross 8–5 in the final and followed that by beating Luke Littler 8–1 in the final of the Australian Darts Masters.

=== 2025 ===
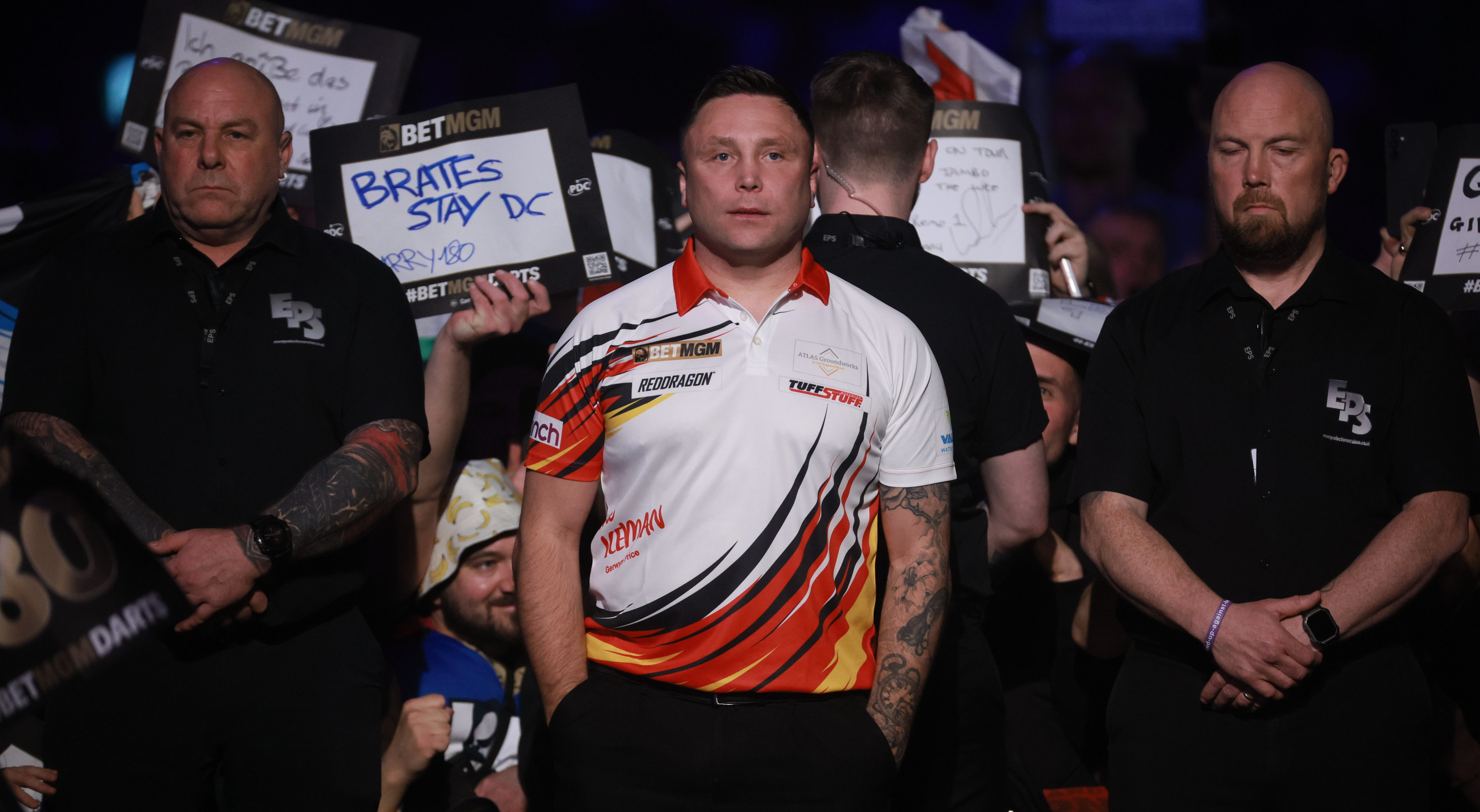
Price on night nine of the 2025 Premier League

At the 2025 World Championship, Price reached the quarter-finals. This run included a sudden death win over Joe Cullen in the third round. Price led the match 3–0 but Cullen won the next three sets to level the match at 3–3 and force a last-set decider. The two went the full distance in the last set until Price won in a last-leg decider, with the match being described as a "thriller" and an "Alexandra Palace classic". He was eliminated in the quarter-finals following a 5–3 loss to Chris Dobey.

Price won the second Pro Tour event of the year, Players Championship 2 (PC2), by defeating Dobey in a deciding leg 8–7 in the final. He claimed another two titles at PC9 and PC12, beating Ian White and Josh Rock in the respective finals. He claimed his first Premier League nightly win of the year on night three in Dublin, beating world champion Luke Littler and world number one Luke Humphries before a 6–3 win against Nathan Aspinall in the final. He earned a second nightly win on night six with a 6–3 win against Littler in the final, extending his winning streak against Littler to six matches. He achieved his third nightly win of the season on night 12. He also hit two nine-dart finishes during his Premier League campaign; his first on night 10 made him the player with the most nine-darters in Premier League history, while his second came on night 15. He qualified for the play-offs by finishing fourth in the league stage table with 24 points. On Finals Night on 29 May, he lost 10–7 to Littler in the semi-finals.

After withdrawing from the previous year's tournament, Price represented Wales at the World Cup of Darts alongside Jonny Clayton and the duo reached the final, but they were narrowly defeated in the final 10–9 by Northern Ireland. Price won his fourth World Series title at the Poland Darts Masters, defeating Stephen Bunting 8–7 in the final. He claimed his first European Tour title in two years at the Baltic Sea Darts Open, where he won the final 8–3 against Gary Anderson. He won his fourth Players Championship title of the year at PC26 with an 8–5 victory over Gian van Veen in the final. Price was a semi-finalist at the World Series Finals, the Grand Slam, and the Players Championship Finals.

=== 2026 ===
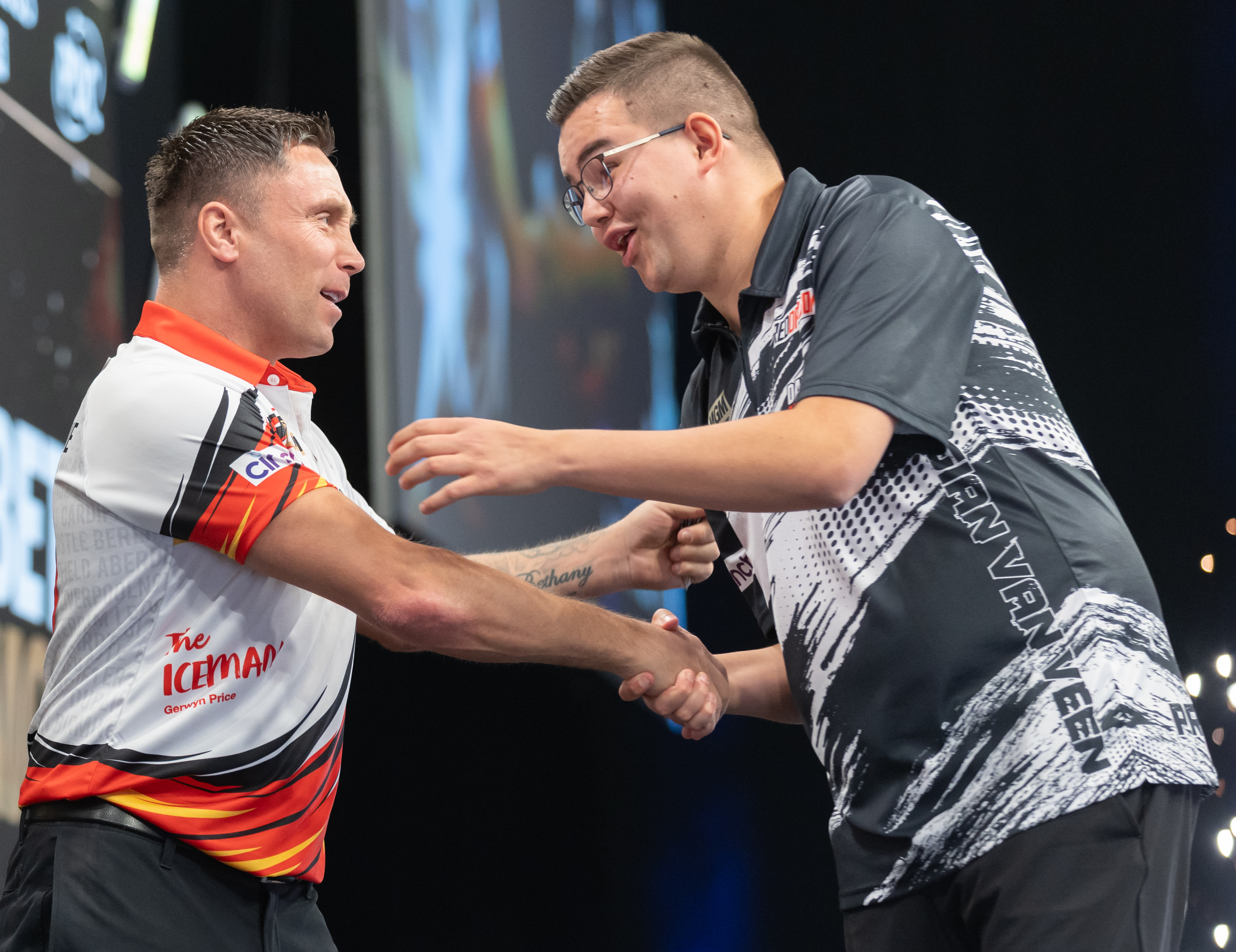
Price and Gian van Veen shaking hands on night eight of the 2026 Premier League

After winning his opening match 3–0 against Adam Gawlas, Price exited the 2026 World Championship in the second round, suffering a shock 3–0 defeat to Wesley Plaisier. At the World Masters, he missed a match dart to reach the final of the tournament, losing 5–4 in the semi-finals to eventual champion Luke Littler. He won his first title of the year at Players Championship 6, defeating Andrew Gilding 8–1 in the final. He reached the semi-finals of the UK Open in March, where he was beaten 11–8 by James Wade.

Price became the second player to win ten European Tour titles, after Michael van Gerwen, with his victory at the European Darts Grand Prix, where he triumphed 8–6 against Ross Smith in the final. He achieved two nightly wins during the Premier League, earning victories on nights two and nine. He qualified for the play-offs by finishing the league stage in fourth place with 26 points. On Finals Night on 28 May, he staged a comeback from 9–4 down to take Luke Littler to a deciding leg, but lost the semi-final match 10–9. At the World Matchplay, Price reached his first major singles final since 2023 by defeating Gian van Veen 17–10 in the semi-finals. He lost the final 18–9 to Littler, but rose to world number four and reclaimed his position as the Welsh number one by overtaking Jonny Clayton.

== Boxing ==
On 16 February 2022, Price announced on Instagram his debut boxing fight which was originally scheduled for 9 April 2022 against Rhys Evans at Valley Tavern, Blackwood, Wales. The boxing fight was later delayed due to injury and scheduled for 13 May 2022. Price later announced he would no longer be taking part in the event stating "I've pulled out of boxing now. On medical advice, Ive been advised not to do it."

Price called out YouTuber-turned-professional boxer Jake Paul to a fight after claiming he could knock Paul out with one single punch. Price revealed that Paul responded back to his callout, asking him to "name a price."

== Personal life ==
While his official darting nickname is "the Iceman", Price is often nicknamed "Gezzy". He is married to Bethan, and the couple have two children. Following Price's controversial victory in the 2018 Grand Slam of Darts final, he spoke out about how his then-12-year-old daughter had received online abuse on Twitter. He called on his own followers to report the troll, and said that he wanted the culprit "kicked off of Twitter".

In 2003, Price was found guilty of an unprovoked attack on a stranger in a pub in Blackwood. In 2010, Price was punched outside a pub in Bargoed, causing an injury which required 42 stitches to his forehead and five to his chin, as well as suffering a brain haemorrhage and nerve damage to an eyebrow. His attacker, Owen Body, received a 12-month jail term. Price also received a suspended jail sentence for assaulting Body on the same evening.

Outside of darts, Price owns a fish and chip shop in Markham.

Ahead of the 2025 Caerphilly by-election, Price expressed his support for Reform UK. He reiterated his support for Reform UK ahead of the 2026 Senedd election.

== World Championship results ==
=== PDC World Championship ===
- 2015: First round (lost to Peter Wright 0–3)
- 2016: First round (lost to Andrew Gilding 0–3)
- 2017: First round (lost to Jonny Clayton 1–3)
- 2018: Third round (lost to Michael van Gerwen 2–4)
- 2019: Second round (lost to Nathan Aspinall 2–3)
- 2020: Semi-finals (lost to Peter Wright 3–6)
- 2021: Winner (beat Gary Anderson 7–3)
- 2022: Quarter-finals (lost to Michael Smith 4–5)
- 2023: Quarter-finals (lost to Gabriel Clemens 1–5)
- 2024: Third round (lost to Brendan Dolan 2–4)
- 2025: Quarter-finals (lost to Chris Dobey 3–5)
- 2026: Second round (lost to Wesley Plaisier 0–3)

== Career finals ==
=== PDC major finals: 19 (8 titles) ===
Legend
World Championship (1–0)
World Matchplay (0–2)
World Grand Prix (1–2)
Grand Slam (4–0)
Premier League (0–1)
UK Open (0–2)
European Championship (0–1)
Players Championship Finals (0–1)
World Series Finals (2–1)

Outcome	No.	Year	Championship	Opponent in the final	Score (Note: (l) = score in legs, (s) = score in sets, (m) = score in matches.)
Runner-up	1.	2017	UK Open	Peter Wright	6–11 (l)
Winner	1.	2018	Grand Slam	Gary Anderson	16–13 (l)
Runner-up	2.	2019	European Championship	Rob Cross	6–11 (l)
Winner	2.	2019	Grand Slam (2)	Peter Wright	16–6 (l)
Runner-up	3.	2019	Players Championship Finals	Michael van Gerwen	9–11 (l)
Runner-up	4.	2020	UK Open (2)	Michael van Gerwen	9–11 (l)
Winner	3.	2020	World Grand Prix	Dirk van Duijvenbode	5–2 (s)
Winner	4.	2020	World Series Finals	Rob Cross	11–9 (l)
Winner	5.	2021	World Championship	Gary Anderson	7–3 (s)
Runner-up	5.	2021	World Grand Prix	Jonny Clayton	1–5 (s)
Winner	6.	2021	Grand Slam (3)	Peter Wright	16–8 (l)
Runner-up	6.	2022	World Matchplay	Michael van Gerwen	14–18 (l)
Winner	7.	2022	World Series Finals (2)	Dirk van Duijvenbode	11–10 (l)
Runner-up	7.	2023	Premier League	Michael van Gerwen	5–11 (l)
Runner-up	8.	2023	World Grand Prix (2)	Luke Humphries	2–5 (s)
Runner-up	9.	2026	World Matchplay	Luke Littler	9–18 (l)
Runner-up	10	2026	World Series Finals	Ross Smith	5–11 (l)
Runner-up	11	2026	World Grand Prix (3)	Luke Humphries	4–6 (s)
Winner	8.	2026	Grand Slam (4)	Gian van Veen	16–11 (l)

=== PDC World Series finals: 10 (4 titles) ===
Outcome	No.	Year	Championship	Opponent in the final	Score
Runner-up	1.	2022	Queensland Masters	Michael van Gerwen	5–8 (l)
Winner	1.	2022	New Zealand Masters	Jonny Clayton	8–4 (l)
Runner-up	2.	2023	Bahrain Masters	Michael Smith	6–8 (l)
Runner-up	3.	2023	Nordic Masters	Peter Wright	5–11 (l)
Runner-up	4.	2024	US Masters	Rob Cross	7–8 (l)
Winner	2.	2024	Nordic Masters	Rob Cross	8–5 (l)
Winner	3.	2024	Australian Masters	Luke Littler	8–1 (l)
Runner-up	5.	2025	Bahrain Masters (2)	Stephen Bunting	4–8 (l)
Winner	4.	2025	Poland Masters	Stephen Bunting	8–7 (l)
Runner-up	6.	2026	New Zealand Masters	Jonny Clayton	4–8 (l)

=== PDC team finals: 5 (2 titles) ===
Outcome	No.	Year	Championship	Team	Teammate	Opponents in the final	Score
Runner-up	1.	2017	World Cup	Wales	Mark Webster	Netherlands – Michael van Gerwen and Raymond van Barneveld	1–3 (m)
Winner	1.	2020	World Cup	Wales	Jonny Clayton	England – Michael Smith and Rob Cross	3–0 (m)
Runner-up	2.	2022	World Cup (2)	Wales	Jonny Clayton	Australia – Damon Heta and Simon Whitlock	1–3 (m)
Winner	2.	2023	World Cup (2)	Wales	Jonny Clayton	Scotland – Peter Wright and Gary Anderson	10–2 (l)
Runner-up	3.	2025	World Cup (3)	Wales	Jonny Clayton	Northern Ireland – Daryl Gurney and Josh Rock	9–10 (l)

== Performance timeline ==
Performance Table Legend
W	Won the tournament	F	Finalist	SF	Semifinalist	QF	Quarterfinalist	#R; RR; Prel.	Lost in # round Round-robin; Preliminary round	DQ	Disqualified
DNQ	Did not qualify	DNP	Did not participate	WD	Withdrew	NH	Tournament not held	#R; RR; Prel.	Lost in # round Round-robin; Preliminary round	NYF	Not yet founded

=== PDC ===
Tournament	2014	2015	2016	2017	2018	2019	2020	2021	2022	2023	2024	2025	2026
PDC Ranked televised events
World Championship	DNP	1R	1R	1R	3R	2R	SF	W	QF	QF	3R	QF	2R
World Masters (Note: A non-ranked event until 2025.)	Did not qualify				QF	1R	QF	SF	QF	2R	WD	2R	SF
UK Open	2R	Prel.	3R	F	QF	SF	F	SF	QF	5R	4R	4R	SF
World Matchplay	DNQ	QF	2R	1R	1R	1R	1R	QF	F	2R	2R	QF	F
World Grand Prix	DNQ	1R	1R	2R	QF	1R	W	F	SF	F	2R	QF	F
European Championship	DNQ	1R	2R	2R	QF	F	2R	QF	1R	QF	1R	1R	SF
Grand Slam (Note: Became a ranking event in 2015.)	DNQ		2R	RR	W	W	2R	W	QF	2R	DNQ	SF	W
Players Championship Finals	DNQ	2R	1R	2R	1R	F	SF	3R	1R	2R	1R	SF	
PDC Non-ranked televised events
Premier League	Did not participate				10th	5th	5th	WD	7th	F	7th	SF	SF
World Cup	DNQ		2R	F	QF	1R	W	SF	F	W	WD	F	DNP
World Series Finals	NH	DNQ	2R	QF	SF	2R	W	QF	W	2R	2R	SF	F
Past major events
Champions League	NH		DNQ			SF	NH						
Career statistics
Year-end ranking	76	33	19	16	6	3	3	1	4	5	10	12	

==== European Tour ====
Season	1	2	3	4	5	6	7	8	9	10	11	12	13	14	15
2014	Did not qualify					EDO; 2R	EDG; DNQ	EDT; QF							
2015	GDC; DNQ	GDT; QF	GDM; DNQ	DDM; 1R	IDO; DNQ	EDO; 1R	EDT; 1R	EDM; 1R	EDG; 3R						
2016	DDM; 2R	GDM; DNQ	GDT; 2R	EDM; DNQ	ADO; 2R	EDO; 3R	IDO; 2R	EDT; QF	EDG; QF	GDC; 2R					
2017	GDC; SF	GDM; 3R	GDO; QF	EDG; 3R	GDT; 2R	DNP		EDO; QF	DDM; 2R	GDG; 3R	IDO; QF	EDT; 2R			
2018	EDO; 2R	GDG; 2R	GDO; QF	ADO; F	EDG; 2R	DDM; 3R	GDT; QF	DDO; 3R	EDM; QF	GDC; 2R	DDC; 2R	IDO; W	EDT; 2R		
2019	EDO; QF	GDC; QF	GDG; WD	GDO; QF	ADO; QF	EDG; 3R	DDM; SF	DDO; SF	CDO; 3R	ADC; 3R	EDM; 3R	IDO; W	GDT; QF		
2020	BDC; W	GDC; 2R	EDG; 3R	IDO; 2R											
2021	HDT; W	GDT; W													
2022	IDO; W	Withdrew			EDO; 3R	CDO; 2R	EDG; WD	DDC; 2R	EDM; 2R	HDT; WD	GDO; QF	BDO; WD	GDT; 2R		
2023	BSD; 3R	EDO; W	IDO; W	GDG; 3R	Did not participate				EDG; 3R	DNP		HDT; SF	GDC; WD		
2024	BDO; SF	GDG; SF	IDO; F	EDG; 3R	WD		DDC; QF	EDO; 2R	GDC; 2R	FDT; 2R	HDT; 2R	SDT; 2R	CDO; WD		
2025	BDO; QF	EDT; QF	IDO; 3R	GDG; 3R	ADO; WD	EDG; 2R	DDC; WD	EDO; DNP	BSD; W	FDT; WD	CDO; QF	HDT; QF	SDT; WD	GDC; 3R	
2026	PDO; WD	EDT; F	BDO; WD	GDG; WD	EDG; W	ADO; DNP	IDO; WD	BSD; WD	SDO; 2R	EDO; WD	HDT; WD	CDO; SF	FDT; 3R	SDT; WD	DDC; 3R

==== Players Championships ====
Season	1	2	3	4	5	6	7	8	9	10	11	12	13	14	15	16	17	18	19	20	21	22	23	24	25	26	27	28	29	30	31	32	33	34
2014	BAR; 1R	BAR; 4R	CRA; 1R	CRA; 1R	WIG; 2R	WIG; 2R	WIG; 2R	WIG; 2R	CRA; 1R	CRA; 4R	COV; 2R	COV; 1R	CRA; QF	CRA; 2R	DUB; 1R	DUB; 1R	CRA; 2R	CRA; 2R	COV; SF	COV; 1R														
2015	BAR; 2R	BAR; QF	BAR; QF	BAR; 3R	BAR; 4R	COV; 1R	COV; 4R	COV; SF	CRA; QF	CRA; 2R	BAR; 3R	BAR; 2R	WIG; 4R	WIG; 3R	BAR; 1R	BAR; 3R	DUB; 4R	DUB; 1R	COV; 2R	COV; 1R														
2016	BAR; QF	BAR; 3R	BAR; 1R	BAR; SF	BAR; 4R	BAR; 1R	BAR; W	COV; W	COV; 3R	BAR; QF	BAR; 1R	BAR; QF	BAR; 1R	BAR; 4R	BAR; 1R	BAR; 3R	DUB; 2R	DUB; 3R	BAR; 2R	BAR; 1R														
2017	BAR; DNP		BAR; SF	BAR; 4R	MIL; 4R	MIL; 4R	BAR; SF	BAR; QF	WIG; 3R	WIG; 2R	MIL; DNP		WIG; 2R	WIG; 4R	BAR; DNP		BAR; QF	BAR; DNP	DUB; 4R	DUB; QF	BAR; QF	BAR; 1R												
2018	BAR; SF	BAR; 1R	BAR; 4R	BAR; DNP	MIL; 1R	MIL; 1R	BAR; 3R	BAR; QF	WIG; 3R	WIG; 3R	MIL; 3R	MIL; 2R	WIG; DNP		BAR; 1R	BAR; 1R	BAR; 2R	BAR; QF	DUB; 3R	DUB; 1R	BAR; DNP													
2019	WIG; 2R	WIG; 2R	WIG; 3R	WIG; SF	BAR; W	BAR; W	WIG; SF	WIG; 2R	BAR; DNP		BAR; 1R	BAR; 4R	BAR; 2R	BAR; 4R	BAR; DNP		WIG; 4R	WIG; DNP	BAR; 1R	BAR; 4R	HIL; DNP		BAR; F	BAR; 4R	BAR; 4R	BAR; 2R	DUB; W	DUB; SF	BAR; QF	BAR; SF				
2020	BAR; 3R	BAR; F	WIG; 1R	WIG; DNP	WIG; F	WIG; W	BAR; DNP		MIL; 2R	MIL; 3R	MIL; 4R	MIL; 3R	MIL; F	NIE; 3R	NIE; QF	NIE; 3R	NIE; W	NIE; W	COV; 2R	COV; 3R	COV; W	COV; DNP												
2021	BOL; 2R	BOL; 2R	BOL; DNP		MIL; 3R	MIL; W	MIL; 2R	MIL; F	NIE; DNP				MIL; F	MIL; 1R	MIL; 3R	MIL; QF	COV; SF	COV; 4R	COV; 3R	COV; QF	BAR; W	BAR; 3R	BAR; 4R	BAR; Did not participate										
2022	BAR; 2R	BAR; F	WIG; 1R	WIG; SF	BAR; DNP		NIE; W	NIE; 3R	BAR; 3R	BAR; 2R	BAR; 4R	BAR; 4R	BAR; 2R	Did not participate				BAR; 2R	BAR; 2R	BAR; DNP		BAR; 4R	BAR; 2R	BAR; DNP	BAR; SF	BAR; SF	BAR; 1R	BAR; DNP	BAR; W	BAR; DNP				
2023	BAR; DNP		BAR; SF	BAR; 1R	BAR; SF	BAR; 1R	HIL; 1R	HIL; SF	WIG; DNP		LEI; QF	LEI; 4R	HIL; QF	HIL; 1R	LEI; DNP		HIL; W	HIL; W	BAR; 1R	BAR; 3R	BAR; W	BAR; DNP			BAR; 4R	BAR; F	BAR; DNP		BAR; W	BAR; DNP				
2024	WIG; 3R	WIG; DNP	LEI; 2R	LEI; 4R	HIL; DNP		LEI; 1R	LEI; 4R	HIL; DNP		HIL; 4R	HIL; 2R	MIL; 2R	MIL; 3R	MIL; 1R	MIL; 2R	MIL; 3R	MIL; DNP		WIG; SF	WIG; 4R	LEI; 2R	LEI; 2R	WIG; DNP			WIG; F	WIG; 2R	LEI; DNP					
2025	WIG; 2R	WIG; W	ROS; QF	ROS; 3R	LEI; 1R	LEI; 4R	HIL; DNP		LEI; W	LEI; 1R	LEI; 1R	LEI; W	ROS; 1R	ROS; 4R	DNP			LEI; 1R	LEI; 1R	LEI; SF	LEI; F	Did not participate				HIL; W	HIL; F	LEI; 3R	LEI; 2R	DNP			WIG; QF	WIG; DNP
2026	HIL; 2R	HIL; F	WIG; 1R	WIG; SF	LEI; 1R	LEI; W	Did not participate														WIG; 1R	WIG; 2R	LEI; 1R	Did not participate									LEI; QF	LEI; DNP

==== World Series ====
Season	1	2	3	4	5	6	7
2017	DUB; SF	SHA; QF	USA; SF	Did not participate			
2018	GER; DNP	USA; 1R	SHA; QF	Did not participate			
2019	USA; SF	Did not participate					
2021	NOR; QF						
2022	USA; SF	NOR; QF	DUT; 1R	QUE; F	NSW; SF	NZE; W	
2023	BAH; F	NOR; F	USA; QF	POL; SF	NSW; SF	NZE; QF	
2024	BAH; SF	DUT; SF	USA; F	NOR; W	POL; DNP	AUS; W	NZE; QF
2025	BAH; F	DUT; SF	NOR; SF	USA; SF	POL; W	AUS; QF	NZE; SF
2026	BAH; SF	KSA; SF	NOR; QF	USA; QF	NZE; F	AUS; SF	

Performance Table Legend
W	Won the tournament	F	Finalist	SF	Semifinalist	QF	Quarterfinalist	#R; RR; Prel.	Lost in # round Round-robin; Preliminary round	DQ	Disqualified
DNQ	Did not qualify	DNP	Did not participate	WD	Withdrew	NH	Tournament not held	#R; RR; Prel.	Lost in # round Round-robin; Preliminary round	NYF	Not yet founded

== Nine-dart finishes ==
Gerwyn Price televised nine-dart finishes
Date	Opponent	Tournament	Method
1 January 2022	(England) Michael Smith	PDC World Championship	3 x T20; 3 x T20; T19, T20, D12
17 February 2022	(Netherlands) Michael van Gerwen	Premier League	2 x T20, T19; 3 x T20; 2 x T20, D12
17 February 2022	(England) James Wade	Premier League	3 x T20; 3 x T20; T19, T20, D12
23 July 2022	(Netherlands) Danny Noppert	World Matchplay	3 x T20; 3 x T20; T19, T20, D12
4 April 2024	(England) Michael Smith	Premier League	3 x T20; 3 x T20; T19, T20, D12
10 April 2025	(England) Luke Littler	Premier League	3 x T20; 3 x T20; T19, T20, D12
15 May 2025	(England) Stephen Bunting	Premier League	3 x T20; 3 x T20; T19, T20, D12

== Notes ==
Sporting positions
Preceded by Michael van Gerwen	PDC World Number One; 3 January 2021 – 6 March 2022	Succeeded by Peter Wright
Preceded by Peter Wright	PDC World Number One; 24 July 2022 – 9 October 2022	Succeeded by Peter Wright
Preceded by Peter Wright	PDC World Number One; 30 October 2022 – 3 January 2023	Succeeded by Michael Smith
Awards
Preceded by Michael van Gerwen	PDC Player of the Year; 2020	Succeeded by Peter Wright
