= Palmerbet =

Australian online gambling platform

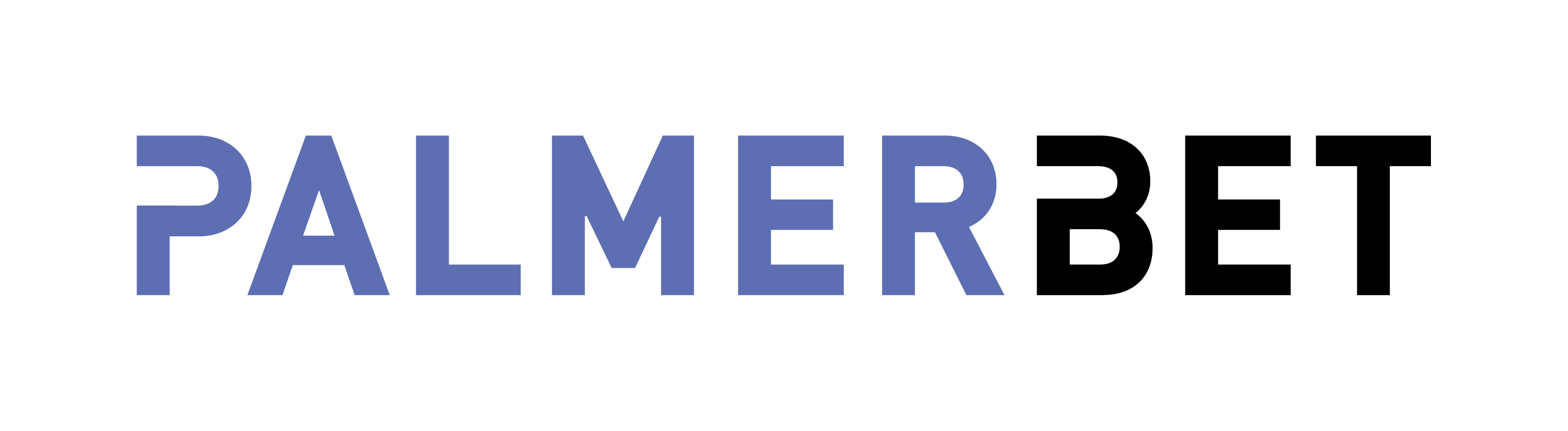
- Company type: Private
- Industry: Gambling
- Founded: August 2013; 12 years ago
- Founder: Andrew Palmer, Grant Palmer, Matthew Palmer, Adrian Palmer
- Headquarters: Sydney, Australia
- Area served: Australia
- Key people: Andrew Palmer, Grant Palmer, Matthew Palmer, Adrian Palmer (Founding Directors)
- Products: Betting odds, promotions, tips and insights, betting products
- Owner: Andrew Palmer, Grant Palmer, Matthew Palmer, Adrian Palmer
- Number of employees: 100+
- Website: palmerbet.com

Palmerbet is an Australian online gambling company founded in August 2013 by Andrew, Grant, Matthew, and Adrian Palmer in Sydney, Australia.

Palmerbet has all Australian horse racing, sports and entertainment markets, including Melbourne Cup, Queen Elizabeth Stakes, Australian Football League, National Rugby League, along with all major international events such as English Premier League, National Basketball Association, etc.

== History ==
In 2013, Andrew, Grant, Matthew, and Adrian Palmer established Palmer Bookmaking Pty Ltd, which was later rebranded as Palmerbet. In 2016, Palmerbet received the EGR Rising Star award. In 2020, Palmerbet secured a three year sponsorship deals with the NRL teams Newcastle Knights and Canberra Raiders. In 2024, the Newcastle Knights partnership was renewed for an additional five years.

In 2021, Palmerbet extended its sponsorship activities by supporting biggest Australian boxing events. In 2022 and 2023, Palmerbet ventured into sponsoring the PDC darts, their first Australian tour since the pandemic.

On 12 July 2024, Palmerbet and the Canberra Raiders presented a $16,545 donation to the Canberra Hospital Foundation, supporting the Centenary Hospital for Women and Children. The funds were raised by auctioning signed Raiders jerseys from a match in Christchurch, where Palmerbet had donated their jersey branding rights to the Foundation.

== Sponsorships ==
In November 2021, Palmerbet became the Official Wagering Partner of the Newcastle Knights, signing a three-year deal that included jersey branding and community engagement initiatives. In 2024, the partnership was renewed for an additional five years.

In August 2022, Palmerbet became the title sponsor for the Australian leg of the PDC World Series of Darts, covering the Queensland and New South Wales Darts Masters events. This partnership continued into 2023, with Palmerbet again sponsoring the New South Wales Darts Masters held in Wollongong.

In 2023, Palmerbet replaced its logo on the Canberra Raiders' jerseys with the Canberra Hospital Foundation's branding for a match in New Zealand, due to local advertising restrictions on gambling.

In September 2024, Palmerbet launched a Punters Club for the $5 million Golden Slipper Stakes, allowing groups to join together and place shared bets.

== Activities ==
Palmerbet primarily operates as an online gambling platform, providing betting odds, promotions, insights, and other betting products in Australia. The company's headquarters are located on Canterbury Park Racecourse in Sydney. Palmerbet operates within the regulations set by Australian regulatory authorities at the federal and state levels.
