= 2020 World Series of Darts =

Darts tournament

The 2020 World Series of Darts was a series of planned televised darts tournaments organised by the Professional Darts Corporation. In 2020, there were set to be 5 World Series events and one finals event, which for 2020 was moved from Amsterdam, Netherlands to Salzburg, Austria. Due to the COVID-19 pandemic no events were held before the 2020 finals, with five scheduled events postponed to 2021.

Two new venues were due to make their debuts with New York City replacing Las Vegas for the US Darts Masters, and Copenhagen being the venue for the inaugural 2020 Nordic Darts Masters, which replaced the German Darts Masters.

The two Australian events were moved to new cities in Wollongong and Townsville.

Fallon Sherrock was set to appear at all 5 World Series events as a PDC representative, making her the first woman to participate in any World Series event. She made an appearance at the finals.

The US leg was moved to 2021 on 1 April 2020 due to the COVID-19 pandemic and on 8 April 2020, all three Oceanic events were moved to 2021 for the same reason. The Nordic Darts Masters was also moved to 2021, having been initially delayed to October.

The 2020 World Series of Darts Finals went ahead as scheduled on 18–20 September, but with no tournaments before the finals the field consisted of the top eight in the PDC Order of Merit who were seeded, twelve more invited players and four players from a qualifier held in Hildesheim, Germany on 11 September.

== Prize money ==
=== International events ===
| Stage | Prize money |
|---|---|
| Winner | £20,000 |
| Runner-up | £10,000 |
| Semi-finals | £5,000 |
| Quarter-finals | £2,500 |
| First round | £1,250 |

=== Finals ===
| Stage | Prize money |
|---|---|
| Winner | £70,000 |
| Runner-up | £30,000 |
| Semi-finals | £20,000 |
| Quarter-finals | £15,000 |
| Second round | £7,500 |
| First round | £5,000 |

== World Series events ==
| No. | Date | Event | Venue | Champion | Legs | Runner-up | Ref |
|---|---|---|---|---|---|---|---|
| 1 | 5–6 June | US Masters | (United States) New York City, Hulu Theater | Cancelled | | | |
| 2 | 14–15 August | New South Wales Masters | (Australia) Wollongong, WIN Entertainment Centre | Cancelled | | | |
| 3 | 21–22 August | New Zealand Masters | (New Zealand) Hamilton, Claudelands Arena | Cancelled | | | |
| 4 | 28–29 August | Queensland Masters | (Australia) Townsville, Townsville Entertainment and Convention Centre | Cancelled | | | |
| 5 | 23–24 October | Nordic Masters | (Denmark) Copenhagen, Forum Copenhagen | Cancelled | | | |
| 6 | 18–20 September | World Series of Darts Finals | (Austria) Salzburg, Salzburgarena | Gerwyn Price (Wales) | 11 – 9 | (England) Rob Cross | |
