= 2023 Premier League Darts =

Darts competition

2023 Cazoo Premier League Darts

Tournament information
- Dates: 2 February – 25 May 2023

Champion(s)
- Michael van Gerwen (NED)

The 2023 Cazoo Premier League Darts was a darts tournament, organised by the Professional Darts Corporation – the nineteenth edition of the tournament. The event began on Thursday 2 February 2023, at the SSE Arena in Belfast, and finished with the play-offs, at The O_{2} Arena in London on Thursday 25 May 2023.

Michael van Gerwen was the defending champion after beating Joe Cullen 11–10 in the 2022 final. He successfully defended the title, beating Gerwyn Price 11–5 in the final.

== Format ==
As introduced in 2022's tournament, the 2023 Premier League Darts used an eight-person knockout bracket every night. Each of the seven matches was played over the best-of-11 legs. The players were guaranteed to meet each other once in the quarter-finals throughout the first seven weeks and once in the quarterfinals in weeks 9–15, with weeks 8 and 16 being drawn based on the league standings at that point. Players received two points per semi-final finish, three points per runner-up finish, and five points per final win.

Following the regular phase, the top four players in the league table contested the two knockout semi-finals with 1st playing 4th and 2nd playing 3rd.

== Venues ==
The 2023 tournament kept the same 17 venues used in the 2022 Premier League. On 8 October 2022, it was announced that Liverpool and Brighton were switching dates, after Liverpool had been awarded the hosting duties for the Eurovision Song Contest.

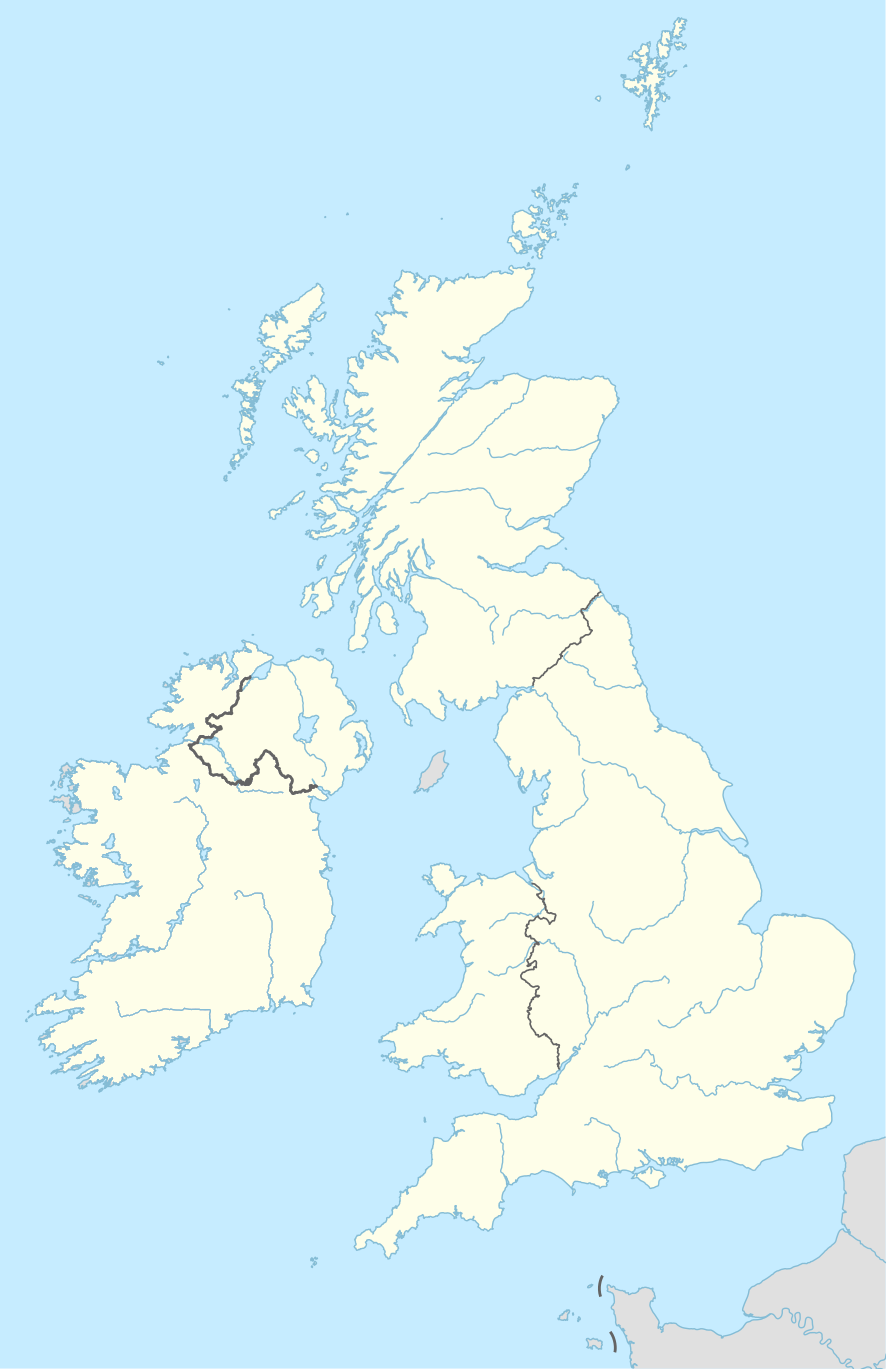
Locations of the 2023 Premier League venues in the UK and Ireland.
Other locations of the 2023 Premier League venues in Europe.

(Northern Ireland) Belfast	(Wales) Cardiff	(Scotland) Glasgow	(Republic of Ireland) Dublin
SSE Arena Belfast; Thursday 2 February	Cardiff International Arena; Thursday 9 February	OVO Hydro; Thursday 16 February	3Arena; Thursday 23 February
(England) Exeter	(England) Liverpool	(England) Nottingham	(England) Newcastle
Westpoint Exeter; Thursday 2 March	Liverpool Arena; Thursday 9 March	Nottingham Arena; Thursday 16 March	Newcastle Arena; Thursday 23 March
(Germany) Berlin	(England) Birmingham	(England) Brighton	(Netherlands) Rotterdam
Mercedes-Benz Arena; Thursday 30 March	Arena Birmingham; Thursday 6 April	Brighton Centre; Thursday 13 April	Rotterdam Ahoy; Thursday 20 April
(England) Leeds	(England) Manchester	(England) Sheffield	(Scotland) Aberdeen
Leeds Arena; Thursday 27 April	Manchester Arena; Thursday 4 May	Sheffield Arena; Thursday 11 May	P&J Live; Thursday 18 May
(England) London
The O_{2} Thursday 25 May

== Prize money ==
The prize money for the 2023 tournament remained at £1 million, including a £10,000 bonus to each night's winner.

Stage	Prize money
Winner	£275,000
Runner-up	£125,000
Semi-finalists (x2)	£85,000
5th place	£75,000
6th place	£70,000
7th place	£65,000
8th place	£60,000
Weekly Winner Bonus (x16)	£10,000
Total	£1,000,000

== Players ==
The format introduced in 2022 continued, which would encompass eight players, each playing against each other in a knockout tournament each night. The winner of each night received an additional £10,000 towards their prize money. Those who make it out of the last 8 each receive 2 points, the runner-up received 3 points and the winner received 5.

The top 4 players on the PDC Order of Merit automatically qualified, with the remaining four announced following the conclusion of the Masters on 29 January 2023.

Player	Appearance in Premier League	Consecutive Streak	Order of Merit Rank on 30/1/23	Previous best performance
Michael Smith	6th	2	1	Runner-up (2018)
Peter Wright	10th	10	2	Runner-up (2017)
Michael van Gerwen	11th	11	3	Winner (2013, 2016, 2017, 2018, 2019, 2022)
Gerwyn Price	5th	2 (Note: Price qualified for the 2021 Premier League Darts, but withdrew following a positive COVID-19 test.)	4	5th place (2019, 2020)
Jonny Clayton	3rd	3	7	Winner (2021)
Nathan Aspinall	3rd	1	9	Runner-up (2020)
Dimitri Van den Bergh	2nd	1	11	5th place (2021)
Chris Dobey	1st	1	21	Debut

== League stage ==
The fixtures were announced on 30 January 2023.

=== 2 February – Night 1 ===
(Northern Ireland) SSE Arena, Belfast

Night 1 was played in Belfast. Chris Dobey was the winner in his Premier League debut, after beating Michael van Gerwen 6–5 in the night's final.

Quarter-finals (best of 11 legs)
Dimitri Van den Bergh 99.77	6
Jonny Clayton 101.04	2
Michael Smith 100.84	3
Michael van Gerwen 102.36	6
Peter Wright 103.77	3
Chris Dobey 95.98	6
Nathan Aspinall 94.39	6
Gerwyn Price 91.29	4

Semi-finals (best of 11 legs)
Dimitri Van den Bergh 91.61	4
Michael van Gerwen 106.00	6
Chris Dobey 95.82	6
Nathan Aspinall 93.06	4

Final (best of 11 legs)
Michael van Gerwen 97.41	5
Chris Dobey 96.94	6

Night 1 Statistics
Night's Total Average: 97.61
Highest Checkout: Chris Dobey 170
Most 180s: Chris Dobey 11
Night's 180s: 38

=== 9 February – Night 2 ===
(Wales) Cardiff International Arena, Cardiff

Night 2 was played in Cardiff. Gerwyn Price was the winner, after beating Nathan Aspinall 6–3 in the night's final.

Quarter-finals (best of 11 legs)
Michael Smith 100.01	6
Jonny Clayton 89.37	3
Nathan Aspinall 105.22	6
Peter Wright 97.22	3
Gerwyn Price 93.56	6
Chris Dobey 92.37	5
Michael van Gerwen 95.55	6
Dimitri Van den Bergh 94.83	4

Semi-finals (best of 11 legs)
Michael Smith 91.09	4
Nathan Aspinall 105.39	6
Gerwyn Price 96.88	6
Michael van Gerwen 110.75	5

Final (best of 11 legs)
Nathan Aspinall 93.09	3
Gerwyn Price 97.32	6

Night 2 Statistics
Night's Total Average: 97.22
Highest Checkout: Peter Wright 156
Most 180s: Nathan Aspinall 10
Total 180s: 31

=== 16 February – Night 3 ===
(Scotland) OVO Hydro, Glasgow

Night 3 was played in Glasgow. Michael Smith was the winner, after beating Dimitri Van den Bergh 6–4 in the night's final.

Quarter-finals (best of 11 legs)
Nathan Aspinall 94.67	6
Michael van Gerwen 94.74	5
Peter Wright 98.23	4
Dimitri Van den Bergh 94.76	6
Gerwyn Price 89.98	3
Michael Smith 91.19	6
Jonny Clayton 102.56	6
Chris Dobey 101.60	1

Semi-finals (best of 11 legs)
Nathan Aspinall 88.18	1
Dimitri Van den Bergh 105.73	6
Michael Smith 101.90	6
Jonny Clayton 99.14	5

Final (best of 11 legs)
Dimitri Van den Bergh 97.66	4
Michael Smith 109.42	6

Night 3 Statistics
Night's Total Average: 97.60
Highest Checkout: Michael van Gerwen 170
Most 180s: Dimitri Van den Bergh 11
Total 180s: 42

=== 23 February – Night 4 ===
(Republic of Ireland) 3Arena, Dublin

Night 4 was played in Dublin. Michael van Gerwen was the winner, after beating Gerwyn Price 6–5 in the night's final.

Quarter-finals (best of 11 legs)
Michael Smith 94.55	6
Peter Wright 91.22	5
Gerwyn Price 104.39	6
Dimitri Van den Bergh 98.12	4
Jonny Clayton 91.49	6
Nathan Aspinall 90.58	4
Chris Dobey 92.75	3
Michael van Gerwen 98.95	6

Semi-finals (best of 11 legs)
Michael Smith 100.28	1
Gerwyn Price 102.03	6
Jonny Clayton 92.36	3
Michael van Gerwen 95.40	6

Final (best of 11 legs)
Gerwyn Price 91.94	5
Michael van Gerwen 94.40	6

Night 4 Statistics
Night's Total Average: 95.10
Highest Checkout: Chris Dobey 148
Most 180s: Gerwyn Price 11
Total 180s: 41

=== 2 March – Night 5 ===
(England) Westpoint Exeter, Exeter

Night 5 was played in Exeter. Michael van Gerwen was the winner, after beating Jonny Clayton 6–3 in the night's final.

Quarter-finals (best of 11 legs)
Michael van Gerwen 96.38	6
Gerwyn Price 89.10	3
Nathan Aspinall 95.74	6
Michael Smith 94.26	3
Dimitri Van den Bergh 104.49	6
Chris Dobey 104.45	3
Jonny Clayton 89.91	6
Peter Wright 92.10	5

Semi-finals (best of 11 legs)
Michael van Gerwen 100.89	6
Nathan Aspinall 95.19	4
Dimitri Van den Bergh 93.38	2
Jonny Clayton 94.40	6

Final (best of 11 legs)
Michael van Gerwen 97.45	6
Jonny Clayton 96.22	3

Night 5 Statistics
Night's Total Average: 95.77
Highest Checkout: Nathan Aspinall and Dimitri Van den Bergh 140
Most 180s: Nathan Aspinall 8
Total 180s: 31

=== 9 March – Night 6 ===
(England) Liverpool Arena, Liverpool

Night 6 was played in Liverpool. Michael van Gerwen was the winner, after beating Michael Smith 6–4 in the night's final.

Quarter-finals (best of 11 legs)
Gerwyn Price 89.17	5
Peter Wright 92.79	6
Michael van Gerwen 96.55	6
Jonny Clayton 93.47	2
Chris Dobey 101.98	4
Nathan Aspinall 99.52	6
Michael Smith 92.51	6
Dimitri Van den Bergh 91.80	3

Semi-finals (best of 11 legs)
Peter Wright 91.85	1
Michael van Gerwen 94.31	6
Nathan Aspinall 75.47	2
Michael Smith 91.52	6

Final (best of 11 legs)
Michael van Gerwen 100.20	6
Michael Smith 99.09	4

Night 6 Statistics
Night's Total Average: 93.64
Highest Checkout: Nathan Aspinall 143
Most 180s: Michael Smith 11
Total 180s: 36

=== 16 March – Night 7 ===
(England) Nottingham Arena, Nottingham

Night 7 was played in Nottingham. Gerwyn Price was the winner, after beating Chris Dobey 6–4 in the night's final.

Quarter-finals (best of 11 legs)
Dimitri Van den Bergh 90.91	6
Nathan Aspinall 92.90	4
Jonny Clayton 94.01	4
Gerwyn Price 97.58	6
Peter Wright 89.06	1
Michael van Gerwen 94.89	6
Chris Dobey 93.42	6
Michael Smith 96.85	4

Semi-finals (best of 11 legs)
Dimitri Van den Bergh 100.95	4
Gerwyn Price 100.94	6
Michael van Gerwen 100.36	0
Chris Dobey 101.33	6

Final (best of 11 legs)
Gerwyn Price 101.04	6
Chris Dobey 95.48	4

Night 7 Statistics
Night's Total Average: 96.25
Highest Checkout: Gerwyn Price 156
Most 180s: Gerwyn Price 10
Total 180s: 32

=== 23 March – Night 8 ===
(England) Newcastle Arena, Newcastle

Night 8 was played in Newcastle. Gerwyn Price was the winner, after beating Michael van Gerwen 6–1 in the night's final.

Quarter-finals (best of 11 legs)
1	Michael van Gerwen 92.84	6
8	Peter Wright 89.13	5
4	Nathan Aspinall 101.27	6
5	Dimitri Van den Bergh 95.49	5
2	Gerwyn Price 94.55	6
7	Jonny Clayton 80.89	1
3	Michael Smith 97.38	4
6	Chris Dobey 94.79	6

Semi-finals (best of 11 legs)
1	Michael van Gerwen 100.20	6
4	Nathan Aspinall 93.00	0
2	Gerwyn Price 86.98	6
6	Chris Dobey 85.35	4

Final (best of 11 legs)
1	Michael van Gerwen 98.48	1
2	Gerwyn Price 114.96	6

Night 8 Statistics
Night's Total Average: 93.92
Highest Checkout: Michael van Gerwen 150
Most 180s: Gerwyn Price 10
Total 180s: 38

=== 30 March – Night 9 ===
(Germany) Mercedes-Benz Arena, Berlin

Night 9 was played in Berlin. Jonny Clayton was the winner, after beating Michael Smith 6–4 in the night's final.

Quarter-finals (best of 11 legs)
Dimitri Van den Bergh 87.09	3
Michael Smith 94.29	6
Nathan Aspinall 103.38	6
Chris Dobey 99.09	4
Jonny Clayton 97.16	6
Michael van Gerwen 89.18	5
Peter Wright 92.78	3
Gerwyn Price 101.47	6

Semi-finals (best of 11 legs)
Michael Smith 104.19	6
Nathan Aspinall 98.91	4
Jonny Clayton 101.43	6
Gerwyn Price 99.05	4

Final (best of 11 legs)
Michael Smith 97.74	4
Jonny Clayton 91.79	6

Night 9 Statistics
Night's Total Average: 96.79
Highest Checkout: Michael Smith 130
Most 180s: Michael Smith 15
Total 180s: 41

=== 6 April – Night 10 ===
(England) Arena Birmingham, Birmingham

Night 10 was played in Birmingham. Jonny Clayton was the winner, after beating Peter Wright 6–5 in the night's final.

Quarter-finals (best of 11 legs)
Michael van Gerwen 106.08	6
Chris Dobey 106.47	2
Nathan Aspinall 100.18	4
Jonny Clayton 96.88	6
Dimitri Van den Bergh 97.60	5
Gerwyn Price 102.23	6
Peter Wright 95.47	6
Michael Smith 99.00	1

Semi-finals (best of 11 legs)
Michael van Gerwen 98.15	3
Jonny Clayton 92.89	6
Gerwyn Price 101.30	5
Peter Wright 97.52	6

Final (best of 11 legs)
Jonny Clayton 95.59	6
Peter Wright 91.13	5

Night 10 Statistics
Night's Total Average: 98.26
Highest Checkout: Jonny Clayton 142
Most 180s: Michael van Gerwen 9
Total 180s: 37

=== 13 April – Night 11 ===
(England) Brighton Centre, Brighton

Night 11 was played in Brighton. Gerwyn Price was the winner, after beating Michael Smith 6–3 in the night's final.

Quarter-finals (best of 11 legs)
Dimitri Van den Bergh 95.17	2
Michael van Gerwen 104.11	6
Chris Dobey 103.27	2
Gerwyn Price 115.97	6
Peter Wright 100.71	6
Nathan Aspinall 98.01	5
Jonny Clayton 92.31	4
Michael Smith 91.93	6

Semi-finals (best of 11 legs)
Michael van Gerwen 104.71	5
Gerwyn Price 108.08	6
Peter Wright 99.33	5
Michael Smith 96.72	6

Final (best of 11 legs)
Gerwyn Price 100.08	6
Michael Smith 95.45	3

Night 11 Statistics
Night's Total Average: 99.95
Highest Checkout: Michael Smith 160
Most 180s: Gerwyn Price 15
Total 180s: 56

=== 20 April – Night 12 ===
(Netherlands) Rotterdam Ahoy, Rotterdam

Quarter-finals (best of 11 legs)
Chris Dobey 97.64	4
Jonny Clayton 100.46	6
Michael Smith 98.42	3
Gerwyn Price 102.16	6
Dimitri Van den Bergh 87.08	6
Peter Wright 87.76	3
Michael van Gerwen 91.21	5
Nathan Aspinall 90.81	6

Semi-finals (best of 11 legs)
Jonny Clayton 88.58	1
Gerwyn Price 100.63	6
Dimitri Van den Bergh 91.76	4
Nathan Aspinall 99.22	6

Final (best of 11 legs)
Gerwyn Price 88.52	4
Nathan Aspinall 97.30	6

Night 12 Statistics
Night's Total Average: 94.25
Highest Checkout: Gerwyn Price 140
Most 180s: Gerwyn Price 12
Total 180s: 29

=== 27 April – Night 13 ===
(England) Leeds Arena, Leeds

Quarter-finals (best of 11 legs)
Michael Smith 105.58	6
Chris Dobey 100.83	1
Michael van Gerwen 94.64	3
Peter Wright 97.45	6
Gerwyn Price 110.35	6
Jonny Clayton 100.47	2
Nathan Aspinall 98.23	6
Dimitri Van den Bergh 94.37	4

Semi-finals (best of 11 legs)
Michael Smith 94.79	6
Peter Wright 80.41	2
Gerwyn Price 89.98	6
Nathan Aspinall 93.63	3

Final (best of 11 legs)
Michael Smith 104.86	6
Gerwyn Price 100.31	4

Night 13 Statistics
Night's Total Average: 94.24
Highest Checkout: Michael Smith 164
Most 180s: Michael Smith 14
Total 180s: 40

=== 4 May – Night 14 ===
(England) Manchester Arena, Manchester

Quarter-finals (best of 11 legs)
Peter Wright 89.21	5
Jonny Clayton 91.65	6
Chris Dobey 102.16	6
Dimitri Van den Bergh 95.02	2
Michael Smith 93.37	6
Nathan Aspinall 88.46	3
Gerwyn Price 104.42	2
Michael van Gerwen 103.10	6

Semi-finals (best of 11 legs)
Jonny Clayton 93.93	6
Chris Dobey 96.60	3
Michael Smith 91.62	6
Michael van Gerwen 99.40	4

Final (best of 11 legs)
Jonny Clayton 96.08	3
Michael Smith 110.05	6

Night 14 Statistics
Night's Total Average: 96.14
Highest Checkout: Chris Dobey 170
Most 180s: Michael Smith 8
Total 180s: 32

=== 11 May – Night 15 ===
(England) Sheffield Arena, Sheffield

Quarter-finals (best of 11 legs)
Gerwyn Price 111.33	6
Nathan Aspinall 104.41	2
Chris Dobey 102.02	6
Peter Wright 97.17	4
Michael van Gerwen 95.80	4
Michael Smith 94.13	6
Jonny Clayton 100.02	6
Dimitri Van den Bergh 95.94	4

Semi-finals (best of 11 legs)
Gerwyn Price 104.95	6
Chris Dobey 98.97	2
Michael Smith 107.82	6
Jonny Clayton 94.71	4

Final (best of 11 legs)
Gerwyn Price 91.94	3
Michael Smith 99.23	6

Night 15 Statistics
Night's Total Average: 99.49
Highest Checkout: Jonny Clayton 170
Most 180s: Gerwyn Price 9
Total 180s: 37

=== 18 May – Night 16 ===
(Scotland) P&J Live, Aberdeen

Quarter-finals (best of 11 legs)
1	Gerwyn Price 103.15	6
8	Peter Wright 87.53	2
4	Jonny Clayton 93.13	1
5	Nathan Aspinall 103.09	6
2	Michael Smith 95.07	4
7	Dimitri Van den Bergh 100.05	6
3	Michael van Gerwen 98.63	6
6	Chris Dobey 92.00	3

Semi-finals (best of 11 legs)
1	Gerwyn Price 96.28	6
5	Nathan Aspinall 88.88	3
7	Dimitri Van den Bergh	w/o
3	Michael van Gerwen (Note: withdrew due to injury)	w/d

Final (best of 11 legs)
1	Gerwyn Price 93.13	5
7	Dimitri Van den Bergh 99.25	6

Night 16 Statistics
Night's Total Average: 95.79
Highest Checkout: Jonny Clayton 160
Most 180s: Gerwyn Price 10
Night's 180s: 37

== 25 May – Play-offs ==
The top four players of the league stage contest in the play-offs to decide the champion of the Premier League.

(England) The O_{2}, London

	Score	
Semi-finals (best of 19 legs)
Gerwyn Price 107.54	10–2	Jonny Clayton 90.19
Michael Smith 97.90	8–10	Michael van Gerwen 101.45
Final (best of 21 legs)
Gerwyn Price 99.50	5–11	Michael van Gerwen 105.43
Night's Total Average: 100.33
Highest Checkout: Michael van Gerwen 170
Most 180s: Michael van Gerwen 12
Night's 180s: 25

== Standings ==
Five points are awarded for a night win, three points for the runner-up and two points for the semi-finalists. When players are tied on points, nights won is used first as a tie-breaker and after that overall matches won.

The top 4 players after 16 nights advance to the play-offs on 25 May.

Pos	Name	Nights					Matches			Legs				Scoring						
Pos	Name	Pts	W	RU	SF	QF	Pld	W	L	LF	LA	LD	LWAT	100+	140+	180	A	HC	CR	C%
1	Gerwyn Price (RU)	39	4	5	2	5	36	24	12	191	144	+47	76	343	221	112	98.31	158	191/486	39.30%
2	Michael Smith	33	4	3	2	7	32	20	12	158	141	+17	55	340	214	102	97.70	164	158/401	39.40%
3	Michael van Gerwen (C)	33	3	2	6	5	32	19	13	159	132	+27	61	295	191	87	98.19	170	159/420	37.85%
4	Jonny Clayton	24	2	2	4	8	28	14	14	122	137	–15	42	319	159	50	94.70	170	122/277	44.04%
5	Nathan Aspinall	24	1	1	8	6	28	13	15	124	140	–16	48	297	198	82	95.72	143	124/342	36.25%
6	Dimitri Van den Bergh	16	1	1	4	10	24	9	15	102	115	–13	44	232	149	59	95.59	151	102/260	39.23%
7	Chris Dobey	14	1	1	3	11	23	8	15	93	116	–23	35	220	130	62	97.32	170	93/250	37.20%
8	Peter Wright	9	0	1	3	12	21	5	16	86	115	–29	29	225	125	44	93.45	156	86/224	38.39%

As of 25 May 2023 (Week 16)

(C) Champion after the playoffs, (RU) Runner-up after the playoffs

== Streaks ==
Player	Nights																
Player	1	2	3	4	5	6	7	8	9	10	11	12	13	14	15	16	Play-offs
Gerwyn Price	QF	W	QF	RU	QF		W		SF		W	RU		QF	RU		RU
Michael Smith	QF	SF	W	SF	QF	RU	QF		RU	QF	RU	QF	W			QF	SF
Michael van Gerwen	RU	SF	QF	W			SF	RU	QF	SF		QF		SF	QF	SF	W
Jonny Clayton	QF		SF		RU	QF			W		QF	SF	QF	RU	SF	QF	SF
Nathan Aspinall	SF	RU	SF	QF	SF		QF	SF		QF		W	SF	QF		SF	DNQ
Dimitri Van den Bergh	SF	QF	RU	QF	SF	QF	SF	QF				SF	QF			W	DNQ
Chris Dobey	W	QF					RU	SF	QF					SF		QF	DNQ
Peter Wright	QF					SF	QF			RU	SF	QF	SF	QF			DNQ

Legend:	DNQ	Did not qualify	QF	Lost in Quarterfinals	SF	Semi-finalist	RU	Runner-up	W	Night winner

== Positions by Week ==
Player	Nights															
Player	1	2	3	4	5	6	7	8	9	10	11	12	13	14	15	16
Gerwyn Price	5	3	6	3	4		2					1				
Michael Smith	7	6	1	2			3	4	3	4	3	5	3		2	
Michael van Gerwen	2		4	1								2			3	
Jonny Clayton	8		7		6		7		5	3	4		5	4		
Nathan Aspinall	4		2	4	3		4	3	4	5		3	4	5		
Dimitri Van den Bergh	3	5	3	5				6	7			6		7		6
Chris Dobey	1		5	6	7		6	5	6			7		6		7
Peter Wright	6	7	8													
