= Jonny Clayton =

Welsh darts player (born 1974)

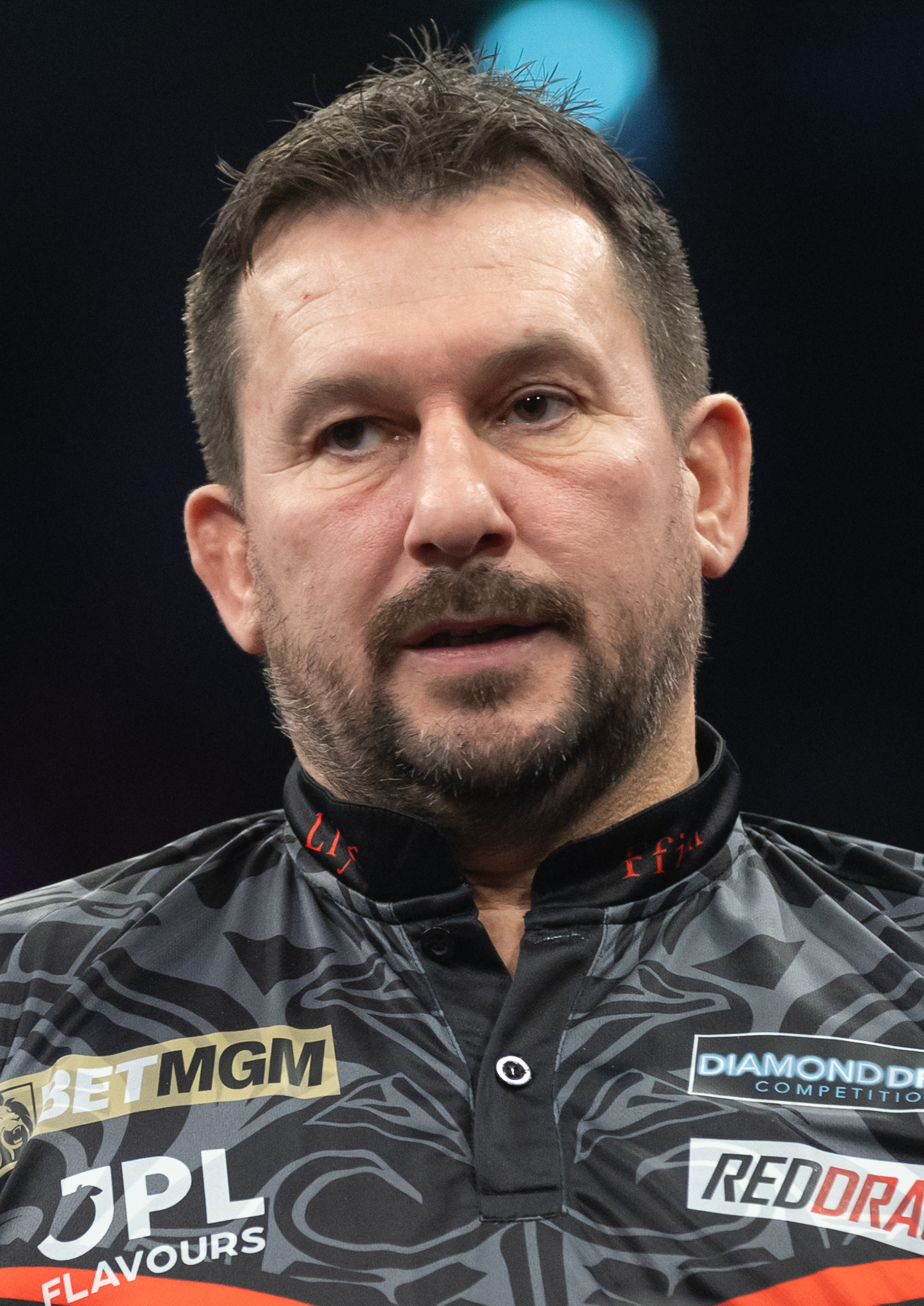
- Clayton in 2026

Personal information
- Nickname: "The Ferret"
- Born: 4 October 1974 (age 52) Llanelli, Carmarthenshire, Wales
- Home town: Pontyberem, Carmarthenshire, Wales

Sport
- Sport: Darts
- Playing since: 1995
- Darts: 22g Red Dragon Signature
- Laterality: Right-handed
- Walk-on music: "Johnny B. Goode" by Chuck Berry

Organisation (see split in darts)
- BDO: 2008–2015
- PDC: 2015–present (Tour Card: 2015–present)
- Current world ranking: (PDC) 5 (5 November 2026)

WDF major events – best performances
- World Masters: Last 272: 2012

PDC premier events – best performances
- World Championship: Quarter-final: 2023, 2026
- World Matchplay: Runner-up: 2023
- World Grand Prix: Winner (1): 2021
- UK Open: Semi-final: 2020, 2025
- Grand Slam: Quarter-final: 2018, 2021
- European Championship: Semi-final: 2020
- Premier League: Winner (1): 2021
- PC Finals: Runner-up: 2017
- Masters: Winner (1): 2021
- World Series Finals: Winner (1): 2021

Other tournament wins
- Years
PDC World Cup of Darts (team event)	2020, 2023
WDF Europe Cup Team	2014
Players Championships (×7)
2017, 2019, 2021 (×2), 2023, 2024, 2025
European Tour Events (×4)
Austrian Darts Open (×2)	2018, 2023
Dutch Darts Championship	2025
Swiss Darts Trophy	2026
World Series of Darts (×2)
New South Wales Darts Masters	2022
New Zealand Darts Masters	2026

Jonny Clayton (born 4 October 1974) is a Welsh professional darts player who competes in Professional Darts Corporation (PDC) events, where he is ranked world number five. Nicknamed "the Ferret", he won four PDC major singles titles in 2021: the Masters, Premier League, World Series Finals, and World Grand Prix. He has also won the PDC World Cup of Darts on two occasions in 2020 and 2023, representing Wales alongside Gerwyn Price. He has won a total of 19 PDC titles in his professional career, including four European Tour titles.

He has reached the quarter-finals in the 2023 and 2026 editions of the PDC World Darts Championship.

== Career ==
=== 2015 ===
Clayton joined the PDC Pro Tour in 2015 after winning a Tour Card on the final day of Qualifying School. His first quarter-final came at the sixth Players Championship event and he lost 6–1 to Benito van de Pas. Clayton qualified for the Grand Slam of Darts later in that year, but despite winning his opening match against Terry Jenkins, he went on to finish bottom of his group.

=== 2016 ===
Clayton's first appearance at the UK Open came in the 2016 edition, but he was defeated 6–3 by James Wilson in the second round. Clayton recorded a quarter-final showing at the eighth Players Championship and reached his first semi-final at the 12th event, but was whitewashed 6–0 by Gary Anderson. A 2–0 victory over Tony Darlow saw Clayton claim the non-ranking Worthingtons Darts Champion of Champions title. He lost 6–3 to Darren Webster in round one of the Players Championship Finals.

=== 2017 ===
Clayton made his PDC World Championship debut in the 2017 event, and came from a set down to beat fellow Welshman Gerwyn Price 3–1 in the first round. He lost 4–1 to Ian White in the second round.

Clayton won his first PDC ranking title with Players Championship 22 after beating James Wilson 6–1 in the final.

Clayton got to his first PDC major final at the 2017 Players Championship Finals. He beat Jeffrey de Graaf, Price, Stephen Bunting, Steve Beaton and number 1 seed Rob Cross, before losing out to Michael van Gerwen.

=== 2018 ===
His run to the final saw him break into the top 32 of the PDC Order of Merit, meaning that he was a seed at the 2018 PDC World Darts Championship, where he was eliminated by fellow countryman Jamie Lewis.

He went on to win the 2018 Austrian Darts Open by defeating Gerwyn Price 8–5 in the final. This meant that he was the first Welsh winner on the PDC European Tour.

=== 2019 ===
Clayton won Players Championship 10 by defeating Gabriel Clemens 8–4 in the final. This was Jonny's 3rd ranking title.

=== 2020: World Cup Champion ===
At this point a three-time PDC ranking title winner, Clayton was selected as a 'challenger' for the 2020 Premier League night in Cardiff, but lost 7–1 to an inspired Michael Smith.

Clayton kicked off his 2020 season by defeating world number one Michael van Gerwen 10–6 in the opening round of the 2020 Masters.

He went on to win the 2020 PDC World Cup of Darts for Wales with Gerwyn Price as his teammate, defeating the English side of Rob Cross and Michael Smith 3–0.

=== 2021: First individual major title, Premier League and Grand Prix champion ===
At the Masters Clayton beat José de Sousa, Michael van Gerwen, James Wade and Peter Wright en route to the final where he faced Mervyn King. Clayton won the match 11–8 to win his first major individual televised title. In his match against Wade, he was successful in checking out 10 times out of 11 for a success rate of 91%, which the PDC claimed to be a possible world record.

He won two Players Championship events, PC4 and PC7 early in 2021.

Upon winning the Masters tournament, Clayton was invited to participate in the 2021 Premier League Darts, where on the third night of his debut season he hit a nine-dart finish on the way to beating José de Sousa.

After the fifth evening of league action, Clayton was placed at the top of the league. He slipped to as low as 8th, before going into 4th position for night 16. He had to achieve at least a draw to secure his place in the playoffs. He managed to do so and won his game against Dimitri Van den Bergh winning 8–6.

In the playoffs he beat Michael van Gerwen 10–8 in their semi-final. He went on to defeat José de Sousa 11–5 in the final. In doing so he became the first Welsh winner of the Premier League and the first player to finish 4th in the league phase and win the title.

Clayton participated in the World Grand Prix in which he reached the final after beating Callan Rydz, José de Sousa, Krzysztof Ratajski and Danny Noppert along the way. In the final Clayton prevailed over World No. 1 Gerwyn Price with a 5–1 victory winning him his third major tournament of the year. Three weeks later, Clayton picked up his fourth TV title of the year with an 11–6 victory over Dimitri Van den Bergh in the final of the World Series of Darts Finals.

=== 2022 ===
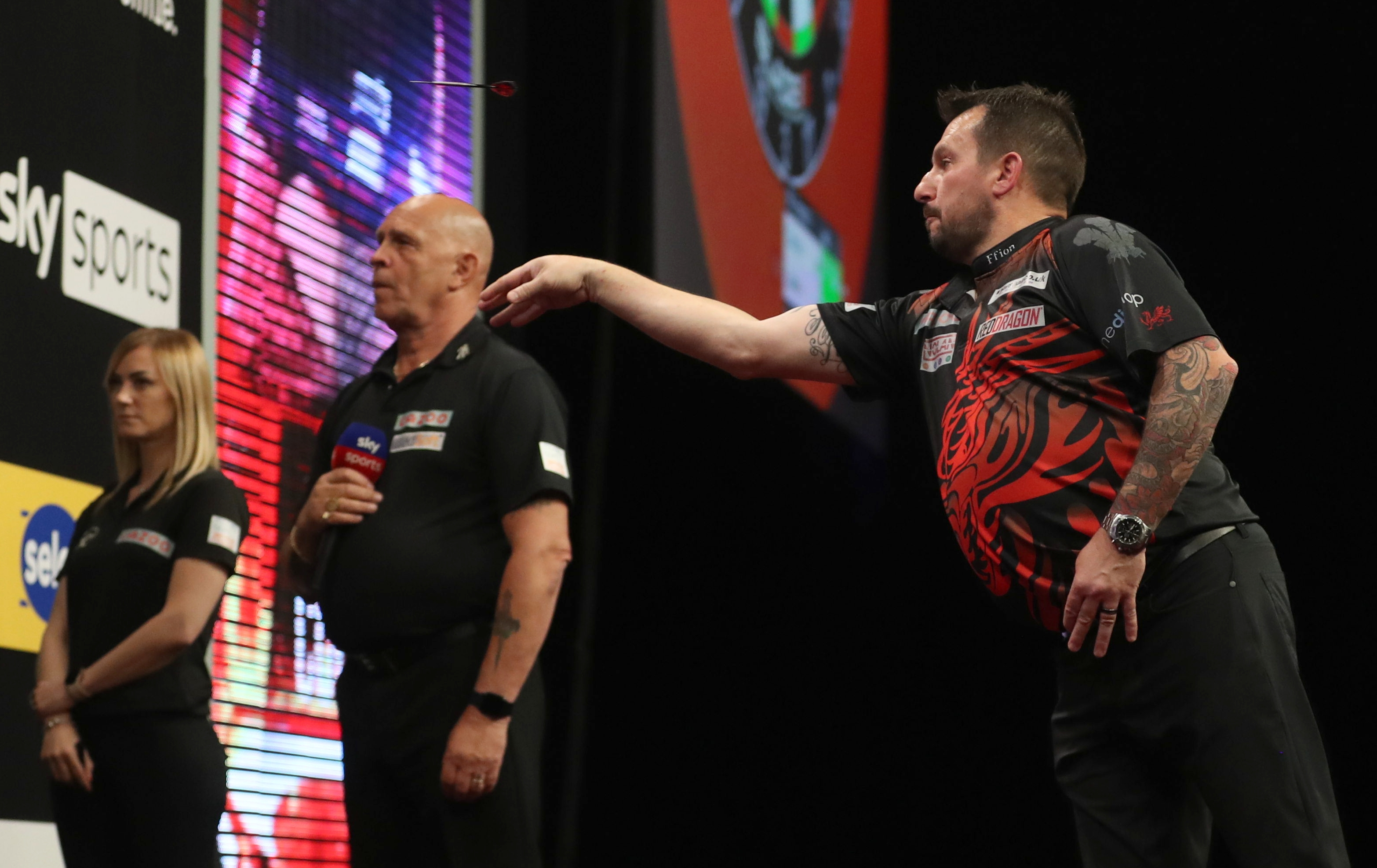
Clayton during the 2022 Premier League play-offs

At the 2022 World Championship, Clayton reached the fourth round where he lost to eventual finalist Michael Smith 4–3. He reached the semi-finals of the Masters but was unable to defend his title, losing 11–6 to runner-up Dave Chisnall.

Clayton entered the 2022 Premier League as defending champion and secured qualification for the play-offs following his night 13 win in Glasgow. He finished first in the league phase with four nightly wins. He faced fourth-placed Joe Cullen in the play-off semi-finals and lost 10–4.

The Welsh team of Clayton and Gerwyn Price reached the final of the World Cup of Darts but were defeated 3–1 by Damon Heta and Simon Whitlock of Australia. Clayton won his first World Series of Darts title at the New South Wales Darts Masters in Wollongong, beating James Wade 8–1 in the final.

=== 2023 ===
At the 2023 World Championship, Clayton whitewashed Danny van Trijp 3–0 in his second-round tie, then defeated Brendan Dolan 4–1 in the third round before beating Josh Rock 4–3 to reach the quarter-finals for the first time in his career. He lost his quarter-final match to Dimitri Van den Bergh 5–3.

Clayton was selected for the Premier League following his world championship campaign. He achieved back-to-back nightly wins on night nine and night ten, defeating reigning world champion Michael Smith in the final of night nine before adding another final win over Peter Wright the next week. He qualified for the play-offs by finishing in fourth place in the league phase. This meant he faced league leader Gerwyn Price in the play-off semi-finals, who defeated Clayton 10–2.

In June, Clayton teamed with Price at the World Cup of Darts, with the Welsh pair winning their second World Cup title after a 10–2 victory over Scotland (Peter Wright and Gary Anderson) in the final. The next month, Clayton reached the final of the World Matchplay but suffered a 18–6 defeat to Nathan Aspinall.

=== 2024 ===
At the 2024 World Championship, Clayton won his second-round match 3–1 against Steve Lennon, then defeated Krzysztof Ratajski before being whitewashed 4–0 by Rob Cross in the fourth round. He reached the final of the Dutch Darts Championship in May, but lost 8–4 to Josh Rock. In July, he won his only title of the year at Players Championship 14 by defeating Wesley Plaisier 8–5 in the final.

=== 2025 ===
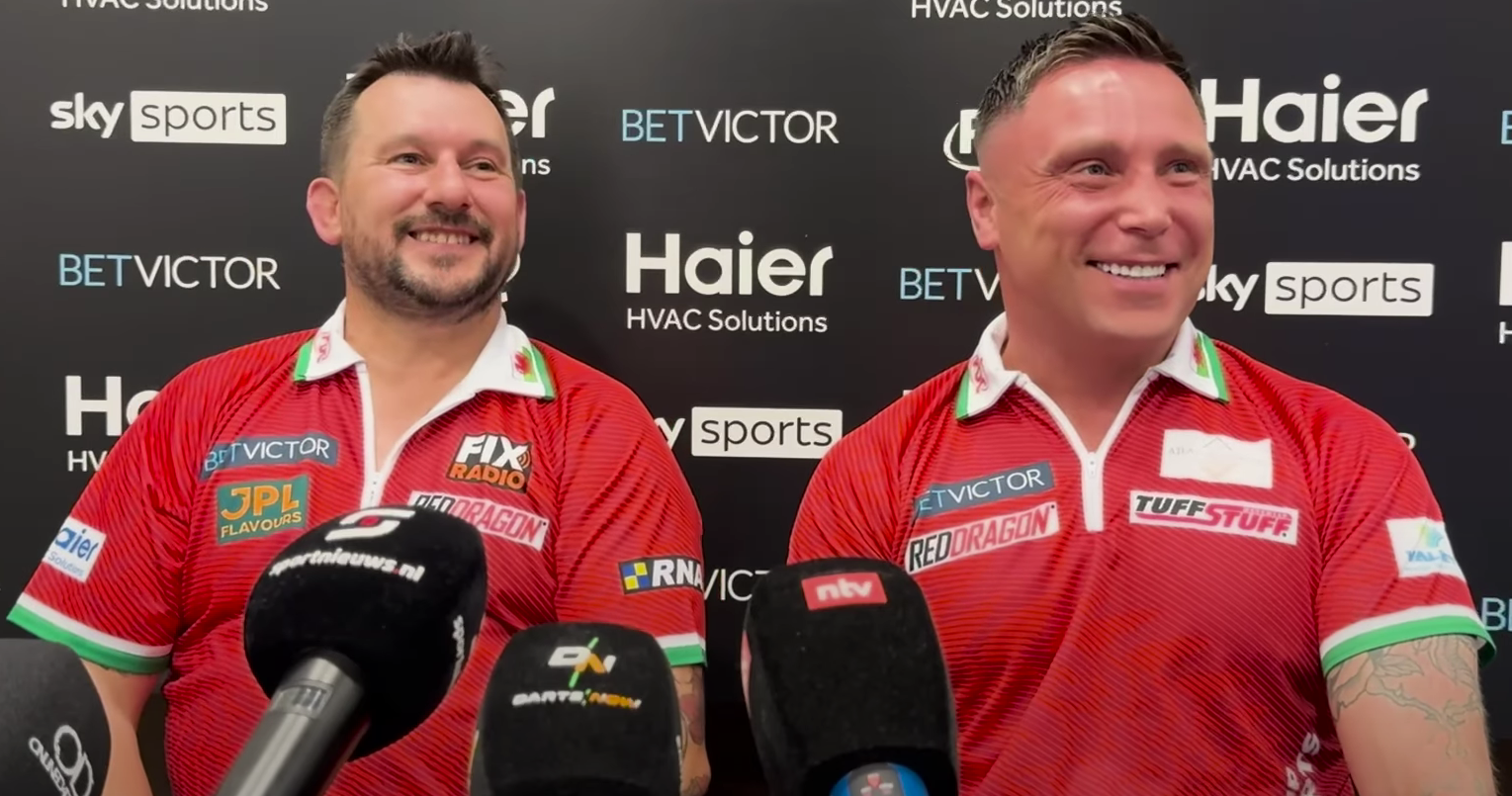
Clayton (left) and his Wales teammate Gerwyn Price at the 2025 PDC World Cup of Darts

Clayton reached the fourth round of the 2025 World Championship, where he was defeated by Gerwyn Price 4–2. Clayton produced his highest televised three-dart average in his first-round match against Martin Schindler at the World Masters, averaging 112.77 to beat Schindler 3–1 in sets. He reached the final of the tournament, where he faced Luke Humphries. Clayton recovered from 5–2 down to level the match at 5–5, but ultimately lost 6–5 in a deciding leg. He defeated Gary Anderson and Michael Smith en route to the semi-finals of the UK Open, where he lost 11–6 to Luke Littler. This run saw him rise to world number five on the PDC Order of Merit.

Clayton earned his sole Players Championship title of the year at Players Championship 14 by winning the final 8–2 against Dominik Grüllich. In May, he won his third European Tour title at the Dutch Darts Championship, earning wins over Danny Noppert in the quarter-finals and Luke Humphries in the semi-finals before defeating Niko Springer 8–6 in the final. He represented Wales at the World Cup of Darts alongside Gerwyn Price and the duo reached the final, but they were narrowly defeated in the final 10–9 by Northern Ireland. He subsequently reached the semi-finals of the World Matchplay and the World Grand Prix, being denied a second 2025 major final by James Wade and Luke Littler.

=== 2026 ===
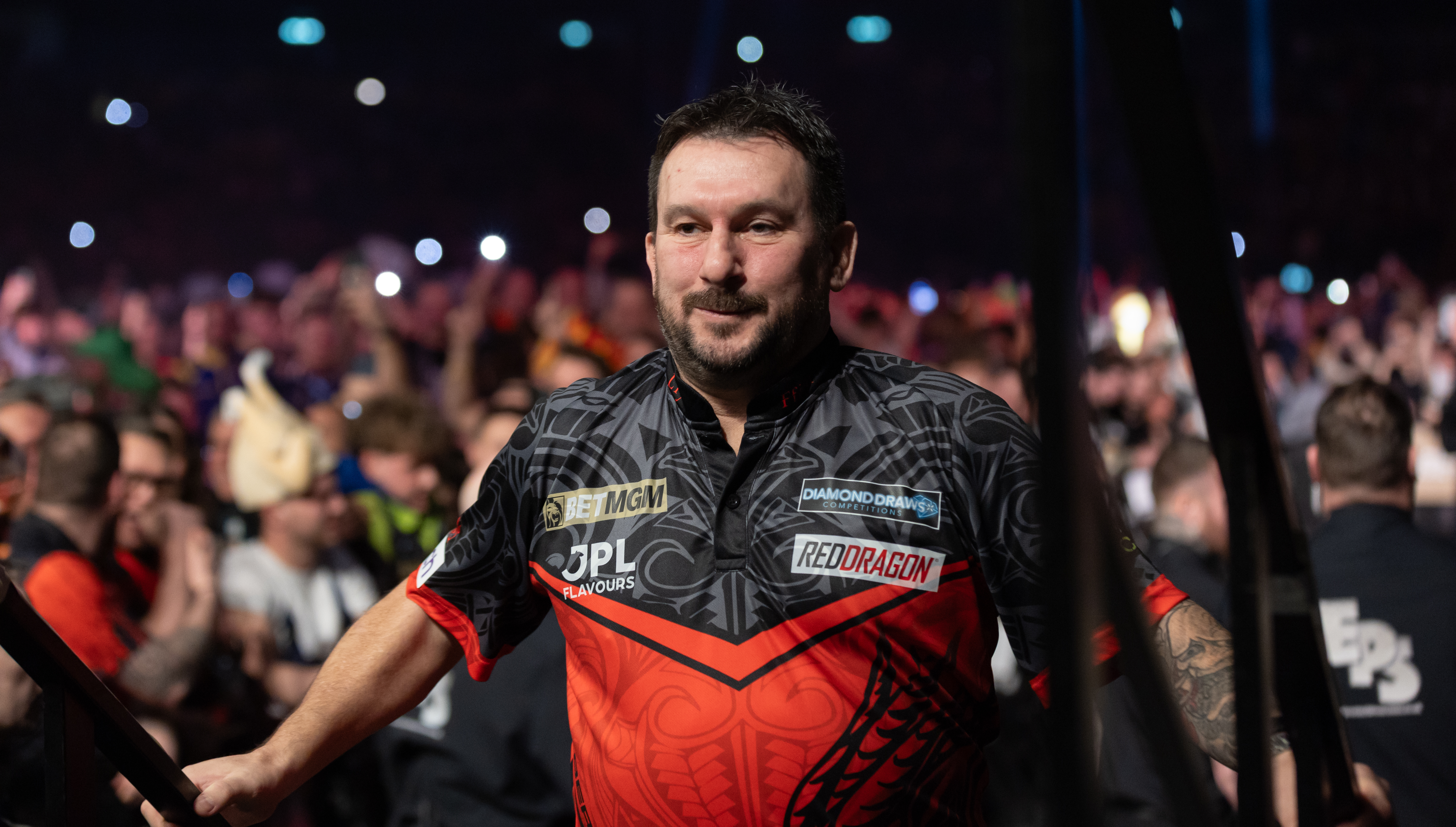
Clayton on night eight of the 2026 Premier League

At the 2026 World Championship, Clayton reached his second World Championship quarter-final by defeating Andreas Harrysson 4–2. He was beaten 5–2 by Ryan Searle. On 5 January 2026, Clayton was selected to compete in the Premier League for the first time since 2023. He reached the final of the Belgian Darts Open, which he lost 8–6 to Luke Humphries. He was also a finalist at Players Championship 16 in May, losing 8–3 to Andrew Gilding.

On his return to the Premier League, Clayton achieved four nightly wins during the league stage. He finished second in the league table with 34 points to qualify for the play-offs. On Finals Night on 28 May, he missed a match dart in the deciding leg of his semi-final against Luke Humphries, leading to a 10–9 defeat. Clayton finished as runner-up at Players Championship 19, losing 8–5 to Jeffrey de Graaf in his third ranking final of the year. At the New Zealand Darts Masters, he won his second World Series title by defeating Gerwyn Price 8–4 in the final.

== Personal life ==
Clayton has a wife, Ellen, and two children. Before becoming a professional darts player, Clayton worked as a plasterer for Carmarthenshire County Council. He continued to work his plastering job for several years into his darts career. In 2022, he quit plastering to focus on darts full-time.

Clayton was a scrum-half and captain of amateur rugby union club Pontyberem RFC. A lounge named "The Ferret Lounge" has been established at the club in Clayton’s honour. He is a supporter of English football club Liverpool. He has the number 97 under the back of his collar on his shirt, as a mark of respect for the people who died in the Hillsborough disaster.

Clayton's father, John, died in July 2023. He considered quitting darts as a result. During a post-match press conference in December 2024, Clayton said, "It was over, I won’t lie to you. I had no interest, I didn’t want to play the game, I didn’t want to travel. It meant nothing to me… When I lost my dad, it hurt. He was my inspiration to keep playing. I said, 'That is it – I don’t want to do it any more.'"

== World Championship results ==
=== PDC ===
- 2017: Second round (lost to Ian White 1–4)
- 2018: First round (lost to Jamie Lewis 0–3)
- 2019: Second round (lost to Dimitri Van den Bergh 1–3)
- 2020: Third round (lost to Stephen Bunting 0–4)
- 2021: Third round (lost to Joe Cullen 3–4)
- 2022: Fourth round (lost to Michael Smith 3–4)
- 2023: Quarter-finals (lost to Dimitri Van den Bergh 3–5)
- 2024: Fourth round (lost to Rob Cross 0–4)
- 2025: Fourth round (lost to Gerwyn Price 2–4)
- 2026: Quarter-finals (lost to Ryan Searle 2–5)

== Career finals ==
=== PDC major finals: 7 (4 titles) ===
Legend
World Matchplay (0–1)
Premier League (1–0)
World Grand Prix (1–0)
World Masters (1–1)
Players Championship Finals (0–1)
World Series Finals (1–0)

Outcome	No.	Year	Championship	Opponent in the final	Score (Note: (l) = score in legs, (s) = score in sets.)	Ref.
Runner-up	1.	2017	Players Championship Finals	Michael van Gerwen	2–11 (l)	
Winner	1.	2021	Masters	Mervyn King	11–8 (l)	
Winner	2.	2021	Premier League	José de Sousa	11–5 (l)	
Winner	3.	2021	World Grand Prix	Gerwyn Price	5–1 (s)	
Winner	4.	2021	World Series Finals	Dimitri Van den Bergh	11–6 (l)	
Runner-up	2.	2023	World Matchplay	Nathan Aspinall	6–18 (l)	
Runner-up	3.	2025	World Masters	Luke Humphries	5–6 (s)	

=== PDC World Series finals: 3 (2 titles) ===
Outcome	No.	Year	Championship	Opponent in the final	Score
Winner	1.	2022	New South Wales Masters	James Wade	8–1 (l)
Runner-up	1.	2022	New Zealand Masters	Gerwyn Price	4–8 (l)
Winner	2.	2026	New Zealand Masters	Gerwyn Price	8–4 (l)

=== PDC team finals: 4 (2 titles) ===
Outcome	No.	Year	Championship	Country	Teammate	Opponents in the final	Score
Winner	1.	2020	World Cup	Wales	Gerwyn Price	England – Michael Smith and Rob Cross	3–0 (m)
Runner-up	1.	2022	World Cup	Wales	Gerwyn Price	Australia – Damon Heta and Simon Whitlock	1–3 (m)
Winner	2.	2023	World Cup (2)	Wales	Gerwyn Price	Scotland – Peter Wright and Gary Anderson	10–2 (l)
Runner-up	2.	2025	World Cup (2)	Wales	Gerwyn Price	Northern Ireland – Daryl Gurney and Josh Rock	9–10 (l)

== Career statistics ==
Performance Table Legend
W	Won the tournament	F	Finalist	SF	Semifinalist	QF	Quarterfinalist	#R; RR; Prel.	Lost in # round Round-robin; Preliminary round	DQ	Disqualified
DNQ	Did not qualify	DNP	Did not participate	WD	Withdrew	NH	Tournament not held	#R; RR; Prel.	Lost in # round Round-robin; Preliminary round	NYF	Not yet founded

=== Performance timeline ===
Tournament	2015	2016	2017	2018	2019	2020	2021	2022	2023	2024	2025	2026
PDC Ranked televised events
World Championship	DNQ		2R	1R	2R	3R	3R	4R	QF	4R	4R	QF
World Masters (Note: A non-ranked event until 2025)	Did not qualify				1R	QF	W	SF	QF	1R	F	2R
UK Open	1R	2R	3R	4R	5R	SF	6R	6R	6R	6R	SF	QF
World Matchplay	Did not qualify			1R	1R	1R	2R	1R	F	2R	SF	2R
World Grand Prix	Did not qualify			1R	1R	2R	W	2R	1R	QF	SF	QF
European Championship	DNQ		2R	1R	2R	SF	DNQ	2R	1R	2R	1R	QF
Grand Slam	RR	DNQ		QF	DNQ	2R	QF	2R	RR	DNQ	RR	RR
Players Championship Finals	DNQ	1R	F	QF	1R	2R	SF	SF	2R	1R	1R	
PDC Non-ranked televised events
Premier League	Did not participate					C	W	SF	SF	DNP		SF
World Cup	DNP			QF	1R	W	SF	F	W	2R	F	QF
World Series Finals	DNQ		1R	DNQ	QF	DNQ	W	SF	2R	1R	2R	SF
Career statistics
Year-end ranking	74	60	31	15	16	17	8	7	9	7	5	

==== European Tour ====
Season	1	2	3	4	5	6	7	8	9	10	11	12	13	14	15
2015	GDC; DNP	GDT; DNP	GDM; DNQ	DDM; 1R	IDO; 2R	Did not qualify			EDG; 2R						
2016	Did not qualify			EDM; 2R	ADO; 2R	EDO; 2R	IDO; DNQ	EDT; DNQ	EDG; 3R	GDC; DNQ					
2017	GDC; DNQ	GDM; 2R	GDO; DNQ	EDG; 2R	GDT; 2R	EDM; DNQ	ADO; 2R	Did not qualify				EDT; 3R			
2018	EDO; 1R	GDG; 2R	GDO; DNQ	ADO; W	EDG; DNQ	DDM; 1R	GDT; QF	DDO; 2R	EDM; 2R	GDC; 2R	DDC; 2R	IDO; 3R	EDT; 3R		
2019	EDO; 3R	GDC; 3R	GDG; 2R	GDO; 2R	ADO; 2R	EDG; 3R	DDM; 2R	DDO; SF	CDO; 2R	ADC; 2R	EDM; QF	IDO; 3R	GDT; 2R		
2020	BDC; 2R	GDC; F	EDG; DNQ	IDO; DNQ											
2021	HDT; 2R	GDT; 2R													
2022	IDO; SF	GDC; QF	GDG; QF	ADO; 3R	EDO; 3R	CDO; 2R	EDG; 3R	DDC; DNP	EDM; 2R	HDT; 2R	GDO; 3R	BDO; SF	GDT; 3R		
2023	BSD; SF	EDO; 2R	IDO; QF	GDG; 2R	ADO; W	DDC; 2R	BDO; QF	CDO; QF	EDG; 2R	EDM; 2R	GDO; DNP	HDT; 3R	GDC; 2R		
2024	BDO; QF	GDG; 2R	IDO; 2R	EDG; 3R	ADO; 3R	BSD; 2R	DDC; F	EDO; WD	GDC; 2R	FDT; 1R	HDT; 2R	SDT; 1R	CDO; QF		
2025	BDO; QF	EDT; 2R	IDO; 2R	GDG; 2R	ADO; 2R	EDG; 2R	DDC; W	EDO; SF	BSD; QF	FDT; 2R	CDO; 3R	HDT; WD	SDT; QF	GDC; 3R	
2026	PDO; 3R	EDT; WD	BDO; F	GDG; QF	EDG; 3R	ADO; WD	IDO; DNP	BSD; WD	SDO; 2R	EDO; 3R	HDT; 3R	CDO; QF	FDT; WD	SDT; W	DDC; 2R

==== Players Championships ====
Season	1	2	3	4	5	6	7	8	9	10	11	12	13	14	15	16	17	18	19	20	21	22	23	24	25	26	27	28	29	30	31	32	33	34
2015	BAR; 1R	BAR; 2R	BAR; 1R	BAR; 2R	BAR; 2R	COV; QF	COV; 1R	COV; 2R	CRA; 1R	CRA; 3R	BAR; DNP		WIG; 1R	WIG; 1R	BAR; 3R	BAR; 1R	DUB; 4R	DUB; 1R	COV; 2R	COV; 1R														
2016	BAR; 1R	BAR; 1R	BAR; 4R	BAR; 4R	BAR; 1R	BAR; 4R	BAR; 1R	COV; QF	COV; 1R	BAR; 1R	BAR; 1R	BAR; SF	BAR; 2R	BAR; 3R	BAR; 1R	BAR; 2R	DUB; 4R	DUB; 1R	BAR; 2R	BAR; 2R														
2017	BAR; 1R	BAR; 1R	BAR; 2R	BAR; 2R	MIL; 1R	MIL; 2R	BAR; 3R	BAR; 1R	WIG; 4R	WIG; QF	MIL; QF	MIL; QF	WIG; 3R	WIG; 1R	BAR; QF	BAR; 2R	BAR; 3R	BAR; 4R	DUB; 1R	DUB; 1R	BAR; 3R	BAR; W												
2018	BAR; 3R	BAR; 2R	BAR; 1R	BAR; 2R	MIL; 2R	MIL; 1R	BAR; 2R	BAR; 1R	WIG; QF	WIG; F	MIL; 1R	MIL; QF	WIG; QF	WIG; 4R	BAR; 3R	BAR; 2R	BAR; 4R	BAR; 1R	DUB; 2R	DUB; 1R	BAR; 1R	BAR; 1R												
2019	WIG; QF	WIG; SF	WIG; 1R	WIG; 4R	BAR; 4R	BAR; 4R	WIG; 3R	WIG; SF	BAR; 1R	BAR; W	BAR; QF	BAR; QF	BAR; 1R	BAR; 1R	BAR; 2R	BAR; 4R	WIG; 1R	WIG; 1R	BAR; 1R	BAR; 3R	HIL; 4R	HIL; 2R	BAR; 2R	BAR; 3R	BAR; 1R	BAR; SF	DUB; 2R	DUB; 4R	BAR; 4R	BAR; QF				
2020	BAR; 1R	BAR; 3R	WIG; 3R	WIG; 2R	WIG; 1R	WIG; 1R	BAR; 1R	BAR; 2R	MIL; 3R	MIL; QF	MIL; 4R	MIL; 1R	MIL; 1R	NIE; 1R	NIE; 2R	NIE; 2R	NIE; 4R	NIE; 2R	COV; 3R	COV; 2R	COV; 4R	COV; QF	COV; 2R											
2021	BOL; F	BOL; F	BOL; QF	BOL; W	MIL; 2R	MIL; 3R	MIL; W	MIL; 1R	NIE; Did not participate				MIL; SF	MIL; 3R	MIL; QF	MIL; 4R	COV; 4R	COV; 4R	COV; 4R	COV; 2R	BAR; 2R	BAR; 4R	BAR; F	BAR; Did not participate				BAR; 2R	BAR; 4R	BAR; QF				
2022	BAR; QF	BAR; 1R	WIG; 1R	WIG; 4R	BAR; 3R	BAR; 4R	NIE; DNP		BAR; 4R	BAR; 3R	BAR; 3R	BAR; QF	BAR; 4R	DNP			NIE; 3R	BAR; 1R	BAR; 1R	BAR; QF	BAR; F	BAR; DNP			BAR; 2R	BAR; 2R	BAR; 3R	BAR; 4R	BAR; 1R	BAR; 1R				
2023	BAR; SF	BAR; 3R	BAR; 4R	BAR; 4R	BAR; 3R	BAR; 3R	HIL; 2R	HIL; 2R	WIG; SF	WIG; 4R	LEI; 1R	LEI; W	HIL; DNP		LEI; QF	LEI; QF	HIL; DNP		BAR; 1R	BAR; 1R	BAR; 1R	BAR; 2R	BAR; QF	BAR; SF	BAR; 1R	BAR; 2R	BAR; 3R	BAR; 2R	BAR; 1R	BAR; 3R				
2024	WIG; 1R	WIG; 3R	LEI; 3R	LEI; 4R	HIL; 4R	HIL; 4R	LEI; 1R	LEI; 4R	HIL; 3R	HIL; 3R	HIL; DNP		MIL; QF	MIL; W	MIL; 3R	MIL; 3R	MIL; 1R	MIL; 3R	MIL; 1R	WIG; 3R	WIG; 4R	LEI; QF	LEI; QF	WIG; 3R	WIG; 3R	WIG; DNP	WIG; QF	WIG; QF	LEI; 1R	LEI; F				
2025	WIG; 4R	WIG; 3R	ROS; 4R	ROS; 1R	LEI; 3R	LEI; 1R	HIL; DNP		LEI; 3R	LEI; 1R	LEI; 1R	LEI; QF	ROS; SF	ROS; W	HIL; DNP		LEI; 1R	LEI; 4R	LEI; 3R	LEI; QF	LEI; 4R	HIL; DNP		MIL; 3R	MIL; F	HIL; DNP		LEI; QF	LEI; QF	LEI; 3R	WIG; 2R	WIG; 2R	WIG; DNP	
2026	HIL; DNP		WIG; QF	WIG; 1R	LEI; 1R	LEI; SF	LEI; 3R	LEI; 3R	WIG; 3R	WIG; 2R	Did not participate				LEI; 3R	LEI; F	LEI; 2R	LEI; QF	MIL; F	MIL; 1R	WIG; SF	WIG; 4R	Did not participate										LEI; 1R	LEI; 2R

==== World Series ====
Tournament	2021	2022	2023	2025	2026
Nordic Masters	SF	DNP	SF	QF	SF
US Masters	NH	QF	DNP		QF
Dutch Masters	NH	1R	NH	DNP	NH
Queensland Masters	NH	1R	NH		
New South Wales Masters	NH	W	DNP	NH	
New Zealand Masters	NH	F	DNP		W
Bahrain Masters	NH		QF	DNP	
Poland Masters	NH		DNP	1R	NH
Australian Masters	NH			DNP	SF

Performance Table Legend
W	Won the tournament	F	Finalist	SF	Semifinalist	QF	Quarterfinalist	#R; RR; Prel.	Lost in # round Round-robin; Preliminary round	DQ	Disqualified
DNQ	Did not qualify	DNP	Did not participate	WD	Withdrew	NH	Tournament not held	#R; RR; Prel.	Lost in # round Round-robin; Preliminary round	NYF	Not yet founded

== Nine-dart finishes ==
Jonny Clayton's televised nine-dart finishes
Date	Opponent	Tournament	Method
7 March 2020	(England) Chris Dobey	UK Open	3 x T20; 3 x T20; T20, T19, D12
7 April 2021	(Portugal) José de Sousa	Premier League	3 x T20; 3 x T20; T20, T19, D12
