= 2021 Masters (darts) =

Ninth staging of the Masters darts tournament of the PDC

2021 Ladbrokes Masters

Tournament information
- Dates: 29–31 January 2021
- Venue: Arena MK
- Location: Milton Keynes, England
- Organisation(s): Professional Darts Corporation (PDC)
- Format: Legs; Final: best of 21 legs
- Prize fund: £220,000
- Winner's share: £60,000
- High checkout: 170; Michael Smith (x2) Daryl Gurney

Champion(s)
- Jonny Clayton (WAL)

The 2021 PDC Masters (known for sponsorship reasons as the 2021 Ladbrokes Masters) was the ninth staging of the non-ranking Masters darts tournament, held by the Professional Darts Corporation (PDC). It was held from 29 to 31 January 2021, behind closed doors at Arena MK in Milton Keynes, England.

Peter Wright was the defending champion, after beating Michael Smith 11–10 in the 2020 final, but he lost 11–10 to Jonny Clayton in the semi-finals.

In its first major change since its inception in 2013, the field was increased from 16 to 24 players, with the top 8 players entering at the second round.

Jonny Clayton won his first individual televised title, beating Mervyn King 11–8 in the final, and by winning the tournament, he also secured his place in the 2021 Premier League, which he won. Clayton's winning run included a victory over Michael van Gerwen, which ended the so-called "van Gerwen curse", whereby any player who knocked out van Gerwen in a PDC major would subsequently lose in the next round.

The final itself was notable, as if the usual format of 16 players had been maintained, neither of the two finalists would have qualified for the tournament.

== Qualifiers ==
The Masters featured the top 24 players in the PDC Order of Merit after the 2021 PDC World Darts Championship, with the top 8 automatically qualifying for the second round. Dimitri Van den Bergh, Glen Durrant, Krzysztof Ratajski, José de Sousa, Jeffrey de Zwaan and Chris Dobey made their debuts in the event.

The following 24 players took part in the tournament:

1. Gerwyn Price (semi-finals)
2. Michael van Gerwen (second round)
3. Peter Wright (semi-finals)
4. Rob Cross (second round)
5. Nathan Aspinall (quarter-finals)
6. Dave Chisnall (quarter-finals)
7. James Wade (quarter-finals)
8. Gary Anderson (second round)
9. Michael Smith (first round)
10. Dimitri Van den Bergh (first round)
11. Daryl Gurney (second round)
12. Ian White (first round)
13. Glen Durrant (first round)
14. Krzysztof Ratajski (first round)
15. José de Sousa (first round)
16. Joe Cullen (second round)
17. Stephen Bunting (first round)
18. (Wales) Jonny Clayton (champion)
19. Simon Whitlock (second round)
20. Mervyn King (runner-up)
21. Mensur Suljović (second round)
22. Jeffrey de Zwaan (first round)
23. Chris Dobey (second round)
24. Adrian Lewis (quarter-finals)

== Prize money ==
The prize money was £220,000 in total, an increase of £20,000 from 2020 to incorporate the extra 8 players.

Stage (no. of players)		Prize money (Total: £220,000)
Winner	(1)	£60,000
Runner-up	(1)	£25,000
Semi-finalists	(2)	£17,500
Quarter-finalists	(4)	£10,000
Second round losers	(8)	£5,000
First round losers	(8)	£2,500

== Draw ==
First round (best of 11 legs); 29 January
16	Joe Cullen 102.26	6
17	Stephen Bunting 101.89	4
9	Michael Smith 95.78	5
24	Adrian Lewis 96.95	6
13	Glen Durrant 88.36	1
20	Mervyn King 101.97	6
12	Ian White 88.50	3
21	Mensur Suljović 89.08	6
15	José de Sousa 101.29	5
18	Jonny Clayton 102.93	6
10	Dimitri Van den Bergh 89.07	2
23	Chris Dobey 97.36	6
14	Krzysztof Ratajski 91.71	2
19	Simon Whitlock 97.95	6
11	Daryl Gurney 89.56	6
22	Jeffrey de Zwaan 85.10	5

Second round (best of 19 legs); 30 January
1	Gerwyn Price 104.37	10
16	Joe Cullen 92.56	3
8	Gary Anderson 91.66	8
24	Adrian Lewis 98.56	10
4	Rob Cross 94.05	5
20	Mervyn King 101.64	10
5	Nathan Aspinall 92.45	10
21	Mensur Suljović 95.35	9
2	Michael van Gerwen 96.56	9
18	Jonny Clayton 97.04	10
7	James Wade 97.82	10
23	Chris Dobey 94.57	4
3	Peter Wright 101.52	10
19	Simon Whitlock 105.90	8
6	Dave Chisnall 97.81	10
11	Daryl Gurney 96.19	9

Quarter-finals (best of 19 legs); 31 January
1	Gerwyn Price 105.60	10
24	Adrian Lewis 92.30	6
20	Mervyn King 101.76	10
5	Nathan Aspinall 95.83	3
18	Jonny Clayton 105.41	10
7	James Wade 104.02	9
3	Peter Wright 104.72	10
6	Dave Chisnall 97.51	5

Semi-finals (best of 21 legs); 31 January
1	Gerwyn Price 99.46	10
20	Mervyn King 97.18	11
18	Jonny Clayton 104.09	11
3	Peter Wright 99.95	10

Final (best of 21 legs); 31 January
20	Mervyn King 94.95	8
18	Jonny Clayton 104.10	11
