= 2022 Premier League Darts =

Darts competition

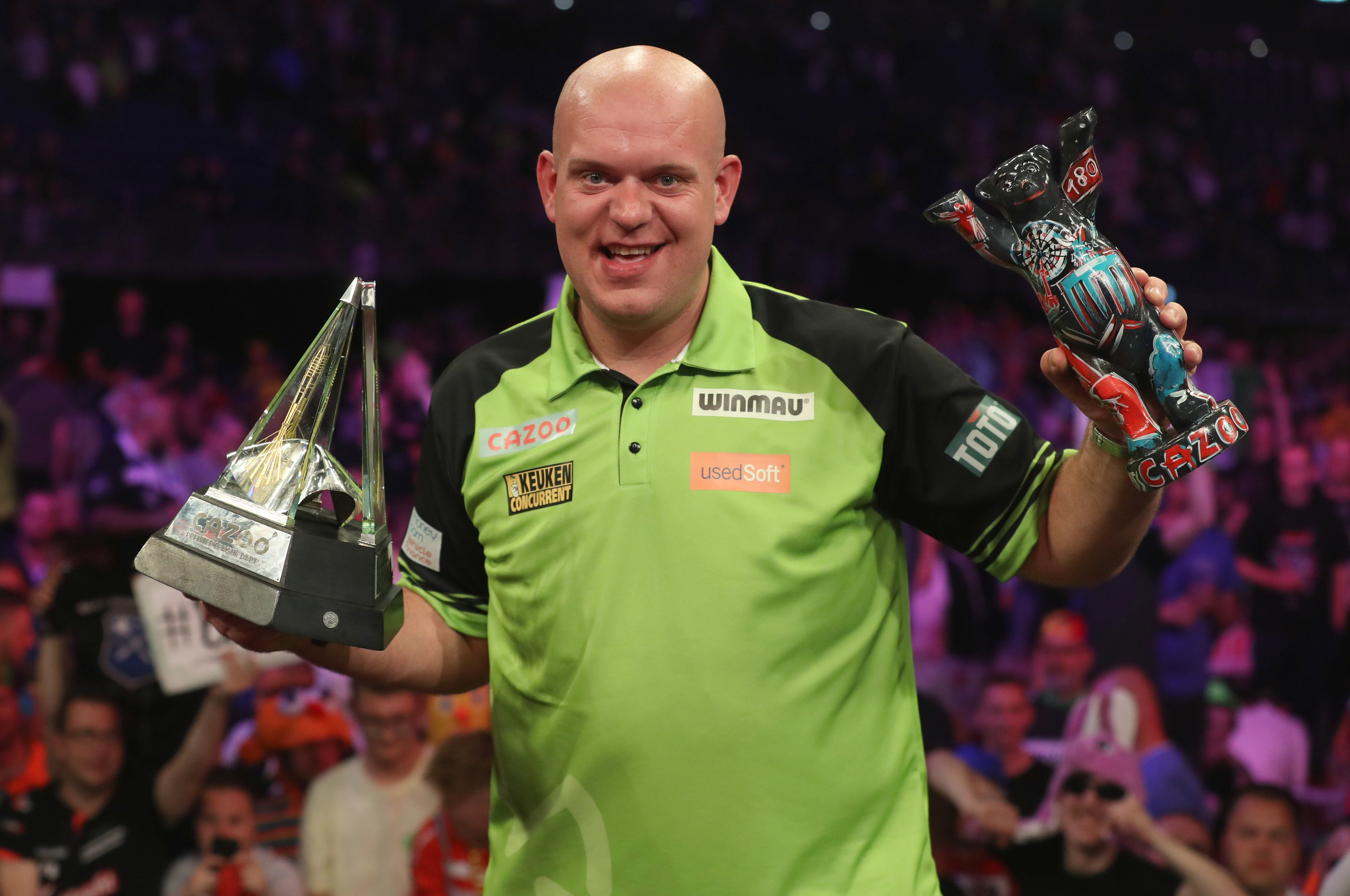
- Winner Michael van Gerwen

Tournament information
- Dates: 3 February–13 June 2022
- Participants: 8

Final positions
- Champion: Michael van Gerwen
- Runner-up: Joe Cullen

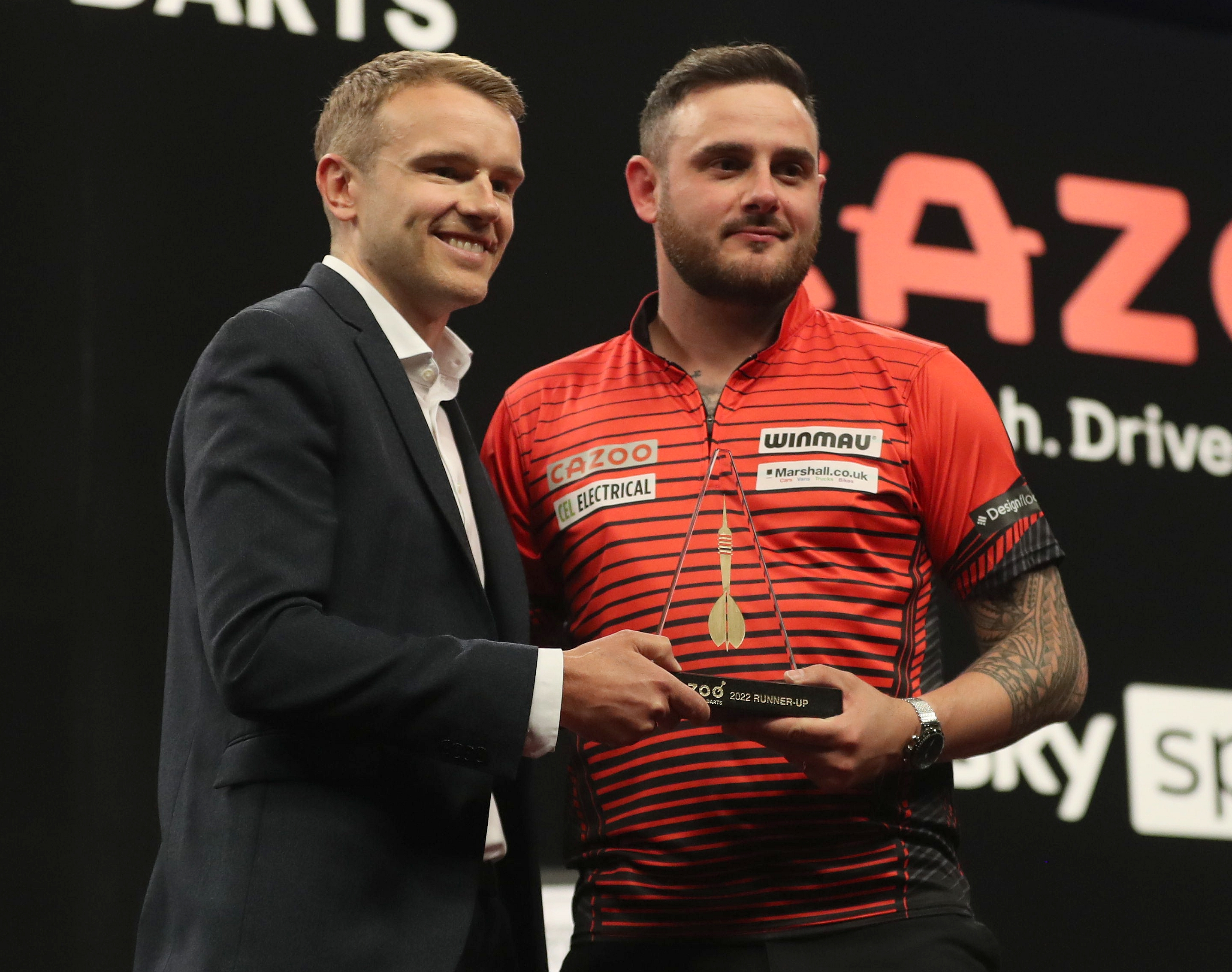
Runner-up Joe Cullen

The 2022 Cazoo Premier League Darts was a darts tournament, organised by the Professional Darts Corporation – the eighteenth edition of the tournament. The event began on Thursday 3 February 2022, at the Cardiff International Arena in Cardiff, and finished with the play-offs, at the Mercedes-Benz Arena in Berlin on Monday 13 June 2022.

Jonny Clayton was the reigning champion after defeating José de Sousa 11–5 in the 2021 final, but he lost 10–4 to debutant Joe Cullen in the semi-finals.

Michael van Gerwen won a record-equalling sixth Premier League title by defeating Cullen 11–10 in the final, after Cullen missed a dart at double to win the title, which would have made him the third debutant in a row (after Glen Durrant and Clayton) to win the title at his first attempt.

On Night 3, Gerwyn Price hit nine-dart finishes in consecutive matches (in his semi-final against Michael van Gerwen and the final against James Wade), making him the second person in Premier League history to hit two nine-darters on the same night, after Phil Taylor, who did both of his in the 2010 Premier League Darts final against Wade.

This tournament also saw the beginning of the PDC's new partnership with Winmau as their dartboard supplier.

== Format ==
On 14 January 2022, the PDC announced a new format for the Premier League. Instead of the previously used round robin format, the event consisted of an eight-person knockout bracket every night. Each of the seven matches was played over the best-of-11 legs. The players were guaranteed to meet each other once in the quarter-finals throughout the first seven weeks and once in the quarterfinals in weeks 9–15, with weeks 8 and 16 being drawn based on the league standings at that point. Players received two points per semi-final finish, three points per runner-up finish, and five points per final win.

Though it was assured that players meet each other only twice in the quarter-finals on regular nights (i.e. weeks 1–7 and 9–15), no other guarantees are made. So certain players were drawn onto the same semi-final branch more often than others. For example, while Price–Wright, van Gerwen–Anderson and Wade–Smith pairs were on the same branch only when they play each other in the quarter-finals, a Wright–Anderson and van Gerwen–Smith final was possible only twice on the regular 14 nights.

Following the regular phase, the top four players in the league table contested the two knockout semi-finals with 1st playing 4th and 2nd playing 3rd.

== Venues ==
2022 saw the return of the Brighton Centre, which was last used as a Premier League venue in 2017.

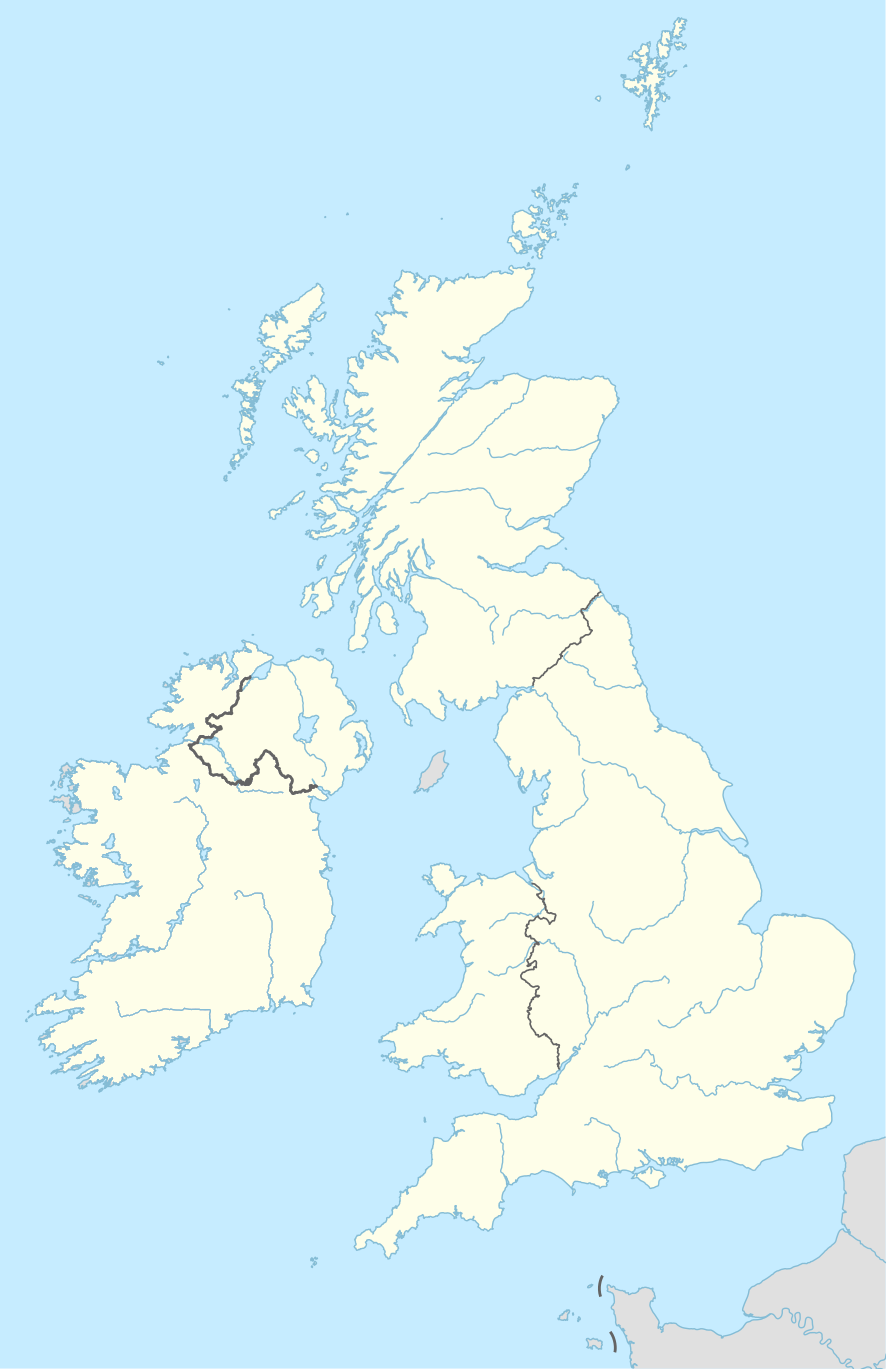
Locations of the 2022 Premier League venues in the UK and Ireland.
Other locations of the 2022 Premier League venues in Europe.

(Wales) Cardiff	(England) Liverpool	(Northern Ireland) Belfast	(England) Exeter
Cardiff International Arena; Thursday 3 February	Liverpool Arena; Thursday 10 February	SSE Arena Belfast; Thursday 17 February	Westpoint Exeter; Thursday 3 March
(England) Brighton	(England) Nottingham	(Netherlands) Rotterdam	(England) Birmingham
Brighton Centre; Thursday 10 March	Nottingham Arena; Thursday 17 March	Rotterdam Ahoy; Thursday 24 March	Arena Birmingham; Thursday 31 March
(England) Leeds	(England) Manchester	(Scotland) Aberdeen	(Republic of Ireland) Dublin
Leeds Arena; Thursday 7 April	Manchester Arena; Thursday 14 April	P&J Live; Thursday 21 April	3Arena; Thursday 28 April
(Scotland) Glasgow	(England) Sheffield	(England) London	(England) Newcastle
OVO Hydro; Thursday 5 May	Sheffield Arena; Thursday 12 May	The O_{2} Thursday 19 May	Newcastle Arena; Thursday 26 May
(Germany) Berlin
Mercedes-Benz Arena; Monday 13 June

== Prize money ==
The prize money for the 2022 tournament increased to £1 million, including a £10,000 bonus to each night's winner.

Stage	Prize money
Winner	£275,000
Runner-up	£125,000
Semi-finalists (x2)	£85,000
5th place	£75,000
6th place	£70,000
7th place	£65,000
8th place	£60,000
Weekly Winner Bonus (x16)	£10,000
Total	£1,000,000

== Players ==
Usually, the top four players in the PDC Order of Merit following the 2022 PDC World Darts Championship would be joined by six invited players, of which they would have been announced following the World Championship final. However, this year, following the announcement of the new format, it was announced that only 8 players will participate in 2022.

It was revealed that the new format would encompass eight players, each playing against each other in a knockout tournament each night. The winner of each night would receive an additional £10,000 towards their prize money. Those who make it out of the last 8 each receive 2 points, the runner-up will receive 3 points and the winner receives 5.

The full list of players was announced on 31 January 2022, with the Top 6 players on the PDC Order of Merit joined by the reigning Premier League champion Jonny Clayton, and debutant Joe Cullen, fresh from winning his first televised title at the Masters the previous evening.

This new format saw “Judgement Night” and relegation disappear from the league.

Player	Appearance in Premier League	Consecutive Streak	Order of Merit Rank on 31/1/22	Previous best performance
Gerwyn Price	4th	1 (Note: Price qualified for the 2021 Premier League Darts, but withdrew following a positive COVID-19 test.)	1	5th Place (2019, 2020)
Peter Wright	9th	9	2	Runner-up (2017)
Michael van Gerwen	10th	10	3	Winner (2013, 2016, 2017, 2018, 2019)
James Wade	12th	2	4	Winner (2009)
Michael Smith	5th	1	5	Runner-up (2018)
Gary Anderson	11th	3 (Note: Anderson qualified for the 2019 Premier League Darts, but withdrew following an injury.)	6	Winner (2011, 2015)
Jonny Clayton	2nd	2	8	Winner (2021)
Joe Cullen	1st	1	11	Debut

== League stage ==
=== 3 February – Night 1 ===
(Wales) Cardiff International Arena, Cardiff

Quarter-finals (best of 11 legs)
Jonny Clayton 103.61	6
Joe Cullen 95.36	2
Gerwyn Price 89.12	3
James Wade 88.78	6
Peter Wright 100.13	6
Michael Smith 88.57	3
Michael van Gerwen 96.12	4
Gary Anderson 91.37	6

Semi-finals (best of 11 legs)
Jonny Clayton 96.49	6
James Wade 91.45	4
Peter Wright 98.43	6
Gary Anderson 99.98	5

Final (best of 11 legs)
Jonny Clayton 88.72	1
Peter Wright 113.02	6

Night 1 Statistics
Night's Total Average: 95.80
Highest Checkout: Gary Anderson 155
Most 180s (in one match): Jonny Clayton and Joe Cullen 5
Night's 180s: 33

=== 10 February – Night 2 ===
(England) Liverpool Arena, Liverpool

Quarter-finals (best of 11 legs)
Peter Wright 84.71	1
Michael van Gerwen 102.98	6
Jonny Clayton 100.82	6
Michael Smith 95.95	3
James Wade 87.85	3
Joe Cullen 93.74	6
Gerwyn Price 96.33	6
Gary Anderson 90.85	3

Semi-finals (best of 11 legs)
Michael van Gerwen 105.11	4
Jonny Clayton 106.64	6
Joe Cullen 101.54	6
Gerwyn Price 95.59	5

Final (best of 11 legs)
Jonny Clayton 88.13	6
Joe Cullen 93.12	4

Night 2 Statistics
Night's Total Average: 95.95
Highest Checkout: Gerwyn Price 156
Most 180s (in one match): Joe Cullen 4 (x2)
Night's 180s: 34

=== 17 February – Night 3 ===
(Northern Ireland) SSE Arena, Belfast

Quarter-finals (best of 11 legs)
Michael Smith 103.55	3
Gerwyn Price 108.54	6
Joe Cullen 91.88	3
Michael van Gerwen 91.05	6
Gary Anderson 96.43	4
Peter Wright 100.35	6
James Wade 93.13	6
Jonny Clayton 94.45	3

Semi-finals (best of 11 legs)
Gerwyn Price 108.90	6
Michael van Gerwen 106.48	5
Peter Wright 105.20	4
James Wade 102.81	6

Final (best of 11 legs)
Gerwyn Price 105.32	6
James Wade 99.91	4

Night 3 Statistics
Night's Total Average: 100.57
Highest Checkout: Gerwyn Price 170
Most 180s (in one match): Gerwyn Price (x2) and Michael van Gerwen 5
Night's 180s: 43
Nine-Dart Finish: Gerwyn Price (x2)

=== 3 March – Night 4 ===
(England) Westpoint Exeter, Exeter

Quarter-finals (best of 11 legs)
Jonny Clayton 97.39	1
Michael van Gerwen 102.36	6
Michael Smith 97.31	6
Joe Cullen 93.89	5
Gerwyn Price 94.89	2
Peter Wright 101.06	6
James Wade 97.01	6
Gary Anderson 99.76	4

Semi-finals (best of 11 legs)
Michael van Gerwen 104.37	6
Michael Smith 97.14	2
Peter Wright 103.46	6
James Wade 85.81	2

Final (best of 11 legs)
Michael van Gerwen 99.10	6
Peter Wright 87.52	0

Night 4 Statistics
Night's Total Average: 97.22
Highest Checkout: Joe Cullen 145
Most 180s (in one match): Peter Wright 5
Night's 180s: 39

=== 10 March – Night 5 ===
(England) Brighton Centre, Brighton

Quarter-finals (best of 11 legs)
Gary Anderson 85.71	1
Michael Smith 90.89	6
Peter Wright 102.92	5
Jonny Clayton 92.61	6
Michael van Gerwen 96.41	6
James Wade 92.32	5
Joe Cullen w/o	6
Gerwyn Price w/d	0 (Note: Price couldn't compete at Brighton, due to a hand injury. Under the rules of the competition, his opponent, Cullen, was given a 6–0 win.)

Semi-finals (best of 11 legs)
Michael Smith 89.19	6
Jonny Clayton 90.25	2
Michael van Gerwen 101.79	6
Joe Cullen 88.84	1

Final (best of 11 legs)
Michael Smith 100.61	4
Michael van Gerwen 103.89	6

Night 5 Statistics
Night's Total Average: 94.62
Highest Checkout: Michael van Gerwen 170
Most 180s (in one match): Michael Smith 5
Night's 180s: 31

=== 17 March – Night 6 ===
(England) Nottingham Arena, Nottingham

Quarter-finals (best of 11 legs)
Michael Smith 102.92	6
James Wade 102.63	1
Michael van Gerwen 95.93	4
Gerwyn Price 102.70	6
Gary Anderson 89.93	6
Jonny Clayton 91.65	5
Joe Cullen 86.30	4
Peter Wright 87.02	6

Semi-finals (best of 11 legs)
Michael Smith 89.11	6
Gerwyn Price 86.25	4
Gary Anderson 101.88	6
Peter Wright 95.33	3

Final (best of 11 legs)
Michael Smith 99.02	4
Gary Anderson 104.24	6

Night 6 Statistics
Night's Total Average: 95.35
Highest Checkout: Michael van Gerwen 144
Most 180s (in one match): James Wade 6
Night's 180s: 40

=== 24 March – Night 7 ===
(Netherlands) Rotterdam Ahoy, Rotterdam

Quarter-finals (best of 11 legs)
Peter Wright 95.55	6
James Wade 91.09	5
Gary Anderson 88.76	5
Joe Cullen 92.82	6
Jonny Clayton 98.50	6
Gerwyn Price 94.91	5
Michael van Gerwen 89.53	6
Michael Smith 96.82	5

Semi-finals (best of 11 legs)
Peter Wright 87.87	4
Joe Cullen 88.17	6
Jonny Clayton 98.08	3
Michael van Gerwen 103.28	6

Final (best of 11 legs)
Joe Cullen 90.64	6
Michael van Gerwen 97.49	5

Night 7 Statistics
Night's Total Average: 93.82
Highest Checkout: Gary Anderson 164
Most 180s (in one match): Joe Cullen 7
Night's 180s: 40

=== 31 March – Night 8 ===
(England) Arena Birmingham, Birmingham

Quarter-finals (best of 11 legs)
1	Michael van Gerwen 87.93	2
8	James Wade 99.00	6
4	Joe Cullen 93.69	6
5	Gerwyn Price 92.02	3
2	Peter Wright 97.20	6
7	Gary Anderson 92.49	5
3	Jonny Clayton 99.53	6
6	Michael Smith 99.81	1

Semi-finals (best of 11 legs)
8	James Wade 94.78	6
4	Joe Cullen 86.38	2
2	Peter Wright 107.71	4
3	Jonny Clayton 103.68	6

Final (best of 11 legs)
8	James Wade 83.97	1
3	Jonny Clayton 111.16	6

Night 8 Statistics
Night's Total Average: 96.38
Highest Checkout: Peter Wright 156
Most 180s (in one match): Peter Wright 6
Night's 180s: 29

=== 7 April – Night 9 ===
(England) Leeds Arena, Leeds

Quarter-finals (best of 11 legs)
Michael Smith 102.21	2
Peter Wright 103.99	6
Gary Anderson w/d	0 (Note: Anderson tested positive for COVID-19, and therefore had to withdraw. Under the rules of the competition, his opponent, van Gerwen, was given a 6–0 win.)
Michael van Gerwen w/o	6
Joe Cullen 87.77	1
Jonny Clayton 98.25	6
James Wade 90.65	6
Gerwyn Price 97.32	5

Semi-finals (best of 11 legs)
Peter Wright 86.37	3
Michael van Gerwen 90.74	6
Jonny Clayton 96.96	4
James Wade 96.17	6

Final (best of 11 legs)
Michael van Gerwen 103.87	6
James Wade 93.59	1

Night 9 Statistics
Night's Total Average: 95.66
Highest Checkout: Peter Wright 108
Most 180s (in one match): Michael van Gerwen 5
Night's 180s: 23

=== 14 April – Night 10 ===
(England) Manchester Arena, Manchester

Quarter-finals (best of 11 legs)
Peter Wright 93.98	4
Gerwyn Price 97.01	6
Gary Anderson 94.07	2
James Wade 100.10	6
Michael van Gerwen 105.14	5
Jonny Clayton 109.10	6
Joe Cullen 94.38	6
Michael Smith 89.65	2

Semi-finals (best of 11 legs)
Gerwyn Price 90.49	2
James Wade 93.00	6
Jonny Clayton 101.76	3
Joe Cullen 94.99	6

Final (best of 11 legs)
James Wade 105.48	6
Joe Cullen 96.93	5

Night 10 Statistics
Night's Total Average: 97.58
Highest Checkout: James Wade 161
Most 180s (in one match): Peter Wright 5
Night's 180s: 33

=== 21 April – Night 11 ===
(Scotland) P&J Live, Aberdeen

Quarter-finals (best of 11 legs)
Jonny Clayton 93.53	6
Gary Anderson 87.44	2
Peter Wright 103.22	6
Joe Cullen 96.08	5
James Wade 89.74	6
Michael Smith 91.04	5
Gerwyn Price 92.10	3
Michael van Gerwen 106.93	6

Semi-finals (best of 11 legs)
Jonny Clayton 96.21	6
Peter Wright 99.60	5
James Wade 88.25	3
Michael van Gerwen 99.84	6

Final (best of 11 legs)
Jonny Clayton 103.40	6
Michael van Gerwen 102.76	5

Night 11 Statistics
Night's Total Average: 96.44
Highest Checkout: James Wade 110
Most 180s (in one match): Jonny Clayton (x2) and Peter Wright (x2) 4
Night's 180s: 34

=== 28 April – Night 12 ===
(Republic of Ireland) 3Arena, Dublin

Quarter-finals (best of 11 legs)
James Wade 99.67	6
Michael van Gerwen 103.03	5
Gerwyn Price 90.06	6
Joe Cullen 81.02	3
Michael Smith 102.14	6
Gary Anderson 102.75	2
Jonny Clayton 100.44	6
Peter Wright 97.09	3

Semi-finals (best of 11 legs)
James Wade 114.73	6
Gerwyn Price 99.17	1
Michael Smith 104.73	4
Jonny Clayton 104.16	6

Final (best of 11 legs)
James Wade 95.38	6
Jonny Clayton 101.29	5

Night 12 Statistics
Night's Total Average: 99.69
Highest Checkout: Michael Smith 150
Most 180s (in one match): Michael van Gerwen 6
Night's 180s: 43

=== 5 May – Night 13 ===
(Scotland) OVO Hydro, Glasgow

Quarter-finals (best of 11 legs)
Peter Wright 87.10	2
Gary Anderson 97.21	6
Jonny Clayton 95.55	6
James Wade 93.10	2
Gerwyn Price 94.50	3
Michael Smith 99.19	6
Michael van Gerwen 98.36	6
Joe Cullen 90.59	5

Semi-finals (best of 11 legs)
Gary Anderson 89.15	4
Jonny Clayton 98.53	6
Michael Smith 100.01	5
Michael van Gerwen 99.04	6

Final (best of 11 legs)
Jonny Clayton 99.81	6
Michael van Gerwen 96.41	3

Night 13 Statistics
Night's Total Average: 95.61
Highest Checkout: Gary Anderson 150
Most 180s (in one match): Michael van Gerwen 6
Night's 180s: 32

=== 12 May – Night 14 ===
(England) Sheffield Arena, Sheffield

Quarter-finals (best of 11 legs)
Joe Cullen w/o	6
James Wade w/d	0 (Note: Wade was forced withdraw after falling ill during the 2022 European Darts Open, and was still in hospital in Leverkusen, after being ruled unable to fly home. Under the rules of the competition, his opponent, Cullen, was given a 6–0 win.)
Gary Anderson 94.80	4
Gerwyn Price 100.26	6
Michael van Gerwen 103.18	6
Peter Wright 90.93	1
Michael Smith 95.67	6
Jonny Clayton 96.53	5

Semi-finals (best of 11 legs)
Joe Cullen 90.69	3
Gerwyn Price 100.82	6
Michael van Gerwen 95.15	6
Michael Smith 94.59	5

Final (best of 11 legs)
Gerwyn Price 94.46	6
Michael van Gerwen 98.37	5

Night 14 Statistics
Night's Total Average: 96.29
Highest Checkout: Gary Anderson 128
Most 180s (in one match): Michael Smith (x2) and Gerwyn Price 4
Night's 180s: 27

=== 19 May – Night 15 ===
(England) The O_{2}, London

Quarter-finals (best of 11 legs)
Gerwyn Price 91.99	3
Jonny Clayton 96.22	6
Michael Smith 88.63	6
Michael van Gerwen 93.22	5
James Wade 80.74	3
Peter Wright 94.30	6
Joe Cullen 93.00	6
Gary Anderson 83.97	1

Semi-finals (best of 11 legs)
Jonny Clayton 97.16	6
Michael Smith 92.70	4
Peter Wright 89.92	1
Joe Cullen 94.24	6

Final (best of 11 legs)
Jonny Clayton 91.44	4
Joe Cullen 93.04	6

Night 15 Statistics
Night's Total Average: 91.34
Highest Checkout: Michael van Gerwen 145
Most 180s (in one match): Joe Cullen 4
Night's 180s: 22

=== 26 May – Night 16 ===
(England) Newcastle Arena, Newcastle

Quarter-finals (best of 11 legs)
1	Jonny Clayton 94.95	6
8	Gary Anderson 101.07	5
4	Joe Cullen 94.29	6
5	Peter Wright 96.96	4
2	Michael van Gerwen 95.29	4
7	Michael Smith 96.48	6
3	James Wade 91.07	4
6	Gerwyn Price 89.69	6

Semi-finals (best of 11 legs)
1	Jonny Clayton 96.14	6
4	Joe Cullen 92.28	4
7	Michael Smith 96.80	6
6	Gerwyn Price 88.24	3

Final (best of 11 legs)
1	Jonny Clayton 94.12	3
7	Michael Smith 98.77	6

Night 16 Statistics
Night's Total Average: 94.73
Highest Checkout: Michael van Gerwen 155
Most 180s (in one match): Jonny Clayton and Michael Smith 4
Night's 180s: 29

== 13 June – Play-offs ==
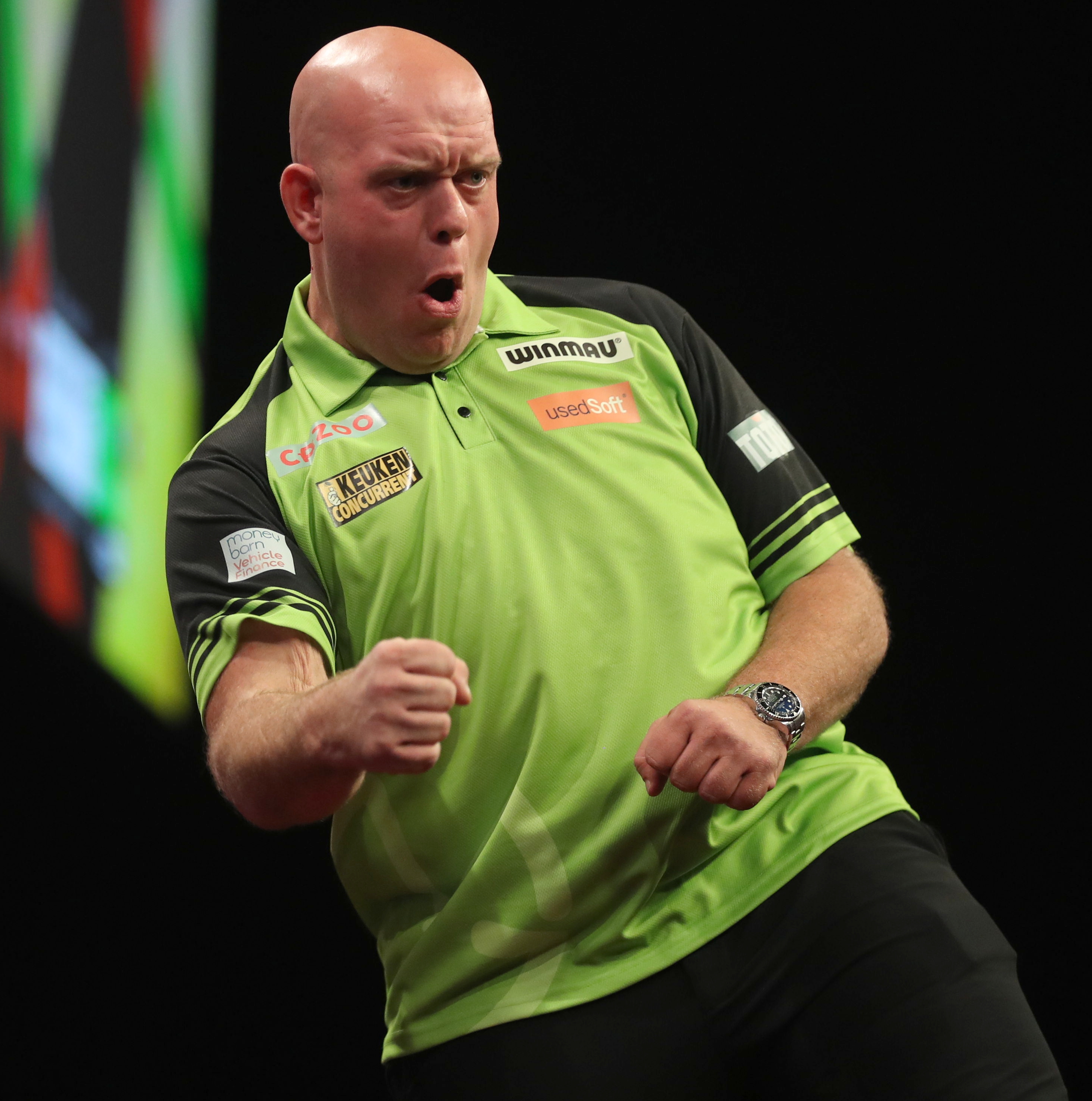
Michael van Gerwen

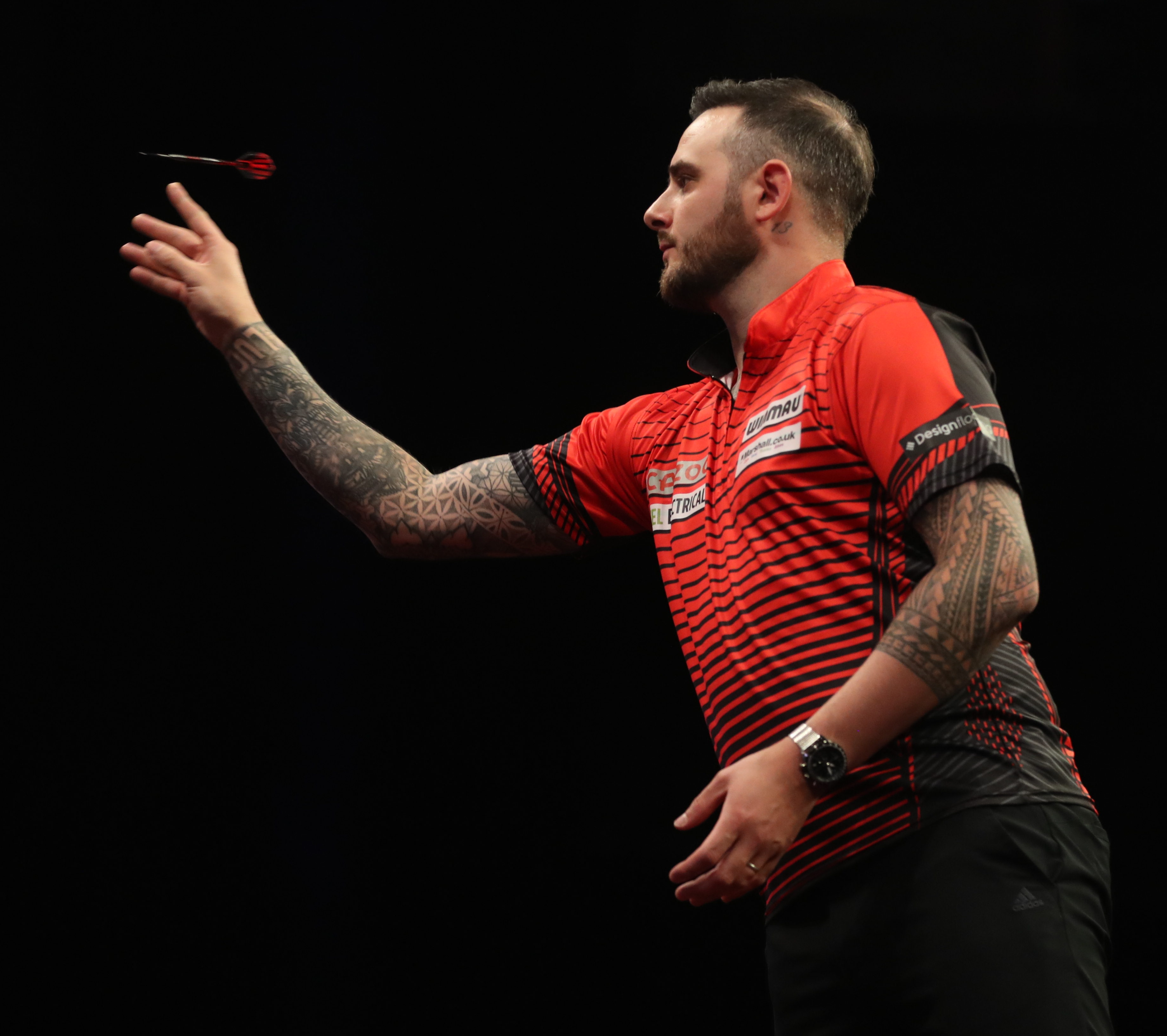
Joe Cullen

The top four players of the league stage contest in the play-offs to decide the champion of the Premier League.

(Germany) Mercedes-Benz Arena, Berlin

	Score	
Semi-finals (best of 19 legs)
Jonny Clayton 93.59	4 – 10	Joe Cullen 100.76
Michael van Gerwen 99.76	10 – 4	James Wade 93.48
Final (best of 21 legs)
Joe Cullen 99.36	10 – 11	Michael van Gerwen 99.10
Night's Total Average: 97.68
Highest Checkout: Joe Cullen 141
Most 180s In One Match: Joe Cullen 11
Night's 180s: 27

== Table and streaks ==
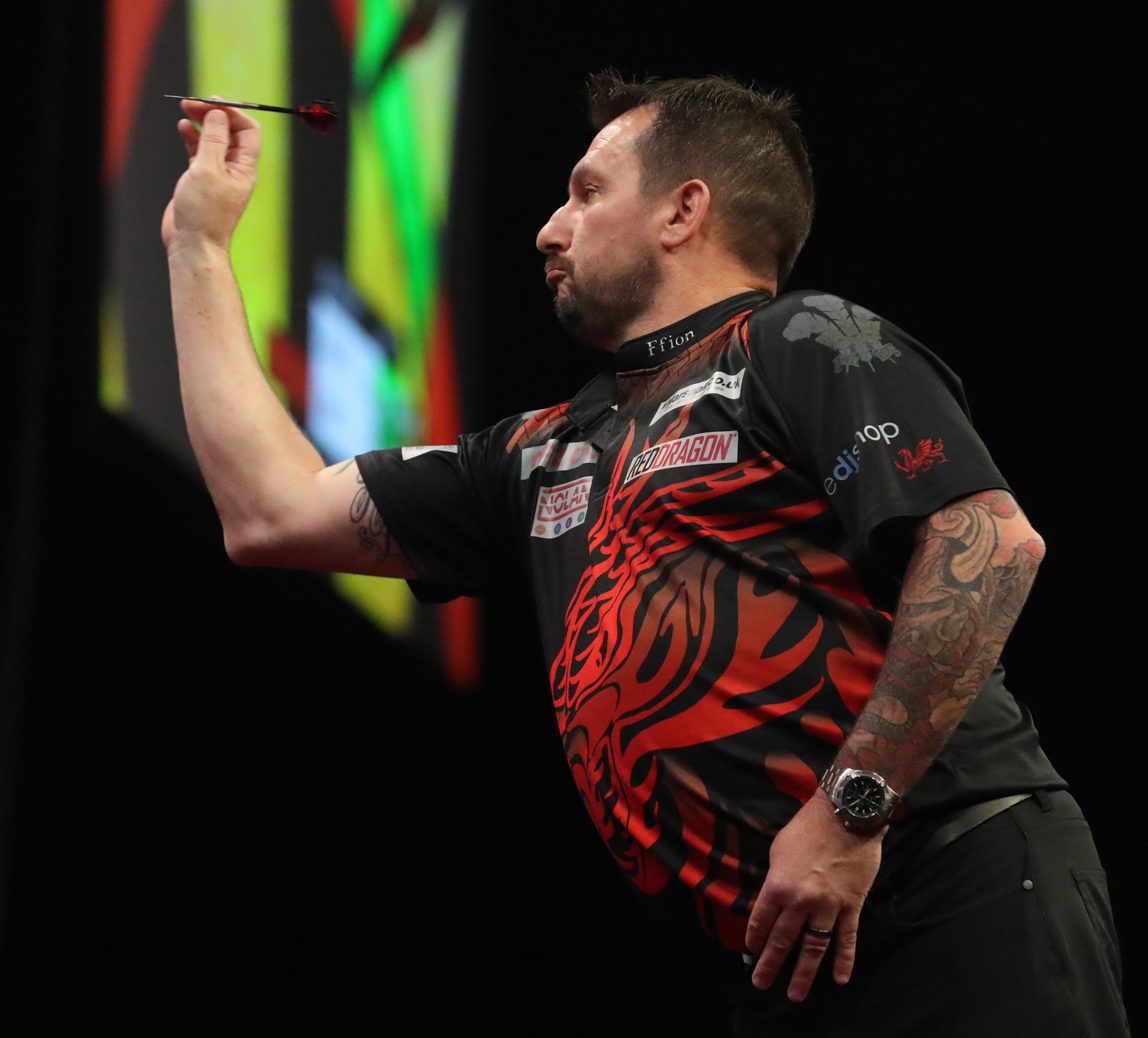
Jonny Clayton

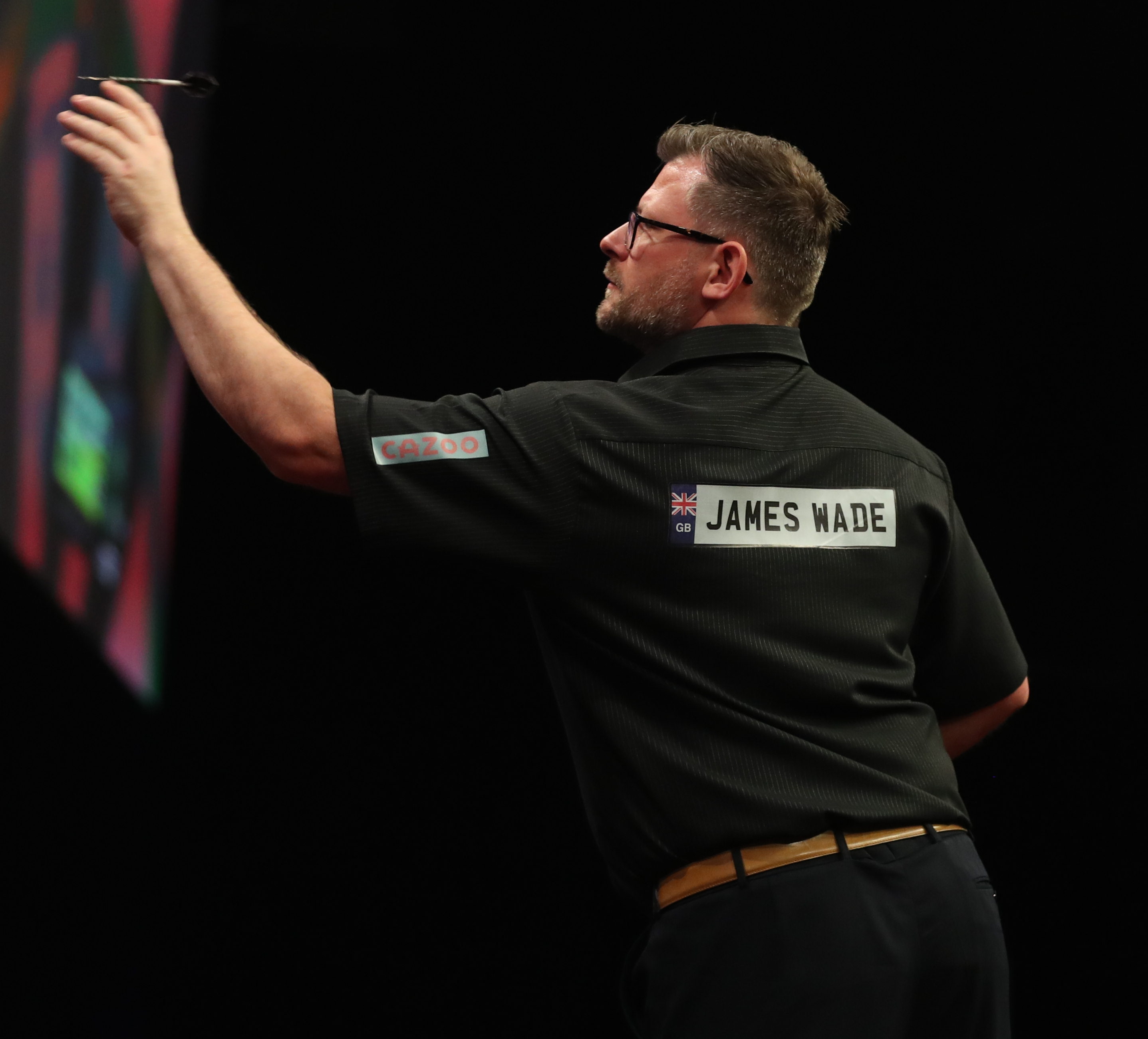
James Wade

=== Table ===
Five points are awarded for a night win, three points for the runner-up and two points for the semi-finalists. When players are tied on points, leg difference is used first as a tie-breaker, after that legs won against throw and then tournament average.

The top 4 players after 16 nights advance to the play-offs on 13 June.

Final Standings (Note: wins after withdrawals; (Cullen's 6-0 over Price on Night 5, and Wade on night 14, and van Gerwen's 6–0 over Anderson on Night 9), do count towards Cullen's, and van Gerwen's standings, but not towards Price's, Anderson's and Wade's standings, resulting in an uneven ratio of games won and lost, plus in an overall league leg difference of +18.)

Pos	Name	Nights					Matches			Legs				Scoring						
Pos	Name	Pts	W	RU	SF	QF	Pld	W	L	LF	LA	LD	LWAT	100+	140+	180	A	HC	CR	C%
1	Jonny Clayton	40	4	4	4	4	36	24	12	183	155	+28	63	458	255	93	97.98	144	183/428	43%
2	Michael van Gerwen (C)	31	3	4	2	7	32	19	13	170	129	+41	61	330	198	82	99.29	170	164/424	39%
3	James Wade	25	2	3	3	8	28	15	13	128	130	–2	37	369	198	45	94.36	161	128/294	44%
4	Joe Cullen (RU)	24	2	2	4	8	28	14	14	131	124	+7	46	256	124	75	92.14	145	119/313	38%
5	Peter Wright	22	1	1	7	7	27	12	15	116	131	–15	34	322	207	68	96.69	156	116/292	40%
6	Michael Smith	21	1	2	5	8	27	12	15	124	128	–4	40	274	178	75	96.41	150	124/289	43%
7	Gerwyn Price	20	2	0	5	9	24	11	13	108	120	–12	37	266	150	46	95.86	170	108/273	40%
8	Gary Anderson	9	1	0	2	13	19	5	14	77	102	–25	23	225	98	43	94.31	164	77/186	41%

(C) Champion after the playoffs, (RU) Runner-up after the playoffs

=== Streaks ===
Player	Nights																
Player	1	2	3	4	5	6	7	8	9	10	11	12	13	14	15	16	Play-offs
Jonny Clayton	RU	W	QF		SF	QF	SF	W	SF		W	RU	W	QF	RU		SF
Michael van Gerwen	QF	SF		W		QF	RU	QF	W	QF	RU	QF	RU		QF		W
James Wade	SF	QF	RU	SF	QF			RU		W	SF	W	QF	WD	QF		SF
Joe Cullen	QF	RU	QF		SF	QF	W	SF	QF	RU	QF			SF	W	SF	RU
Peter Wright	W	QF	SF	RU	QF	SF				QF	SF	QF			SF	QF	DNQ
Michael Smith	QF			SF	RU		QF					SF				W	DNQ
Gerwyn Price	QF	SF	W	QF	WD	SF	QF			SF	QF	SF	QF	W	QF	SF	DNQ
Gary Anderson	SF	QF				W	QF		WD	QF			SF	QF			DNQ

Legend:	DNQ	Did not qualify	WD	Withdrew	QF	Lost in quarterfinals	SF	Semi-finalist	RU	Runner-up	W	Night winner

=== Positions by Week ===
Player	Nights															
Player	1	2	3	4	5	6	7	8	9	10	11	12	13	14	15	16
Jonny Clayton	2	1	1	3	3	3	3	2	2	2	1	1	1	1	1	1
Michael van Gerwen	5	4	5	2	1	1	1	1	1	1	2	2	2	2	2	2
James Wade	4	7	4	5	5	7	8	5	4	3	4	3	3	3	3	3
Joe Cullen	8	3	6	6	6	8	4	4	5	5	5	5	5	6	4	4
Peter Wright	1	2	3	1	2	2	2	3	3	4	3	4	4	4	5	5
Michael Smith	6	8	8	8	7	5	6	7	7	7	7	7	7	7	7	6
Gerwyn Price	7	5	2	4	4	4	5	6	6	6	6	6	6	5	6	7
Gary Anderson	3	6	7	7	8	6	7	8	8	8	8	8	8	8	8	8
