= 2021 Premier League Darts =

Darts competition

2021 Unibet Premier League Darts

Tournament information
- Dates: 5 April–28 May 2021
- Nine-dart finish: Jonny Clayton; José de Sousa

Champion(s)
- Jonny Clayton (WAL)

The 2021 Unibet Premier League Darts was a darts tournament organised by the Professional Darts Corporation and the seventeenth edition of the tournament. The event was scheduled to begin on Thursday 4 February at the Cardiff International Arena in Cardiff and end with the play-offs at the Mercedes-Benz Arena in Berlin on Thursday 27 May, but due to the continuation of the COVID-19 outbreak, was delayed to begin with the first nine rounds taking place from 5 April behind closed doors at Arena MK, Milton Keynes. On 22 March 2021, it was then confirmed that all the fixtures would take place in Milton Keynes, with the playoffs taking place on Friday 28 May; up to 1,000 people were allowed to attend from Monday 24 May.

Glen Durrant was the reigning champion, having beaten Nathan Aspinall 11–8 in the 2020 final, but a run of seven successive defeats saw him eliminated on night seven; Durrant eventually became the first player in Premier League Darts history to fail to score a single point. Rob Cross was also eliminated from the competition for a second consecutive year on the eighth night, despite earning seven points, which is the most by an eliminated player since elimination came into effect in 2013.

Two nine-dart finishes were thrown during the tournament. Jonny Clayton threw a nine-darter against José de Sousa on Night Three, and the very next day, de Sousa threw a nine-darter of his own against Nathan Aspinall. He also hit 11 maximum scores of 180 during the match, equalling the Premier League record set by Gary Anderson in 2011. De Sousa threw 96 maximums during the tournament, surpassing Gary Anderson's record of 79.

For the first time, the playoffs featured four players from four nations: Michael van Gerwen from the Netherlands, Jose de Sousa from Portugal, Nathan Aspinall from England], and Jonny Clayton from Wales.

Jonny Clayton won his second individual televised major title, defeating fellow debutant José de Sousa 11–5 in the final. He became the first Welshman to win the event, the first champion to have finished fourth in the league phase, and the first person to defeat Michael van Gerwen in a Premier League semi-final.

== Format ==
The tournament format reverted to that used in 2018, with a permanent list of ten players, instead of nine players and a guest "challenger" each week, as had been used in 2019 & 2020.

Phase 1: In each round, the ten players play each other in five matches. Phase 1 matches have a maximum of twelve legs, allowing for the winner being first to seven or a six-six draw. At the end of Phase 1, the bottom two players are eliminated from the competition.

Phase 2: In each round, the remaining eight players play each other in four matches. Phase 2 matches have a maximum of fourteen legs, allowing for the winner being first to eight or a seven-seven draw. At the end of Phase 2, the bottom four players in the league table are eliminated from the competition.

Play-off Night: The top four players in the league table contest the two knockout semi-finals with 1st playing 4th and 2nd playing 3rd. The semi-finals are first to 10 legs (best of 19). The two winning semi-finalists meet in the final which is first to 11 legs (best of 21).

== Venues ==
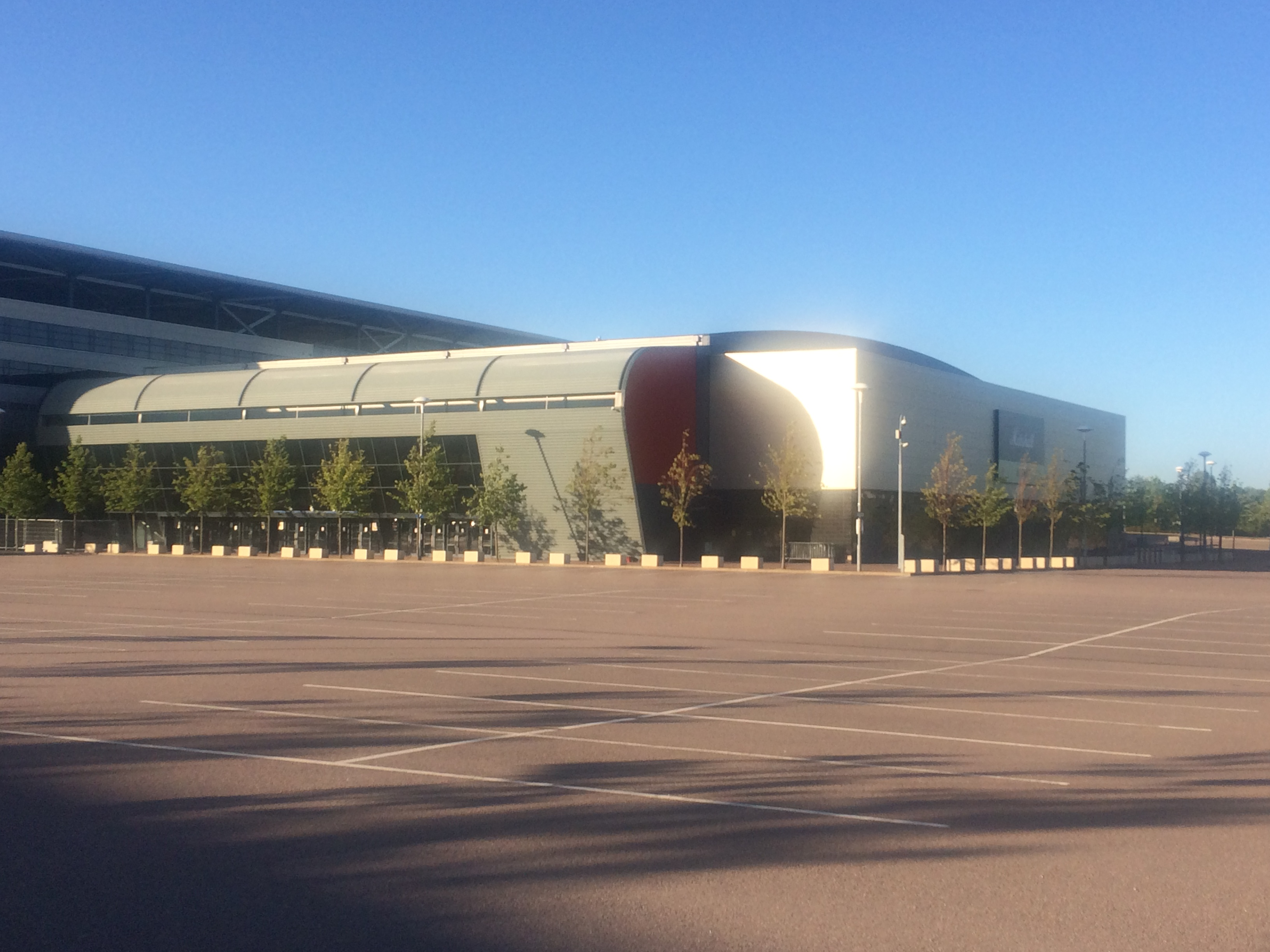
Arena MK, Milton Keynes, was the only venue to host the Premier League in 2021.

The announced calendar included The Brighton Centre being restored to the calendar, having last hosted the Premier League in 2017. The initial calendar also restored rounds in Birmingham, Belfast, Leeds, Berlin, Rotterdam, Glasgow, Manchester, Newcastle, Sheffield and London; all of which had been scheduled for 2020 but cancelled due to the COVID-19 pandemic; with Berlin replacing London as the scheduled host of the final. Milton Keynes and Coventry, which hosted rounds in 2020 following the pandemic, were not intended to be on the 2021 calendar. Due to the continuation of the pandemic, the PDC confirmed that the first nine rounds would be held over two weeks at Arena MK, Milton Keynes. On 22 March 2021, it was confirmed that all the remaining dates, including the playoffs, would also be played in Milton Keynes.

The first five nights took place from Monday 5 April to Friday 9 April, with the next four nights, including Judgement Night (where the bottom two players are eliminated), taking place from Monday 19 April to Thursday 22 April. The second half will again be in two parts with the first part taking place between Wednesday 5 May to Friday 7 May, and the second part to take place from Monday 24 May to Thursday 27 May, with the playoffs taking place on Friday 28 May.

== Prize money ==
The prize money for the 2021 tournament was increased from £825,000 to £855,000, due to the additional player compared to 2020.

Stage	Prize money
Winner	£250,000
Runner-up	£120,000
Semi-finalists (x2)	£80,000
5th place	£70,000
6th place	£60,000
7th place	£55,000
8th place	£50,000
9th place	£35,000
10th place	£30,000
League Winner Bonus	£25,000
Total	£855,000

== Players ==
Nine of the ten players in this year's tournament were announced following the 2021 PDC World Darts Championship on 3 January. The top four on the PDC Order of Merit are joined by six wildcards. The tenth was announced following the 2021 Masters, with the final of that event serving effectively as a play-off between Mervyn King and Jonny Clayton, with the winner qualifying.

Gerwyn Price, the world number one and reigning world champion, tested positive for COVID-19 before the start of the tournament and had to withdraw. James Wade, the highest-ranked player not in the tournament, was brought in as a replacement.

Player	Appearance in Premier League	Consecutive Streak	Order of Merit Rank on 3/1/21	Previous best performance	Qualification
~~Gerwyn Price~~	~~4th~~	~~4~~	1	5th (2019, 2020)	PDC Order of Merit
Michael van Gerwen	9th	9	2	Winner (2013, 2016, 2017, 2018, 2019)	PDC Order of Merit
Peter Wright	8th	8	3	Runner-up (2017)	PDC Order of Merit
Rob Cross	4th	4	4	Runner-up (2019)	PDC Order of Merit
Nathan Aspinall	2nd	2	5	Runner-up (2020)	Wildcard
Gary Anderson	10th	2 (Note: Anderson qualified for the 2019 Premier League Darts, but withdrew following an injury.)	8	Winner (2011, 2015)	Wildcard
Dimitri Van den Bergh	1st	1	10	Debut	Wildcard
Glen Durrant	2nd	2	13	Winner (2020)	Wildcard
José de Sousa	1st	1	15	Debut	Wildcard
Jonny Clayton	1st	1	18	Debut	Wildcard
James Wade	11th	1	7	Winner (2009)	Replacement

== League stage ==
=== 5 April – Night 1 (Phase 1) ===
	Score	
Nathan Aspinall 97.62	7 – 3	Glen Durrant 87.99
Rob Cross 96.53	6 – 6	José de Sousa 91.66
Peter Wright 101.20	6 – 6	Jonny Clayton 105.56
James Wade 98.14	6 – 6	Gary Anderson 98.13
Michael van Gerwen 100.16	6 – 6	Dimitri Van den Bergh 99.52
Night's Average: 97.69
Highest Checkout: Dimitri Van den Bergh 164
Most 180s: Rob Cross and James Wade 6
Night's 180s: 30

=== 6 April – Night 2 (Phase 1) ===
	Score	
Gary Anderson 99.75	7 – 5	José de Sousa 97.08
Jonny Clayton 98.61	7 – 3	Glen Durrant 88.81
Dimitri Van den Bergh 103.70	7 – 5	Nathan Aspinall 98.32
Michael van Gerwen 92.16	7 – 2	Peter Wright 88.41
James Wade 88.78	3 – 7	Rob Cross 94.34
Night's Average: 95.26
Highest Checkout: Gary Anderson 145
Most 180s: Dimitri Van den Bergh 7
Night's 180s: 32

=== 7 April – Night 3 (Phase 1) ===
	Score	
Rob Cross 97.87	3 – 7	Michael van Gerwen 107.58
Glen Durrant 84.42	0 – 7	Dimitri Van den Bergh 93.94
Peter Wright 100.03	7 – 4	Gary Anderson 98.85
Nathan Aspinall 96.50	7 – 4	James Wade 92.50
José de Sousa 108.48	3 – 7	Jonny Clayton 105.26
Night's Average: 98.62
Highest Checkout: Jonny Clayton 141
Most 180s: Gary Anderson 6
Night's 180s: 29
Nine-dart finish: Jonny Clayton

=== 8 April – Night 4 (Phase 1) ===
	Score	
Dimitri Van den Bergh 101.02	6 – 6	Peter Wright 97.46
Jonny Clayton 95.98	3 – 7	Rob Cross 97.01
José de Sousa 100.95	6 – 6	Nathan Aspinall 95.82
James Wade 95.79	7 – 3	Michael van Gerwen 90.91
Gary Anderson 97.56	7 – 2	Glen Durrant 87.90
Night's Average: 96.28
Highest Checkout: Dimitri Van den Bergh 160
Most 180s: José de Sousa 11
Night's 180s: 36
Nine-dart finish: José de Sousa

=== 9 April – Night 5 (Phase 1) ===
	Score	
Gary Anderson 95.54	4 – 7	Jonny Clayton 99.11
Peter Wright 100.94	7 – 5	Rob Cross 95.43
Michael van Gerwen 99.71	6 – 6	Nathan Aspinall 105.38
James Wade 90.83	7 – 3	Glen Durrant 87.69
Dimitri Van den Bergh 98.48	3 – 7	José de Sousa 104.30
Night's Average: 97.69
Highest Checkout: James Wade 152
Most 180s: Jonny Clayton and José de Sousa 6
Night's 180s: 33

=== 19 April – Night 6 (Phase 1) ===
	Score	
Rob Cross 100.54	5 – 7	Gary Anderson 94.82
José de Sousa 101.91	7 – 5	James Wade 104.01
Jonny Clayton 101.12	3 – 7	Dimitri Van den Bergh 102.32
Glen Durrant 84.94	3 – 7	Michael van Gerwen 87.63
Nathan Aspinall 105.20	7 – 3	Peter Wright 98.27
Night's Average: 97.89
Highest Checkout: Jonny Clayton and Dimitri Van den Bergh 121
Most 180s: Jonny Clayton 6
Night's 180s: 30

=== 20 April – Night 7 (Phase 1) ===
	Score	
Glen Durrant 89.32	4 – 7	José de Sousa 96.09
Rob Cross 99.95	4 – 7	Dimitri Van den Bergh 101.17
Nathan Aspinall 95.44	6 – 6	Jonny Clayton 99.50
Peter Wright 98.36	4 – 7	James Wade 105.76
Michael van Gerwen 98.25	6 – 6	Gary Anderson 97.37
Night's Average: 97.92
Highest Checkout: Nathan Aspinall and Dimitri Van den Bergh 124
Most 180s: José de Sousa , Dimitri Van den Bergh and Rob Cross 5
Night's 180s: 29
Eliminated: Glen Durrant

=== 21 April – Night 8 (Phase 1) ===
	Score	
Rob Cross 90.52	5 – 7	Nathan Aspinall 94.58
Gary Anderson 91.16	5 – 7	Dimitri Van den Bergh 87.28
Michael van Gerwen 104.72	7 – 4	José de Sousa 98.69
James Wade 105.29	7 – 2	Jonny Clayton 103.23
Peter Wright 94.75	7 – 1	Glen Durrant 79.54
Night's Average: 94.51
Highest Checkout: Peter Wright 156
Most 180s: José de Sousa and Michael van Gerwen 7
Night's 180s: 35
Eliminated: Rob Cross

=== 22 April – Night 9 (Phase 1) ===
	Score	
Glen Durrant 85.19	5 – 7	Rob Cross 91.36
Jonny Clayton 100.25	7 – 3	Michael van Gerwen 91.01
Nathan Aspinall 102.45	7 – 2	Gary Anderson 88.35
José de Sousa 101.23	6 – 6	Peter Wright 97.08
Dimitri Van den Bergh 97.96	6 – 6	James Wade 102.93
Night's Average: 95.58
Highest Checkout: Dimitri Van den Bergh 160
Most 180s: José de Sousa and Peter Wright 7
Night's 180s: 36

=== 5 May – Night 10 (Phase 2) ===
	Score	
Jonny Clayton 105.33	8 – 5	James Wade 92.67
José de Sousa 99.28	8 – 3	Gary Anderson 93.62
Dimitri Van den Bergh 106.78	3 – 8	Michael van Gerwen 109.96
Peter Wright 88.52	5 – 8	Nathan Aspinall 93.81
Night's Average: 98.10
Highest Checkout: Nathan Aspinall 161
Most 180s: Jonny Clayton 6
Night's 180s: 29

=== 6 May – Night 11 (Phase 2) ===
	Score	
Nathan Aspinall 103.33	6 – 8	Dimitri Van den Bergh 102.89
James Wade 97.40	7 – 7	José de Sousa 97.56
Gary Anderson 104.63	8 – 3	Peter Wright 92.70
Michael van Gerwen 95.83	8 – 5	Jonny Clayton 93.68
Night's Average: 98.44
Highest Checkout: Dimitri Van den Bergh 136
Most 180s: José de Sousa 10
Night's 180s: 32

=== 7 May – Night 12 (Phase 2) ===
	Score	
Peter Wright 84.30	1 – 8	José de Sousa 102.90
Michael van Gerwen 107.44	8 – 3	James Wade 110.28
Jonny Clayton 92.87	8 – 6	Nathan Aspinall 91.64
Dimitri Van den Bergh 104.40	4 – 8	Gary Anderson 107.85
Night's Average: 99.52
Highest Checkout: Gary Anderson 146
Most 180s: Gary Anderson 6
Night's 180s: 27

=== 24 May – Night 13 (Phase 2) ===
	Score	
Jonny Clayton 101.24	8 – 1	Gary Anderson 104.48
José de Sousa 100.19	8 – 6	Dimitri Van den Bergh 95.08
Nathan Aspinall 96.90	8 – 3	Michael van Gerwen 96.74
James Wade 96.29	4 – 8	Peter Wright 98.68
Night's Average: 98.39
Highest Checkout: Jonny Clayton 124
Most 180s: Peter Wright 5
Night's 180s: 25

=== 25 May – Night 14 (Phase 2) ===
	Score	
James Wade 101.85	7 – 7	Nathan Aspinall 97.89
Jonny Clayton 91.80	5 – 8	José de Sousa 96.90
Gary Anderson 95.08	4 – 8	Michael van Gerwen 98.02
Peter Wright 102.82	8 – 5	Dimitri Van den Bergh 106.97
Night's Average: 98.78
Highest Checkout: Gary Anderson 138
Most 180s: Dimitri Van den Bergh 8
Night's 180s: 27

=== 26 May – Night 15 (Phase 2) ===
	Score	
Jonny Clayton 95.29	5 – 8	Peter Wright 98.09
James Wade 100.20	7 – 7	Dimitri Van den Bergh 101.08
Gary Anderson 97.65	7 – 7	Nathan Aspinall 94.35
José de Sousa 100.80	6 – 8	Michael van Gerwen 98.62
Night's Average: 98.22
Highest Checkout: Peter Wright 161
Most 180s: José de Sousa 6
Night's 180s: 27

=== 27 May – Night 16 (Phase 2) ===
	Score	
Gary Anderson 100.52	6 – 8	James Wade 99.51
Nathan Aspinall 92.03	3 – 8	José de Sousa 103.25
Peter Wright 94.79	6 – 8	Michael van Gerwen 100.20
Dimitri Van den Bergh 100.55	6 – 8	Jonny Clayton 103.92
Night's Average: 99.40
Highest Checkout: Nathan Aspinall 152
Most 180s: James Wade 7
Night's 180s: 27

== Play-offs – 28 May ==
(England) Arena MK, Milton Keynes

	Score	
Semi-finals (best of 19 legs)
Michael van Gerwen 101.97	8 – 10	Jonny Clayton 103.25
José de Sousa 98.29	10 – 9	Nathan Aspinall 95.93
Final (best of 21 legs)
Jonny Clayton 100.18	11 – 5	José de Sousa 100.52
Night's Total Average: 100.02
Highest Checkout: Michael van Gerwen 140
Most 180s (in one match): José de Sousa 8
Night's 180s: 31

== Table and streaks ==
=== Table ===
After the first nine rounds in phase 1, the bottom two players in the table are eliminated. In phase 2, the eight remaining players play in a single match on each of the seven nights. The top four players then compete in the knockout semi-finals and final on the playoff night.

Two points are awarded for a win and one point for a draw. When players are tied on points, leg difference is used first as a tie-breaker, after that legs won against throw and then tournament average.

Pos	Name	Pld	W	D	L	Pts	LF	LA	LD	LWAT	100+	140+	180s	A	HC	C%
1	Michael van Gerwen	16	10	3	3	23	103	79	+24	36	208	92	39	98.68	148	41.53%
2	José de Sousa	16	8	4	4	20	104	84	+20	39	167	102	81	100.08	149	42.80%
3	Nathan Aspinall	16	7	5	4	19	103	88	+15	40	158	120	59	97.58	161	43.10%
4	Jonny Clayton (C)	16	8	2	6	18	95	88	+7	34	213	129	50	99.64	151	38.46%
5	Dimitri Van den Bergh	16	6	4	6	16	95	95	0	34	158	122	72	100.2	164	41.48%
6	James Wade	16	5	5	6	15	93	96	−3	31	241	129	44	98.89	152	48.95%
7	Peter Wright	16	6	3	7	15	87	95	−8	31	196	124	47	96.03	156	42.03%
8	Gary Anderson	16	5	3	8	13	85	98	−13	23	185	110	58	97.84	156	38.29%
9	Rob Cross	9	3	1	5	7	49	52	−3	17	209	90	29	95.78	118	40.00%
10	Glen Durrant	9	0	0	9	0	24	63	−39	7	160	52	6	86.36	121	37.50%

Updated to match(es) played on 25 May 2021. Source: Match reports from the results section
(C) Champion

=== Streaks ===
Player	Phase 1, Nights 1 to 9									Phase 2, Nights 10 to 16							Play-offs	
Player	1	2	3	4	5	6	7	8	9	10	11	12	13	14	15	16	SF	F
Michael van Gerwen	D	W	W	L	D	W	D	W	L	W	W	W	L	W	W	W	L	—N/a
José de Sousa	D	L	L	D	W	W	W	L	D	W	D	W	W	W	L	W	W	L
Nathan Aspinall	W	L	W	D	D	W	D	W	W	W	L	L	W	D	D	L	L	—
Jonny Clayton	D	W	W	L	W	L	D	L	W	W	L	W	W	L	L	W	W	W
Dimitri Van den Bergh	D	W	W	D	L	W	W	W	D	L	W	L	L	L	D	L	—	
James Wade	D	L	L	W	W	L	W	W	D	L	D	L	L	D	D	W	—	
Peter Wright	D	L	W	D	W	L	L	W	D	L	L	L	W	W	W	L	—	
Gary Anderson	D	W	L	W	L	W	D	L	L	L	W	W	L	L	D	L	—	
Rob Cross	D	W	L	W	L	L	L	L	W	Eliminated							—	
Glen Durrant	L	L	L	L	L	L	L	L	L	Eliminated							—	

Legend:	W	Win	D	Draw	L	Loss	—N/a	Eliminated

=== Positions by Week ===
Player	Phase 1, Nights 1 to 9									Phase 2, Nights 10 to 16						
Player	1	2	3	4	5	6	7	8	9	10	11	12	13	14	15	16
Michael van Gerwen	4	1	2	3	4	3	3	2	3	2	2	1	2	1	1	1
José de Sousa	9	7	8	9	9	6	5	6	6	5	4	4	3	3	3	2
Nathan Aspinall	1	6	4	2	3	2	2	3	1	1	1	2	1	2	2	3
Jonny Clayton	2	2	3	4	1	4	4	8	5	4	5	5	4	4	4	4
Dimitri Van den Bergh	5	4	1	1	2	1	1	1	2	3	3	3	5	5	5	5
James Wade	6	8	9	8	7	9	7	4	4	6	6	7	7	7	7	6
Peter Wright	3	9	7	7	5	7	8	7	7	7	8	8	8	6	6	7
Gary Anderson	7	5	6	6	8	5	6	5	8	8	7	6	6	8	8	8
Rob Cross	8	3	5	5	6	8	9	9	9	Eliminated						
Glen Durrant	10	10	10	10	10	10	10	10	10	Eliminated						
