= Bradley Brooks =

English darts player (born 2000)

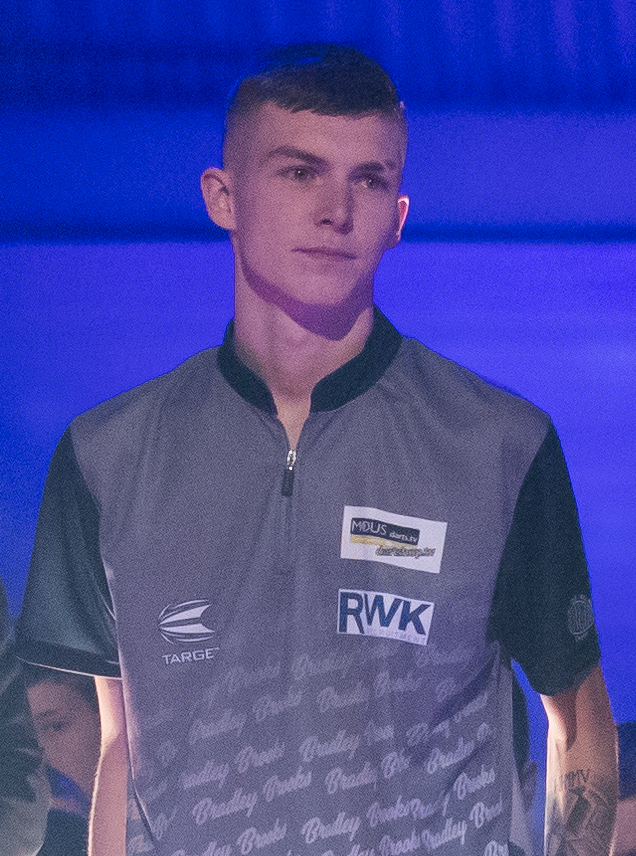
- Brooks at the 2019 European Darts Matchplay

Personal information
- Nickname: "Bam Bam"
- Born: 20 February 2000 (age 26) Blackburn, Lancashire, England

Sport
- Sport: Darts
- Playing since: 2016
- Darts: 23g Shot! Signature
- Laterality: Right-handed
- Walk-on music: Life is a Highway by Rascal Flatts

Organisation (see split in darts)
- PDC: 2016–present (Tour Card 2018–2023, 2025–)
- Current world ranking: (PDC) 59 ▲1 (5 November 2026)

PDC premier events – best performances
- World Championship: Last 96: 2021, 2022
- UK Open: Last 64: 2020
- Grand Slam: Last 16: 2021
- PC Finals: Last 32: 2025
- Masters: Last 32: 2025

Other tournament wins
- Years
Players Championships
2025 PC21
Youth Events
JDC European Open	2017
PDC World Youth Championship	2020
PDC Development Tour	2021 (x3), 2022, 2023

Bradley Brooks (born 20 February 2000) is an English professional darts player who competes in Professional Darts Corporation (PDC) events. He won his first PDC ranking title at Players Championship 21 on the 2025 PDC Pro Tour.

In his youth career, Brooks won the 2020 PDC World Youth Championship and five PDC Development Tours.

== Career ==
In 2017, Brooks won the Junior Darts Corporation (JDC) European Open title, defeating Jarred Cole 6–5 in the final.

Brooks entered PDC UK Q-School in 2018, winning a two-year PDC Tour Card on the fourth and final day by defeating John Goldie 5–1 in the final round. His first significant run in the PDC came in late June 2018, when he made the quarter-finals of Players Championship 16 in Barnsley, only to be knocked out by eventual winner Ian White.

After losing his two-year Tour Card at the end of 2019, he won it straight back on 17 January 2020 by beating Damon Heta 5–3 in the Day 2 final at 2020 Q-School. Brooks reached the final of the 2020 PDC World Youth Championship; where took on Joe Davis on 29 November 2020, and won the match in a last-leg decider, qualifying him for the 2021 PDC World Darts Championship. In his debut he faced Dirk van Duijvenbode and led 2–0 in sets, but eventually lost 3–2 and exited in the first round.

As the reigning World Youth Champion, he earned a spot at the 2021 Grand Slam of Darts. In Group B he faced Jonny Clayton, Mervyn King and Rusty-Jake Rodriguez. Brooks won his first match against King 5–1 but lost to Clayton. After winning 5–3 against Rodriguez in the last match, he secured second place in the group and qualified for the second round. There, he faced Gerwyn Price, the world number one at the time. Price won the close contest 10–8 and eliminated Brooks.

Brooks qualified for the 2022 PDC World Darts Championship by topping the PDC UK Development Tour ranking. He drew William Borland in the first round. The match went to the a deciding fifth set, where Borland hit a nine-dart finish in the deciding leg and eliminated Brooks 3–2.

After losing his Tour Card at the end of 2023, he regained it at 2025 Q-School, finishing first in the UK Q-School Order of Merit with a total of 16 points, a Q-School record. In July 2025, Brooks won his first title on the senior PDC tour by defeating Gerwyn Price in the final of Players Championship 21.

== Personal life ==
Brooks is a Blackburn Rovers supporter, and played football in his youth before breaking his foot. He studied sports and coaching management at Blackburn College.

== World Championship results ==
=== PDC ===
- 2021: First round (lost to Dirk van Duijvenbode 2–3)
- 2022: First round (lost to William Borland 2–3)
- 2026: First round (lost to Joe Cullen 0–3)

== Performance timeline ==
Tournament	2018	2019	2020	2021	2022	2023	2024	2025	2026
PDC Ranked televised events
World Championship	Did not qualify			1R	1R	Did not qualify			1R
World Masters	Did not qualify							1R	Prel.
UK Open	2R	2R	4R	2R	1R	2R	2R	2R	2R
Grand Slam	Did not qualify			2R	Did not qualify				RR
Players Championship Finals	Did not qualify							2R	
PDC Non-ranked televised events
World Youth Championship	RR	RR	W	2R	2R	2R	3R	DNP	
Career statistics
Season-end ranking	117	94	104	70	134	92	235	71	

=== PDC European Tour ===
Season	1	2	3	4	5	6	7	8	9	10	11	12	13	14	15
2019	Did not qualify										EDM; 2R	IDO; DNQ	GDT; DNQ		
2021	HDT; 2R	GDT; DNQ													
2022	Did not qualify								EDM; 1R	HDT; DNQ	GDO; 2R	BDO; 2R	GDT; DNQ		
2023	BSD; 2R	EDO; 1R	IDO; DNQ	GDG; DNQ	ADO; 1R	DDC; DNQ	BDO; 2R	CDO; 1R	Did not qualify						
2025	Did not qualify					EDG; 1R	DDC; DNQ	EDO; 2R	Did not qualify						
2026	Did not qualify						IDO; 2R	DNQ		EDO; 2R	DNQ		FDT; 2R	SDT; QF	DDC

=== PDC Players Championships ===
Season	1	2	3	4	5	6	7	8	9	10	11	12	13	14	15	16	17	18	19	20	21	22	23	24	25	26	27	28	29	30	31	32	33	34
2018	BAR; 1R	BAR; 2R	BAR; 1R	BAR; 3R	MIL; 1R	MIL; 2R	BAR; 1R	BAR; 1R	WIG; 1R	WIG; 1R	MIL; 2R	MIL; 1R	WIG; 1R	WIG; 2R	BAR; 1R	BAR; QF	BAR; 2R	BAR; 2R	DUB; 1R	DUB; 1R	BAR; 2R	BAR; 2R												
2019	WIG; 1R	WIG; 1R	WIG; 1R	WIG; QF	BAR; 2R	BAR; 1R	WIG; 1R	WIG; 3R	BAR; 2R	BAR; 1R	BAR; 2R	BAR; 1R	BAR; 1R	BAR; 2R	BAR; 2R	BAR; 3R	WIG; 2R	WIG; 1R	BAR; 2R	BAR; 3R	HIL; 2R	HIL; 1R	BAR; 2R	BAR; 1R	BAR; 1R	BAR; 1R	DUB; 2R	DUB; 1R	BAR; 2R	BAR; 1R				
2020	BAR; 1R	BAR; 1R	WIG; 1R	WIG; 1R	WIG; 1R	WIG; 1R	BAR; 1R	BAR; 1R	MIL; 1R	MIL; 3R	MIL; 2R	MIL; 1R	MIL; 2R	NIE; 1R	NIE; 1R	NIE; 1R	NIE; 2R	NIE; 4R	COV; 1R	COV; 3R	COV; 1R	COV; 2R	COV; 2R											
2021	BOL; 1R	BOL; 1R	BOL; 1R	BOL; 2R	MIL; 1R	MIL; 2R	MIL; 1R	MIL; 2R	NIE; 1R	NIE; 1R	NIE; 1R	NIE; 2R	MIL; 4R	MIL; 1R	MIL; 3R	MIL; 3R	COV; 1R	COV; 1R	COV; 1R	COV; 1R	BAR; 2R	BAR; 1R	BAR; 1R	BAR; 2R	BAR; 1R	BAR; 1R	BAR; 2R	BAR; 4R	BAR; 1R	BAR; DNP				
2022	BAR; 1R	BAR; 1R	WIG; 1R	WIG; 2R	BAR; 1R	BAR; 1R	NIE; 1R	NIE; 2R	BAR; 1R	BAR; 2R	BAR; DNP	BAR; 2R	BAR; 1R	WIG; 2R	WIG; 1R	NIE; 1R	NIE; 1R	BAR; 1R	BAR; 1R	BAR; 1R	BAR; 1R	BAR; 1R	BAR; 3R	BAR; 3R	BAR; 1R	BAR; 1R	BAR; 1R	BAR; 1R	BAR; 1R	BAR; 1R				
2023	BAR; 4R	BAR; 2R	BAR; 2R	BAR; 1R	BAR; 3R	BAR; 1R	HIL; SF	HIL; 1R	WIG; 1R	WIG; 3R	LEI; 2R	LEI; 1R	HIL; 1R	HIL; 4R	LEI; 1R	LEI; 1R	HIL; 1R	HIL; 1R	BAR; 1R	BAR; 1R	BAR; 1R	BAR; 2R	BAR; 1R	BAR; 3R	BAR; 1R	BAR; 1R	BAR; 1R	BAR; 1R	BAR; 1R	BAR; 1R				
2024 (Note: Not a Tour card holder)	Did not participate																																	
2025	WIG; 1R	WIG; 2R	ROS; 1R	ROS; 2R	LEI; 2R	LEI; 1R	HIL; 1R	HIL; 2R	LEI; 1R	LEI; 2R	LEI; 3R	LEI; 1R	ROS; 3R	ROS; 1R	HIL; 1R	HIL; 1R	LEI; 1R	LEI; 1R	LEI; QF	LEI; 3R	LEI; W	HIL; 2R	HIL; SF	MIL; 1R	MIL; 2R	HIL; QF	HIL; 2R	LEI; 2R	LEI; 2R	LEI; QF	WIG; 1R	WIG; 3R	WIG; 2R	WIG; 1R
2026	HIL; 1R	HIL; 2R	WIG; 4R	WIG; 1R	LEI; 1R	LEI; 1R	LEI; 1R	LEI; 1R	WIG; 2R	WIG; 1R	MIL; 1R	MIL; 2R	DNP		LEI; 1R	LEI; 1R	LEI; 1R	LEI; 1R	MIL; 4R	MIL; 1R	WIG; 1R	WIG; 2R	LEI; 2R	LEI; 4R	HIL; 4R	HIL; 4R	LEI; 4R	LEI; 3R	ROS; 2R	ROS; 1R	ROS; 3R	ROS; 4R	LEI; 3R	LEI; 2R

Performance Table Legend
W	Won the tournament	F	Finalist	SF	Semifinalist	QF	Quarterfinalist	#R; RR; Prel.	Lost in # round Round-robin; Preliminary round	DQ	Disqualified
DNQ	Did not qualify	DNP	Did not participate	WD	Withdrew	NH	Tournament not held	#R; RR; Prel.	Lost in # round Round-robin; Preliminary round	NYF	Not yet founded
