= 2022 PDC World Darts Championship =

29th PDC World Darts Championship

2021/22 William Hill World Darts Championship

Tournament information
- Dates: 15 December 2021 – 3 January 2022
- Venue: Alexandra Palace
- Location: London, England
- Organisation(s): Professional Darts Corporation (PDC)
- Format: Sets; Final – first to 7 sets
- Prize fund: £2,500,000
- Winner's share: £500,000
- Nine-dart finish: William Borland; Darius Labanauskas; Gerwyn Price
- High checkout: 170; William O'Connor; Raymond van Barneveld; Rob Cross; Gary Anderson

Champion(s)
- Peter Wright (SCO)

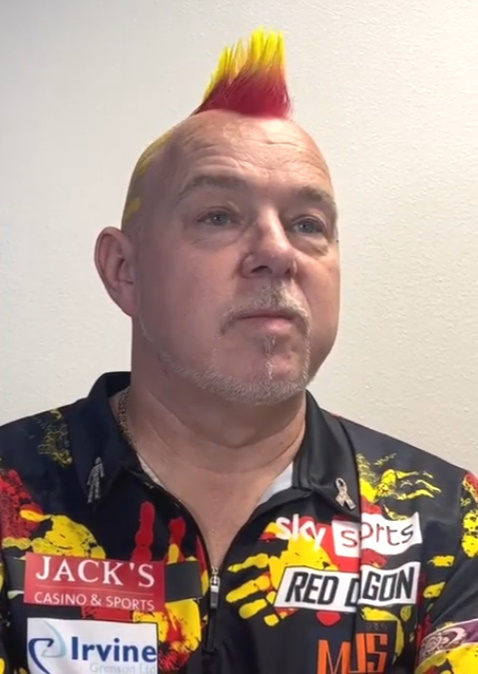
Peter Wright won the PDC World Darts Championship for the second time

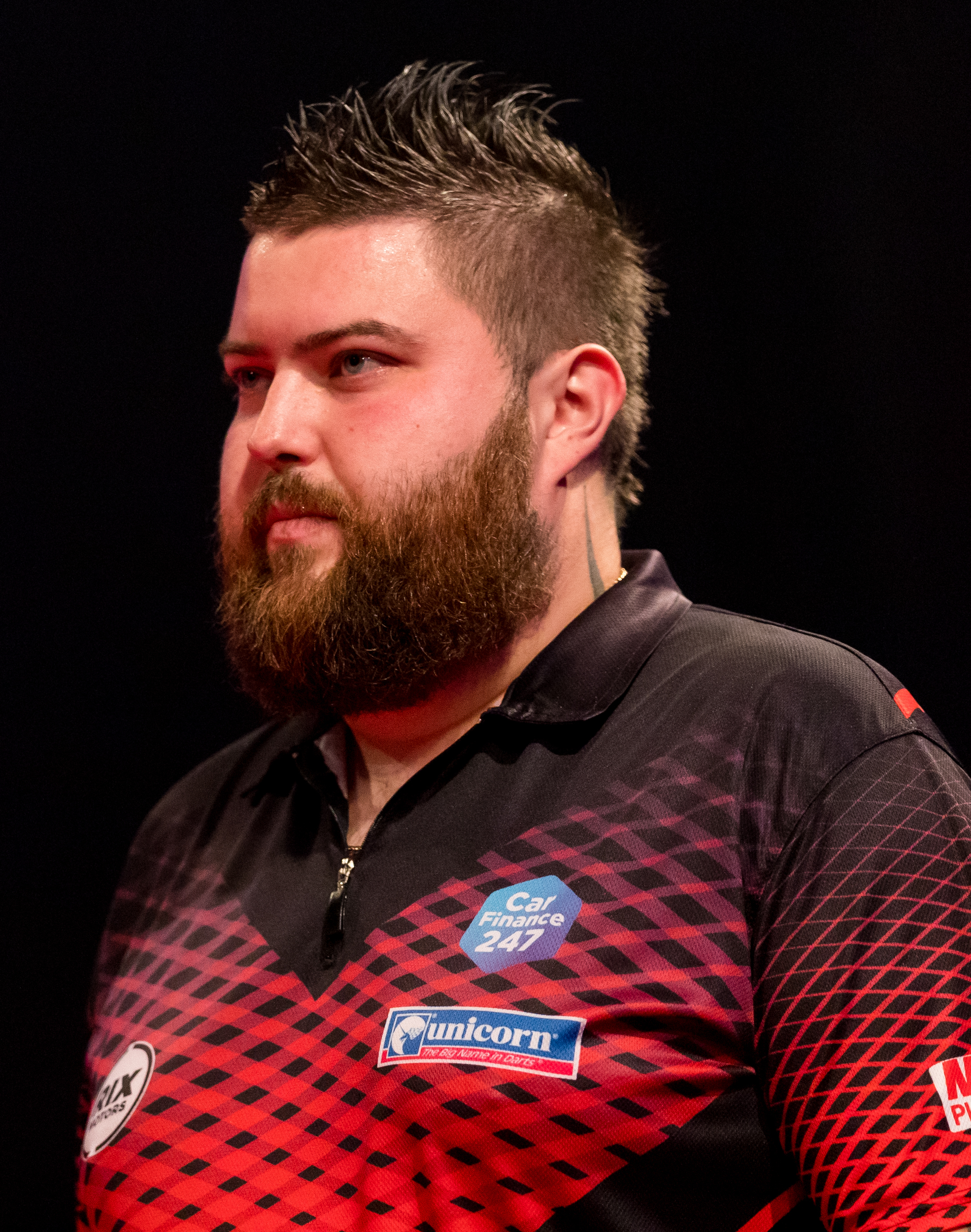
Michael Smith was defeated in the final for the second time in his career

The 2022 PDC World Darts Championship (known for sponsorship reasons as the 2021/22 William Hill World Darts Championship) was the twenty-ninth World Championship organised by the Professional Darts Corporation since it separated from the now-defunct British Darts Organisation. It took place at the Alexandra Palace in London from 15 December 2021 to 3 January 2022.

Gerwyn Price was the defending champion, after he defeated Gary Anderson 7–3 to claim his first World Championship in 2021. However, he lost 5–4 to Michael Smith in the quarter-finals. For the first time since 2006, no players from outside the United Kingdom reached the quarter-final stage.

Three nine-dart finishes were made in the tournament, the most in a single PDC World Championship. William Borland became the first ever player in a televised tournament to hit a nine-dart finish in a deciding leg, against Bradley Brooks in the first round. Darius Labanauskas then hit the second of the tournament the following day, in his first-round match against Mike De Decker. Price hit his first televised nine-dart finish, and the third of the tournament, against Michael Smith in the quarter-finals.

Three players were forced to withdraw in the third round due to testing positive for COVID-19; on 27 December, Vincent van der Voort was forced to withdraw from the tournament ahead of his match against James Wade, three-time World Champion Michael van Gerwen withdrew the following day from his match against Chris Dobey, and Dave Chisnall withdrew on 29 December before his match against Luke Humphries.

Peter Wright won the World Championship for the second time in his career, defeating Michael Smith 7–5 in the final.

The event would be the final event of William Hill's sponsorship deal with the PDC, as the organisation had announced on 18 July 2021 that it had reached a multi-year, multi-tournament sponsorship deal with British car sales company Cazoo for all of its events from 2022 and onwards, including the World Championship.

== Format ==
All matches were played as single in, double out; requiring the players to score 501 points to win a leg, finishing on either a double or the bullseye. Matches were played to set format, with each set being the best of five legs (first to three). After a one-year break, the tie-break rule came back into force. For all rounds except the first, the final set had to be won by two clear legs, unless the set score went to 5–5, in which case a sudden-death leg was played. This year, there was no throw for the bull in any sudden-death legs.

The matches got longer as the tournament progressed:

| Round | Best of (sets) | First to (sets) |
|---|---|---|
| First | 5 | 3 |
| Second | 5 | 3 |
| Third | 7 | 4 |
| Fourth | 7 | 4 |
| Quarter-finals | 9 | 5 |
| Semi-finals | 11 | 6 |
| Final | 13 | 7 |

== Prize money ==
The prize money for the tournament was £2,500,000 in total – the same as the previous year. The winner's share was £500,000.

| Position (no. of players) | | Prize money (Total: £2,500,000) |
|---|---|---|
| Winner | (1) | £500,000 |
| Runner-up | (1) | £200,000 |
| Semi-finalists | (2) | £100,000 |
| Quarter-finalists | (4) | £50,000 |
| Fourth round losers | (8) | £35,000 |
| Third round losers | (16) | £25,000 |
| Second round losers | (32) | £15,000 |
| First round losers | (32) | £7,500 |

== Qualification ==
=== Qualifiers ===
The top 32 from the PDC Order of Merit began the competition in the second round. The 32 highest ranked players on the PDC Pro Tour Order of Merit (not already qualified) and 32 qualifiers from around the world began in the first round.

This was the first time since the 2014 PDC World Darts Championship that Michael van Gerwen would not be seeded for the tournament as the World number 1, with reigning champion Gerwyn Price taking his spot.

Order of Merit
Second round (seeded)

1. (Wales) Gerwyn Price (quarter-finals)
2. (Scotland) Peter Wright (champion)
3. (Netherlands) Michael van Gerwen (third round, COVID-19)
4. (England) James Wade (semi-finals)
5. (Belgium) Dimitri Van den Bergh (second round)
6. (Scotland) Gary Anderson (semi-finals)
7. (Portugal) José de Sousa (third round)
8. (Wales) Jonny Clayton (fourth round)
9. (England) Michael Smith (runner-up)
10. (England) Nathan Aspinall (third round)
11. (England) Rob Cross (fourth round)
12. (Poland) Krzysztof Ratajski (second round)
13. (England) Joe Cullen (third round)
14. (England) Dave Chisnall (third round, COVID-19)
15. (England) Ryan Searle (fourth round)
16. (England) Stephen Bunting (second round)
17. (Netherlands) Dirk van Duijvenbode (fourth round)
18. (Netherlands) Danny Noppert (third round)
19. (England) Luke Humphries (quarter-finals)
20. (Australia) Simon Whitlock (second round)
21. (England) Mervyn King (quarter-finals)
22. (Northern Ireland) Daryl Gurney (third round)
23. (Northern Ireland) Brendan Dolan (second round)
24. (England) Glen Durrant (second round)
25. (Germany) Gabriel Clemens (third round)
26. (Austria) Mensur Suljović (second round)
27. (England) Ian White (third round)
28. (South Africa) Devon Petersen (second round)
29. (Netherlands) Vincent van der Voort (third round, COVID-19)
30. (England) Chris Dobey (fourth round)
31. (Australia) Damon Heta (third round)
32. (Belgium) Kim Huybrechts (third round)

Pro Tour Order of Merit
First round

1. (England) Callan Rydz (quarter-finals)
2. (England) Ross Smith (third round)
3. (Netherlands) Raymond van Barneveld (second round)
4. (England) Ryan Joyce (second round)
5. (England) Adrian Lewis (second round)
6. (England) Scott Mitchell (first round)
7. (Scotland) Alan Soutar (fourth round)
8. (Netherlands) Martijn Kleermaker (fourth round)
9. (Lithuania) Darius Labanauskas (first round)
10. (England) Ritchie Edhouse (second round)
11. (England) Luke Woodhouse (second round)
12. (England) Jamie Hughes (first round)
13. (Netherlands) Maik Kuivenhoven (second round)
14. (Austria) Rowby-John Rodriguez (second round)
15. (England) Steve Beaton (second round)
16. (Republic of Ireland) William O'Connor (third round)
17. (England) Ricky Evans (second round)
18. (Republic of Ireland) Keane Barry (second round)
19. (England) Jason Heaver (second round)
20. (Scotland) William Borland (second round)
21. (Netherlands) Ron Meulenkamp (second round)
22. (Republic of Ireland) Steve Lennon (third round)
23. (Austria) Rusty-Jake Rodriguez (second round)
24. (Wales) Lewy Williams (second round)
25. (Germany) Florian Hempel (third round)
26. (Netherlands) Jermaine Wattimena (first round)
27. (England) Joe Murnan (second round)
28. (England) Ryan Meikle (second round)
29. (England) Chas Barstow (second round)
30. (England) Ted Evetts (first round)
31. (England) Adam Hunt (second round)
32. (England) Jason Lowe (second round)

International Qualifiers
First round

- (England) Lisa Ashton – Women's Series OoM runner-up (first round)
- (Czech Republic) Roman Benecký – East Europe Qualifier (first round)
- (England) Bradley Brooks – PDC UK Development Tour (first round)
- (Canada) Matt Campbell – PDC Europe Challenge Tour (first round)
- Lourence Ilagan – PDC Asia Philippines Qualifier (first round)
- (Wales) Nick Kenny – PDPA Qualifier (first round)
- (Russia) Boris Koltsov – EADC Qualifier (second round)
- (Croatia) Boris Krčmar – PDPA Qualifier (first round)
- (India) Nitin Kumar – Indian Qualifier (first round)
- Royden Lam – PDC Asia Hong Kong Qualifier (first round)
- (Netherlands) Chris Landman – West Europe Qualifier (second round)
- (Sweden) Daniel Larsson – PDCNB Order of Merit (first round)
- (United States) Danny Lauby – CDC USA Tour (first round)
- Paul Lim – PDC Asia Singapore Qualifier (first round)
- ~~(South Africa) Charles Losper – African Qualifier~~ (withdrew) (Note: Charles Losper withdrew after the draw due to visa issues. Mike De Decker, the highest ranked runner-up from the PDPA Qualifier, replaced him.)
- (Greece) John Michael – South-East Europe Qualifier (first round)
- John Norman Jnr – CDC Canada Tour (first round)
- (Brazil) Diogo Portela – Central/South America Qualifier (first round)
- (Latvia) Madars Razma – PDCNB Order of Merit (first round)
- (New Zealand) Ben Robb – DPNZ Qualifier (first round)
- ~~(Spain) Juan Rodriguez – South-West Europe Qualifier~~ (COVID-19) (Note: Juan Rodriguez withdrew after the draw due to a positive COVID-19 test. Gordon Mathers, the second highest ranked runner-up from the PDPA Qualifier, replaced him.)
- (Germany) Martin Schindler – PDC Europe Super League (first round)
- (Germany) Fabian Schmutzler – PDC Europe Development Tour (first round)
- (England) Fallon Sherrock – Women's Series OoM leader (first round)
- Toyokazu Shibata – PDC Asia Japan Qualifier (first round)
- (Canada) Jeff Smith – CDC Continental Cup (first round)
- (Australia) Ky Smith – Oceanic Masters Winner (first round)
- (Australia) Raymond Smith – DPA Qualifier (fourth round)
- ~~Lihao Wen – PDC China Champion~~ (withdrew) (Note: Lihao Wen withdrew after the draw due to visa issues. Peter Hudson, the third highest ranked runner-up from the PDPA Qualifier, replaced him.)
- (Wales) Jim Williams – PDC UK Challenge Tour (second round)
- (England) James Wilson – PDPA Qualifier (first round)
- (Japan) Yuki Yamada – PDJ Qualifier (first round)
- (Belgium) Mike De Decker – Replacement (second round)
- (Australia) Gordon Mathers – Replacement (first round)
- (England) Peter Hudson – Replacement (first round)

==== Seeds ====
The reigning 2021 PDC World Champion and 2021 Grand Slam champion Gerwyn Price, was top of the two-year PDC Order of Merit and number one seed going into the tournament. 2020 winner Peter Wright, the winner of the 2021 World Matchplay and part of the victorious Scotland team at the 2021 PDC World Cup of Darts, was second seed and Michael van Gerwen, the three-time World Champion from 2014, 2017 and 2019, was third seed. As well as Price, Wright and Van Gerwen, two other previous PDC world champions qualified as seeds; 2015 and 2016 World Champion and 2021 runner-up Gary Anderson was 6th seeded, and 2018 World Champion and 2021 European Champion Rob Cross was the 11th seed. Two former champions of the BDO World Darts Championship qualified as seeds; three-time BDO champion Glen Durrant was the 24th seed with 2014 BDO champion Stephen Bunting in 16th.

The top seeds behind Price, Wright and Van Gerwen were 2021 UK Open champion James Wade, 2020 World Matchplay winner Dimitri Van den Bergh, Anderson, 2020 Grand Slam of Darts winner José de Sousa, and 2021 Masters, Premier League, World Series Finals and World Grand Prix champion Jonny Clayton.

==== Pro Tour qualification ====
Callan Rydz, a two-time event winner on the 2021 PDC Pro Tour, was the highest-ranked non-seed on the 2021 PDC Pro Tour Order of Merit. 2007 World Champion Raymond van Barneveld returned as a Pro Tour qualifier, having announced his retirement following a first-round exit in 2020, and then reversed his decision after a year out. Van Barneveld was one of two former PDC World Champions to qualify via the Pro Tour, with 2011 and 2012 winner Adrian Lewis also qualifying. The highest-ranked debutant via the Pro Tour was Scott Mitchell, the 2015 BDO World Champion. As well as Mitchell and four-time BDO World Champion Van Barneveld, 1996 BDO champion Steve Beaton also qualified via the Pro Tour, making a record 31st consecutive World Championship appearance.

As well as Mitchell, other players qualifying for their PDC World Championship debuts were Alan Soutar, Jason Heaver, William Borland, Rusty-Jake Rodriguez, Lewy Williams, Florian Hempel and Chas Barstow. Martijn Kleermaker also appeared for the first time, having withdrawn from the 2021 tournament following a positive COVID-19 test. Other players qualifying via the Pro Tour included the 2021 World Youth Champion Ted Evetts and 2021 PDC World Cup of Darts finalist Rowby-John Rodriguez, who along with his brother Rusty-Jake became the fourth pair of siblings to compete in the same World Championship.

==== Unranked qualifiers ====
The final group of 32 qualifiers were determined by a series of international qualifiers and secondary tours. The PDC Development and Challenge Tours were split into UK and EU sections this year, meaning that an extra qualification spot was available via the Challenge Tour. The PDC Asian Tour was not held for a second consecutive year, with one-off qualification tournaments being held to replace it. The two Australian qualification spots were taken by Raymond Smith and Ky Smith, the first father-and-son to play in the same PDC World Darts Championship. Paul Lim qualified via the Singapore qualifier, becoming at age 67 and 326 days the oldest player to compete in the World Championship; while Fabian Schmutzler, who qualified via the Development Tour, was the second-youngest player ever to compete in the World Championship.

Four-time BDO Women's World Champion Lisa Ashton qualified via the PDC Women's Tour, alongside Fallon Sherrock, the 2021 Grand Slam of Darts quarter-finalist and only woman to have previously won a match at the PDC World Darts Championship. The final three places were awarded to the winners of a qualification tournament for PDPA members, with the winners being Nick Kenny, Boris Krčmar and James Wilson.

Three of the international qualifiers withdrew following the draw; Charles Losper and Lihao Wen, due to visa issues, and potential debutant Juan Rodriguez, following a positive test for COVID-19. They were replaced by runners-up from the PDPA qualifier in Order of Merit order, Mike De Decker, Gordon Mathers and Peter Hudson.

Debutants via the international and invitation qualifiers were Roman Benecký, Chris Landman, John Norman Jnr, Fabian Schmutzler, Toyokazu Shibata, Ky Smith and Jim Williams.

== Summary ==
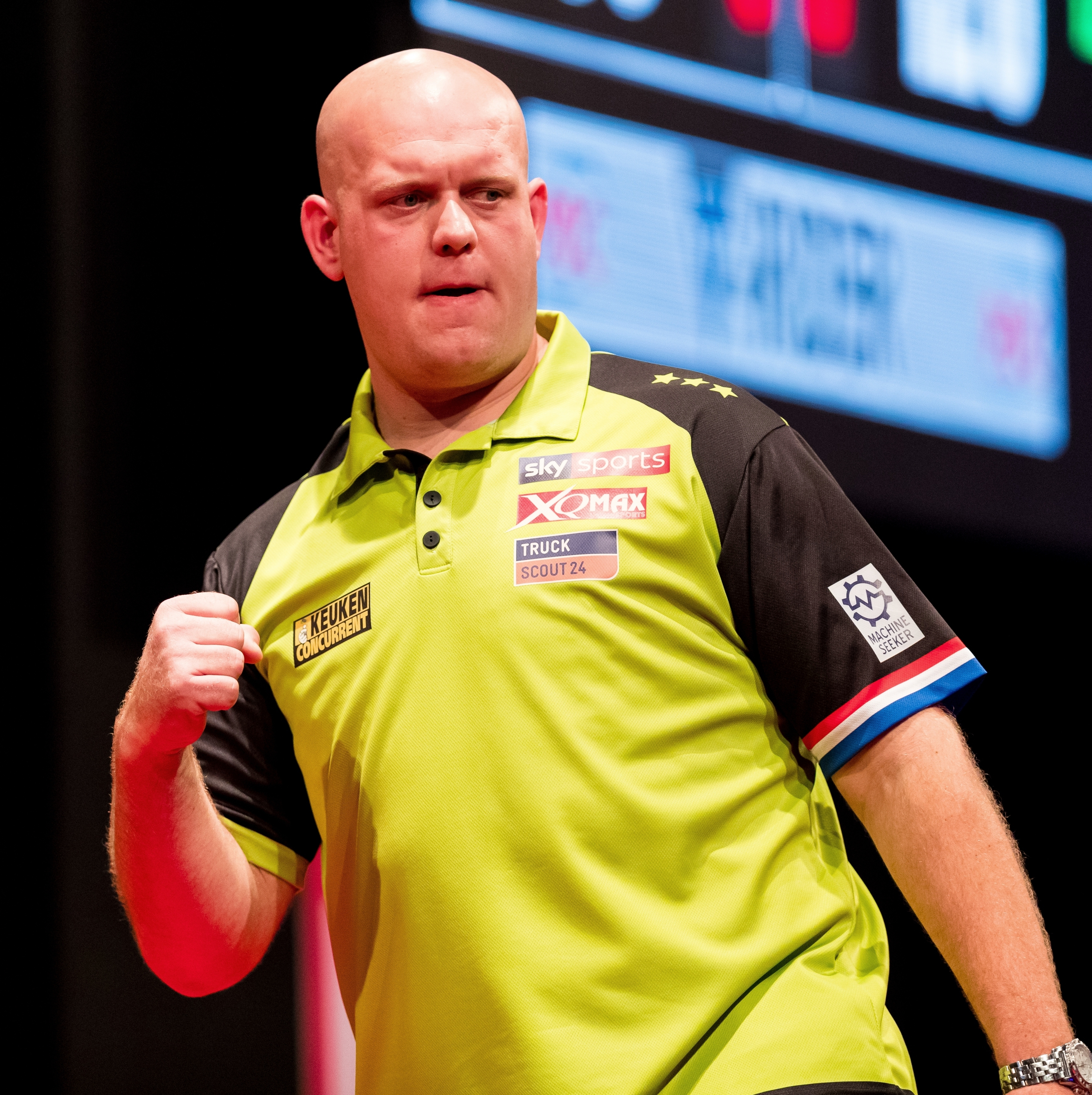
Third seed Michael van Gerwen was forced to withdraw after testing positive for COVID-19. He was critical of the PDC for the lack of COVID checks on supporters in the venue.

=== Opening rounds ===
The first round of the tournament, running from 15 to 21 December, saw the 32 qualifiers from the PDC Pro Tour take on 32 players from international qualifiers. Two players hit nine-dart finishes in consecutive days, William Borland hitting one against Bradley Brooks in the final leg of his debut on 17 December, becoming the first player to hit a nine-darter in a sudden death leg to win a televised match; before Darius Labanauskas hit a second nine-darter in his defeat to Mike De Decker. Another high-profile match saw Fallon Sherrock take on Steve Beaton, with Beaton defeating the "Queen of the Palace" 3–2.

The second round, starting the same day as the first and running through to 23 December, saw the 32 seeds enter the tournament to take on first round winners. Two matches turned out to be between two former World Champions, with Rob Cross defeating Raymond van Barneveld and Gary Anderson eliminating Adrian Lewis in an early-round repeat of the 2011 and 2016 finals. Eight seeds were eliminated in the second round, the highest ranked of these being Dimitri Van den Bergh, the fifth seed, defeated by debutant Florian Hempel.

Prior to the third round, three players had to withdraw after testing positive for COVID-19, those being Vincent van der Voort, Michael van Gerwen and Dave Chisnall, with their scheduled third round opponents receiving byes. After the withdrawal of former champion Van Gerwen, reigning champion Gerwyn Price said that the tournament was devalued, and called for the tournament to be postponed. Van Gerwen himself criticised the PDC for a lack of COVID checks on supporters, calling the tournament a "big corona bomb". Former PDC chairman Barry Hearn responded to these comments made, declaring calls for a postponement "ignorant", and said all fans had been confirmed to be double-vaccinated.

In the third round, running from 27 to 29 December, Price came through a last-leg tie-break against Kim Huybrechts, while Dirk van Duijvenbode fought back from 3–0 down to knock out Ross Smith 4–3. Former champion Gary Anderson did the same against Ian White, but Joe Cullen's attempt at a similar feat against Martijn Kleermaker faltered as he lost the final set. The last remaining international qualifier Raymond Smith ended Florian Hempel's run with a 4–1 win, while former champions Peter Wright and Rob Cross both safely qualified.

The fourth round, from 29 to 30 December, saw Price knock out van Duijvenbode in a match which saw chants of "sheep shagging bastard" directed at Price, which Welsh rugby former international Andy Powell and social media users branded as racist. Michael Smith eliminated Jonny Clayton in a 4–3 thriller. Raymond Smith's run was ended by Mervyn King, with King winning nine of the last ten legs to reverse a 3–1 deficit into a 4–3 victory. There was also 4–3 victories for Luke Humphries over Chris Dobey, both of whom had come through the third round via byes, and for Anderson over Cross in a clash of former World Champions. James Wade, another beneficiary of a bye, defeated Martijn Kleermaker 4–0, while Callan Rydz and Peter Wright defeated Alan Soutar and Ryan Searle respectively, both by a score of 4–1.

=== Final stages ===
The quarter-finals were held on New Year's Day. Wade comfortably beat Mervyn King 5–0 to reach his fourth World Championship semi-final. The match between Anderson and Humphries saw the first four sets being shared between the two players, before Anderson took control and won the last three sets to triumph 5–2, reaching his seventh semi-final (second consecutively), and condemning Humphries to a third quarter-final exit in four years. Rydz held leads of 2–0, 3–1 and 4–3 over Wright, before Wright levelled and took the final set in extra legs to eliminate his unseeded opponent and reach his fourth semi-final. Finally, the match between Smith and Price saw the first eight sets go with throw; with Price both hitting the tournament's third nine-dart finish and missing two darts to break the eighth set and win the match; before Smith broke throw in the final set to reach his second semi-final.

The semi-finals were held on 2 January. In the first game Smith led from the start, winning the first set and then breaking Wade's throw to take the second set. Wade broke back in the third set before Smith restored the two-set advantage by breaking again in the fourth. Smith took sets five and six to go one away, and despite Wade taking the next two sets, he was not able to prevent Smith from triumphing, condemning Wade to a fourth semi-final defeat from four attempts and enabling Smith to reach his second World Championship final. In the second semi-final, Wright took the first three sets – two of them against throw – before Anderson broke back in the fourth set and then held in the fifth to close the gap to one. Wright stopped the comeback by holding throw in the sixth set, and from then on a high-quality match went with throw, with Wright breaking Anderson's record - set in the 2017 final - for most 180s in a World Championship match, with 24, and taking the win 6–4 to reach his third World Championship final.

In the final, held on 3 January, Peter Wright began the game in control of throw and took the first set 3–1, before breaking with a 148 checkout in the second set on his way to another 3–1 win. Smith closed the deficit with a 3–1 win in the third set, including a 167 checkout to break; and took the fourth set 3–2 after Wright missed two darts to break. Wright held the fifth set 3–2, and Smith took the sixth 3–1. The seventh set saw Smith take the lead in sets for the first time, and the first 3–0 win of a set, with Smith breaking the Wright throw twice. Wright however broke back in the eighth set 3–1. Smith took advantage of missed darts from Wright to win the ninth set 3–2 and regain the lead; but after going 2 legs up in the tenth set, he allowed Wright to come back and take the set to level again. Wright took the lead after winning the eleventh set 3–0 to move one away from the title; and took the next two legs in the twelfth set, and after Smith pulled one back, Wright sealed the title with a thirteen-dart hold, hitting double 16 to win his second World Championship.

== Schedule ==
Wednesday, 15 December

| Match # | Round | Player 1 | Score | Player 2 | Set 1 | Set 2 | Set 3 | Set 4 | Set 5 |
|---|---|---|---|---|---|---|---|---|---|
| 01 | 1 | Ritchie Edhouse 84.26 | 3 – 2 | Peter Hudson 82.85 | 3 – 1 | 2 – 3 | 1 – 3 | 3 – 0 | 3 – 0 |
| 02 | 1 | Ricky Evans 96.20 | 3 – 0 | Nitin Kumar 83.80 | 3 – 1 | 3 – 0 | 3 – 1 | —N/a | |
| 03 | 1 | Adrian Lewis 94.42 | 3 – 1 | Matt Campbell 93.57 | 2 – 3 | 3 – 0 | 3 – 2 | 3 – 2 | —N/a |
| 04 | 2 | Gerwyn Price 101.28 | 3 – 1 | Ritchie Edhouse 95.67 | 0 – 3 | 3 – 2 | 3 – 2 | 3 – 0 | —N/a |

Thursday, 16 December

| Match # | Round | Player 1 | Score | Player 2 | Set 1 | Set 2 | Set 3 | Set 4 | Set 5 |
|---|---|---|---|---|---|---|---|---|---|
| 05 | 1 | Steve Lennon 93.22 | 3 – 1 | Madars Razma 94.11 | 3 – 1 | 1 – 3 | 3 – 2 | 3 – 2 | —N/a |
| 06 | 1 | Scott Mitchell 88.02 | 0 – 3 | Chris Landman 88.97 | 0 – 3 | 0 – 3 | 2 – 3 | —N/a | |
| 07 | 1 | Chas Barstow 93.02 | 3 – 1 | John Norman Jnr 86.54 | 3 – 1 | 3 – 0 | 1 – 3 | 3 – 2 | —N/a |
| 08 | 2 | Daryl Gurney 95.90 | 3 – 1 | Ricky Evans 93.11 | 2 – 3 | 3 – 1 | 3 – 1 | 3 – 2 | —N/a |
| 09 | 1 | William O'Connor 96.02 | 3 – 2 | Danny Lauby 93.46 | 3 – 1 | 3 – 1 | 1 – 3 | 2 – 3 | 3 – 2 |
| 10 | 1 | Ryan Meikle 89.30 | 3 – 0 | Fabian Schmutzler 89.14 | 3 – 0 | 3 – 1 | 3 – 2 | —N/a | |
| 11 | 1 | Ron Meulenkamp 87.32 | 3 – 0 | Lisa Ashton 73.99 | 3 – 1 | 3 – 0 | 3 – 1 | —N/a | |
| 12 | 2 | Gary Anderson 93.74 | 3 – 1 | Adrian Lewis 92.07 | 2 – 3 | 3 – 0 | 3 – 1 | 3 – 0 | —N/a |

Friday, 17 December

| Match # | Round | Player 1 | Score | Player 2 | Set 1 | Set 2 | Set 3 | Set 4 | Set 5 |
|---|---|---|---|---|---|---|---|---|---|
| 13 | 1 | Ryan Joyce 93.44 | 3 – 2 | Roman Benecký 86.80 | 3 – 0 | 3 – 1 | 1 – 3 | 1 – 3 | 3 – 2 |
| 14 | 1 | Keane Barry 83.59 | 3 – 2 | Royden Lam 81.61 | 3 – 1 | 3 – 1 | 2 – 3 | 1 – 3 | 3 – 1 |
| 15 | 1 | Jermaine Wattimena 90.84 | 0 – 3 | Boris Koltsov 90.50 | 1 – 3 | 1 – 3 | 2 – 3 | —N/a | |
| 16 | 2 | Krzysztof Ratajski 94.39 | 1 – 3 | Steve Lennon 91.34 | 2 – 3 | 3 – 0 | 0 – 3 | 1 – 3 | —N/a |
| 17 | 1 | Joe Murnan 79.33 | 3 – 2 | Paul Lim 79.35 | 1 – 3 | 3 – 1 | 3 – 2 | 2 – 3 | 3 – 1 |
| 18 | 1 | William Borland 94.81 | 3 – 2 | Bradley Brooks 94.22 | 0 – 3 | 3 – 1 | 3 – 2 | 2 – 3 | 3 – 2 |
| 19 | 1 | Ross Smith 85.15 | 3 – 0 | Jeff Smith 79.79 | 3 – 1 | 3 – 0 | 3 – 2 | —N/a | |
| 20 | 2 | Peter Wright 92.19 | 3 – 0 | Ryan Meikle 79.29 | 3 – 2 | 3 – 1 | 3 – 0 | —N/a | |

Saturday, 18 December

| Match # | Round | Player 1 | Score | Player 2 | Set 1 | Set 2 | Set 3 | Set 4 | Set 5 |
|---|---|---|---|---|---|---|---|---|---|
| 21 | 1 | Jamie Hughes 96.05 | 1 – 3 | Raymond Smith 94.84 | 2 – 3 | 1 – 3 | 3 – 1 | 1 – 3 | —N/a |
| 22 | 1 | Callan Rydz 91.32 | 3 – 0 | Yuki Yamada 83.36 | 3 – 2 | 3 – 0 | 3 – 0 | —N/a | |
| 23 | 1 | Darius Labanauskas 89.35 | 1 – 3 | Mike De Decker 89.36 | 3 – 1 | 0 – 3 | 2 – 3 | 0 – 3 | —N/a |
| 24 | 2 | Ian White 90.92 | 3 – 1 | Chris Landman 83.21 | 3 – 2 | 3 – 0 | 2 – 3 | 3 – 0 | —N/a |
| 25 | 1 | Adam Hunt 89.26 | 3 – 0 | Boris Krčmar 89.04 | 3 – 1 | 3 – 1 | 3 – 2 | —N/a | |
| 26 | 1 | Ted Evetts 87.93 | 1 – 3 | Jim Williams 89.71 | 0 – 3 | 1 – 3 | 3 – 0 | 1 – 3 | —N/a |
| 27 | 1 | Rowby-John Rodriguez 97.50 | 3 – 0 | Nick Kenny 82.14 | 3 – 0 | 3 – 1 | 3 – 0 | —N/a | |
| 28 | 2 | Michael van Gerwen 94.54 | 3 – 1 | Chas Barstow 87.37 | 2 – 3 | 3 – 1 | 3 – 0 | 3 – 1 | —N/a |

Sunday, 19 December

| Match # | Round | Player 1 | Score | Player 2 | Set 1 | Set 2 | Set 3 | Set 4 | Set 5 |
|---|---|---|---|---|---|---|---|---|---|
| 29 | 1 | Maik Kuivenhoven 88.88 | 3 – 1 | Ky Smith 79.36 | 3 – 1 | 3 – 0 | 1 – 3 | 3 – 1 | —N/a |
| 30 | 1 | Jason Heaver 84.28 | 3 – 1 | Gordon Mathers 81.61 | 3 – 1 | 3 – 2 | 2 – 3 | 3 – 0 | —N/a |
| 31 | 1 | Alan Soutar 89.46 | 3 – 2 | Diogo Portela 90.29 | 2 – 3 | 3 – 1 | 3 – 1 | 2 – 3 | 3 – 1 |
| 32 | 2 | Stephen Bunting 88.36 | 2 – 3 | Ross Smith 94.34 | 0 – 3 | 3 – 2 | 3 – 1 | 1 – 3 | 2 – 4 |
| 33 | 1 | Martijn Kleermaker 91.17 | 3 – 1 | John Michael 83.37 | 3 – 0 | 3 – 2 | 1 – 3 | 3 – 0 | —N/a |
| 34 | 1 | Florian Hempel 89.18 | 3 – 0 | Martin Schindler 88.52 | 3 – 1 | 3 – 2 | 3 – 1 | —N/a | |
| 35 | 1 | Steve Beaton 90.69 | 3 – 2 | Fallon Sherrock 88.74 | 3 – 2 | 2 – 3 | 3 – 0 | 0 – 3 | 3 – 1 |
| 36 | 2 | Jonny Clayton 103.70 | 3 – 2 | Keane Barry 95.85 | 3 – 1 | 2 – 3 | 1 – 3 | 3 – 1 | 3 – 0 |

Monday, 20 December

| Match # | Round | Player 1 | Score | Player 2 | Set 1 | Set 2 | Set 3 | Set 4 | Set 5 |
|---|---|---|---|---|---|---|---|---|---|
| 37 | 1 | Luke Woodhouse 91.52 | 3 – 1 | James Wilson 85.81 | 2 – 3 | 3 – 1 | 3 – 2 | 3 – 1 | —N/a |
| 38 | 1 | Rusty-Jake Rodriguez 93.86 | 3 – 1 | Ben Robb 87.47 | 3 – 2 | 2 – 3 | 3 – 0 | 3 – 1 | —N/a |
| 39 | 1 | Raymond van Barneveld 96.70 | 3 – 0 | Lourence Ilagan 82.52 | 3 – 1 | 3 – 0 | 3 – 1 | —N/a | |
| 40 | 2 | James Wade 83.74 | 3 – 1 | Maik Kuivenhoven 88.60 | 3 – 1 | 3 – 1 | 0 – 3 | 3 – 1 | —N/a |

Tuesday, 21 December

| Match # | Round | Player 1 | Score | Player 2 | Set 1 | Set 2 | Set 3 | Set 4 | Set 5 |
|---|---|---|---|---|---|---|---|---|---|
| 41 | 1 | Lewy Williams 93.05 | 3 – 0 | Toyokazu Shibata 75.17 | 3 – 1 | 3 – 1 | 3 – 0 | —N/a | |
| 42 | 1 | Jason Lowe 88.89 | 3 – 0 | Daniel Larsson 78.13 | 3 – 0 | 3 – 1 | 3 – 0 | —N/a | |
| 43 | 2 | Mervyn King 92.72 | 3 – 2 | Ryan Joyce 93.47 | 1 – 3 | 0 – 3 | 3 – 0 | 3 – 0 | 3 – 0 |
| 44 | 2 | Dave Chisnall 96.43 | 3 – 0 | Mike De Decker 96.43 | 3 – 2 | 3 – 1 | 3 – 1 | —N/a | |
| 45 | 2 | Vincent van der Voort 89.55 | 3 – 0 | Adam Hunt 92.01 | 3 – 2 | 3 – 2 | 3 – 0 | —N/a | |
| 46 | 2 | Michael Smith 106.32 | 3 – 0 | Ron Meulenkamp 90.66 | 3 – 0 | 3 – 1 | 3 – 0 | —N/a | |
| 47 | 2 | Dimitri Van den Bergh 101.78 | 1 – 3 | Florian Hempel 98.37 | 2 – 3 | 3 – 0 | 1 – 3 | 0 – 3 | —N/a |
| 48 | 2 | Devon Petersen 87.03 | 0 – 3 | Raymond Smith 93.25 | 0 – 3 | 1 – 3 | 2 – 3 | —N/a | |

Wednesday, 22 December

| Match # | Round | Player 1 | Score | Player 2 | Set 1 | Set 2 | Set 3 | Set 4 | Set 5 |
|---|---|---|---|---|---|---|---|---|---|
| 49 | 2 | Ryan Searle 92.45 | 3 – 0 | William Borland 77.69 | 3 – 0 | 3 – 2 | 3 – 2 | —N/a | |
| 50 | 2 | Glen Durrant 80.45 | 0 – 3 | William O'Connor 90.74 | 1 – 3 | 0 – 3 | 0 – 3 | —N/a | |
| 51 | 2 | Luke Humphries 92.91 | 3 – 0 | Rowby-John Rodriguez 82.64 | 3 – 0 | 3 – 1 | 3 – 1 | —N/a | |
| 52 | 2 | Joe Cullen 96.96 | 3 – 2 | Jim Williams 89.76 | 0 – 3 | 3 – 0 | 1 – 3 | 3 – 0 | 3 – 1 |
| 53 | 2 | Nathan Aspinall 93.15 | 3 – 2 | Joe Murnan 87.86 | 2 – 3 | 3 – 1 | 1 – 3 | 3 – 2 | 3 – 1 |
| 54 | 2 | Dirk van Duijvenbode 88.69 | 3 – 2 | Boris Koltsov 86.34 | 3 – 2 | 0 – 3 | 1 – 3 | 3 – 1 | 4 – 2 |
| 55 | 2 | Kim Huybrechts 88.71 | 3 – 1 | Steve Beaton 85.72 | 1 – 3 | 3 – 1 | 3 – 1 | 3 – 2 | —N/a |
| 56 | 2 | Simon Whitlock 87.93 | 1 – 3 | Martijn Kleermaker 88.84 | 2 – 3 | 3 – 2 | 1 – 3 | 0 – 3 | —N/a |

Thursday, 23 December

| Match # | Round | Player 1 | Score | Player 2 | Set 1 | Set 2 | Set 3 | Set 4 | Set 5 |
|---|---|---|---|---|---|---|---|---|---|
| 57 | 2 | Damon Heta 94.65 | 3 – 1 | Luke Woodhouse 91.15 | 3 – 2 | 3 – 1 | 2 – 3 | 3 – 0 | —N/a |
| 58 | 2 | Brendan Dolan 100.02 | 0 – 3 | Callan Rydz 102.73 | 1 – 3 | 0 – 3 | 2 – 3 | —N/a | |
| 59 | 2 | Mensur Suljović 88.34 | 2 – 3 | Alan Soutar 90.92 | 3 – 1 | 3 – 0 | 2 – 3 | 2 – 3 | 4 – 6 |
| 60 | 2 | José de Sousa 96.15 | 3 – 2 | Jason Lowe 95.01 | 2 – 3 | 2 – 3 | 3 – 1 | 3 – 1 | 3 – 0 |
| 61 | 2 | Danny Noppert 88.42 | 3 – 1 | Jason Heaver 85.19 | 1 – 3 | 3 – 1 | 3 – 0 | 3 – 1 | —N/a |
| 62 | 2 | Gabriel Clemens 86.29 | 3 – 0 | Lewy Williams 75.12 | 3 – 0 | 3 – 2 | 3 – 1 | —N/a | |
| 63 | 2 | Rob Cross 90.38 | 3 – 1 | Raymond van Barneveld 92.45 | 1 – 3 | 3 – 1 | 3 – 2 | 3 – 0 | —N/a |
| 64 | 2 | Chris Dobey 92.68 | 3 – 2 | Rusty-Jake Rodriguez 90.45 | 2 – 3 | 2 – 3 | 3 – 1 | 3 – 1 | 3 – 1 |

Monday, 27 December

| Match # | Round | Player 1 | Score | Player 2 | Set 1 | Set 2 | Set 3 | Set 4 | Set 5 | Set 6 | Set 7 |
|---|---|---|---|---|---|---|---|---|---|---|---|
| 65 | 3 | Ross Smith 85.70 | 3 – 4 | Dirk van Duijvenbode 91.71 | 3 – 1 | 3 – 2 | 3 – 2 | 2 – 3 | 0 – 3 | 1 – 3 | 1 – 3 |
| 66 | 3 | Michael Smith 97.42 | 4 – 2 | William O'Connor 92.46 | 1 – 3 | 3 – 2 | 3 – 1 | 3 – 0 | 2 – 3 | 3 – 2 | —N/a |
| 67 | 3 | Florian Hempel 87.66 | 1 – 4 | Raymond Smith 94.79 | 1 – 3 | 2 – 3 | 3 – 2 | 1 – 3 | 2 – 3 | —N/a | |
| 68 | 3 | James Wade | w/o | Vincent van der Voort | —N/a | | | | | | |
| 69 | 3 | Gerwyn Price 92.04 | 4 – 3 | Kim Huybrechts 93.60 | 3 – 0 | 1 – 3 | 2 – 3 | 3 – 0 | 3 – 0 | 2 – 3 | 6 – 5 |
| 70 | 3 | Jonny Clayton 102.56 | 4 – 0 | Gabriel Clemens 87.66 | 3 – 1 | 3 – 1 | 3 – 2 | 3 – 0 | —N/a | | |

Tuesday, 28 December

| Match # | Round | Player 1 | Score | Player 2 | Set 1 | Set 2 | Set 3 | Set 4 | Set 5 | Set 6 | Set 7 |
|---|---|---|---|---|---|---|---|---|---|---|---|
| 71 | 3 | Steve Lennon 86.72 | 0 – 4 | Mervyn King 92.03 | 1 – 3 | 1 – 3 | 1 – 3 | 2 – 3 | —N/a | | |
| 72 | 3 | Ryan Searle 92.28 | 4 – 2 | Danny Noppert 90.44 | 2 – 3 | 3 – 1 | 3 – 2 | 1 – 3 | 3 – 2 | 3 – 0 | —N/a |
| 73 | 3 | Joe Cullen 95.03 | 3 – 4 | Martijn Kleermaker 88.94 | 0 – 3 | 1 – 3 | 2 – 3 | 3 – 0 | 3 – 2 | 3 – 0 | 2 – 4 |
| 74 | 3 | Rob Cross 99.77 | 4 – 3 | Daryl Gurney 99.49 | 3 – 2 | 3 – 2 | 2 – 3 | 3 – 2 | 1 – 3 | 2 – 3 | 3 – 1 |
| 75 | 3 | Peter Wright 102.15 | 4 – 2 | Damon Heta 94.38 | 1 – 3 | 2 – 3 | 3 – 2 | 3 – 1 | 3 – 0 | 3 – 0 | —N/a |
| 76 | 3 | Michael van Gerwen | w/o | Chris Dobey | —N/a | | | | | | |

Wednesday, 29 December

| Match # | Round | Player 1 | Score | Player 2 | Set 1 | Set 2 | Set 3 | Set 4 | Set 5 | Set 6 | Set 7 |
|---|---|---|---|---|---|---|---|---|---|---|---|
| 77 | 3 | José de Sousa 83.89 | 3 – 4 | Alan Soutar 88.54 | 3 – 2 | 0 – 3 | 1 – 3 | 3 – 0 | 3 – 2 | 2 – 3 | 1 – 3 |
| 78 | 3 | Dave Chisnall | w/o | Luke Humphries | —N/a | | | | | | |
| 79 | 3 | Nathan Aspinall 95.56 | 0 – 4 | Callan Rydz 98.35 | 1 – 3 | 1 – 3 | 0 – 3 | 2 – 3 | —N/a | | |
| 80 | 3 | Gary Anderson 90.31 | 4 – 3 | Ian White 88.56 | 2 – 3 | 0 – 3 | 2 – 3 | 3 – 1 | 3 – 0 | 3 – 2 | 3 – 1 |
| 81 | 4 | Gerwyn Price 96.66 | 4 – 1 | Dirk van Duijvenbode 83.22 | 2 – 3 | 3 – 0 | 3 – 0 | 3 – 0 | 3 – 0 | —N/a | |
| 82 | 4 | Jonny Clayton 102.48 | 3 – 4 | Michael Smith 99.84 | 3 – 2 | 3 – 1 | 1 – 3 | 2 – 3 | 1 – 3 | 3 – 1 | 4 – 6 |

Thursday, 30 December

| Match # | Round | Player 1 | Score | Player 2 | Set 1 | Set 2 | Set 3 | Set 4 | Set 5 | Set 6 | Set 7 |
|---|---|---|---|---|---|---|---|---|---|---|---|
| 83 | 4 | Raymond Smith 83.72 | 3 – 4 | Mervyn King 87.29 | 3 – 2 | 3 – 0 | 0 – 3 | 3 – 0 | 0 – 3 | 1 – 3 | 0 – 3 |
| 84 | 4 | Alan Soutar 87.79 | 1 – 4 | Callan Rydz 96.43 | 3 – 1 | 1 – 3 | 0 – 3 | 0 – 3 | 0 – 3 | —N/a | |
| 85 | 4 | Chris Dobey 97.81 | 3 – 4 | Luke Humphries 97.77 | 3 – 2 | 3 – 0 | 2 – 3 | 3 – 1 | 1 – 3 | 1 – 3 | 3 – 5 |
| 86 | 4 | James Wade 93.15 | 4 – 0 | Martijn Kleermaker 88.98 | 3 – 0 | 3 – 1 | 3 – 2 | 3 – 1 | —N/a | | |
| 87 | 4 | Gary Anderson 97.27 | 4 – 3 | Rob Cross 93.36 | 2 – 3 | 3 – 0 | 3 – 1 | 3 – 1 | 1 – 3 | 2 – 3 | 3 – 1 |
| 88 | 4 | Peter Wright 98.91 | 4 – 1 | Ryan Searle 88.24 | 3 – 1 | 3 – 2 | 1 – 3 | 3 – 0 | 3 – 1 | —N/a | |

Saturday, 1 January

| Match # | Round | Player 1 | Score | Player 2 | Set 1 | Set 2 | Set 3 | Set 4 | Set 5 | Set 6 | Set 7 | Set 8 | Set 9 |
|---|---|---|---|---|---|---|---|---|---|---|---|---|---|
| 89 | QF | James Wade 85.35 | 5 – 0 | Mervyn King 83.18 | 3 – 2 | 3 – 2 | 3 – 1 | 3 – 2 | 3 – 1 | —N/a | | | |
| 90 | QF | Luke Humphries 94.92 | 2 – 5 | Gary Anderson 96.32 | 3 – 0 | 2 – 3 | 1 – 3 | 3 – 1 | 2 – 3 | 2 – 3 | 2 – 3 | —N/a | |
| 91 | QF | Peter Wright 99.75 | 5 – 4 | Callan Rydz 97.80 | 0 – 3 | 2 – 3 | 3 – 1 | 1 – 3 | 3 – 1 | 3 – 2 | 1 – 3 | 3 – 0 | 4 – 2 |
| 92 | QF | Gerwyn Price 99.57 | 4 – 5 | Michael Smith 101.94 | 3 – 2 | 0 – 3 | 3 – 2 | 1 – 3 | 3 – 1 | 0 – 3 | 3 – 2 | 2 – 3 | 1 – 3 |

Sunday, 2 January

| Match # | Round | Player 1 | Score | Player 2 | Set 1 | Set 2 | Set 3 | Set 4 | Set 5 | Set 6 | Set 7 | Set 8 | Set 9 | Set 10 | Set 11 |
|---|---|---|---|---|---|---|---|---|---|---|---|---|---|---|---|
| 93 | SF | Michael Smith 100.98 | 6 – 3 | James Wade 95.43 | 3 – 2 | 3 – 1 | 2 – 3 | 3 – 2 | 3 – 1 | 3 – 0 | 1 – 3 | 2 – 3 | 3 – 1 | —N/a | |
| 94 | SF | Peter Wright 104.38 | 6 – 4 | Gary Anderson 102.72 | 3 – 2 | 3 – 1 | 3 – 1 | 1 – 3 | 1 – 3 | 3 – 1 | 1 – 3 | 3 – 1 | 1 – 3 | 3 – 2 | —N/a |

Monday, 3 January

| Match # | Round | Player 1 | Score | Player 2 | Set 1 | Set 2 | Set 3 | Set 4 | Set 5 | Set 6 | Set 7 | Set 8 | Set 9 | Set 10 | Set 11 | Set 12 | Set 13 |
|---|---|---|---|---|---|---|---|---|---|---|---|---|---|---|---|---|---|
| 95 | F | Michael Smith 99.22 | 5 – 7 | Peter Wright 98.34 | 1 – 3 | 1 – 3 | 3 – 1 | 3 – 2 | 2 – 3 | 3 – 1 | 3 – 0 | 1 – 3 | 3 – 2 | 2 – 3 | 0 – 3 | 1 – 3 | —N/a |

== Draw ==
=== Final ===
Best of 13 sets Referee: Kirk Bevins (first half) and George Noble (second half); Alexandra Palace, London, England, 3 January 2022
| (9) Michael Smith | 5–7 | Peter Wright (2) |
1–3, 1–3, 3–1, 3–2, 2–3, 3–1, 3–0, 1–3, 3–2, 2–3, 0–3, 1–3
| 99.22 | Average (3 darts) | 98.34 |
| 48 | 100+ scores | 52 |
| 35 | 140+ scores | 42 |
| 24 | 180 scores | 17 |
| 167 | Highest checkout | 148 |
| 1 | 100+ Checkouts | 4 |
| 35.38% | Checkout summary | 39.13% |

=== Finals ===
Quarter-finals (best of 9 sets); 1 January
1 | Gerwyn Price 99.57 | 4
9 | Michael Smith 101.94 | 5
4 | James Wade 86.50 | 5
21 | Mervyn King 86.67 | 0
2 | Peter Wright 99.75 | 5
Callan Rydz 97.80 | 4
19 | Luke Humphries 94.92 | 2
6 | Gary Anderson 96.32 | 5

Semi-finals (best of 11 sets); 2 January
9 | Michael Smith 100.98 | 6
4 | James Wade 95.43 | 3
2 | Peter Wright 104.38 | 6
6 | Gary Anderson 102.72 | 4

Final (best of 13 sets); 3 January
9 | Michael Smith 99.22 | 5
2 | Peter Wright 98.34 | 7

=== Top half ===
==== Section 1 ====
First round (best of 5 sets); 15–21 December
Ritchie Edhouse 84.26 | 3
Alt | Peter Hudson 82.85 | 2
Steve Beaton 90.69 | 3
Q | Fallon Sherrock 88.74 | 2
Ross Smith 85.15 | 3
Q | Jeff Smith 79.79 | 0
Jermaine Wattimena 90.84 | 0
Q | Boris Koltsov 90.50 | 3
Keane Barry 83.59 | 3
Q | Royden Lam 81.61 | 2
Lewy Williams 93.05 | 3
Q | Toyokazu Shibata 75.17 | 0
Ron Meulenkamp 87.32 | 3
Q | Lisa Ashton 73.99 | 0
William O'Connor 96.02 | 3
Q | Danny Lauby 93.46 | 2

Second round (best of 5 sets); 15–23 December
1 | Gerwyn Price 101.28 | 3
Ritchie Edhouse 95.67 | 1
32 | Kim Huybrechts 88.71 | 3
Steve Beaton 85.72 | 1
16 | Stephen Bunting 88.36 | 2
Ross Smith 94.34 | 3
17 | Dirk van Duijvenbode 88.69 | 3
Q | Boris Koltsov 86.34 | 2
8 | Jonny Clayton 103.70 | 3
Keane Barry 95.85 | 2
25 | Gabriel Clemens 86.29 | 3
Lewy Williams 75.12 | 0
9 | Michael Smith 106.32 | 3
Ron Meulenkamp 90.66 | 0
24 | Glen Durrant 80.45 | 0
William O'Connor 90.74 | 3

Third round (best of 7 sets); 27–29 December
1 | Gerwyn Price 92.04 | 4
32 | Kim Huybrechts 93.60 | 3
Ross Smith 85.70 | 3
17 | Dirk van Duijvenbode 91.71 | 4
8 | Jonny Clayton 99.56 | 4
25 | Gabriel Clemens 87.66 | 0
9 | Michael Smith 97.42 | 4
William O'Connor 92.46 | 2

Fourth round (best of 7 sets); 29–30 December
1 | Gerwyn Price 96.66 | 4
17 | Dirk van Duijvenbode 83.22 | 1
8 | Jonny Clayton 102.48 | 3
9 | Michael Smith 99.84 | 4

Quarter-finals (best of 9 sets); 1 January
1 | Gerwyn Price 99.57 | 4
9 | Michael Smith 101.94 | 5

==== Section 2 ====
First round (best of 5 sets); 15–21 December
Maik Kuivenhoven 88.88 | 3
Q | Ky Smith 79.36 | 1
Adam Hunt 89.26 | 3
Q | Boris Krčmar 89.04 | 0
Ted Evetts 87.93 | 1
Q | Jim Williams 89.71 | 3
Martijn Kleermaker 91.17 | 3
Q | John Michael 83.37 | 1
Florian Hempel 89.18 | 3
Q | Martin Schindler 88.52 | 0
Jamie Hughes 96.05 | 1
Q | Raymond Smith 94.84 | 3
Steve Lennon 93.22 | 3
Q | Madars Razma 94.11 | 1
Ryan Joyce 93.44 | 3
Q | Roman Benecký 86.80 | 2

Second round (best of 5 sets); 15–23 December
4 | James Wade 83.74 | 3
Maik Kuivenhoven 88.60 | 1
29 | Vincent van der Voort 89.55 | 3
Adam Hunt 92.01 | 0
13 | Joe Cullen 96.96 | 3
Q | Jim Williams 89.76 | 2
20 | Simon Whitlock 87.93 | 1
Martijn Kleermaker 88.84 | 3
5 | Dimitri Van den Bergh 101.78 | 1
Florian Hempel 98.37 | 3
28 | Devon Petersen 87.03 | 0
Q | Raymond Smith 93.25 | 3
12 | Krzysztof Ratajski 94.39 | 1
Steve Lennon 91.34 | 3
21 | Mervyn King 92.72 | 3
Ryan Joyce 93.47 | 2

Third round (best of 7 sets); 27–29 December
4 | James Wade | w/o
29 | Vincent van der Voort | w/d
13 | Joe Cullen 95.03 | 3
Martijn Kleermaker 88.94 | 4
Florian Hempel 87.66 | 1
Q | Raymond Smith 94.79 | 4
Steve Lennon 86.72 | 0
21 | Mervyn King 92.03 | 4

Fourth round (best of 7 sets); 29–30 December
4 | James Wade 93.15 | 4
Martijn Kleermaker 88.98 | 0
Q | Raymond Smith 83.72 | 3
21 | Mervyn King 87.29 | 4

Quarter-finals (best of 9 sets); 1 January
4 | James Wade 86.50 | 5
21 | Mervyn King 86.67 | 0

=== Bottom half ===
==== Section 3 ====
First round (best of 5 sets); 15–21 December
Ryan Meikle 89.30 | 3
Q | Fabian Schmutzler 89.14 | 0
Luke Woodhouse 91.52 | 3
Q | James Wilson 85.81 | 1
William Borland 94.81 | 3
Q | Bradley Brooks 94.22 | 2
Jason Heaver 84.28 | 3
Alt | Gordon Mathers 81.61 | 1
Jason Lowe 88.89 | 3
Q | Daniel Larsson 78.13 | 0
Alan Soutar 89.46 | 3
Q | Diogo Portela 90.29 | 2
Joe Murnan 79.33 | 3
Q | Paul Lim 79.35 | 2
Callan Rydz 91.32 | 3
Q | Yuki Yamada 83.36 | 0

Second round (best of 5 sets); 15–23 December
2 | Peter Wright 92.19 | 3
Ryan Meikle 79.29 | 0
31 | Damon Heta 94.65 | 3
Luke Woodhouse 91.15 | 1
15 | Ryan Searle 92.45 | 3
William Borland 77.69 | 0
18 | Danny Noppert 88.42 | 3
Jason Heaver 85.19 | 1
7 | José de Sousa 96.15 | 3
Jason Lowe 95.01 | 2
26 | Mensur Suljović 88.34 | 2
Alan Soutar 90.92 | 3
10 | Nathan Aspinall 93.15 | 3
Joe Murnan 87.86 | 2
23 | Brendan Dolan 100.02 | 0
Callan Rydz 102.73 | 3

Third round (best of 7 sets); 27–29 December
2 | Peter Wright 102.15 | 4
31 | Damon Heta 94.38 | 2
15 | Ryan Searle 92.28 | 4
18 | Danny Noppert 90.44 | 2
7 | José de Sousa 83.89 | 3
Alan Soutar 88.54 | 4
10 | Nathan Aspinall 95.56 | 0
Callan Rydz 98.35 | 4

Fourth round (best of 7 sets); 29–30 December
2 | Peter Wright 98.91 | 4
15 | Ryan Searle 88.24 | 1
Alan Soutar 87.79 | 1
Callan Rydz 96.43 | 4

Quarter-finals (best of 9 sets); 1 January
2 | Peter Wright 99.75 | 5
Callan Rydz 97.80 | 4

==== Section 4 ====
First round (best of 5 sets); 15–21 December
Chas Barstow 93.02 | 3
Q | John Norman Jnr 86.54 | 1
Rusty-Jake Rodriguez 93.86 | 3
Q | Ben Robb 87.47 | 1
Darius Labanauskas 89.35 | 1
Alt | Mike De Decker 89.36 | 3
Rowby-John Rodriguez 97.50 | 3
Q | Nick Kenny 82.14 | 0
Adrian Lewis 94.42 | 3
Q | Matt Campbell 93.57 | 1
Scott Mitchell 88.02 | 0
Q | Chris Landman 88.97 | 3
Raymond van Barneveld 96.70 | 3
Q | Lourence Ilagan 82.52 | 0
Ricky Evans 96.20 | 3
Q | Nitin Kumar 83.80 | 0

Second round (best of 5 sets); 15–23 December
3 | Michael van Gerwen 94.54 | 3
Chas Barstow 87.37 | 1
30 | Chris Dobey 92.68 | 3
Rusty-Jake Rodriguez 90.45 | 2
14 | Dave Chisnall 96.43 | 3
Alt | Mike De Decker 96.43 | 0
19 | Luke Humphries 92.91 | 3
Rowby-John Rodriguez 82.64 | 0
6 | Gary Anderson 93.74 | 3
Adrian Lewis 92.07 | 1
27 | Ian White 90.92 | 3
Q | Chris Landman 83.21 | 1
11 | Rob Cross 90.38 | 3
Raymond van Barneveld 92.45 | 1
22 | Daryl Gurney 95.90 | 3
Ricky Evans 93.11 | 1

Third round (best of 7 sets); 27–29 December
3 | Michael van Gerwen | w/d
30 | Chris Dobey | w/o
14 | Dave Chisnall | w/d
19 | Luke Humphries | w/o
6 | Gary Anderson 90.31 | 4
27 | Ian White 88.56 | 3
11 | Rob Cross 99.77 | 4
22 | Daryl Gurney 99.49 | 3

Fourth round (best of 7 sets); 29–30 December
30 | Chris Dobey 97.81 | 3
19 | Luke Humphries 97.77 | 4
6 | Gary Anderson 97.27 | 4
11 | Rob Cross 93.36 | 3

Quarter-finals (best of 9 sets); 1 January
19 | Luke Humphries 94.92 | 2
6 | Gary Anderson 96.32 | 5

== Top averages ==
This table shows the highest averages achieved by players throughout the tournament.

| # | Player | Round | Average | Result |
|---|---|---|---|---|
| 1 | Michael Smith | R2 | 106.32 | Won |
| 2 | Peter Wright | SF | 104.38 | Won |
| 3 | Jonny Clayton | R2 | 103.70 | Won |
| 4 | Callan Rydz | R2 | 102.73 | Won |
| 5 | Gary Anderson | SF | 102.72 | Lost |
| 6 | Jonny Clayton | R3 | 102.56 | Won |
| 7 | Jonny Clayton | R4 | 102.48 | Lost |
| 8 | Peter Wright | R3 | 102.15 | Won |
| 9 | Michael Smith | QF | 101.94 | Won |
| 10 | Dimitri Van den Bergh | R2 | 101.78 | Lost |

== Representation ==
This table shows the number of players by country in the tournament. Originally, a total of 31 nationalities were to be represented, which would surpass the record of the 2021 edition by two. However, after late withdrawals, the total number of nationalities represented dropped to 29 - equalling the maximum of 2021.

| | (England) ENG | (Scotland) SCO | (Wales) WAL | (Netherlands) NED | (Australia) AUS | (Germany) GER | (Republic of Ireland) IRL | (Belgium) BEL | (Northern Ireland) NIR | (Portugal) POR | (Austria) AUT | (Poland) POL | (South Africa) RSA | (Russia) RUS | (Canada) CAN | (Japan) JPN | (Brazil) BRA | (Croatia) CRO | (Czech Republic) CZE | (Greece) GRE | (Hong Kong) HKG | (India) IND | (Latvia) LAT | (Lithuania) LTU | (New Zealand) NZL | (Philippines) PHI | (Singapore) SGP | (Sweden) SWE | (United States) USA | Total |
|---|---|---|---|---|---|---|---|---|---|---|---|---|---|---|---|---|---|---|---|---|---|---|---|---|---|---|---|---|---|---|
| Final | 1 | 1 | 0 | | | | | | | | | | | | | | | | | | | | | | | | | | | 2 |
| Semi-final | 2 | 2 | 0 | | | | | | | | | | | | | | | | | | | | | | | | | | | 4 |
| Quarter-final | 5 | 2 | 1 | 0 | | | | | | | | | | | | | | | | | | | | | | | | | | 8 |
| Round 4 | 8 | 3 | 2 | 2 | 1 | 0 | | | | | | | | | | | | | | | | | | | | | | | | 16 |
| Round 3 | 13 | 3 | 2 | 5 | 2 | 2 | 2 | 1 | 1 | 1 | 0 | | | | | | | | | | | | | | | | | | | 32 |
| Round 2 | 27 | 4 | 4 | 9 | 3 | 2 | 3 | 3 | 2 | 1 | 3 | 1 | 1 | 1 | 0 | | | | | | | | | | | | | | | 64 |
| Round 1 | 22 | 2 | 3 | 6 | 3 | 3 | 3 | 1 | 0 | | 2 | 0 | | 1 | 3 | 2 | 1 | 1 | 1 | 1 | 1 | 1 | 1 | 1 | 1 | 1 | 1 | 1 | 1 | 64 |
| Total | 35 | 4 | 5 | 10 | 5 | 4 | 3 | 3 | 2 | 1 | 3 | 1 | 1 | 1 | 3 | 2 | 1 | 1 | 1 | 1 | 1 | 1 | 1 | 1 | 1 | 1 | 1 | 1 | 1 | 96 |

== Broadcasting rights ==
=== Television ===
| Country | Broadcaster |
|---|---|
| Australia | Fox Sports |
| Austria; Germany; Switzerland | Sport1, DAZN |
| Belgium | VTM 2, VTM 4 |
| Brazil; Canada; Japan; Italy; Spain; United States | DAZN |
| Croatia | Sportska televizija |
| Czech Republic; Slovakia | Nova Sport |
| Denmark; Estonia; Finland; Latvia; Lithuania; Norway; Sweden | Viaplay |
| France | L'Equipe |
| Hungary | SportTV |
| Iceland | Stöð 2 Sport |
| Netherlands | RTL 7 |
| New Zealand | Sky Sport (New Zealand) |
| Poland | TVP Sport |
| Russia | Match TV |
| South Africa | SuperSport |
| United Kingdom; Ireland | Sky Sports Darts |

=== Radio ===
Radio coverage in the UK was provided by Talksport 2, with commentary from Ian Danter, Mark Wilson, Chris Murphy, Rob Mullarkey, Paul Nicholson and Chris Mason.
