= Lewy Williams =

Welsh darts player (born 2002)

Personal information
- Full name: Lewis Williams
- Nickname: "The Prince of Wales"
- Born: 18 January 2002 (age 24) Swansea, Wales
- Home town: Pontardawe, Wales

Sport
- Sport: Darts
- Playing since: 2017
- Darts: 25g Target Signature Gen 1
- Laterality: Right-handed
- Walk-on music: "Ruby" by Kaiser Chiefs

Organisation (see split in darts)
- PDC: 2018–present

PDC premier events – best performances
- World Championship: Last 64: 2022, 2023
- UK Open: Last 64: 2020
- European Championship: Last 32: 2021

Lewis "Lewy" Williams (born 18 January 2002) is a Welsh professional darts player who competes in Professional Darts Corporation (PDC) events.

== Career ==
Williams qualified for the 2020 UK Open via the Riley's qualifiers, and defeated Robert Owen, Adrian Gray and José de Sousa, before losing in a last leg decider in the last 64 to Steve West.

He secured a two-year PDC Tour Card at UK Qualifying School in February 2021, sealing his professional status with a day to spare. On his PDC Pro Tour debut at 2021 Players Championship 1, Williams beat 2020 World Matchplay champion Dimitri Van den Bergh, Kim Huybrechts and three-time PDC World champion Michael van Gerwen to reach the last 16 where he was defeated by 2021 Masters champion Jonny Clayton.

Williams made his television debut on 14 October 2021 in the 2021 European Championship, losing in the first round to José de Sousa 6–4.

== Personal life ==
Born in Swansea, Williams moved to Liverpool, where he trained as a barber.

== World Championship results ==
=== PDC ===
- 2022: Second round (lost to Gabriel Clemens 0–3) (sets)
- 2023: Second round (lost to Michael van Gerwen 0–3)

== Personal life ==
Lewy attended Cwmtawe Community School.

== Performance timeline ==
=== PDC ===
Tournament	2020	2021	2022	2023
PDC Ranked televised events
World Championship	DNQ		2R	2R
UK Open	4R	2R	2R	3R
European Championship	DNP	1R	DNQ	
Non-ranked televised events
World Youth Championship	RR	2R	RR	RR
Career statistics
Year-end ranking	170	93	60	85

==== European Tour ====
Tournament	2021	2022	2023
Hungarian Trophy	3R	DNQ	
International Open	NH	3R	DNQ
German Open	NH	2R	DNQ
Baltic Sea Open	NH		2R

==== Players Championships ====
Season	1	2	3	4	5	6	7	8	9	10	11	12	13	14	15	16	17	18	19	20	21	22	23	24	25	26	27	28	29	30
2021	BOL; 4R	BOL; 1R	BOL; 1R	BOL; 1R	MIL; 1R	MIL; 2R	MIL; 1R	MIL; 3R	NIE; 1R	NIE; 2R	NIE; 4R	NIE; 1R	MIL; 2R	MIL; 1R	MIL; 1R	MIL; 4R	COV; 1R	COV; 2R	COV; 1R	COV; 1R	BAR; QF	BAR; 2R	BAR; 1R	BAR; 1R	BAR; 1R	BAR; 1R	BAR; 2R	BAR; 1R	BAR; 2R	BAR; 1R
2022	BAR; 1R	BAR; 2R	WIG; 4R	WIG; 2R	BAR; 2R	BAR; 3R	NIE; 1R	NIE; 1R	BAR; 2R	BAR; 2R	BAR; 1R	BAR; 3R	BAR; 1R	WIG; 1R	WIG; 2R	NIE; 2R	NIE; 1R	BAR; 1R	BAR; 1R	BAR; 1R	BAR; 1R	BAR; 3R	BAR; 1R	BAR; 1R	BAR; 2R	BAR; DNP				
2023	BAR; 1R	BAR; 1R	BAR; 2R	BAR; 1R	BAR; 1R	BAR; 2R	HIL; 1R	HIL; 2R	WIG; 1R	WIG; 1R	LEI; 1R	LEI; 1R	HIL; 1R	HIL; 2R	LEI; 2R	LEI; 1R	HIL; DNP		BAR; 2R	BAR; 1R	BAR; 1R	BAR; 1R	BAR; 1R	BAR; Did not participate						

Performance Table Legend
W	Won the tournament	F	Finalist	SF	Semifinalist	QF	Quarterfinalist	#R; RR; L#	Lost in # round Round-robin; Last # stage	DQ	Disqualified
DNQ	Did not qualify	DNP	Did not participate	WD	Withdrew	NH	Tournament not held	#R; RR; L#	Lost in # round Round-robin; Last # stage	NYF	Not yet founded
