= William Borland (darts player) =

Scottish darts player (born 1996)

Personal information
- Nickname: "Big Willie"
- Born: 8 November 1996 (age 29) East Calder, West Lothian, Scotland

Sport
- Sport: Darts
- Playing since: 2008
- Darts: 24g Red Dragon
- Laterality: Right-handed
- Walk-on music: "A Little Respect" by Erasure

Organisation (see split in darts)
- BDO: 2017–2018
- PDC: 2019–present (Tour Card: 2020–2022, 2024–2025)

WDF major events – best performances
- World Masters: Last 48: 2017
- World Trophy: Last 16: 2018

PDC premier events – best performances
- World Championship: Last 64: 2022
- UK Open: Last 64: 2020, 2022, 2025
- European Championship: Last 16: 2021
- PC Finals: Last 64: 2020, 2021
- Masters: Last 32: 2025

William Borland (born 8 November 1996) is a Scottish darts player who competes in Professional Darts Corporation (PDC) events. He made the second round at the 2022 PDC World Championship, hitting a nine-dart finish in a last-leg decider against Bradley Brooks. He also reached the last 16 at both the 2018 BDO World Trophy and the 2021 European Championship.

== Career ==
In the BDO, Borland reached the last 48 of the 2017 World Masters and the last 16 of the 2018 World Trophy. He made the quarter-finals of the 2019 PDC World Youth Championship on 4 November but lost 6–3 to Keane Barry. On 19 January 2020, Borland won a two-year PDC Tour Card by finishing eighth on the UK Q-School Order of Merit.

Borland reached the third round of the 2021 Hungarian Darts Trophy following a win over Mensur Suljović but withdrew from the tournament for personal reasons. However, as only two European Tour events took place in 2021 due to the COVID-19 pandemic, this result helped him qualify for the 2021 European Championship as 26th seed. In the first round, he achieved a 6–3 win over 2012 champion Simon Whitlock. He lost 10–5 to Joe Cullen in the next round.

Borland made his world championship debut at the 2022 PDC World Championship. In his first-round match on 17 December 2021, he was involved in an deciding leg which saw him throw a nine-dart finish against Bradley Brooks, becoming the first player to win a televised match with a nine-darter in Professional Darts Corporation history. He was defeated in a 3–0 whitewash by Ryan Searle in the second round.

After a one-year absence from the Pro Tour, Borland regained his PDC Tour Card for 2024 through Q-School, finishing second on the UK Q-School Order of Merit.

Borland qualified for the 2025 PDC World Masters after defeating Mickey Mansell 2–1 in the final preliminary round. He was drawn against defending champion Stephen Bunting in the first round and took a 2–0 lead, but ultimately lost the match 3–2.

== World Championship results ==
=== PDC ===
- 2022: Second round (lost to Ryan Searle 0–3)

== Performance timeline ==
=== BDO ===
Tournament	2017	2018
BDO Ranked televised events
World Trophy	DNQ	2R
World Masters	4R	DNP

=== PDC ===
Tournament	2019	2020	2021	2022	2023	2024	2025
PDC Ranked televised events
World Championship	Did not qualify			2R	Did not qualify		
World Masters	Did not qualify						1R
UK Open	DNQ	4R	2R	4R	DNQ	1R	4R
European Championship	DNQ		2R	Did not qualify			
Players Championship Finals	DNQ	1R	1R	Did not qualify			
PDC Non-ranked televised events
World Youth Championship	QF	3R	Did not participate				
Career statistics
Season-end ranking (PDC)	189	108	55	71	–	136	108

==== European Tour ====
Tournament	2019	2021
European Open	1R	NH
Czech Open	1R	NH
Hungarian Trophy	NH	3R

==== Players Championships ====
Season	1	2	3	4	5	6	7	8	9	10	11	12	13	14	15	16	17	18	19	20	21	22	23	24	25	26	27	28	29	30	31	32	33	34
2020	BAR; 2R	BAR; 1R	WIG; 2R	WIG; 1R	WIG; 2R	WIG; 1R	BAR; 3R	BAR; 1R	MIL; 2R	MIL; 1R	MIL; 1R	MIL; 3R	MIL; 3R	NIE; 4R	NIE; 2R	NIE; 3R	NIE; 1R	NIE; 1R	COV; 4R	COV; 1R	COV; 2R	COV; 1R	COV; 1R											
2021	BOL; 1R	BOL; 1R	BOL; 1R	BOL; 1R	MIL; 3R	MIL; 1R	MIL; 4R	MIL; 1R	NIE; 1R	NIE; 4R	NIE; 1R	NIE; 1R	MIL; 1R	MIL; 2R	MIL; 2R	MIL; 3R	COV; 3R	COV; 3R	COV; 1R	COV; 1R	BAR; 2R	BAR; 2R	BAR; 4R	BAR; 1R	BAR; 1R	BAR; 1R	BAR; 2R	BAR; 3R	BAR; 1R	BAR; 1R				
2022	BAR; 1R	BAR; 2R	WIG; 1R	WIG; 1R	BAR; 1R	BAR; 2R	NIE; DNP	NIE; DNP	BAR; 1R	BAR; 1R	BAR; 1R	BAR; 1R	BAR; 2R	WIG; 1R	WIG; 1R	NIE; 1R	NIE; 1R	BAR; 1R	BAR; 1R	BAR; 1R	BAR; 1R	BAR; 1R	BAR; 1R	BAR; 1R	BAR; 3R	BAR; 2R	BAR; 2R	BAR; 1R	BAR; 1R	BAR; 1R				
2023 (Note: Not a Tour card holder)	Did not participate																												BAR; 1R	BAR; 1R				
2024	WIG; 1R	WIG; 2R	LEI; 2R	LEI; 1R	HIL; 2R	HIL; 1R	LEI; 2R	LEI; 1R	HIL; 1R	HIL; 1R	HIL; 1R	HIL; 1R	MIL; 1R	MIL; 1R	MIL; DNP			MIL; 1R	MIL; 1R	WIG; 4R	WIG; 1R	LEI; 3R	LEI; 1R	WIG; 2R	WIG; 2R	WIG; 1R	WIG; 1R	WIG; 1R	LEI; 3R	LEI; 1R				
2025	WIG; 2R	WIG; 1R	ROS; 2R	ROS; 1R	LEI; 1R	LEI; 1R	HIL; 2R	HIL; 1R	LEI; 1R	LEI; DNP	LEI; 1R	LEI; 1R	ROS; DNP		HIL; 3R	HIL; 2R	LEI; 2R	LEI; 1R	LEI; 1R	LEI; 1R	LEI; 1R	HIL; 1R	HIL; 2R	Did not participate							WIG; 1R	WIG; 3R	WIG; 1R	WIG; 1R

Performance Table Legend
W	Won the tournament	F	Finalist	SF	Semifinalist	QF	Quarterfinalist	#R; RR; Prel.	Lost in # round Round-robin; Preliminary round	DQ	Disqualified
DNQ	Did not qualify	DNP	Did not participate	WD	Withdrew	NH	Tournament not held	#R; RR; Prel.	Lost in # round Round-robin; Preliminary round	NYF	Not yet founded

== Nine-dart finishes ==
William Borland's televised nine-dart finishes
Date	Opponent	Tournament	Method
17 December 2021	(England) Bradley Brooks	PDC World Championship	3 x T20; 2 x T20, T19; 2 x T20, D12
