= Alan Soutar =

Scottish darts player (born 1978)

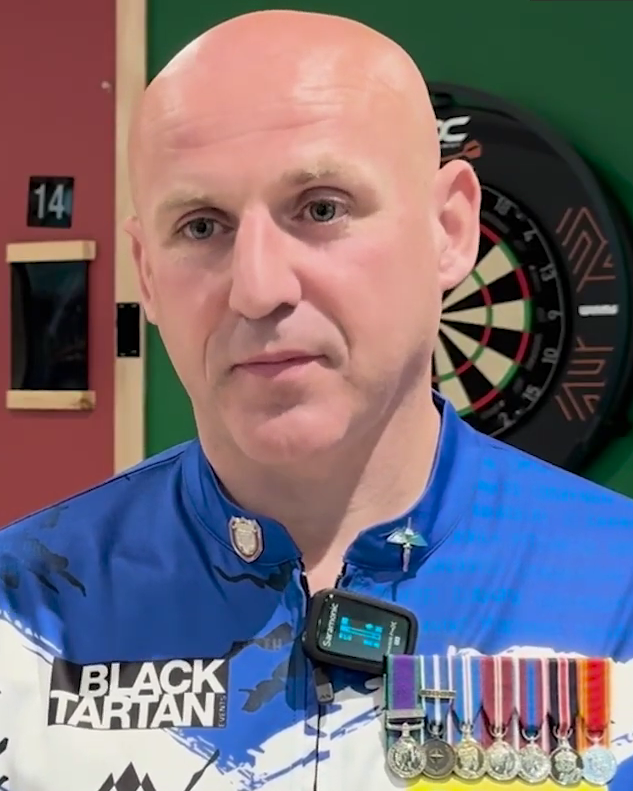
- Soutar in 2026

Personal information
- Nickname: "Soots"
- Born: 10 January 1978 (age 48) Dundee, Scotland
- Home town: Arbroath, Scotland

Sport
- Sport: Darts
- Playing since: 1995
- Darts: 24g Mission
- Laterality: Right-handed
- Walk-on music: "Freed from Desire" by Gala

Organisation (see split in darts)
- BDO: 2007–2021
- PDC: 2021–present (Tour Card: 2021–present)
- Current world ranking: (PDC) 61 (5 November 2026)

WDF major events – best performances
- World Championship: Last 32: 2011
- World Masters: Last 16: 2016, 2017

PDC premier events – best performances
- World Championship: Last 16: 2022, 2023
- UK Open: Last 16: 2021
- Grand Slam: Quarter-final: 2022
- PC Finals: Last 64: 2021

Other tournament wins
- Years
Bellrock Open	2011
Helvetia Open	2019
Players Championships
2024 PC11
Medal record
Men's Darts
Representing Scotland
WDF World Cup
Gold medal – first place	2013 St. John's	Men's team
Silver medal – second place	2013 St. John's	Men's overall
WDF Europe Cup
Silver medal – second place	2016 Egmond aan Zee	Men's pairs
Bronze medal – third place	2014 Bucharest	Men's pairs
Bronze medal – third place	2016 Egmond aan Zee	Men's overall
Bronze medal – third place	2018 Budapest	Men's singles
Bronze medal – third place	2018 Budapest	Men's pairs

Alan Soutar (born 10 January 1978) is a Scottish professional darts player who competes in Professional Darts Corporation (PDC) events. A PDC Tour Card holder since 2021, Soutar won his first PDC title at 2024 Players Championship 11. He reached his first major quarter-final at the 2022 Grand Slam. His best World Championship performance is reaching the last 16 in consecutive years: 2022 and 2023.

Soutar previously participated in British Darts Organisation (BDO) tournaments, twice reaching the last 16 at the World Masters in 2016 and 2017.

== Career ==
Soutar started playing darts as a teenager in the pub his grandparents ran. He plays in a saltire shirt and tartan pants, in tribute to his Scottish heritage.

=== BDO ===
In November 2011 Soutar won the Bellrock Open. He qualified for the 2011 BDO World Darts Championship, he played Willy van de Wiel in the first round and lost 3–1 in sets. In 2013 he won the 2013 WDF World Cup as part of Team Scotland. He qualified for the 2016 BDO World Darts Championship through the Hull qualifiers before losing to Craig Caldwell in the preliminary round.

=== PDC ===
In February 2021, Soutar secured a two-year PDC Tour Card at UK Qualifying School. He made his televised PDC debut with a first round defeat of Raymond van Barneveld in the 2021 UK Open before falling to Dave Chisnall in the last 16.

In December 2021, Soutar made his debut at the PDC World Championship, where he defeated Diogo Portela in the first round in the deciding set. In the following two rounds, Soutar knocked out two seeds, Mensur Suljović and José de Sousa, each time in the deciding set having survived match darts from his opponent. Soutar's run to the last 16 was finally ended by Callan Rydz in a 1–4 defeat.

In 2022, Soutar made his debut as a qualifier for the Grand Slam of Darts, where he advanced from his group ahead of reigning World Champion Peter Wright after victories over Fallon Sherrock and Nathan Aspinall. In the round of 16, Soutar defeated ninth-ranked Jonny Clayton to reach the quarter final where he was defeated by eventual runner-up Nathan Aspinall. At the 2023 PDC World Darts Championship, Soutar reached the fourth round again after whitewashing Mal Cuming and Daryl Gurney 3–0 in sets. His run proceeded with a win over Danny Noppert before being defeated by Gabriel Clemens.

In June 2024, Soutar won a first PDC title at PC11 in Hildesheim, defeating Daryl Gurney in the final.

== Personal life ==
Soutar joined the Army Cadet Force at the age of 13 and spent nine years as a commando in the British Army, during which he was deployed to Kosovo, Bosnia and Herzegovina and Northern Ireland.

Away from darts, Soutar is a firefighter and trains guide dogs in his home with partner Amanda. He took part in the 2026 London Marathon in support of Guide Dogs UK, completing the race in four hours and seventeen minutes. Soutar is a keen supporter of his local football team Arbroath F.C. In 2012, he set up the Angus Darts Academy, training children in how to play darts. He won the "Sporting Volunteer of the Year" award at the Finding Scotland's Real Heroes award in 2013 for his mentorship in darts.

== World Championship results ==
=== BDO ===
- 2011: First round (lost to Willy van de Wiel 1–3)
- 2016: Preliminary round (lost to Craig Caldwell 1–3)

=== PDC ===
- 2022: Fourth round (lost to Callan Rydz 1–4)
- 2023: Fourth round (lost to Gabriel Clemens 1–4)
- 2025: First round (lost to Kai Gotthardt 1–3)
- 2026: Second round (lost to Gian van Veen 1–3)

== Performance timeline ==
=== BDO ===
Tournament	2008	2009	2010	2011	2012	2013	2014	2015	2016	2017	2018
BDO World Championship	DNP/DNQ			1R	Did not qualify				Prel.	DNQ	
World Masters	4R	DNP			3R	2R	1R	4R	6R	6R	1R
Career statistics
Year-end ranking (BDO)	47	71	137	805	332	127	473	1290	140	221	171

=== PDC ===
Tournament	2021	2022	2023	2024	2025	2026
PDC Ranked televised events
World Championship	DNQ	4R	4R	DNQ	1R	2R
World Masters (Note: A non-ranked event until 2025)	Did not qualify				Prel.	Prel.
UK Open	6R	3R	4R	3R	5R	3R
Grand Slam	DNQ	QF	Did not qualify			RR
Players Championship Finals	1R	1R	DNQ	1R	1R	
Career statistics
Season-end ranking (PDC)	51	32	45	57	53	

==== European Tour ====
Season	1	2	3	4	5	6	7	8	9	10	11	12	13	14	15
2021	HDT; 2R	GDT; DNQ													
2022	IDO; DNQ	GDC; 2R	GDG; 1R	Did not qualify							GDO; 2R	BDO; 1R	GDT; DNQ		
2023	BSD; DNQ	EDO; DNQ	IDO; 3R	GDG; 1R	ADO; DNQ	DDC; 1R	BDO; DNQ	CDO; DNQ	EDG; 1R	EDM; DNQ	GDO; 1R	HDT; DNQ	GDC; 2R		
2024	BDO; DNQ	GDG; 1R	Did not qualify							FDT; 2R	HDT; 1R	SDT; DNQ	CDO; 3R		
2025	BDO; DNQ	EDT; 1R	Did not qualify					EDO; 1R	Did not qualify						
2026	Did not qualify					ADO; 2R	IDO; DNQ	BDO; 1R	Did not qualify					SDT; 1R	DDC; DNQ

==== Players Championships ====
Season	1	2	3	4	5	6	7	8	9	10	11	12	13	14	15	16	17	18	19	20	21	22	23	24	25	26	27	28	29	30	31	32	33	34
2021	BOL; 3R	BOL; 3R	BOL; QF	BOL; 2R	MIL; SF	MIL; 3R	MIL; 2R	MIL; 2R	NIE; 2R	NIE; 2R	NIE; 1R	NIE; 3R	MIL; 1R	MIL; 1R	MIL; 3R	MIL; 1R	COV; 2R	COV; 1R	COV; 2R	COV; 2R	BAR; 1R	BAR; 3R	BAR; 3R	BAR; 2R	BAR; 2R	BAR; 1R	BAR; 1R	BAR; QF	BAR; 2R	BAR; 2R				
2022	BAR; 2R	BAR; 1R	WIG; 4R	WIG; 2R	BAR; 1R	BAR; 1R	NIE; 1R	NIE; 2R	BAR; 1R	BAR; 1R	BAR; 2R	BAR; 2R	BAR; 1R	WIG; 2R	WIG; SF	NIE; 1R	NIE; 1R	BAR; 1R	BAR; 1R	BAR; 3R	BAR; 2R	BAR; 1R	BAR; QF	BAR; 1R	BAR; 2R	BAR; QF	BAR; QF	BAR; 2R	BAR; 4R	BAR; 1R				
2023	BAR; 2R	BAR; 1R	BAR; 1R	BAR; 1R	BAR; 1R	BAR; 1R	HIL; 1R	HIL; 2R	WIG; 2R	WIG; 2R	LEI; 1R	LEI; 1R	HIL; 3R	HIL; 2R	LEI; 2R	LEI; 1R	HIL; 1R	HIL; 2R	BAR; 1R	BAR; 1R	BAR; 2R	BAR; 1R	BAR; 1R	BAR; 1R	BAR; 1R	BAR; 2R	BAR; 3R	BAR; 1R	BAR; 2R	BAR; 1R				
2024	WIG; SF	WIG; 1R	LEI; 1R	LEI; 2R	HIL; 2R	HIL; 1R	LEI; 1R	LEI; 2R	HIL; 2R	HIL; 2R	HIL; W	HIL; 3R	MIL; 1R	MIL; 3R	MIL; 4R	MIL; 2R	MIL; 3R	MIL; 1R	MIL; 3R	WIG; 2R	WIG; 1R	LEI; 4R	LEI; 3R	WIG; 1R	WIG; 1R	WIG; 1R	WIG; 1R	WIG; 1R	LEI; 1R	LEI; 1R				
2025	WIG; 3R	WIG; 1R	ROS; 1R	ROS; 2R	LEI; 1R	LEI; 1R	HIL; 3R	HIL; 2R	LEI; 2R	LEI; 1R	LEI; 3R	LEI; 4R	ROS; 3R	ROS; 1R	HIL; 2R	HIL; 2R	LEI; 2R	LEI; 4R	LEI; QF	LEI; 1R	LEI; 1R	HIL; 3R	HIL; 2R	MIL; QF	MIL; QF	HIL; 1R	HIL; 1R	LEI; 2R	LEI; 1R	LEI; 1R	WIG; 2R	WIG; 1R	WIG; 3R	WIG; 1R
2026	HIL; 2R	HIL; 3R	WIG; 1R	WIG; 4R	LEI; QF	LEI; 4R	LEI; F	LEI; 1R	WIG; 1R	WIG; 1R	MIL; 3R	MIL; 2R	HIL; 1R	HIL; 1R	LEI; 2R	LEI; 1R	LEI; 1R	LEI; 1R	MIL; 1R	MIL; 1R	WIG; 1R	WIG; 2R	LEI; 1R	LEI; 1R	HIL; 1R	HIL; 1R	LEI; 2R	LEI; 1R	ROS; 1R	ROS; 2R	ROS; QF	ROS; 2R	LEI; 1R	LEI; 2R

Performance Table Legend
W	Won the tournament	F	Finalist	SF	Semifinalist	QF	Quarterfinalist	#R; RR; Prel.	Lost in # round Round-robin; Preliminary round	DQ	Disqualified
DNQ	Did not qualify	DNP	Did not participate	WD	Withdrew	NH	Tournament not held	#R; RR; Prel.	Lost in # round Round-robin; Preliminary round	NYF	Not yet founded
