= 2021 European Championship (darts) =

2021 Cazoo European Championship

Tournament information
- Dates: 14–17 October 2021
- Venue: Salzburgarena
- Location: Salzburg
- Country: Austria
- Organisation(s): PDC
- Format: Legs
- Prize fund: £500,000
- Winner's share: £120,000
- High checkout: 170 Danny Noppert (second round)

Champion(s)
- Rob Cross

The 2021 Cazoo European Championship was the fourteenth edition of the Professional Darts Corporation's European Championship tournament, which saw the top players from the two European tour events compete against each other. The tournament took place from 14 to 17 October 2021 at the Salzburgarena in Salzburg, Austria.

Peter Wright was the defending champion, having won the tournament for the first time with an 11–4 win over James Wade in the 2020 final. However, he became the third consecutive defending champion to be eliminated in the first round after losing 6–3 to Florian Hempel.

Rob Cross won his second European Championship title after defeating Michael van Gerwen 11–8 in a repeat of the 2017 final.

In the quarter-finals, Gerwyn Price's average of 107.56 against van Gerwen became the highest ever losing average at a European Championship.

== Prize money ==
The 2021 European Championship had a total prize fund of £500,000, the same as its previous edition.

The following is the breakdown of the fund:

Position (no. of players)		Prize money (Total: £500,000)
Winner	(1)	£120,000
Runner-up	(1)	£60,000
Semi-finalists	(2)	£32,000
Quarter-finalists	(4)	£20,000
Last 16 (second round)	(8)	£10,000
Last 32 (first round)	(16)	£6,000

== Qualification ==
The 2021 tournament continued the new qualification system used in the three previous editions: the top 32 players from the European Tour Order of Merit qualified for the tournament. The Order of Merit is solely based on prize money won in the two European tour events during the season.

As with the previous tournaments, players were drawn in a fixed bracket by their seeded order with the top qualifier playing the 32nd, the second playing the 31st, and so on.

The following players qualified for the tournament:

1. Gerwyn Price (quarter-finals)
2. Mensur Suljović (quarter-finals)
3. Brendan Dolan (second round)
4. Michael Smith (first round)
5. Nathan Aspinall (semi-finals)
6. José de Sousa (quarter-finals)
7. Simon Whitlock (first round)
8. Michael van Gerwen (runner-up)
9. James Wade (second round)
10. Joe Cullen (semi-finals)
11. Luke Humphries (second round)
12. Damon Heta (second round)
13. Krzysztof Ratajski (first round)
14. Rob Cross (champion)
15. Peter Wright (first round)
16. Adam Gawlas (second round)
17. Joe Murnan (first round)
18. Florian Hempel (second round)
19. Keane Barry (first round)
20. Danny Noppert (quarter-finals)
21. Gabriel Clemens (first round)
22. Callan Rydz (first round)
23. Ted Evetts (first round)
24. Adam Smith-Neale (first round)
25. Boris Krčmar (first round)
26. William Borland (second round)
27. Lewy Williams (first round)
28. Mervyn King (first round)
29. Ryan Searle (second round)
30. Kim Huybrechts (first round)
31. Adam Hunt (first round)
32. Ritchie Edhouse (first round)

== Draw ==
First round (best of 11 legs); 14–15 October
1	Gerwyn Price 104.53	6
32	Ritchie Edhouse 86.97	2
16	Adam Gawlas 88.75	6
17	Joe Murnan 87.21	4
8	Michael van Gerwen 100.45	6
25	Boris Krčmar 92.78	2
9	James Wade 92.93	6
24	Adam Smith-Neale 87.42	5
4	Michael Smith 101.98	5
29	Ryan Searle 101.90	6
13	Krzysztof Ratajski 94.30	2
20	Danny Noppert 102.31	6
5	Nathan Aspinall 90.67	6
28	Mervyn King 95.20	4
12	Damon Heta 94.12	6
21	Gabriel Clemens 96.07	3
2	Mensur Suljović 90.76	6
31	Adam Hunt 88.22	2
15	Peter Wright 92.13	3
18	Florian Hempel 86.94	6
7	Simon Whitlock 87.77	3
26	William Borland 87.78	6
10	Joe Cullen 94.93	6
23	Ted Evetts 85.84	0
3	Brendan Dolan 95.95	6
30	Kim Huybrechts 92.47	2
14	Rob Cross 84.50	6
19	Keane Barry 85.66	3
6	José de Sousa 89.73	6
27	Lewy Williams 94.51	4
11	Luke Humphries 94.36	6
22	Callan Rydz 87.73	5

Second round (best of 19 legs); 16 October
1	Gerwyn Price 102.96	10
16	Adam Gawlas 86.92	3
8	Michael van Gerwen 98.15	10
9	James Wade 97.02	4
29	Ryan Searle 101.03	4
20	Danny Noppert 101.21	10
5	Nathan Aspinall 100.96	10
12	Damon Heta 101.66	6
2	Mensur Suljović 93.00	10
18	Florian Hempel 91.26	9
26	William Borland 87.89	5
10	Joe Cullen 89.24	10
3	Brendan Dolan 93.56	4
14	Rob Cross 97.61	10
6	José de Sousa 95.33	10
11	Luke Humphries 99.08	8

Quarter-finals (best of 19 legs); 17 October
1	Gerwyn Price 107.56	8
8	Michael van Gerwen 107.74	10
20	Danny Noppert 99.97	9
5	Nathan Aspinall 103.34	10
2	Mensur Suljović 90.11	7
10	Joe Cullen 95.39	10
14	Rob Cross 93.91	10
6	José de Sousa 94.70	5

Semi-finals (best of 21 legs); 17 October
8	Michael van Gerwen 103.41	11
5	Nathan Aspinall 102.29	10
10	Joe Cullen 87.32	3
14	Rob Cross 96.74	11

Final (best of 21 legs); 17 October
8	Michael van Gerwen 93.66	8
14	Rob Cross 92.91	11
