= 2021 PDC Players Championship series =

2021 Darts tournament series

The 2021 PDC Players Championship series consisted of 30 darts tournaments on the 2021 PDC Pro Tour. As with the second half of 2020, the events were grouped into Super Series events, with 8 events taking place throughout the year.

The Top 64 on the Players Championship Order of Merit qualified for the 2021 Players Championship Finals.

== Prize money ==
The prize money for the Players Championship events remained at 2020 levels, with each event having a prize fund of £75,000.

This is how the prize money was divided:

Stage (no. of players)		Prize money (Total: £75,000)
Winner	(1)	£10,000
Runner-up	(1)	£6,000
Semi-finalists	(2)	£3,000
Quarter-finalists	(4)	£2,250
Fourth round	(8)	£1,500
Third round	(16)	£1,000
Second round	(32)	£500
First round	(64)	N/A

== February (Super Series 1) ==
=== Players Championship 1 ===
Players Championship 1 was contested on Thursday 25 February 2021 at the Bolton Whites Hotel. Michael Smith hit a nine-dart finish against Geert De Vos. The tournament was won by Joe Cullen, who defeated Jonny Clayton 8–7 in the final.

Quarter-finals (best of 11 legs)
16	Rob Cross 94.94	5
8	Nathan Aspinall 96.15	6
4	Joe Cullen 98.04	6
28	Gabriel Clemens 96.77	4
18	Jonny Clayton 99.49	6
7	James Wade 89.97	2
Jonathan Worsley 95.88	6
6	Michael Smith 103.48	5

Semi-finals (best of 13 legs)
8	Nathan Aspinall 92.45	4
4	Joe Cullen 94.95	7
18	Jonny Clayton 109.59	7
Jonathan Worsley 85.17	0

Final (best of 15 legs)
4	Joe Cullen 86.52	8
18	Jonny Clayton 92.83	7

=== Players Championship 2 ===
Players Championship 2 was contested on Friday 26 February 2021 at the Bolton Whites Hotel. Adrian Lewis hit a nine-dart finish against Jeff Smith. The tournament was won by Callan Rydz, who defeated Jonny Clayton 8–7 in the final.

Quarter-finals (best of 11 legs)
John Michael 83.94	4
8	Nathan Aspinall 87.20	6
Callan Rydz 93.70	6
12	Ian White 91.68	1
Steve Beaton 97.13	3
26	Vincent van der Voort 95.80	6
14	Jonny Clayton 101.27	6
11	Mensur Suljović 98.23	3

Semi-finals (best of 13 legs)
8	Nathan Aspinall 87.92	2
Callan Rydz 92.89	7
26	Vincent van der Voort 84.99	5
14	Jonny Clayton 90.87	7

Final (best of 15 legs)
Callan Rydz 98.34	8
14	Jonny Clayton 97.03	7

=== Players Championship 3 ===
Players Championship 3 was contested on Saturday 27 February 2021 at the Bolton Whites Hotel. Mensur Suljović hit a nine-dart finish against Peter Hudson. The tournament was won by Raymond van Barneveld, who defeated Joe Cullen 8–6 in the final.

Quarter-finals (best of 11 legs)
1	Joe Cullen 104.94	6
9	Krzysztof Ratajski 97.35	2
13	Jonny Clayton 103.01	4
12	Danny Noppert 96.66	6
Raymond van Barneveld 98.64	6
Alan Soutar 91.31	2
19	Glen Durrant 86.31	1
11	Ian White 96.64	6

Semi-finals (best of 13 legs)
1	Joe Cullen 95.71	7
12	Danny Noppert 94.20	3
Raymond van Barneveld 100.50	7
11	Ian White 97.72	3

Final (best of 15 legs)
1	Joe Cullen 95.52	6
Raymond van Barneveld 94.41	8

=== Players Championship 4 ===
Players Championship 4 was contested on Sunday 28 February 2021 at the Bolton Whites Hotel. Luke Woodhouse hit a nine-dart finish against Danny Noppert. The tournament was won by Jonny Clayton, who defeated Damon Heta 8–6 in the final.

Quarter-finals (best of 11 legs)
17	Daryl Gurney 92.86	4
25	Gabriel Clemens 97.73	6
13	Jonny Clayton 98.51	6
5	Michael Smith 91.53	3
2	Michael van Gerwen 100.49	6
26	Madars Razma 102.38	2
14	Damon Heta 97.34	6
22	Dirk van Duijvenbode 96.23	3

Semi-finals (best of 13 legs)
25	Gabriel Clemens 88.81	5
13	Jonny Clayton 92.35	7
2	Michael van Gerwen 95.45	3
14	Damon Heta 100.48	7

Final (best of 15 legs)
13	Jonny Clayton 97.72	8
14	Damon Heta 96.37	6

== March (Super Series 2) ==
=== Players Championship 5 ===
Players Championship 5 was contested on Tuesday 16 March 2021 at the Marshall Arena in Milton Keynes. Ritchie Edhouse hit a nine-dart finish against William Borland, whilst Wayne Jones also did the same against Gerwyn Price. The tournament was won by Brendan Dolan, who defeated Michael Smith 8–7 in the final.

Quarter-finals (best of 11 legs)
1	Joe Cullen 105.07	6
25	Ryan Joyce 98.60	4
29	Brendan Dolan 109.54	6
Scott Mitchell 106.79	3
Ryan Searle 86.22	2
7	Michael Smith 96.77	6
Alan Soutar 96.90	6
27	Dirk van Duijvenbode 96.91	5

Semi-finals (best of 13 legs)
1	Joe Cullen 90.58	4
29	Brendan Dolan 98.50	7
7	Michael Smith 99.74	7
Alan Soutar 88.23	6

Final (best of 15 legs)
29	Brendan Dolan 97.73	8
7	Michael Smith 93.80	7

=== Players Championship 6 ===
Players Championship 6 was contested on Wednesday 17 March 2021 at the Marshall Arena in Milton Keynes. The tournament was won by Gerwyn Price, who defeated Luke Humphries 8–5 in the final.

Quarter-finals (best of 11 legs)
17	Brendan Dolan 87.87	6
8	James Wade 86.66	3
4	Michael Smith 96.80	3
5	Gerwyn Price 104.04	6
Niels Zonneveld 94.19	4
Jamie Hughes 99.19	6
Luke Humphries 90.96	6
27	Dirk van Duijvenbode 87.76	2

Semi-finals (best of 13 legs)
17	Brendan Dolan 104.82	6
5	Gerwyn Price 106.82	7
Jamie Hughes 97.07	6
Luke Humphries 97.03	7

Final (best of 15 legs)
5	Gerwyn Price 102.25	8
Luke Humphries 97.08	5

=== Players Championship 7 ===
Players Championship 7 was contested on Thursday 18 March 2021 at the Marshall Arena in Milton Keynes. The tournament was won by Jonny Clayton, who defeated James Wade 8–5 in the final.

Quarter-finals (best of 11 legs)
32	Darius Labanauskas 100.96	4
8	James Wade 97.60	6
Chas Barstow 98.74	3
21	Gabriel Clemens 102.76	6
2	José de Sousa 103.92	4
7	Jonny Clayton 103.36	6
Jason Heaver 96.95	6
22	Vincent van der Voort 88.52	4

Semi-finals (best of 13 legs)
8	James Wade 88.68	7
21	Gabriel Clemens 95.57	5
7	Jonny Clayton 100.20	7
Jason Heaver 93.94	0

Final (best of 15 legs)
8	James Wade 98.58	5
7	Jonny Clayton 101.42	8

=== Players Championship 8 ===
Players Championship 8 was contested on Friday 19 March 2021 at the Marshall Arena in Milton Keynes. Mickey Mansell hit a nine-dart finish against Jamie Hughes. The tournament was won by Peter Wright, who defeated Gerwyn Price 8–3 in the final.

Quarter-finals (best of 11 legs)
1	Joe Cullen 101.32	6
9	Krzysztof Ratajski 95.25	3
4	Peter Wright 108.33	6
Steve Lennon 94.79	4
15	Brendan Dolan 105.90	6
Martin Schindler 98.80	4
3	Gerwyn Price 107.40	6
Jason Lowe 94.56	2

Semi-finals (best of 13 legs)
1	Joe Cullen 94.86	2
4	Peter Wright 103.63	7
15	Brendan Dolan 93.68	2
3	Gerwyn Price 101.70	7

Final (best of 15 legs)
4	Peter Wright 101.96	8
3	Gerwyn Price 94.17	3

== April (Super Series 3) ==
=== Players Championship 9 ===
Players Championship 9 was contested on Saturday 24 April 2021 at the H+ Hotel in Niedernhausen. Nathan Aspinall hit a nine-dart finish against Andy Boulton. The tournament was won by José de Sousa, who defeated Luke Humphries 8–1 in the final.

Quarter-finals (best of 11 legs)
Dimitri Van den Bergh 111.33	6
24	Jamie Hughes 96.23	0
29	Luke Humphries 99.88	6
Jason Lowe 96.38	4
2	José de Sousa 111.06	6
10	Brendan Dolan 99.15	2
Alan Tabern 89.84	5
Krzysztof Kciuk 99.41	6

Semi-finals (best of 13 legs)
Dimitri Van den Bergh 96.64	6
29	Luke Humphries 96.45	7
2	José de Sousa 103.55	7
Krzysztof Kciuk 91.76	2

Final (best of 15 legs)
29	Luke Humphries 93.66	1
2	José de Sousa 114.08	8

=== Players Championship 10 ===
Players Championship 10 was contested on Sunday 25 April 2021 at the H+ Hotel in Niedernhausen. Stephen Bunting and José de Sousa hit nine-dart finishes against Ron Meulenkamp and Jermaine Wattimena respectively. The tournament was won by Michael Smith, who defeated Ross Smith 8–5 in the final.

Quarter-finals (best of 11 legs)
1	José de Sousa 95.84	3
24	Ross Smith 98.02	6
Berry van Peer 93.83	6
28	Steve Lennon 95.52	3
Aaron Beeney 86.54	6
Raymond van Barneveld 84.52	2
3	Michael Smith 105.12	6
Martin Schindler 91.21	3

Semi-finals (best of 13 legs)
24	Ross Smith 98.26	7
Berry van Peer 84.54	2
Aaron Beeney 84.88	4
3	Michael Smith 92.95	7

Final (best of 15 legs)
24	Ross Smith 90.07	5
3	Michael Smith 96.95	8

=== Players Championship 11 ===
Players Championship 11 was contested on Monday 26 April 2021 at the H+ Hotel in Niedernhausen. The tournament was won by Dirk van Duijvenbode, who defeated Martijn Kleermaker 8–6 in the final.

Quarter-finals (best of 11 legs)
Andy Boulton 96.46	6
9	Damon Heta 96.23	5
Scott Mitchell 95.70	4
21	Dirk van Duijvenbode 92.58	6
15	Rob Cross 90.96	5
10	Brendan Dolan 93.29	6
Martijn Kleermaker 88.56	6
Ritchie Edhouse 96.15	5

Semi-finals (best of 13 legs)
Andy Boulton 91.16	5
21	Dirk van Duijvenbode 95.73	7
10	Brendan Dolan 95.98	5
Martijn Kleermaker 89.46	7

Final (best of 15 legs)
21	Dirk van Duijvenbode 92.45	8
Martijn Kleermaker 92.25	6

=== Players Championship 12 ===
Players Championship 12 was contested on Tuesday 27 April 2021 at the H+ Hotel in Niedernhausen. Krzysztof Ratajski hit a nine-dart finish against Keane Barry. The tournament was won by Dimitri Van den Bergh, who defeated Dirk van Duijvenbode 8–7 in the final.

Quarter-finals (best of 11 legs)
16	Daryl Gurney 96.52	4
9	Danny Noppert 90.17	6
Scott Mitchell 91.86	5
Dimitri Van den Bergh 97.12	6
2	Michael Smith 91.18	3
Robert Thornton 88.34	6
Simon Whitlock 90.17	0
11	Dirk van Duijvenbode 101.33	6

Semi-finals (best of 13 legs)
9	Danny Noppert 78.99	2
Dimitri Van den Bergh 89.10	7
Robert Thornton 92.17	4
11	Dirk van Duijvenbode 98.72	7

Final (best of 15 legs)
Dimitri Van den Bergh 95.89	8
11	Dirk van Duijvenbode 92.93	7

== June (Super Series 4) ==
=== Players Championship 13 ===
Players Championship 13 was contested on Monday 14 June 2021 at the Marshall Arena in Milton Keynes. Niels Zonneveld hit a nine-dart finish against James Wade. The tournament was won by Joe Cullen, who defeated Gerwyn Price 8–6 in the final.

Quarter-finals (best of 11 legs)
1	Joe Cullen 93.15	6
8	James Wade 88.76	4
29	Martijn Kleermaker 92.80	1
5	Michael van Gerwen 107.78	6
15	Dirk van Duijvenbode 97.19	4
7	Jonny Clayton 105.15	6
Gary Anderson 90.44	5
6	Gerwyn Price 95.72	6

Semi-finals (best of 13 legs)
1	Joe Cullen 93.72	7
5	Michael van Gerwen 91.77	2
7	Jonny Clayton 99.37	1
6	Gerwyn Price 104.42	7

Final (best of 15 legs)
1	Joe Cullen 93.81	8
6	Gerwyn Price 90.36	6

=== Players Championship 14 ===
Players Championship 14 was contested on Tuesday 15 June 2021 at the Marshall Arena in Milton Keynes. Jim McEwan and Geert Nentjes hit nine-dart finishes against Raymond van Barneveld and Kirk Shepherd respectively. The tournament was won by José de Sousa, who defeated Michael van Gerwen 8–6 in the final.

Quarter-finals (best of 11 legs)
1	Joe Cullen 100.07	4
Gary Anderson 106.09	6
4	Michael van Gerwen 97.20	6
Ted Evetts 96.30	4
2	José de Sousa 105.52	6
26	Dimitri Van den Bergh 95.06	1
19	Gabriel Clemens 97.11	6
Ritchie Edhouse 95.37	4

Semi-finals (best of 13 legs)
Gary Anderson 88.67	2
4	Michael van Gerwen 106.29	7
2	José de Sousa 100.70	7
19	Gabriel Clemens 94.02	5

Final (best of 15 legs)
4	Michael van Gerwen 94.99	6
2	José de Sousa 100.57	8

=== Players Championship 15 ===
Players Championship 15 was contested on Wednesday 16 June 2021 at the Marshall Arena in Milton Keynes. Ian White hit a nine-dart finish against Ron Meulenkamp. The tournament was won by José de Sousa, who defeated Ryan Searle 8–7 in the final.

Quarter-finals (best of 11 legs)
32	Ryan Searle 93.59	6
Boris Krčmar 89.60	2
Adrian Lewis 102.90	2
Stephen Bunting 92.45	6
2	José de Sousa 98.94	6
7	Jonny Clayton 101.92	5
19	Rob Cross 96.10	6
6	Peter Wright 97.91	5

Semi-finals (best of 13 legs)
32	Ryan Searle 99.87	7
Stephen Bunting 95.14	4
2	José de Sousa 112.07	7
19	Rob Cross 100.76	2

Final (best of 15 legs)
32	Ryan Searle 94.21	7
2	José de Sousa 96.60	8

=== Players Championship 16 ===
Players Championship 16 was contested on Thursday 17 June 2021 at the Marshall Arena in Milton Keynes. The tournament was won by Peter Wright, who defeated Luke Humphries 8–4 in the final.

Quarter-finals (best of 11 legs)
Adrian Lewis 99.16	3
25	Callan Rydz 102.58	6
13	Rob Cross 100.84	1
5	Peter Wright 103.41	6
Steve Beaton 96.67	5
26	Luke Humphries 91.26	6
3	Gerwyn Price 99.76	3
11	Dirk van Duijvenbode 100.77	6

Semi-finals (best of 13 legs)
25	Callan Rydz 96.61	0
5	Peter Wright 106.27	7
26	Luke Humphries 88.91	7
11	Dirk van Duijvenbode 89.14	3

Final (best of 15 legs)
5	Peter Wright 108.94	8
26	Luke Humphries 94.29	4

== July (Super Series 5) ==
=== Players Championship 17 ===
Players Championship 17 was contested on Monday 5 July 2021 at the Coventry Building Society Arena in Coventry. The tournament was won by Stephen Bunting, who defeated Dimitri Van den Bergh 8–4 in the final.

Quarter-finals (best of 11 legs)
32	Stephen Bunting 103.89	6
Raymond van Barneveld 92.92	2
4	Michael van Gerwen 109.06	5
5	Gerwyn Price 100.09	6
2	José de Sousa 100.99	6
23	Mervyn King 97.15	3
14	Brendan Dolan 93.56	3
27	Dimitri Van den Bergh 103.72	6

Semi-finals (best of 13 legs)
32	Stephen Bunting 94.55	7
5	Gerwyn Price 93.13	5
2	José de Sousa 98.05	4
27	Dimitri Van den Bergh 103.31	7

Final (best of 15 legs)
32	Stephen Bunting 95.24	8
27	Dimitri Van den Bergh 92.60	4

=== Players Championship 18 ===
Players Championship 18 was contested on Tuesday 6 July 2021 at the Coventry Building Society Arena in Coventry. Danny Noppert and Martin Atkins hit nine-dart finishes against each other. The tournament was won by Chris Dobey, who defeated José de Sousa 8–7 in the final.

Quarter-finals (best of 11 legs)
1	José de Sousa 103.63	6
24	Mervyn King 99.19	1
29	Ryan Searle 111.33	6
Boris Krčmar 89.36	0
18	Stephen Bunting 102.00	5
Chris Dobey 105.64	6
Maik Kuivenhoven 95.39	6
Scott Mitchell 93.81	5

Semi-finals (best of 13 legs)
1	José de Sousa 94.92	7
29	Ryan Searle 91.03	6
Chris Dobey 107.33	7
Maik Kuivenhoven 99.60	6

Final (best of 15 legs)
1	José de Sousa 104.32	7
Chris Dobey 97.06	8

=== Players Championship 19 ===
Players Championship 19 was contested on Wednesday 7 July 2021 at the Coventry Building Society Arena in Coventry. Dimitri Van den Bergh hit a nine-dart finish against Jonny Clayton. The tournament was won by Ross Smith, who defeated Brendan Dolan 8–4 in the final.

Quarter-finals (best of 11 legs)
32	Ryan Joyce 99.36	6
Keegan Brown 93.45	3
Gary Anderson 94.45	1
28	Ross Smith 101.97	6
15	Nathan Aspinall 88.39	2
23	Dimitri Van den Bergh 93.14	6
14	Brendan Dolan 109.19	6
6	Michael Smith 107.01	2

Semi-finals (best of 13 legs)
32	Ryan Joyce 97.30	2
28	Ross Smith 100.19	7
23	Dimitri Van den Bergh 94.79	2
14	Brendan Dolan 99.14	7

Final (best of 15 legs)
28	Ross Smith 91.48	8
14	Brendan Dolan 90.48	4

=== Players Championship 20 ===
Players Championship 20 was contested on Thursday 8 July 2021 at the Coventry Building Society Arena in Coventry. Gabriel Clemens and Kim Huybrechts hit nine-dart finishes against Jelle Klaasen and Dirk van Duijvenbode respectively. The tournament was won by Peter Wright, who defeated Michael van Gerwen 8–2 in the final.

Quarter-finals (best of 11 legs)
1	José de Sousa 106.72	6
Chas Barstow 96.27	3
4	Michael Smith 95.51	5
5	Michael van Gerwen 102.41	6
2	Gerwyn Price 94.16	3
7	James Wade 90.31	6
3	Peter Wright 98.19	6
11	Danny Noppert 86.62	3

Semi-finals (best of 13 legs)
1	José de Sousa 96.22	2
5	Michael van Gerwen 99.07	7
7	James Wade 85.71	2
3	Peter Wright 102.17	7

Final (best of 15 legs)
5	Michael van Gerwen 106.27	2
3	Peter Wright 108.84	8

== August (Super Series 6) ==
=== Players Championship 21 ===
Players Championship 21 was contested on Monday 2 August 2021 at the Barnsley Metrodome in Barnsley. The tournament was won by Gerwyn Price, who defeated Damon Heta 8–7 in the final.

Quarter-finals (best of 11 legs)
Lewy Williams 97.04	5
25	Ian White 98.89	6
4	Gerwyn Price 99.61	6
28	Callan Rydz 96.69	5
Ritchie Edhouse 90.02	3
10	Damon Heta 91.88	6
14	Krzysztof Ratajski 96.37	6
22	Rob Cross 98.32	3

Semi-finals (best of 13 legs)
25	Ian White 100.61	3
4	Gerwyn Price 112.51	7
10	Damon Heta 101.16	7
14	Krzysztof Ratajski 93.43	2

Final (best of 15 legs)
4	Gerwyn Price 107.82	8
10	Damon Heta 95.65	7

=== Players Championship 22 ===
Players Championship 22 was contested on Tuesday 3 August 2021 at the Barnsley Metrodome in Barnsley. The tournament was won by Ryan Searle, who defeated Peter Wright 8–7 in the final.

Quarter-finals (best of 11 legs)
17	Dimitri Van den Bergh 93.74	6
24	Vincent van der Voort 88.96	3
Martin Schindler 103.80	4
5	Peter Wright 109.63	6
Keane Barry 86.84	5
Martin Lukeman 87.12	6
Luke Woodhouse 85.98	1
27	Ryan Searle 100.44	6

Semi-finals (best of 13 legs)
17	Dimitri Van den Bergh 100.73	4
5	Peter Wright 99.23	7
Martin Lukeman 84.93	0
27	Ryan Searle 116.90	7

Final (best of 15 legs)
5	Peter Wright 102.59	7
27	Ryan Searle 94.96	8

=== Players Championship 23 ===
Players Championship 23 was contested on Wednesday 4 August 2021 at the Barnsley Metrodome in Barnsley. The tournament was won by Peter Wright, who defeated Jonny Clayton 8–7 in the final.

Quarter-finals (best of 11 legs)
32	Jamie Hughes 86.82	6
25	Daryl Gurney 85.24	5
4	Peter Wright 100.55	6
Martin Schindler 95.85	3
18	Luke Humphries 81.38	3
10	James Wade 86.13	6
14	Ryan Searle 95.60	2
6	Jonny Clayton 102.86	6

Semi-finals (best of 13 legs)
32	Jamie Hughes 88.40	5
4	Peter Wright 95.44	7
10	James Wade 90.41	2
6	Jonny Clayton 103.63	7

Final (best of 15 legs)
4	Peter Wright 97.58	8
6	Jonny Clayton 96.26	7

== October (Super Series 7) ==
=== Players Championship 24 ===
Players Championship 24 was contested on Tuesday 19 October 2021 at the Barnsley Metrodome in Barnsley. Nathan Aspinall and Callan Rydz hit nine-dart finishes against Keegan Brown and Adrian Lewis respectively. The tournament was won by Dimitri Van den Bergh, who defeated Adrian Lewis 8–5 in the final.

Quarter-finals (best of 11 legs)
Kim Huybrechts 91.86	6
Mickey Mansell 93.45	3
13	Dimitri Van den Bergh 109.81	6
21	Rob Cross 103.04	2
15	Krzysztof Ratajski 99.21	5
26	Dave Chisnall 99.30	6
30	Adrian Lewis 93.98	6
11	Ryan Searle 86.53	2

Semi-finals (best of 13 legs)
Kim Huybrechts 102.78	4
13	Dimitri Van den Bergh 104.37	7
26	Dave Chisnall 93.99	2
30	Adrian Lewis 100.30	7

Final (best of 15 legs)
13	Dimitri Van den Bergh 100.60	8
30	Adrian Lewis 95.85	5

=== Players Championship 25 ===
Players Championship 25 was contested on Wednesday 20 October 2021 at the Barnsley Metrodome in Barnsley. The tournament was won by Callan Rydz, who defeated Gabriel Clemens 8–6 in the final.

Quarter-finals (best of 11 legs)
17	Gabriel Clemens 93.58	6
Steve Brown 88.01	4
29	Chris Dobey 99.49	6
Ryan Meikle 89.79	1
18	Callan Rydz 97.50	6
26	Mervyn King 92.66	3
Maik Kuivenhoven 83.58	2
11	Dirk van Duijvenbode 85.34	6

Semi-finals (best of 13 legs)
17	Gabriel Clemens 104.13	7
29	Chris Dobey 106.20	6
18	Callan Rydz 97.83	7
11	Dirk van Duijvenbode 93.70	1

Final (best of 15 legs)
17	Gabriel Clemens 90.93	6
18	Callan Rydz 90.99	8

=== Players Championship 26 ===
Players Championship 26 was contested on Thursday 21 October 2021 at the Barnsley Metrodome in Barnsley. Madars Razma hit a nine-dart finish against Rob Cross. The tournament was won by Rob Cross, who defeated Ryan Searle 8–6 in the final.

Quarter-finals (best of 11 legs)
Madars Razma 84.11	6
Luke Woodhouse 83.96	4
20	Rob Cross 101.87	6
21	Vincent van der Voort 93.82	2
18	Nathan Aspinall 108.55	6
10	Dirk van Duijvenbode 102.14	4
3	Michael Smith 93.98	4
11	Ryan Searle 100.70	6

Semi-finals (best of 13 legs)
Madars Razma 90.05	4
20	Rob Cross 93.85	7
18	Nathan Aspinall 91.09	5
11	Ryan Searle 95.97	7

Final (best of 15 legs)
20	Rob Cross 97.24	8
11	Ryan Searle 95.74	6

=== Players Championship 27 ===
Players Championship 27 was contested on Friday 22 October 2021 at the Barnsley Metrodome in Barnsley. The tournament was won by Michael Smith, who defeated Ross Smith 8–6 in the final.

Quarter-finals (best of 11 legs)
17	Ross Smith 110.68	6
8	Damon Heta 96.39	5
13	Rob Cross 101.35	6
5	Brendan Dolan 94.49	4
18	Nathan Aspinall 97.63	5
Florian Hempel 98.37	6
3	Michael Smith 94.35	6
Kim Huybrechts 95.49	3

Semi-finals (best of 13 legs)
17	Ross Smith 103.75	7
13	Rob Cross 100.72	6
Florian Hempel 86.81	3
3	Michael Smith 94.01	7

Final (best of 15 legs)
17	Ross Smith 97.07	6
3	Michael Smith 97.06	8

== November (Super Series 8) ==
=== Players Championship 28 ===
Players Championship 28 was contested on Tuesday 2 November 2021 at the Barnsley Metrodome in Barnsley. Gabriel Clemens and Scott Waites hit nine-dart finishes against Ross Smith and Daryl Gurney respectively. The tournament was won by Chris Dobey, who defeated Ryan Searle 8–6 in the final.

Quarter-finals (best of 11 legs)
17	Gabriel Clemens 97.73	5
8	Ryan Searle 98.15	6
13	Michael van Gerwen 87.73	2
28	Dave Chisnall 102.47	6
2	José de Sousa 99.93	2
26	Chris Dobey 105.03	6
Alan Soutar 93.61	1
11	Rob Cross 100.59	6

Semi-finals (best of 13 legs)
8	Ryan Searle 98.04	7
28	Dave Chisnall 89.90	4
26	Chris Dobey 111.73	7
11	Rob Cross 112.95	4

Final (best of 15 legs)
8	Ryan Searle 98.53	6
26	Chris Dobey 97.85	8

=== Players Championship 29 ===
Players Championship 29 was contested on Wednesday 3 November 2021 at the Barnsley Metrodome in Barnsley. Steve West and Mickey Mansell hit nine-dart finishes against José de Sousa and Krzysztof Kciuk respectively. The tournament was won by Michael van Gerwen.

Quarter-finals (best of 11 legs)
Jelle Klaasen 95.29	0
9	Damon Heta 101.33	6
20	Krzysztof Ratajski 101.20	2
12	Michael van Gerwen 107.21	6
18	Nathan Aspinall 109.23	6
7	Ryan Searle 100.59	4
30	Kim Huybrechts 89.46	3
William O'Connor 93.43	6

Semi-finals (best of 13 legs)
9	Damon Heta 89.90	3
12	Michael van Gerwen 96.89	7
18	Nathan Aspinall 100.64	7
William O'Connor 94.29	4

Final (best of 15 legs)
12	Michael van Gerwen 102.30	8
18	Nathan Aspinall 102.57	5

=== Players Championship 30 ===
Players Championship 30 was contested on Thursday 4 November 2021 at the Barnsley Metrodome in Barnsley. The tournament was won by Krzysztof Ratajski, who defeated Joe Cullen 8–7 in the final.

Quarter-finals (best of 11 legs)
Matthew Edgar 88.15	3
8	Michael van Gerwen 98.54	6
4	Joe Cullen 104.87	6
21	Danny Noppert 108.47	3
18	James Wade 90.84	4
Darius Labanauskas 95.68	6
19	Krzysztof Ratajski 98.96	6
6	Jonny Clayton 101.56	5

Semi-finals (best of 13 legs)
8	Michael van Gerwen 104.22	4
4	Joe Cullen 111.28	7
Darius Labanauskas 92.75	3
19	Krzysztof Ratajski 100.47	7

Final (best of 15 legs)
4	Joe Cullen 88.01	7
19	Krzysztof Ratajski 96.04	8

== Players Championship Order of Merit ==
The top 64 on the Players Championship Order of Merit qualified for the 2021 Players Championship Finals:

Prize money in the tables is in units of £1,000.

Rank	Player	Prize money	Rank	Player	Prize money
1	José de Sousa	67.25	33	Darius Labanauskas	20.75
2	Peter Wright	61.25	34	Kim Huybrechts	20.5
3	Jonny Clayton	60.75	35	Martijn Kleermaker	20.25
4	Michael Smith	58.75	36	Alan Soutar	20
5	Ryan Searle	52	37	Luke Woodhouse	19
6	Joe Cullen	51.25	38	Jamie Hughes	18.75
7	Michael van Gerwen	49.5	39	Maik Kuivenhoven	18.75
8	Gerwyn Price	48	40	Ian White	17.75
9	Brendan Dolan	46.75	41	Ritchie Edhouse	17.25
10	Dirk van Duijvenbode	46.25	42	Gary Anderson	17
11	Dimitri Van den Bergh	44.25	43	Rowby-John Rodriguez	17
12	Rob Cross	42.25	44	Jeff Smith	16.5
13	Callan Rydz	38.25	45	Ricky Evans	16
14	Ross Smith	37	46	Jason Heaver	15
15	Damon Heta	37	47	Steve Beaton	15
16	Chris Dobey	36.5	48	Ron Meulenkamp	15
17	Krzysztof Ratajski	36	49	William O'Connor	14.5
18	Gabriel Clemens	35.5	50	Steve Lennon	14.5
19	Luke Humphries	35.25	51	Rusty-Jake Rodriguez	14.5
20	James Wade	32	52	Mensur Suljović	14.25
21	Nathan Aspinall	30	53	Jermaine Wattimena	14
22	Danny Noppert	30	54	Madars Razma	13.75
23	Stephen Bunting	29.75	55	Ryan Meikle	13.75
24	Dave Chisnall	28.5	56	Chas Barstow	13.5
25	Martin Schindler	27	57	Jason Lowe	13
26	Raymond van Barneveld	26	58	Kevin Doets	12.5
27	Vincent van der Voort	25.25	59	Andy Boulton	12.5
28	Ryan Joyce	24.75	60	Simon Whitlock	12.25
29	Daryl Gurney	23.75	61	William Borland	12
30	Scott Mitchell	23	62	Alan Tabern	11.75
31	Adrian Lewis	23	63	Keane Barry	11.75
32	Mervyn King	22.75	64	Devon Petersen	11.5

== Top averages ==
The table lists all players who achieved a three-dart average of at least 110 in a match. In the case one player has multiple records, this is indicated by the number in brackets.

#	Player	Round	Average	Event	Result	Ref
1	José de Sousa	1	127.01	13	Won	
2	Dave Chisnall	1	120.24	13	Won	
3	Callan Rydz	2	117.37	28	Won	
4	José de Sousa (2)	4	117.12	10	Won	
5	Dimitri Van den Bergh	4	116.93	14	Won	
6	Ryan Searle	Semi-Final	116.90	22	Won	
7	Raymond van Barneveld	1	115.73	17	Won	
8	Keegan Brown	2	115.24	21	Won	
9	Michael Smith	4	114.52	10	Won	
10	Gerwyn Price	2	114.30	19	Won	
11	James Wade	1	114.15	3	Won	
12	Damon Heta	1	114.12	8	Won	
13	José de Sousa (3)	Final	114.08	9	Won	
14	Michael van Gerwen	2	113.48	26	Won	
15	Michael van Gerwen (2)	2	113.05	20	Won	
16	Rob Cross	Semi-Final	112.95	28	Lost	
17	Dave Chisnall (2)	2	112.73	2	Won	
18	Callan Rydz (2)	2	112.73	16	Won	
19	Dirk van Duijvenbode	4	112.72	5	Won	
20	Gerwyn Price (2)	4	112.63	17	Won	
21	Michael van Gerwen (3)	3	112.58	21	Lost	
22	Joe Cullen	2	112.53	28	Won	
23	Gerwyn Price (3)	Semi-Final	112.51	21	Won	
24	Dirk van Duijvenbode (2)	2	112.32	2	Won	
25	Ryan Searle (2)	1	112.24	20	Won	
26	Dirk van Duijvenbode (3)	2	112.10	30	Won	
27	José de Sousa (4)	Semi-Final	112.07	15	Won	
28	Jonny Clayton	4	111.77	13	Won	
29	Chris Dobey	Semi-Final	111.73	28	Won	
30	Joe Cullen (2)	3	111.44	5	Won	
31	Dimitri Van den Bergh (2)	Quarter-Final	111.33	9	Won	
32	Ryan Searle (3)	Quarter-Final	111.33	18	Won	
33	Brendan Dolan	1	111.28	5	Won	
34	Joe Cullen (3)	Semi-Final	111.28	30	Won	
35	José de Sousa (5)	Quarter-Final	111.06	9	Won	
36	Rob Cross (2)	4	111.00	27	Won	
37	Adrian Lewis	1	110.80	25	Won	
38	Ross Smith	Quarter-Final	110.68	27	Won	
39	Adrian Lewis (2)	1	110.58	15	Won	
40	Ryan Searle (4)	4	110.57	18	Won	
41	Ryan Searle (5)	3	110.52	28	Won	
42	Gary Anderson	3	110.50	1	Won	
43	Dimitri Van den Bergh (3)	3	110.43	17	Won	
44	Danny Noppert	2	110.30	18	Won	
45	Gerwyn Price (4)	3	110.21	16	Won	
46	José de Sousa (6)	1	110.12	1	Won	
