= 2025 PDC Challenge Tour =

Darts tournament series

The 2025 PDC Challenge Tour (known for sponsorship reasons as the Winmau Challenge Tour) was a series of non-televised darts tournaments organised by the Professional Darts Corporation (PDC). A secondary tour to the PDC Pro Tour, it consisted of 24 tournaments, held over four weekends of five events and one weekend of four events.

The Challenge Tour is the PDC's second-tier system for players who competed at the 2025 Qualifying Schools but did not win a PDC Tour Card. Under PDC Order of Merit Rule 4.2, the Challenge Tour Order of Merit rankings were used to top up Players Championship (PC) events up to 128 entries, when any of the 2025 Tour Card holders not enter the PC tournaments.

Under PDC Order of Merit Rule 6.9, the 2025 Challenge Tour prizes were as follows:

- The top two players on the Challenge Tour Order of Merit, who had not obtained a PDC Tour Card via another method, won a two-year Tour Card for the 2026 and 2027 seasons.
- The top three players on the Challenge Tour Order of Merit, who had not qualified via another method, qualified for places at the 2026 PDC World Championship.
- The highest ranked player on the Challenge Tour Order of Merit, Stefan Bellmont, received a spot at the 2025 Grand Slam of Darts.
- The players in the top 16 of the Challenge Tour Order of Merit, who had not obtained a PDC Tour Card before 2026 Qualifying School (Q–School), were granted free entry to the final stage of Q–School.
- The eight highest ranked players from the Challenge Tour Order of Merit, who did not earn a Tour Card for the 2026 season, qualified for the first round of the 2026 UK Open.

== Prize money ==
The prize money for the Challenge Tour events remained the same as in 2023 and 2024. £360,000 was the total prize fund, with £15,000 being the prize fund for each of the 24 events. The winner of each event received £2,500. The prize fund breakdown was:

Stage (no. of players)		Prize money (Total: £15,000)
Winner	(1)	£2,500
Runner-up	(1)	£1,000
Semi-finalists	(2)	£750
Quarter-finalists	(4)	£500
Last 16	(8)	£300
Last 32	(16)	£200
Last 64	(32)	£75

The top players on the Challenge Tour Order of Merit act as reserves for 2025 PDC Players Championship series events. If one of the Tour Card holders does not enter or withdraws from a Players Championship event, the highest ranked available player on the Challenge Tour Order of Merit may fill in.

== January ==
=== Challenge Tour 1 ===
Challenge Tour 1 was contested on Friday 17 January 2025 at the Marshall Arena in Milton Keynes. The tournament was won by Beau Greaves, who defeated Stefan Bellmont 5–4 in the final.

Quarter-finals (best of 9 legs)
Jarno Bottenberg 84.99	2
Stefan Bellmont 85.39	5
Simon Whitlock 93.79	3
Tommy Lishman 94.15	5
Henry Coates 81.93	1
Beau Greaves 95.30	5
Michael Unterbuchner 78.63	5
Mervyn King 92.13	4

Semi-finals (best of 9 legs)
Stefan Bellmont 106.25	5
Tommy Lishman 95.78	3
Beau Greaves 90.05	5
Michael Unterbuchner 91.93	3

Final (best of 9 legs)
Stefan Bellmont 88.85	4
Beau Greaves 94.49	5

=== Challenge Tour 2 ===
Challenge Tour 2 was contested on Friday 17 January 2025 at the Marshall Arena in Milton Keynes. The tournament was won by Carl Sneyd, who defeated Tommy Lishman 5–1 in the final.

Quarter-finals (best of 9 legs)
Tommy Lishman 89.28	5
Graham Usher 81.08	2
Kevin Burness 83.59	5
Nathan Girvan 79.13	2
Jeffrey Sparidaans 87.95	5
Christopher Wickenden 84.04	4
Carl Sneyd 90.54	5
Gilbert van der Meijden 89.56	0

Semi-finals (best of 9 legs)
Tommy Lishman 86.41	5
Kevin Burness 81.65	1
Jeffrey Sparidaans 82.91	3
Carl Sneyd 87.44	5

Final (best of 9 legs)
Tommy Lishman 87.56	1
Carl Sneyd 91.86	5

=== Challenge Tour 3 ===
Challenge Tour 3 was contested on Saturday 18 January 2025 at the Marshall Arena in Milton Keynes. The tournament was won by Beau Greaves, who defeated John Henderson 5–0 in the final.

Quarter-finals (best of 9 legs)
Paul Rowley 83.41	4
Kevin Burness 89.37	5
Tom Sykes 89.16	4
John Henderson 90.90	5
John O'Shea 87.42	2
Beau Greaves 97.57	5
Thomas Banks 92.22	4
Jimmy van Schie 93.16	5

Semi-finals (best of 9 legs)
Kevin Burness 81.81	3
John Henderson 78.00	5
Beau Greaves 99.74	5
Jimmy van Schie 92.28	1

Final (best of 9 legs)
John Henderson 90.46	0
Beau Greaves 101.55	5

=== Challenge Tour 4 ===
Challenge Tour 4 was contested on Saturday 18 January 2025 at the Marshall Arena in Milton Keynes. Ted Evetts hit a nine-dart finish in his match against Shane McGuirk. The tournament was won by Darius Labanauskas, who defeated Mervyn King 5–3 in the final.

Quarter-finals (best of 9 legs)
Martin Grearson 86.36	1
Mervyn King 97.43	5
Joe Hunt 89.23	5
Simon Whitlock 87.95	4
Adam Mould 91.11	4
Darius Labanauskas 95.57	5
Ted Evetts 85.40	5
Jarno Bottenberg 75.70	0

Semi-finals (best of 9 legs)
Mervyn King 87.00	5
Joe Hunt 85.60	4
Darius Labanauskas 85.35	5
Ted Evetts 80.88	2

Final (best of 9 legs)
Mervyn King 91.23	3
Darius Labanauskas 87.17	5

=== Challenge Tour 5 ===
Challenge Tour 5 was contested on Sunday 19 January 2025 at the Marshall Arena in Milton Keynes. The tournament was won by Stefan Bellmont, who defeated Danny Jansen 5–1 in the final.

Quarter-finals (best of 9 legs)
Aden Kirk 92.33	5
Chas Barstow 86.03	2
Stefan Bellmont 95.09	5
Graham Hall 94.40	3
Danny van Trijp 82.89	1
Danny Jansen 90.88	5
Andreas Harrysson 82.82	0
Michael Flynn 102.95	5

Semi-finals (best of 9 legs)
Aden Kirk 85.98	4
Stefan Bellmont 88.42	5
Danny Jansen 93.50	5
Michael Flynn 98.01	2

Final (best of 9 legs)
Stefan Bellmont 95.80	5
Danny Jansen 84.17	1

== March ==
=== Challenge Tour 6 ===
Challenge Tour 6 was contested on Friday 14 March at the Halle 39 in Hildesheim. The tournament was won by Dragutin Horvat, who defeated Ted Evetts 5–4 in the final.

Quarter-finals (best of 9 legs)
Tom Sykes 88.38	3
Graham Usher 86.37	5
Dragutin Horvat 94.80	5
Michael Unterbuchner 83.56	1
Ted Evetts 89.77	5
Ron Meulenkamp 83.90	2
Nicolas Thuillier 80.45	3
Trevor Burkhill 81.92	5

Semi-finals (best of 9 legs)
Graham Usher 92.30	3
Dragutin Horvat 97.19	5
Ted Evetts 95.13	5
Trevor Burkhill 83.68	0

Final (best of 9 legs)
Dragutin Horvat 97.30	5
Ted Evetts 91.05	4

=== Challenge Tour 7 ===
Challenge Tour 7 was contested on Friday 14 March at the Halle 39 in Hildesheim. The tournament was won by Darius Labanauskas, who defeated Keegan Brown 5–2 in the final.

Quarter-finals (best of 9 legs)
David Sharp 80.58	3
Adam Mould 87.44	5
Keegan Brown 85.19	5
Kevin Burness 89.06	3
Rowby-John Rodriguez 78.20	2
Darius Labanauskas 82.85	5
David Pallett 79.95	5
Arno Merk 72.30	0

Semi-finals (best of 9 legs)
Adam Mould 80.21	4
Keegan Brown 83.69	5
Darius Labanauskas 88.41	5
David Pallett 71.86	0

Final (best of 9 legs)
Keegan Brown 70.61	2
Darius Labanauskas 81.80	5

=== Challenge Tour 8 ===
Challenge Tour 8 was contested on Saturday 15 March at the Halle 39 in Hildesheim. The tournament was won by Darius Labanauskas, who defeated Scott Waites 5–4 in the final.

Quarter-finals (best of 9 legs)
Darius Labanauskas 96.32	5
Stefan Bellmont 81.77	1
Ryan O'Connor 87.73	1
Owen Maiden 100.79	5
Tom Sykes 90.85	2
Scott Waites 86.28	5
Sam Spivey 76.37	1
Alexander Merkx 95.36	5

Semi-finals (best of 9 legs)
Darius Labanauskas 80.81	5
Owen Maiden 73.47	0
Scott Waites 103.03	5
Alexander Merkx 90.07	1

Final (best of 9 legs)
Darius Labanauskas 92.58	5
Scott Waites 90.64	4

=== Challenge Tour 9 ===
Challenge Tour 9 was contested on Saturday 15 March at the Halle 39 in Hildesheim. The tournament was won by Ted Evetts, who defeated Michael Unterbuchner 5–1 in the final.

Quarter-finals (best of 9 legs)
Mervyn King 81.31	4
Callum Goffin 79.28	5
Darius Labanauskas 84.82	4
Michael Unterbuchner 77.82	5
Ted Evetts 86.57	5
Kevin Lankhuizen 76.17	1
Andreas Harrysson 85.10	5
Colin Osborne 89.78	3

Semi-finals (best of 9 legs)
Callum Goffin 85.17	3
Michael Unterbuchner 86.41	5
Ted Evetts 100.79	5
Andreas Harrysson 84.24	1

Final (best of 9 legs)
Michael Unterbuchner 88.71	1
Ted Evetts 94.91	5

=== Challenge Tour 10 ===
Challenge Tour 10 was contested on Sunday 16 March at the Halle 39 in Hildesheim. The tournament was won by Scott Campbell, who defeated Dan Hands 5–3 in the final.

Quarter-finals (best of 9 legs)
Levy Frauenfelder 87.76	5
Christopher Wickenden 85.94	3
Dan Hands 89.57	5
Sam Spivey 92.22	4
Stu Wilson 77.79	0
Jacques Labre 87.38	5
James Beeton 82.49	2
Scott Campbell 90.71	5

Semi-finals (best of 9 legs)
Levy Frauenfelder 92.27	2
Dan Hands 90.08	5
Jacques Labre 76.01	3
Scott Campbell 85.38	5

Final (best of 9 legs)
Dan Hands 84.97	3
Scott Campbell 91.59	5

== May ==
=== Challenge Tour 11 ===
Challenge Tour 11 was contested on Friday 2 May at the Marshall Arena in Milton Keynes. The tournament was won by Mervyn King, who defeated Henry Coates 5–0 in the final.

Quarter-finals (best of 9 legs)
Nathan Girvan 88.29	3
Henry Coates 90.25	5
Patrick Quinn 84.83	5
Martin Thomas 83.52	4
Jenson Walker 95.23	3
Ted Evetts 99.50	5
Sam Spivey 79.79	2
Mervyn King 88.46	5

Semi-finals (best of 9 legs)
Henry Coates 94.80	5
Patrick Quinn 89.46	2
Ted Evetts 88.20	4
Mervyn King 87.69	5

Final (best of 9 legs)
Henry Coates 89.48	0
Mervyn King 101.55	5

=== Challenge Tour 12 ===
Challenge Tour 12 was contested on Friday 2 May at the Marshall Arena in Milton Keynes. Jamai van den Herik hit a nine-dart finish in his match against Carl Sneyd. The tournament was won by Jamai van den Herik, who defeated Graham Hall 5–2 in the final.

Quarter-finals (best of 9 legs)
Keegan Brown 88.70	4
Sietse Lap 95.20	5
Mervyn King 89.64	4
Graham Hall 86.56	5
Jamai van den Herik 95.05	5
Carl Sneyd 82.67	2
Beau Greaves 81.99	3
Ciarán Teehan 74.38	5

Semi-finals (best of 9 legs)
Sietse Lap 94.24	4
Graham Hall 94.76	5
Jamai van den Herik 85.40	5
Ciarán Teehan 81.12	1

Final (best of 9 legs)
Graham Hall 90.83	2
Jamai van den Herik 92.89	5

=== Challenge Tour 13 ===
Challenge Tour 13 was contested on Saturday 3 May at the Marshall Arena in Milton Keynes. The tournament was won by Danny van Trijp, who defeated Graham Hall 5–2 in the final.

Quarter-finals (best of 9 legs)
Luke Smith 87.81	5
Jamie Hughes 79.34	1
Graham Hall 98.18	5
Jurjen van der Velde 83.12	2
Danny van Trijp 89.84	5
Shaun Carroll 81.26	3
Stefan Bellmont 95.52	4
Ted Evetts 97.08	5

Semi-finals (best of 9 legs)
Luke Smith 86.62	1
Graham Hall 91.28	5
Danny van Trijp 84.74	5
Ted Evetts 90.97	4

Final (best of 9 legs)
Graham Hall 88.96	2
Danny van Trijp 90.21	5

=== Challenge Tour 14 ===
Challenge Tour 14 was contested on Saturday 3 May at the Marshall Arena in Milton Keynes. The tournament was won by Stefan Bellmont, who defeated Keegan Brown 5–3 in the final.

Quarter-finals (best of 9 legs)
Shane McGuirk 102.02	4
Jack Tweddell 103.25	5
Charlie Martin 79.14	1
Stefan Bellmont 82.11	5
Ron Meulenkamp 80.19	2
Keegan Brown 86.15	5
Darius Labanauskas 79.42	3
Shaun Carroll 84.24	5

Semi-finals (best of 9 legs)
Jack Tweddell 88.99	4
Stefan Bellmont 90.93	5
Keegan Brown 83.48	5
Shaun Carroll 75.95	2

Final (best of 9 legs)
Stefan Bellmont 85.07	5
Keegan Brown 79.52	3

=== Challenge Tour 15 ===
Challenge Tour 15 was contested on Sunday 4 May at the Marshall Arena in Milton Keynes. The tournament was won by Jack Tweddell, who defeated Mervyn King 5–1 in the final.

Quarter-finals (best of 9 legs)
Colin Osborne 87.46	5
Steve West 75.69	2
Dmitrijs Žukovs 88.24	2
Jack Tweddell 89.30	5
Shane McGuirk 87.58	2
Mervyn King 92.09	5
Nathan Girvan 87.60	5
Michael Flynn 85.62	4

Semi-finals (best of 9 legs)
Colin Osborne 83.38	1
Jack Tweddell 93.66	5
Mervyn King 90.54	5
Nathan Girvan 83.54	0

Final (best of 9 legs)
Jack Tweddell 92.94	5
Mervyn King 91.21	1

== August ==
=== Challenge Tour 16 ===
Challenge Tour 16 was contested on Friday 15 August at the Leicester Arena. Joe Hunt won his first Challenge Tour title by defeating Derek Maclean 5–4 in the final.

Quarter-finals (best of 9 legs)
Scott Campbell 81.27	3
Joe Hunt 93.54	5
Ashley Coleman 95.87	5
Andreas Harrysson 87.03	3
Charlie Manby 86.93	3
Derek Maclean 86.83	5
Tommy Lishman 78.10	5
Jack Tweddell 83.14	4

Semi-finals (best of 9 legs)
Joe Hunt 89.96	5
Ashley Coleman 85.03	4
Tommy Lishman 72.08	1
Derek Maclean 79.38	5

Final (best of 9 legs)
Joe Hunt 85.52	5
Derek Maclean 88.77	4

=== Challenge Tour 17 ===
Challenge Tour 17 was contested on Friday 15 August at the Leicester Arena. Lee Cocks defeated Jack Tweddell 5–3 in the final to claim his second career Challenge Tour title.

Quarter-finals (best of 9 legs)
Jack Tweddell 87.99	5
Aden Kirk 81.76	2
Andreas Harrysson 83.62	3
Scott Waites 95.22	5
David Pallett 87.68	5
Michael Unterbuchner 78.33	1
Reece Colley 82.96	0
Lee Cocks 87.38	5

Semi-finals (best of 9 legs)
Jack Tweddell 93.15	5
Scott Waites 89.92	3
David Pallett 80.36	4
Lee Cocks 89.31	5

Final (best of 9 legs)
Jack Tweddell 87.00	3
Lee Cocks 82.65	5

=== Challenge Tour 18 ===
Challenge Tour 18 was contested on Saturday 16 August at the Leicester Arena. David Davies won his first Challenge Tour title by defeating Alexander Merkx 5–3 in the final.

Quarter-finals (best of 9 legs)
Jamai van den Herik 100.20	5
Tom Lonsdale 88.96	0
David Davies 88.29	5
Kurt Parry 84.12	3
Charlie Manby 98.88	5
Lee Cocks 88.43	0
Alexander Merkx 96.60	5
Martin Thomas 79.03	0

Semi-finals (best of 9 legs)
Jamai van den Herik 92.49	2
David Davies 93.12	5
Charlie Manby 85.84	3
Alexander Merkx 86.73	5

Final (best of 9 legs)
David Davies 91.50	5
Alexander Merkx 86.17	3

=== Challenge Tour 19 ===
Challenge Tour 19 was contested on Saturday 16 August at the Leicester Arena. Jamai van den Herik won his second title of the season, beating Jenson Walker 5–4 in the final despite being 4–0 down.

Quarter-finals (best of 9 legs)
Bruno Stöckli 86.85	5
Tommy Morris 78.88	2
David Pallett 90.00	1
Jamai van den Herik 99.13	5
Lewis Pride 87.00	1
Jenson Walker 93.69	5
Peter Burgoyne 90.54	5
Kurt Parry 80.53	4

Semi-finals (best of 9 legs)
Bruno Stöckli 77.43	2
Jamai van den Herik 82.39	5
Jenson Walker 84.44	5
Peter Burgoyne 75.62	0

Final (best of 9 legs)
Jamai van den Herik 96.11	5
Jenson Walker 89.34	4

=== Challenge Tour 20 ===
Challenge Tour 20 was contested on Sunday 17 August at the Leicester Arena. The tournament was won by Scott Waites, who defeated Michael Unterbuchner 5–2 in the final.

Quarter-finals (best of 9 legs)
David Pallett 92.95	4
Alexander Merkx 96.77	5
Michael Unterbuchner 92.95	5
Danny van Trijp 100.46	4
Patrick Dekker 86.12	1
Scott Waites 91.34	5
Ted Evetts 97.82	5
Andy Cass 86.35	4

Semi-finals (best of 9 legs)
Alexander Merkx 91.60	4
Michael Unterbuchner 92.73	5
Scott Waites 84.53	5
Ted Evetts 84.39	3

Final (best of 9 legs)
Michael Unterbuchner 98.51	2
Scott Waites 100.38	5

== October ==
=== Challenge Tour 21 ===
Challenge Tour 21 was contested on Saturday 25 October at the Robin Park Tennis Centre in Wigan. Michael Unterbuchner won his first Challenge Tour title by defeating Peter Burgoyne 5–3 in the final.

Quarter-finals (best of 9 legs)
Peter Burgoyne 86.97	5
Scott Campbell 83.52	1
Oliver Mitchell 98.01	2
Jamie Hughes 108.10	5
Michael Unterbuchner 88.58	5
Sam Spivey 85.66	2
David Davies 93.93	3
Charlie Manby 106.19	5

Semi-finals (best of 9 legs)
Peter Burgoyne 94.36	5
Jamie Hughes 89.04	2
Michael Unterbuchner 101.86	5
Charlie Manby 88.37	4

Final (best of 9 legs)
Peter Burgoyne 81.09	3
Michael Unterbuchner 86.10	5

=== Challenge Tour 22 ===
Challenge Tour 22 was contested on Saturday 25 October at the Robin Park Tennis Centre in Wigan.

Quarter-finals (best of 9 legs)
Jurjen van der Velde 95.74	5
Jack Tweddell 93.43	2
Daniel Klose 90.54	5
Ted Evetts 83.27	0
Daniel Astbury 99.39	2
David Pallett 93.54	5
Jamie Hughes 98.57	5
Nathan Potter 85.00	1

Semi-finals (best of 9 legs)
Jurjen van der Velde 92.42	5
Daniel Klose 89.59	2
David Pallett 95.95	3
Jamie Hughes 87.88	5

Final (best of 9 legs)
Jurjen van der Velde 99.97	5
Jamie Hughes 87.22	2

=== Challenge Tour 23 ===
Challenge Tour 23 was contested on Sunday 26 October at the Robin Park Tennis Centre in Wigan.

Quarter-finals (best of 9 legs)
Daniel Ayres 88.73	5
Kurt Parry 85.53	4
Keegan Brown 82.28	5
Joe Croft 87.78	4
Jurjen van der Velde 91.16	5
Sam Spivey 87.10	3
Stefan Bellmont 87.08	5
Adam Smith-Neale 75.95	1

Semi-finals (best of 9 legs)
Daniel Ayres 89.58	5
Keegan Brown 84.32	1
Jurjen van der Velde 89.55	4
Stefan Bellmont 91.78	5

Final (best of 9 legs)
Daniel Ayres 88.86	3
Stefan Bellmont 98.47	5

=== Challenge Tour 24 ===
Challenge Tour 24 was contested on Sunday 26 October at the Robin Park Tennis Centre in Wigan.

Quarter-finals (best of 9 legs)
Sam Spivey 79.60	5
Matt Gallett 81.17	2
Michael Unterbuchner 93.07	4
Jurjen van der Velde 93.73	5
Daniel Ayres 93.51	4
Alexander Merkx 90.92	5
Lee Cocks 81.27	4
Mervyn King 82.03	5

Semi-finals (best of 9 legs)
Sam Spivey 90.27	5
Jurjen van der Velde 89.03	3
Alexander Merkx 92.03	5
Mervyn King 94.65	4

Final (best of 9 legs)
Sam Spivey 81.44	5
Alexander Merkx 84.35	3

== Order of Merit ==
2025 Challenge Tour ranking top 16
Rank	Player	Prize money
1	Stefan Bellmont (Note: Bellmont, Labanauskas and Greaves qualified for the UK Open as 2026 Tour Card holders)	£11,500
2	Darius Labanauskas (Note: Labanauskas qualified for the World Championship via his Pro Tour ranking, meaning his qualification was awarded to the fourth-placed player)	£10,200
3	Ted Evetts	£8,725
4	Mervyn King	£7,975
5	Michael Unterbuchner	£7,825
6	Jamai van den Herik (Note: Van den Herik and Van der Velde qualified for the UK Open via their 2025 Development Tour ranking)	£7,400
7	Jack Tweddell	£6,400
8	Sam Spivey	£6,225
9	Alexander Merkx	£6,200
10	Jurjen van der Velde	£5,900
11	Beau Greaves	£5,875
12	Scott Waites	£5,350
13	Scott Campbell	£4,975
14	Carl Sneyd	£4,800
15	Danny van Trijp	£4,725
16	Graham Hall	£4,600

Provisional qualifications earned through Challenge Tour
2025 Grand Slam of Darts, 2026 PDC World Championship and 2026–27 PDC Tour Card
2026–27 Tour Card
2026 PDC World Championship and 2026 UK Open
2026 UK Open
