= 2025 PDC World Youth Championship =

Youth darts tournament

2025 Winmau World Youth Championship

Tournament information
- Dates: 13 October 2025; 23 November 2025 (final)
- Venue: Robin Park Leisure Centre; Butlin's Minehead (final)
- Location: Wigan, England; Minehead, England (final)
- Organisation(s): Professional Darts Corporation (PDC)
- Format: Legs; First to 5 (group stage); First to 6 (knockout stage)
- Prize fund: £100,000
- Winner's share: £12,000
- High checkout: 170; Adam Gawlas; Cam Crabtree; Sebastian Białecki

Champion(s)
- Gian van Veen (NED)

The 2025 PDC World Youth Championship (known for sponsorship reasons as the 2025 Winmau World Youth Championship) was the fifteenth edition of the PDC World Youth Championship, a darts tournament organised by the Professional Darts Corporation (PDC) for players aged between 16 and 24. The first stages of the tournament were played on 13 October 2025 at the Robin Park Leisure Centre in Wigan, England. The final was played in between the semi-finals and final of the Players Championship Finals on 23 November 2025 at the Butlin's Resort in Minehead, England. The total prize fund was £100,000, with the winner receiving £12,000.

The tournament featured 128 players, comprising PDC Tour Card holders, players who competed on the 2025 PDC Development Tour, and additional international qualifiers. Reigning world champion Luke Littler, who won the 2023 World Youth Championship, took part in the tournament after winning the World Grand Prix the previous night. He was defeated 6–5 in the semi-finals by Beau Greaves, who became the first woman to reach the final of the tournament.

Defending champion Gian van Veen, who defeated Jurjen van der Velde 6–5 to win the 2024 final, retained his title by defeating Greaves 6–3 in the final. He became the second player, after Dimitri Van den Bergh, to defend the title.

== Overview ==
=== Background ===
The World Youth Championship was first held in 2010, following the expansion of the Professional Darts Corporation (PDC) in the wake of their rejected offer to purchase the British Darts Organisation (BDO), their rival darts organisation. Arron Monk won the inaugural tournament, defeating future world champion Michael van Gerwen in the final on 3 January 2011. As in all years but 2021, the tournament was held with a knockout stage behind closed doors while the final was televised at a later date – on that occasion before the final of the 2011 World Championship. After the 2011 edition, the following finals were held on Premier League finals night, before settling in 2015 upon their current calendar position during the final session of the Players Championship Finals. The fourteen previous editions saw thirteen different champions, with Dimitri Van den Bergh being the only player to successfully defend their title.

The first stages of the 2025 tournament—from the group stage to the semi-finals—were played behind closed doors at the Robin Park Leisure Centre in Wigan, England on 13 October 2025. The final was played in between the semi-finals and final of the 2025 Players Championship Finals on 23 November 2025 at the Butlin's Resort in Minehead, England. Gian van Veen, who won the 2025 European Championship, was the defending champion, having defeated Jurjen van der Velde 6–5 in the 2024 final. Following his World Grand Prix victory on 12 October 2025, reigning world champion Luke Littler, who won the 2023 World Youth Championship, announced that he was going to take part in the World Youth Championship the following day. Both Littler and Van Veen were attempting to win a second World Youth Championship.

=== Format and qualification ===
The PDC World Youth Championship is open to players aged between 16 and 24. The tournament consisted of a group stage with four players in each group, followed by a knockout stage. The knockout stage was expanded to 64 players for the 2025 edition, with two players qualifying from each group. The group stage matches were played over the best of nine legs (first to five) and the knockout stage matches were played to the best of eleven (first to six).

The tournament featured 128 players; all PDC Tour Card holders aged 23 or under at the start of the season were invited, and were joined by additional international qualifiers and players who competed on the 2025 PDC Development Tour.

=== Prize money ===
The total prize fund for the event was £100,000, with the winner receiving £12,000. The prize fund breakdown was:

Position (no. of players)		Prize money (Total: £100,000)
Winner	(1)	£12,000
Runner-up	(1)	£6,000
Semi-finalists	(2)	£3,000
Quarter-finalists	(4)	£2,000
Last 16	(8)	£1,500
Last 32	(16)	£1,000
Last 64	(32)	£600
Third in group	(32)	£400
Fourth in group	(32)	£250

== Seeds ==
The 24 qualified players who were ranked on the PDC Order of Merit and the next 8 highest ranked players on the 2025 PDC Development Tour ranking were seeded in the group stage.

Seeded players

1. Luke Littler (ENG)
2. Gian van Veen (NED)
3. Keane Barry (IRL)
4. Dylan Slevin (IRL)
5. Sebastian Białecki (POL)
6. Owen Bates (ENG)
7. Cam Crabtree (ENG)
8. Dominik Grüllich (GER)
9. Leon Weber (GER)
10. Jamai van den Herik (NED)
11. Viktor Tingström (SWE)
12. Tavis Dudeney (ENG)
13. Beau Greaves (ENG)
14. Jarno Bottenberg (NED)
15. Jurjen van der Velde (NED)
16. Henry Coates (ENG)
17. Nathan Girvan (SCO)
18. Charlie Manby (ENG)
19. Adam Gawlas (CZE)
20. Xanti Van den Bergh (BEL)
21. Liam Maendl-Lawrance (GER)
22. Joshua Hermann (GER)
23. Jenson Walker (ENG)
24. Ryan Branley (ENG)
25. James Beeton (ENG)
26. Jannis Barkhausen (GER)
27. Patrik Williams (ENG)
28. Nathan Potter (ENG)
29. Tyler Thorpe (ENG)
30. Levy Frauenfelder (NED)
31. Bradly Roes (NED)
32. Damian Vetjens (NED)

== Draw ==
=== Group stage ===
NB: Pos. = Position; P = Played; W = Won; L = Lost; LF = Legs For; LA = Legs Against; +/− = Leg difference; Pts = Points; Avg = Three-dart average; Q = Qualified

==== Group 1 ====
Pos.	Player	P	W	L	LF	LA	+/−	Pts	Avg	Status
1	**Luke Littler (ENG)** (1)	3	3	0	15	5	10	6	97.88	Q
2	**Jeffrey Keen (NED)**	3	2	1	11	13	–2	4	82.31	Q
3	Matthias Moors (BEL)	3	1	2	11	13	–2	2	79.72	
4	Alexander-Veigar Thorvaldsson (ISL)	3	0	3	9	15	–6	0	82.46	

==== Group 2 ====
Pos.	Player	P	W	L	LF	LA	+/−	Pts	Avg	Status
1	**Charlie Large (ENG)**	3	3	0	15	7	8	6	85.13	Q
2	**Damian Vetjens (NED)** (32)	3	2	1	12	8	4	4	88.31	Q
3	Shane de Jong (NED)	3	1	2	10	11	–1	2	84.78	
4	Matthew Gordon (ENG)	3	0	3	4	15	–11	0	76.91	

==== Group 3 ====
Pos.	Player	P	W	L	LF	LA	+/−	Pts	Avg	Status
1	**Henry Coates (ENG)** (16)	3	3	0	15	2	13	6	86.44	Q
2	**Kilian Hohnstedt (GER)**	3	2	1	11	9	2	4	79.51	Q
3	Dylan Oaff (AUS)	3	1	2	10	12	–2	2	71.14	
4	Emmett Taylor (AUS)	3	0	3	2	15	–13	0	64.43	

==== Group 4 ====
Pos.	Player	P	W	L	LF	LA	+/−	Pts	Avg	Status
1	**Nathan Girvan (SCO)** (17)	3	3	0	15	8	7	6	79.45	Q
2	**Ben Edgar (NIR)**	3	2	1	14	7	7	4	77.31	Q
3	Harrison Leigh (ENG)	3	1	2	9	12	–3	2	74.75	
4	Bradley Roberts (WAL)	3	0	3	4	15	–11	0	65.70	

==== Group 5 ====
Pos.	Player	P	W	L	LF	LA	+/−	Pts	Avg	Status
1	**Dominik Grüllich (GER)** (8)	3	3	0	15	7	8	6	89.58	Q
2	**Jarod Becker (GER)**	3	2	1	13	8	5	4	79.82	Q
3	Lennert Faes (BEL)	3	1	2	7	12	–5	2	82.21	
4	Kimi Seemann (GER)	3	0	3	7	15	–8	0	75.21	

==== Group 6 ====
Pos.	Player	P	W	L	LF	LA	+/−	Pts	Avg	Status
1	**JJ Wright (ENG)**	3	2	1	12	10	2	4	80.38	Q
2	**Keenan Thomas (WAL)**	3	2	1	12	13	–1	4	87.12	Q
3	Jack Male (ENG)	3	1	2	12	12	0	2	83.95	
4	James Beeton (ENG) (25)	3	1	2	12	13	–1	2	83.87	

==== Group 7 ====
Pos.	Player	P	W	L	LF	LA	+/−	Pts	Avg	Status
1	**Leon Weber (GER)** (9)	3	2	1	13	7	6	4	85.06	Q
2	**Daniel Perry (ENG)**	3	2	1	12	9	3	4	74.96	Q
3	Jannes Bremermann (GER)	3	1	2	10	12	–2	2	76.14	
4	Niclas Wierling (GER)	3	1	2	7	14	–7	2	69.64	

==== Group 8 ====
Pos.	Player	P	W	L	LF	LA	+/−	Pts	Avg	Status
1	**Ryan Branley (ENG)** (24)	3	3	0	15	2	13	6	88.54	Q
2	**Sean McKeon (IRE)**	3	2	1	11	9	2	4	82.01	Q
3	Jack Boardman (ENG)	3	1	2	8	12	–4	2	73.62	
4	Johnny Stewart (NIR)	3	0	3	4	15	–11	0	67.13	

==== Group 9 ====
Pos.	Player	P	W	L	LF	LA	+/−	Pts	Avg	Status
1	**Dylan Slevin (IRE)** (4)	3	3	0	15	3	12	6	86.84	Q
2	**Finley Pember (WAL)**	3	2	1	11	10	1	4	78.76	Q
3	Denfie Drenthen (NED)	3	1	2	7	11	–4	2	73.98	
4	Ky Smith (AUS)	3	0	3	6	15	–9	0	72.82	

==== Group 10 ====
Pos.	Player	P	W	L	LF	LA	+/−	Pts	Avg	Status
1	**Tyler Thorpe (ENG)** (29)	3	3	0	15	5	10	6	84.38	Q
2	**Mark Tabak (NED)**	3	2	1	10	10	0	4	75.14	Q
3	David Fidler (CZE)	3	1	2	10	14	–4	2	84.02	
4	Oliver Pearce-Burgess (ENG)	3	0	3	9	15	–6	0	76.05	

==== Group 11 ====
Pos.	Player	P	W	L	LF	LA	+/−	Pts	Avg	Status
1	**Beau Greaves (ENG)** (13)	3	3	0	15	4	11	6	97.00	Q
2	**Noah Röschlein (GER)**	3	2	1	12	10	2	4	80.94	Q
3	Joey Lynaugh (USA)	3	1	2	7	11	–4	2	78.75	
4	Keanu van Velzen (NED)	3	0	3	6	15	–9	0	83.67	

==== Group 12 ====
Pos.	Player	P	W	L	LF	LA	+/−	Pts	Avg	Status
1	**Danny Jansen (NED)**	3	2	1	14	10	4	4	79.08	Q
2	**Cayden Smith (ENG)**	3	2	1	14	13	1	4	78.74	Q
3	Xanti Van den Bergh (BEL) (20)	3	1	2	13	14	–1	2	77.82	
4	Jamie McKinnon (ENG)	3	1	2	10	14	–4	2	72.22	

==== Group 13 ====
Pos.	Player	P	W	L	LF	LA	+/−	Pts	Avg	Status
1	**Justin Atellinghusen (NED)**	3	3	0	15	4	11	6	77.05	Q
2	**Sebastian Białecki (POL)** (5)	3	2	1	13	9	4	4	84.59	Q
3	Rohan Brouwers (NED)	3	1	2	9	11	–2	2	80.97	
4	Owen Roelofs (NED)	3	0	3	2	15	–13	0	65.59	

==== Group 14 ====
Pos.	Player	P	W	L	LF	LA	+/−	Pts	Avg	Status
1	**Dylan Dowling (IRL)**	3	3	0	15	9	6	6	75.36	Q
2	**Nathan Potter (ENG)** (28)	3	2	1	13	9	4	4	80.03	Q
3	Thomas Banks (ENG)	3	1	2	8	14	–6	2	78.49	
4	Connor Arberry (ENG)	3	0	3	11	15	–4	0	77.23	

==== Group 15 ====
Pos.	Player	P	W	L	LF	LA	+/−	Pts	Avg	Status
1	**Tavis Dudeney (ENG)** (12)	3	3	0	15	8	7	6	81.04	Q
2	**Jack Gillett (ENG)**	3	2	1	14	10	4	4	72.52	Q
3	Mitchell Beswick (AUS)	3	1	2	11	12	–1	2	70.46	
4	Michael Andersen (AUS)	3	0	3	5	15	–10	0	55.81	

==== Group 16 ====
Pos.	Player	P	W	L	LF	LA	+/−	Pts	Avg	Status
1	**Liam Maendl-Lawrance (GER)** (21)	3	3	0	15	9	6	6	83.97	Q
2	**Mitchell Leeming (ENG)**	3	2	1	14	11	3	4	72.21	Q
3	Zacarno King (NZL)	3	1	2	13	12	1	2	67.10	
4	Cody Dewey (AUS)	3	0	3	5	15	–10	0	66.57	

==== Group 17 ====
Pos.	Player	P	W	L	LF	LA	+/−	Pts	Avg	Status
1	**Gian van Veen (NED)** (2)	3	3	0	15	3	12	6	98.41	Q
2	**Ronan McDonagh (IRL)**	3	2	1	13	7	6	4	88.84	Q
3	Zac Prince (ENG)	3	1	2	6	12	–6	2	77.64	
4	Wessel Tempelaars (NED)	3	0	3	3	15	–12	0	78.68	

==== Group 18 ====
Pos.	Player	P	W	L	LF	LA	+/−	Pts	Avg	Status
1	**Shusaku Nakamura (JPN)**	3	3	0	15	3	12	6	78.87	Q
2	**Tom Garfield (ENG)**	3	2	1	10	9	1	4	71.64	Q
3	Lleyton Molyneux (ENG)	3	1	2	12	14	–2	2	68.29	
4	Bradly Roes (NED) (31)	3	0	3	4	15	–11	0	62.96	

==== Group 19 ====
Pos.	Player	P	W	L	LF	LA	+/−	Pts	Avg	Status
1	**Aidan O'Hara (IRL)**	3	3	0	15	7	8	6	83.64	Q
2	**Jurjen van der Velde (NED)** (15)	3	2	1	14	10	4	4	88.64	Q
3	Jack Peet (ENG)	3	1	2	7	14	–7	2	73.36	
4	Alfie Busby (ENG)	3	0	3	10	15	–5	0	82.74	

==== Group 20 ====
Pos.	Player	P	W	L	LF	LA	+/−	Pts	Avg	Status
1	**Cole Davey (WAL)**	3	3	0	15	4	11	6	86.37	Q
2	**Charlie Manby (ENG)** (18)	3	2	1	13	7	6	4	91.63	Q
3	Zac Griffiths (ENG)	3	1	2	7	13	–6	2	80.08	
4	Keelan Kay (ENG)	3	0	3	4	15	–11	0	76.96	

==== Group 21 ====
Pos.	Player	P	W	L	LF	LA	+/−	Pts	Avg	Status
1	**Cam Crabtree (ENG)** (7)	3	3	0	15	3	12	6	91.55	Q
2	**Ciaran Forde (ENG)**	3	2	1	10	5	5	4	77.00	Q
3	William Bristow (ENG)	3	1	2	5	11	–6	2	73.44	
4	Nicholas Cripps (CAN)	3	0	3	4	15	–11	0	73.41	

==== Group 22 ====
Pos.	Player	P	W	L	LF	LA	+/−	Pts	Avg	Status
1	**Bram van Dijk (NED)**	3	3	0	15	9	6	6	83.87	Q
2	**Lok Yin Lee (HKG)**	3	2	1	13	10	3	4	79.70	Q
3	Bradley van der Velden (NED)	3	1	2	10	13	–3	2	72.22	
4	Jannis Barkhausen (GER) (26)	3	0	3	9	15	–6	0	79.16	

==== Group 23 ====
Pos.	Player	P	W	L	LF	LA	+/−	Pts	Avg	Status
1	**Nunjo Dewaele (BEL)**	3	3	0	15	4	11	6	78.14	Q
2	**Jamai van den Herik (NED)** (10)	3	2	1	12	6	6	4	91.81	Q
3	Jack Howarth (ENG)	3	1	2	7	14	–7	2	77.03	
4	Brad Phillips (ENG)	3	0	3	5	15	–10	0	72.50	

==== Group 24 ====
Pos.	Player	P	W	L	LF	LA	+/−	Pts	Avg	Status
1	**Jack Drayton (ENG)**	3	3	0	15	5	10	6	87.71	Q
2	**Jenson Walker (ENG)** (23)	3	2	1	12	7	5	4	83.69	Q
3	Daniel Stephenson (ENG)	3	1	2	10	11	–1	2	82.42	
4	Gavin Nicoll (USA)	3	0	3	1	15	–14	0	73.63	

==== Group 25 ====
Pos.	Player	P	W	L	LF	LA	+/−	Pts	Avg	Status
1	**Keane Barry (IRE)** (3)	3	3	0	15	6	9	6	85.11	Q
2	**James Buckby (ENG)**	3	2	1	14	10	4	4	80.07	Q
3	Dylan Quinn (IRE)	3	1	2	8	10	–2	2	77.11	
4	Pim van Bijnen (NED)	3	0	3	4	15	–11	0	75.65	

==== Group 26 ====
Pos.	Player	P	W	L	LF	LA	+/−	Pts	Avg	Status
1	**Jack Sheppard (NZL)**	3	3	0	15	5	10	6	79.94	Q
2	**Levy Frauenfelder (NED)** (30)	3	2	1	11	11	0	4	77.75	Q
3	Justin Hewitt (GIB)	3	1	2	13	10	3	2	76.64	
4	Carl van Mens (GER)	3	0	3	2	15	–13	0	64.94	

==== Group 27 ====
Pos.	Player	P	W	L	LF	LA	+/−	Pts	Avg	Status
1	**Jarno Bottenberg (NED)** (14)	3	3	0	15	9	6	6	79.72	Q
2	**Kyle Manton (ENG)**	3	2	1	12	12	0	4	78.62	Q
3	Ondrej Frystacky (CZE)	3	1	2	12	11	1	2	77.59	
4	Eleanor Cairns (ENG)	3	0	3	8	15	–7	0	75.34	

==== Group 28 ====
Pos.	Player	P	W	L	LF	LA	+/−	Pts	Avg	Status
1	**Adam Gawlas (CZE)** (19)	3	3	0	15	2	13	6	89.14	Q
2	**Coby Jones-Swanson (ENG)**	3	2	1	11	12	-1	4	73.99	Q
3	Ieuan Halsall (WAL)	3	1	2	8	13	-5	2	84.03	
4	Stef Kosters (NED)	3	0	3	8	15	–7	0	80.06	

==== Group 29 ====
Pos.	Player	P	W	L	LF	LA	+/−	Pts	Avg	Status
1	**Owen Bates (ENG)** (6)	3	3	0	15	8	7	6	82.28	Q
2	**Lewis Gurney (ENG)**	3	2	1	12	10	2	4	75.28	Q
3	Travis Baur (NIR)	3	1	2	8	13	-5	2	73.45	
4	Kieran Thompson (ENG)	3	0	3	11	15	–4	0	71.72	

==== Group 30 ====
Pos.	Player	P	W	L	LF	LA	+/−	Pts	Avg	Status
1	**Patrik Williams (ENG)** (27)	3	3	0	15	4	11	6	88.13	Q
2	**Duyane-Wade Decena (PHI)**	3	2	1	13	10	3	4	88.50	Q
3	Daan Bastiaansen (NED)	3	1	2	10	12	-2	2	81.21	
4	Huey de Jong (NED)	3	0	3	3	15	–12	0	74.58	

==== Group 31 ====
Pos.	Player	P	W	L	LF	LA	+/−	Pts	Avg	Status
1	**Roy Rietbergen (NED)**	3	3	0	15	8	7	6	83.61	Q
2	**Ralfs Laumanis (LAT)**	3	2	1	12	9	3	4	81.03	Q
3	Viktor Tingström (SWE) (11)	3	1	2	10	11	-1	2	78.64	
4	Trevor Pettigrew (CAN)	3	0	3	6	15	–9	0	70.86	

==== Group 32 ====
Pos.	Player	P	W	L	LF	LA	+/−	Pts	Avg	Status
1	**Joshua Hermann (GER)** (22)	3	2	1	14	8	6	4	75.17	Q
2	**Dean Fitch (SCO)**	3	2	1	11	10	1	4	78.91	Q
3	Florian Preis (GER)	3	1	2	11	13	-2	2	77.08	
4	Justin van der Velden (NED)	3	0	3	9	14	–15	2	72.22	

=== Knockout stage ===
Numbers to the left of a player's name show the seedings for the top 32 players in the tournament. Figures to the right of a player's name show their three-dart average in a match. Players in bold denote match winners.

**Last 64** (best of 11 legs); 13 October
**1**	**Luke Littler 102.38**	**6**
Tom Garfield 80.79	2
Charlie Large 75.94	1
**Ronan McDonagh 82.83**	**6**
16	Henry Coates 89.90	2
**18**	**Charlie Manby 95.07**	**6**
17	Nathan Girvan 63.30	0
**Jurjen van der Velde 109.98**	**6**
8	Dominik Grüllich 87.70	2
**Lok Yin Lee 83.12**	**6**
JJ Wright 84.81	5
**Ciaran Forde 84.34**	**6**
**9**	**Leon Weber 85.93**	**6**
23	Jenson Walker 78.10	1
24	Ryan Branley 81.52	5
**10**	**Jamai van den Herik 83.23**	**6**
**4**	**Dylan Slevin 79.84**	**6**
Levy Frauenfelder 75.36	4
**Tyler Thorpe 84.34**	**6**
James Buckby 75.71	2
**13**	**Beau Greaves 96.97**	**6**
Coby Jones-Swanson 76.00	0
**Danny Jansen 83.91**	**6**
Kyle Manton 84.79	5
**Justin Atellinghusen 81.34**	**6**
Duyane-Wade Decena 79.69	4
Dylan Dowling 79.57	4
**Lewis Gurney 72.78**	**6**
**12**	**Tavis Dudeney 75.77**	**6**
Dean Fitch Jr 80.31	5
**21**	**Liam Maendl-Lawrance 81.88**	**6**
Ralfs Laumanis 77.79	3
**2**	**Gian van Veen 94.52**	**6**
32	Damian Vetjens 87.15	2
Shusaku Nakamura 80.34	4
**Jeffrey Keen 84.23**	**6**
**Aidan O'Hara 80.27**	**6**
Ben Edgar 68.98	1
Cole Davey 84.59	5
**Kilian Hohnstedt 82.03**	**6**
**7**	**Cam Crabtree 82.82**	**6**
Keenan Thomas 78.70	5
**Bram van Dijk 85.75**	**6**
Jarod Becker 71.46	1
**Nunjo Dewaele 78.90**	**6**
Sean McKeon 75.87	5
Jack Drayton 94.32	5
**Daniel Perry 89.85**	**6**
**3**	**Keane Barry 85.50**	**6**
Mark Tabak 74.32	4
Jack Sheppard 75.02	3
**Finley Pember 77.37**	**6**
14	Jarno Bottenberg 73.33	2
**Cayden Smith 79.45**	**6**
19	**Adam Gawlas**	**w/o**
Noah Röschlein
6	Owen Bates 80.21	4
**28**	**Nathan Potter 85.90**	**6**
27	Patrik Williams 86.59	4
**5**	**Sebastian Białecki 90.27**	**6**
**Roy Rietbergen 76.80**	**6**
Mitchell Leeming 74.79	3
22	Joshua Hermann 75.79	1
**Jack Gillett 80.19**	**6**

**Last 32** (best of 11 legs); 13 October
**1**	**Luke Littler 93.70**	**6**
Ronan McDonagh 81.66	1
**18**	**Charlie Manby 88.76**	**6**
15	Jurjen van der Velde 87.54	4
**Lok Yin Lee 84.07**	**6**
Ciaran Forde 71.62	1
9	Leon Weber 82.63	0
**10**	**Jamai van den Herik 91.09**	**6**
4	Dylan Slevin 93.61	4
**29**	**Tyler Thorpe 93.38**	**6**
**13**	**Beau Greaves 93.26**	**6**
Danny Jansen 82.02	2
Justin Atellinghusen 71.77	2
**Lewis Gurney 72.21**	**6**
12	Tavis Dudeney 81.88	3
**21**	**Liam Maendl-Lawrance 92.53**	**6**
**2**	**Gian van Veen 94.93**	**6**
Jeffrey Keen 89.97	0
**Aidan O'Hara 81.88**	**6**
Kilian Hohnstedt 76.04	2
**7**	**Cam Crabtree 95.38**	**6**
Bram van Dijk 90.59	4
**Nunjo Dewaele 76.26**	**6**
Daniel Perry 79.80	4
**3**	**Keane Barry 85.28**	**6**
Finley Pember 80.58	4
Cayden Smith 77.22	1
**19**	**Adam Gawlas 92.89**	**6**
28	Nathan Potter 97.35	3
**5**	**Sebastian Białecki 95.28**	**6**
**Roy Rietbergen 81.23**	**6**
Jack Gillett 79.35	3

**Last 16** (best of 11 legs); 13 October
**1**	**Littler 103.46**	**6**
18	Manby 102.35	5
Lee 83.67	3
**10**	**Van den Herik 87.40**	**6**
29	Thorpe 87.67	4
**13**	**Greaves 99.29**	**6**
Gurney 72.68	2
**21**	**Maendl-Lawrance 80.82**	**6**
**2**	**van Veen 90.40**	**6**
O'Hara 88.64	5
**7**	**Crabtree 85.41**	**6**
Dewaele 85.10	5
**3**	**Barry 91.84**	**6**
19	Gawlas 85.26	3
**5**	**Białecki 86.06**	**6**
Rietbergen 87.61	5

**Quarter-finals** (best of 11 legs); 13 October
**1**	**Littler 105.61**	**6**
10	Van den Herik 95.90	1
**13**	**Greaves 95.32**	**6**
21	Maendl-Lawrance 92.43	2
**2**	**van Veen 99.45**	**6**
7	Crabtree 87.61	2
3	Barry 91.94	5
**5**	**Białecki 92.25**	**6**

**Semi-finals** (best of 11 legs); 13 October
1	Littler 107.40	5
**13**	**Greaves 105.02**	**6**
**2**	**van Veen 93.51**	**6**
Białecki 85.91	4

**Final** (best of 11 legs); 23 November
13	Greaves 90.42	3
**2**	**van Veen 96.55**	**6**
