= 2024 PDC Challenge Tour =

Darts tournament series

The 2024 PDC Challenge Tour (known for sponsorship reasons as the Winmau Challenge Tour) was a series of non-televised darts tournaments organised by the Professional Darts Corporation (PDC). A secondary tour to the PDC Pro Tour, it consisted of 24 tournaments, held over four weekends of five events and one weekend of four events.

The Challenge Tour is the PDC's second-tier system for players who competed at the 2024 Qualifying Schools but did not win a PDC Tour Card.

== Prize money ==
This is how the prize money was divided:

£360,000 was the total prize fund, with £15,000 being the prize fund for each of the 24 CT events.

Stage (no. of players)		Prize money (Total: £15,000)
Winner	(1)	£2,500
Runner-up	(1)	£1,000
Semi-finalists	(2)	£750
Quarter-finalists	(4)	£500
Last 16	(8)	£300
Last 32	(16)	£200
Last 64	(32)	£75

The top players on the Challenge Tour Order of Merit act as reserves for 2024 PDC Players Championship series events. If one of the Tour Card holders does not enter or withdraws from a Players Championship event, the highest ranked available player on the Challenge Tour Order of Merit may fill in.

== January ==
=== Challenge Tour 1 ===
Challenge Tour 1 was contested on 19 January 2024. The tournament was won by Richie Burnett.

Quarter-finals (best of 9 legs)
Franz Rötzsch 87.24	5
Connor Scutt 88.08	2
Darryl Pilgrim 97.43	5
Conan Whitehead 87.77	1
Reece Colley 93.48	4
Richie Burnett 91.14	5
Stefan Bellmont 93.13	5
Jarno Bottenberg 83.67	1

Semi-finals (best of 9 legs)
Franz Rötzsch 91.16	2
Darryl Pilgrim 100.91	5
Richie Burnett 82.03	5
Stefan Bellmont 89.42	3

Final (best of 9 legs)
Darryl Pilgrim 96.86	4
Richie Burnett 89.50	5

=== Challenge Tour 2 ===
Challenge Tour 2 was contested on 19 January 2024. The tournament was won by Danny Jansen.

Quarter-finals (best of 9 legs)
Devon Petersen 77.84	2
Adam Paxton 89.18	5
Darryl Pilgrim 86.01	5
Trevor Burkhill 81.72	2
Danny Jansen 94.71	5
Ross Montgomery 83.43	2
John Henderson 106.16	5
Romeo Grbavac 95.74	2

Semi-finals (best of 9 legs)
Adam Paxton 85.43	1
Darryl Pilgrim 91.57	5
Danny Jansen 94.75	5
John Henderson 95.28	3

Final (best of 9 legs)
Darryl Pilgrim 97.96	3
Danny Jansen 96.37	5

=== Challenge Tour 3 ===
Challenge Tour 3 was contested on 20 January 2024. The tournament was won by Oskar Lukasiak.

Quarter-finals (best of 9 legs)
Danny Jansen 86.38	5
Darryl Pilgrim 87.67	0
Daniel Ayres 83.98	5
Thomas Lovely 92.57	4
Oskar Lukasiak 90.74	5
Chris Quantock 88.65	4
Ted Evetts 88.10	5
Dragutin Horvat 85.06	2

Semi-finals (best of 9 legs)
Danny Jansen 89.46	5
Daniel Ayres 74.38	0
Oskar Lukasiak 98.73	5
Ted Evetts 90.03	2

Final (best of 9 legs)
Danny Jansen 86.95	3
Oskar Lukasiak 81.98	5

=== Challenge Tour 4 ===
Challenge Tour 4 was contested on 20 January 2024. The tournament was won by Stefan Bellmont.

Quarter-finals (best of 9 legs)
Darryl Pilgrim 88.35	5
Arjan Konterman 83.66	3
Pál Székely 78.74	5
Martin Grearson 75.90	2
James Beeton 89.46	4
Aden Kirk 89.04	5
Stefan Bellmont 97.16	5
Andy Boulton 80.95	3

Semi-finals (best of 9 legs)
Darryl Pilgrim 94.42	4
Pál Székely 93.02	5
Aden Kirk 96.83	2
Stefan Bellmont 99.06	5

Final (best of 9 legs)
Pál Székely 75.31	0
Stefan Bellmont 86.38	5

=== Challenge Tour 5 ===
Challenge Tour 5 was contested on 21 January 2024. The tournament was won by Aden Kirk.

Quarter-finals (best of 9 legs)
Reece Colley 95.44	3
Darius Labanauskas 95.17	5
Danny Jansen 86.79	5
Jimmy van Schie 88.03	3
Wesley Plaisier 94.07	5
Ron Meulenkamp 97.65	2
Andy Hamilton 76.52	4
Aden Kirk 80.31	5

Semi-finals (best of 9 legs)
Darius Labanauskas 84.77	2
Danny Jansen 93.92	5
Wesley Plaisier 94.48	4
Aden Kirk 90.96	5

Final (best of 9 legs)
Danny Jansen 87.43	3
Aden Kirk 85.67	5

== March ==
=== Challenge Tour 6 ===
Challenge Tour 6 took place on 15 March 2024. The tournament was won by Noa-Lynn van Leuven.

Quarter-finals (best of 9 legs)
John Henderson 93.56	3
Noa-Lynn van Leuven 92.14	5
Charlie Martin 88.14	1
Cam Crabtree 106.64	5
Tytus Kanik 89.27	5
Sebastian Białecki 82.27	1
Aden Kirk 97.56	5
Danny Jansen 88.43	2

Semi-finals (best of 9 legs)
Noa-Lynn van Leuven 93.88	5
Cam Crabtree 96.61	2
Tytus Kanik 86.18	5
Aden Kirk 82.86	4

Final (best of 9 legs)
Noa-Lynn van Leuven 100.97	5
Tytus Kanik 88.18	3

=== Challenge Tour 7 ===
Challenge Tour 7 took place on 15 March 2024. The tournament was won by René Eidams.

Quarter-finals (best of 9 legs)
Connor Scutt 85.39	2
Andreas Harrysson 93.16	5
Dennie Olde Kalter 94.56	5
Shane McGuirk 89.82	4
Cam Crabtree 87.34	4
René Eidams 88.50	5
Kevin Burness 86.24	5
Kai Gotthardt 82.78	2

Semi-finals (best of 9 legs)
Andreas Harrysson 81.94	3
Dennie Olde Kalter 84.75	5
René Eidams 97.37	5
Kevin Burness 92.39	1

Final (best of 9 legs)
Dennie Olde Kalter 89.47	4
René Eidams 87.99	5

=== Challenge Tour 8 ===
Challenge Tour 8 took place on 16 March 2024. The tournament was won by Andy Boulton.

Quarter-finals (best of 9 legs)
Oskar Lukasiak 77.01	2
Grant Brown 82.68	5
Danny Jansen 90.85	5
Patrick Peters 85.60	3
James Parkin 79.72	1
Shane McGuirk 84.00	5
Andy Boulton 95.13	5
Thomas Lovely 84.28	0

Semi-finals (best of 9 legs)
Grant Brown 77.07	0
Danny Jansen 86.38	5
Shane McGuirk 90.92	2
Andy Boulton 90.25	5

Final (best of 9 legs)
Danny Jansen 98.52	0
Andy Boulton 101.55	5

=== Challenge Tour 9 ===
Challenge Tour 9 took place on 16 March 2024. The tournament was won by Andy Boulton.

Quarter-finals (best of 9 legs)
John Henderson 90.05	4
Jamie Atkins 89.37	5
Stefan Bellmont 82.19	0
Kai Gotthardt 91.65	5
Scott Mitchell 84.12	2
Kevin Burness 94.21	5
Andy Boulton 84.36	5
Jesús Noguera 85.29	1

Semi-finals (best of 9 legs)
Jamie Atkins 91.68	5
Kai Gotthardt 89.03	3
Andy Boulton 84.36	4
Kevin Burness 86.22	5

Final (best of 9 legs)
Jamie Atkins 92.27	4
Andy Boulton 89.87	5

=== Challenge Tour 10 ===
Challenge Tour 10 took place on 17 March 2024. The tournament was won by Lee Cocks.

Quarter-finals (best of 9 legs)
Wesley Plaisier 82.11	5
Jesús Noguera 79.20	4
Scott Mitchell 86.79	3
John Henderson 98.97	5
Lee Cocks 88.91	5
Mike Warburton 94.89	4
Alexander Merkx 91.27	1
Derk Telnekes 94.01	5

Semi-finals (best of 9 legs)
Wesley Plaisier 94.42	5
John Henderson 84.33	1
Lee Cocks 77.17	5
Derk Telnekes 80.31	3

Final (best of 9 legs)
Wesley Plaisier 85.50	0
Lee Cocks 93.94	5

== June ==
=== Challenge Tour 11 ===
Challenge Tour 11 took place on 7 June 2024. The tournament was won by Christian Kist, who hit a nine-dart finish in his last 16 match against Darren Armstrong.Henry Coates also hit a nine–darter in his loss to Stephen Haggerty.

Quarter-finals (best of 9 legs)
Michael Unterbuchner 96.09	5
Connor Scutt 97.33	4
Reece Colley 96.22	5
Thomas Cromwell 88.64	3
Christian Kist 93.54	5
Bradley Brooks 89.03	1
Cam Crabtree 96.36	5
Jimmy van Schie 95.53	3

Semi-finals (best of 9 legs)
Michael Unterbuchner 94.30	5
Reece Colley 91.02	4
Christian Kist 96.35	5
Cam Crabtree 69.20	0

Final (best of 9 legs)
Michael Unterbuchner 86.12	4
Christian Kist 93.32	5

=== Challenge Tour 12 ===
Challenge Tour 12 took place on 7 June 2024. Christian Kist won a second consecutive Challenge Tour tournament.

Quarter-finals (best of 9 legs)
Michael Busscher 79.39	1
John Henderson 93.66	5
Robert Thornton 81.69	3
Andreas Harrysson 87.30	5
Jamie Atkins 93.66	2
Christian Kist 93.80	5
David Evans 82.78	0
Ted Evetts 87.38	5

Semi-finals (best of 9 legs)
John Henderson 96.76	5
Andreas Harrysson 90.53	3
Christian Kist 90.59	5
Ted Evetts 89.88	2

Final (best of 9 legs)
John Henderson 100.55	3
Christian Kist 102.39	5

=== Challenge Tour 13 ===
Challenge Tour 13 took place on 8 June 2024. The tournament was won by Connor Scutt.

Quarter-finals (best of 9 legs)
Liam Goyne 89.10	5
Noa-Lynn van Leuven 88.76	2
Wayne Jones 74.85	3
Dragutin Horvat 85.77	5
Connor Scutt 109.93	5
Bradley Brooks 93.38	2
Kai Gotthardt 87.08	4
Richie Burnett 84.46	5

Semi-finals (best of 9 legs)
Liam Goyne 81.32	2
Dragutin Horvat 91.85	5
Connor Scutt 100.36	5
Richie Burnett 91.15	4

Final (best of 9 legs)
Dragutin Horvat 81.88	0
Connor Scutt 93.94	5

=== Challenge Tour 14 ===
Challenge Tour 14 took place on 8 June 2024. The tournament was won by Justin Hood.

Quarter-finals (best of 9 legs)
Sebastian Białecki 90.92	3
David Evans 83.77	5
Dragutin Horvat 89.18	5
Stefaan Henderyck 83.14	3
John Henderson 86.88	0
Christian Kist 96.35	5
Jarno Bottenberg 81.96	0
Justin Hood 93.94	5

Semi-finals (best of 9 legs)
David Evans 93.28	3
Dragutin Horvat 99.52	5
Christian Kist 86.14	3
Justin Hood 86.65	5

Final (best of 9 legs)
Dragutin Horvat 89.62	1
Justin Hood 107.24	5

=== Challenge Tour 15 ===
Challenge Tour 15 took place on 9 June 2024. The tournament was won by Wesley Plaisier.

Quarter-finals (best of 9 legs)
Dragutin Horvat 83.06	5
Colin Osborne 84.64	2
Dominik Grüllich 78.92	3
Damian Mol 79.59	5
Wesley Plaisier 101.55	5
Darren Armstrong 81.09	0
Sean Fisher 88.05	3
Sebastian Białecki 91.62	5

Semi-finals (best of 9 legs)
Dragutin Horvat 88.46	2
Damian Mol 92.41	5
Wesley Plaisier 98.42	5
Sebastian Białecki 87.47	3

Final (best of 9 legs)
Damian Mol 84.93	4
Wesley Plaisier 89.79	5

== August ==
=== Challenge Tour 16 ===
Challenge Tour 16 was contested on 16 August 2024. The tournament was won by Alexander Merkx.

Quarter-finals (best of 9 legs)
Alexander Merkx 90.52	5
Martin Grearson 89.78	2
Carl Wilson 94.25	5
René Eidams 81.65	2
Justin Hood 84.86	4
Stefaan Henderyck 90.65	5
Wesley Plaisier 80.22	5
Franz Rötzsch 79.07	3

Semi-finals (best of 9 legs)
Alexander Merkx 84.31	5
Carl Wilson 78.04	4
Stefaan Henderyck 81.47	3
Wesley Plaisier 80.61	5

Final (best of 9 legs)
Alexander Merkx 90.98	5
Wesley Plaisier 86.22	3

=== Challenge Tour 17 ===
Challenge Tour 17 was contested on 16 August 2024. The tournament was won by Connor Scutt.

Quarter-finals (best of 9 legs)
John O'Shea 82.41	2
Dominik Grüllich 94.98	5
Tom Sykes 91.75	5
Bradley Brooks 78.64	2
David Davies 80.68	2
Carl Wilson 8.966	5
Darius Labanauskas 86.16	1
Connor Scutt 93.66	5

Semi-finals (best of 9 legs)
Dominik Grüllich 87.69	1
Tom Sykes 91.26	5
Carl Wilson 93.49	3
Connor Scutt 101.84	5

Final (best of 9 legs)
Tom Sykes 80.70	3
Connor Scutt 85.17	5

=== Challenge Tour 18 ===
Challenge Tour 18 was contested on 17 August 2024. The tournament was won by Jimmy van Schie.

Quarter-finals (best of 9 legs)
Dennie Olde Kalter 88.41	5
Wesley Plaisier 87.73	0
Cam Crabtree 79.20	3
Jimmy van Schie 88.88	5
Tom Lonsdale 90.11	5
Darius Labanauskas 87.27	4
Daniel Ayres 91.87	5
Riccardo Castelli 72.00	1

Semi-finals (best of 9 legs)
Dennie Olde Kalter 78.69	1
Jimmy van Schie 92.06	5
Tom Lonsdale 84.65	4
Daniel Ayres 83.72	5

Final (best of 9 legs)
Jimmy van Schie 96.15	5
Daniel Ayres 83.45	4

=== Challenge Tour 19 ===
Challenge Tour 19 was contested on 17 August 2024. The tournament was won by Wesley Plaisier.

Quarter-finals (best of 9 legs)
Jimmy van Schie 89.72	5
Anton Östlund 90.58	2
Andy Hamilton 86.41	3
Wesley Plaisier 90.02	5
Lee Cocks 92.24	5
Andy Boulton 95.32	4
Charlie Martin 86.66	5
Connor Scutt 92.04	4

Semi-finals (best of 9 legs)
Jimmy van Schie 80.86	3
Wesley Plaisier 90.23	5
Lee Cocks 92.10	5
Charlie Martin 93.95	2

Final (best of 9 legs)
Wesley Plaisier 96.67	5
Lee Cocks 88.96	3

=== Challenge Tour 20 ===
Challenge Tour 20 was contested on 18 August 2024. The tournament was won by Christian Kist.

Quarter-finals (best of 9 legs)
Derk Telnekes 88.27	5
Thomas Banks 83.79	2
Christian Kist 85.05	5
John O'Shea 80.21	2
Connor Scutt 103.98	5
Justin Hood 94.91	1
Thomas Lovely 93.57	5
Ryan O'Connor 90.02	4

Semi-finals (best of 9 legs)
Derk Telnekes 85.03	2
Christian Kist 88.49	5
Connor Scutt 97.43	5
Thomas Lovely 90.15	3

Final (best of 9 legs)
Christian Kist 99.45	5
Connor Scutt 91.87	2

== November ==
=== Challenge Tour 21 ===
Challenge Tour 21 was contested on 2 November 2024. The tournament was won by Alexander Merkx.

Quarter-finals (best of 9 legs)
Thomas Lovely 85.76	4
Alexander Merkx 96.13	5
Franz Rötzsch 84.86	5
Justin Hood 91.74	4
Darryl Pilgrim 84.92	5
Stefan Bellmont 80.16	2
Shane McGuirk 82.36	1
Dragutin Horvat 83.48	5

Semi-finals (best of 9 legs)
Alexander Merkx 87.62	5
Franz Rötzsch 75.70	1
Darryl Pilgrim 93.94	5
Dragutin Horvat 80.04	0

Final (best of 9 legs)
Alexander Merkx 92.83	5
Darryl Pilgrim 85.88	3

=== Challenge Tour 22 ===
Challenge Tour 22 was contested on 2 November 2024. The tournament was won by Andreas Harrysson.

Quarter-finals (best of 9 legs)
Daniel Ayres 88.31	3
Stefaan Henderyck 88.74	5
Alexander Merkx 93.78	4
Darius Labanauskas 88.20	5
Franz Rötzsch 84.52	3
Sebastian Białecki 87.41	5
Andreas Harrysson 95.50	5
Aden Kirk 91.43	2

Semi-finals (best of 9 legs)
Stefaan Henderyck 82.74	5
Darius Labanauskas 77.75	4
Sebastian Białecki 95.55	3
Andreas Harrysson 89.98	5

Final (best of 9 legs)
Stefaan Henderyck 86.91	2
Andreas Harrysson 93.92	5

=== Challenge Tour 23 ===
Challenge Tour 23 was contested on 3 November 2024. The tournament was won by Andreas Harrysson.

Quarter-finals (best of 9 legs)
Stefan Bellmont 88.32	3
Connor Scutt 92.56	5
Alexander Merkx 98.90	3
Richie Burnett 82.03	3
Andreas Harrysson 97.02	5
Darius Labanauskas 89.46	3
Wesley Plaisier 90.42	4
Kai Gotthardt 94.53	5

Semi-finals (best of 9 legs)
Connor Scutt 100.76	5
Alexander Merkx 86.97	3
Andreas Harrysson 81.68	5
Kai Gotthardt 71.57	0

Final (best of 9 legs)
Connor Scutt 85.17	3
Andreas Harrysson 96.74	5

=== Challenge Tour 24 ===
Challenge Tour 24 was contested on 3 November 2024. The tournament was won by Sebastian Białecki.

Quarter-finals (best of 9 legs)
Darryl Pilgrim 91.88	5
Cam Crabtree 90.20	3
John Henderson 91.43	4
Ted Evetts 94.09	5
Adam Paxton 87.74	5
Carl Wilson 86.90	4
Callum Francis 88.15	4
Sebastian Białecki 89.75	5

Semi-finals (best of 9 legs)
Darryl Pilgrim 84.58	3
Ted Evetts 86.59	5
Adam Paxton 86.90	3
Sebastian Białecki 91.90	5

Final (best of 9 legs)
Ted Evetts 80.98	4
Sebastian Białecki 90.71	5

== Order of Merit ==
2024 Challenge Tour final ranking after 24 events
Rank	Player	Prize money
1	Connor Scutt (Note: Qualified for 2025 PDC World Darts Championship via another method.) (Note: Qualified for 2025 Tour Card via another method.)	£11,325
2	Wesley Plaisier	£10,650
3	Christian Kist	£9,425
4	Alexander Merkx	£8,300
5	Andreas Harrysson	£7,975
6	Danny Jansen	£7,600
7	Sebastian Białecki	£7,000
8	Andy Boulton	£6,750
9	Darryl Pilgrim	£6,625
10	Jimmy van Schie	£6,200

Qualifications earned through Challenge Tour
2024 Grand Slam of Darts
2025 PDC World Championship and 2025–26 Tour Card
2025-26 Tour Card
2025 PDC World Championship
