= 2022 European Darts Grand Prix =

2022 edition of European Darts Grand Prix

2022 Interwetten European Darts Grand Prix

Tournament information
- Dates: 20–22 May 2022
- Venue: Hanns-Martin-Schleyer-Halle
- Location: Stuttgart, Germany
- Organisation(s): Professional Darts Corporation (PDC)
- Format: Legs
- Prize fund: £140,000
- Winner's share: £25,000
- High checkout: 170 Rob Cross

Champion(s)
- Luke Humphries

The 2022 European Darts Grand Prix (known for sponsorship reasons as the 2022 Interwetten German Darts Grand Prix) was the seventh of thirteen PDC European Tour events on the 2022 PDC Pro Tour. The tournament took place at the Hanns-Martin-Schleyer-Halle, Stuttgart, Germany, from 20 to 22 May 2022. It featured a field of 48 players and £140,000 in prize money, with £25,000 going to the winner.

José de Sousa was the defending champion after defeating Michael van Gerwen 8–4 in the 2020 final, but lost in the second round 6–5 to Andrew Gilding.

Luke Humphries won his third European Tour title of 2022, defeating Rob Cross 8–7 in a repeat of the final from the previous European Tour event a week earlier.

The original venue for this tournament was the Glaspalast in Sindelfingen, but it was being used as accommodation for Ukrainian refugees fleeing from the Russian invasion of Ukraine.

== Prize money ==
The prize money is unchanged from the European Tours of the last 3 years:

Stage (num. of players)		Prize money
Winner	(1)	£25,000
Runner-up	(1)	£10,000
Semi-finalists	(2)	£6,500
Quarter-finalists	(4)	£5,000
Third round losers	(8)	£3,000
Second round losers	(16)	£2,000*
First round losers	(16)	£1,000*
Total	£140,000	

- Seeded players who lose in the second round and host nation qualifiers (who qualify automatically as a result of their ranking) who lose in their first match of the event shall not be credited with prize money on any Order of Merit. A player who qualifies as a qualifier, but later becomes a seed due to the withdrawal of one or more other players shall be credited with their prize money on all Orders of Merit regardless of how far they progress in the event.

== Qualification and format ==
The top 16 entrants from the PDC ProTour Order of Merit on 29 March automatically qualified for the event and were seeded in the second round.

The remaining 32 places went to players from six qualifying events – 24 from the Tour Card Holder Qualifier (held on 8 April), two from the Associate Member Qualifier (held on 22 April), the two highest ProTour ranking German players, two from the Host Nation Qualifier (held on 22 April), one from the Nordic & Baltic Associate Member Qualifier (held on 19 February), and one from the East European Associate Member Qualifier (held on 23 April).

Top seed Gerwyn Price withdrew from the event, so Martin Schindler became a seed and Eddie Lovely received a bye into the second round.

The following players took part in the tournament:

Top 16

1. Michael van Gerwen (second round)
2. José de Sousa (second round)
3. Peter Wright (semi-finals)
4. Joe Cullen (second round)
5. Rob Cross (runner-up)
6. Michael Smith (second round)
7. Dimitri Van den Bergh (second round)
8. Damon Heta (semi-finals)
9. Ryan Searle (third round)
10. Luke Humphries (champion)
11. Dirk van Duijvenbode (second round)
12. Krzysztof Ratajski (third round)
13. Daryl Gurney (third round)
14. Jonny Clayton (third round)
15. Brendan Dolan (quarter-finals)
16. Martin Schindler (quarter-finals)

Tour Card Qualifier
- Ryan Meikle (second round)
- Danny Jansen (second round)
- Stephen Bunting (first round)
- Martijn Kleermaker (first round)
- Eddie Lovely (second round)
- Radek Szagański (first round)
- Martin Lukeman (third round)
- Mickey Mansell (second round)
- Jim Williams (first round)
- Ryan Joyce (first round)
- Danny Noppert (quarter-finals)
- Nathan Rafferty (third round)
- Niels Zonneveld (first round)
- Joe Murnan (third round)
- Kim Huybrechts (second round)
- Rowby-John Rodriguez (quarter-finals)
- Adrian Lewis (second round)
- Andrew Gilding (third round)
- Callan Rydz (first round)
- John Michael (first round)
- Adam Gawlas (second round)
- Luke Woodhouse (first round)
- Madars Razma (second round)
- Ron Meulenkamp (first round)

Associate Member Qualifier
- Jelle Klaasen (second round)
- Stefan Bellmont (first round)

Highest Ranked Germans
- Gabriel Clemens (first round)

Host Nation Qualifier
- Dragutin Horvat (first round)
- Lukas Wenig (first round)

Nordic & Baltic Qualifier
- Johan Engström (second round)

East European Qualifier
- Karel Sedláček (first round)

== Draw ==
First round (best of 11 legs); 20 May
Stefan Bellmont 87.14	3
Martin Lukeman 97.19	6
Madars Razma 87.05	6
Niels Zonneveld 94.17	5
Radek Szagański 88.35	1
Mickey Mansell 96.31	6
Adam Gawlas 100.30	6
Ryan Joyce 96.70	3
Jim Williams 91.75	5
Rowby-John Rodriguez 90.10	6
Eddie Lovely	bye
Jelle Klaasen 95.73	6
Callan Rydz 87.48	4
Kim Huybrechts 88.04	6
Stephen Bunting 86.96	5
Andrew Gilding 95.59	6
John Michael 81.25	1
Martijn Kleermaker 85.72	1
Danny Jansen 93.70	6
Joe Murnan 94.93	6
Lukas Wenig 81.94	0
Ryan Meikle 93.74	6
Ron Meulenkamp 82.90	2
Gabriel Clemens 94.00	5
Johan Engström 88.51	6
Luke Woodhouse 91.06	5
Adrian Lewis 91.54	6
Karel Sedláček 86.23	3
Danny Noppert 92.51	6
Nathan Rafferty 88.76	6
Dragutin Horvat 87.63	3

Second round (best of 11 legs); 21 May
1	Michael van Gerwen 89.77	1
Martin Lukeman 96.19	6
16	Martin Schindler 94.48	6
Madars Razma 89.07	2
8	Damon Heta 96.28	6
Mickey Mansell 94.36	5
9	Ryan Searle 95.40	6
Adam Gawlas 90.58	2
4	Joe Cullen 84.58	1
Rowby-John Rodriguez 89.45	6
13	Daryl Gurney 83.95	6
Eddie Lovely 77.60	4
5	Rob Cross 86.62	6
Jelle Klaasen 91.31	5
12	Krzysztof Ratajski 99.08	6
Kim Huybrechts 90.47	2
2	José de Sousa 84.27	5
Andrew Gilding 87.92	6
15	Brendan Dolan 96.08	6
Danny Jansen 90.10	4
7	Dimitri Van den Bergh 94.53	5
Joe Murnan 94.21	6
10	Luke Humphries 97.45	6
Ryan Meikle 92.49	5
3	Peter Wright 91.06	6
Johan Engström 85.81	2
14	Jonny Clayton 93.09	6
Adrian Lewis 91.00	3
6	Michael Smith 103.02	4
Danny Noppert 102.46	6
11	Dirk van Duijvenbode 95.95	3
Nathan Rafferty 101.76	6

Third round (best of 11 legs); 22 May
Lukeman 86.84	5
16	Schindler 89.08	6
8	Heta 101.80	6
9	Searle 98.92	5
Rodriguez 88.48	6
13	Gurney 84.91	3
5	Cross 98.85	6
12	Ratajski 106.39	4
Gilding 91.36	3
15	Dolan 89.37	6
Murnan 83.62	3
10	Humphries 90.81	6
3	Wright 103.00	6
14	Clayton 85.96	1
Noppert 104.93	6
Rafferty 100.84	4

Quarter-finals (best of 11 legs); 22 May
16	Schindler 99.21	5
8	Heta 92.60	6
Rodriguez 94.67	4
5	Cross 97.61	6
15	Dolan 84.30	0
10	Humphries 100.20	6
3	Wright 111.16	6
Noppert 104.06	1

Semi-finals (best of 13 legs); 22 May
8	Heta 97.82	4
5	Cross 110.73	7
10	Humphries 108.00	7
3	Wright 99.24	4

Final (best of 15 legs); 22 May
5	Cross 101.82	7
10	Humphries 102.33	8
