= Dominik Grüllich =

Personal information
- Born: 27 March 2002 (age 24) Pfaffenhofen, Germany
- Home town: Wolnzach, Germany

Sport
- Sport: Darts
- Playing since: 2018
- Darts: 23.5g Mission Signature
- Laterality: Right-handed
- Walk-on music: "Holy Atlantis" by Holy Priest

Organisation (see split in darts)
- PDC: 2018–present (Tour Card: 2025–present)
- WDF: 2019–2024
- Current world ranking: (PDC) 78 (29 October 2026)

WDF major events – best performances
- World Masters: Last 128: 2022

PDC premier events – best performances
- World Championship: Last 128: 2026
- UK Open: Last 32: 2026
Medal record
Men's Darts
Representing Germany
EDF European Championship
Gold medal – first place	2026 Podčetrtek	Men's doubles

Dominik Grüllich (born 27 March 2002) is a German professional darts player who competes in Professional Darts Corporation (PDC) events.

== Career ==
Grüllich gained his first experience in his regional association in Bavaria. He also regularly took part in tournaments organized by the DDV and was able to achieve some success there.

In 2019 Grüllich competed in World Darts Federation (WDF) events, he won his first title at the Sylt Classic Youth. Grüllich was also a member of the German national team at the WDF World Cup Youth, where he reached the quarter-finals of the singles competition and lost to Keelan Kay. He won the bronze medal in the mixed pairs competition, together with Suzan Atas. At the World Masters, he was eliminated in the youth tournament in the second round. At the 2022 World Masters, Grüllich reached the second round after getting through the group stage. In the second round match he lost to Johan Engström.

After problems with dartitis, Grüllich reached his first final on the PDC Development Tour in 2021. He was defeated by Nico Kurz. In the 2023 PDC Development Tour series, he reached a semi-final and a final twice. At the 2023 PDC World Youth Championship, he finished top of his group before he was eliminated by eventual finalist Gian van Veen. In October, he reached the quarter-finals of the 2023 PDC Europe Super League, where he was eliminated - again plagued by dartitis - against Lukas Wenig 6–0.

At the beginning of 2024, Grüllich missed out on a PDC Tour Card at the PDC Qualifying School when he missed several match darts. At the end of 2023, he was ranked in 16th place on the Development Tour rankings, which qualified him for the 2024 UK Open, but he was eliminated in the first round. At the beginning of June 2024, he was able to reach his first PDC Challenge Tour quarter-final in August he went a step further in the same tournament series by reaching the semi-finals. In October, Grüllich made his debut at the Players Championships as a reserve player, winning a match against Jelle Klaasen. At the 2024 PDC World Youth Championship he reached the last 16 where he lost to Dylan Slevin. At the PDC Europe Super League he made the semi-finals. Like the previous year, he reached the knockout stage and a win over Kevin Troppmann took him through to the next round. In the semi-finals, he lost to eventual winner Kai Gotthardt.

On 12 January 2025, he secured a PDC Tour Card for the 2025 PDC Pro Tour and 2026 PDC Pro Tour via the European Qualifying School ranking. On the 2025 PDC Development Tour he reached a final at event 7, and won his first two titles at events 10 and 21. At PDC Players Championship 14, Grüllich reached his first Pro Tour final. His run to the final included victories over Daryl Gurney, Dirk van Duijvenbode and Michael Smith before losing to Jonny Clayton in the final.

== World Championship results ==
=== PDC World Championship ===
- 2026: First round (lost to Jermaine Wattimena 2–3)

== Performance timeline ==
=== WDF ===
Tournament	2022
WDF Ranked televised events
World Masters	2R

=== PDC ===
Tournament	2023	2024	2025	2026
PDC Ranked televised events
World Championship	DNQ			1R
World Masters	DNQ		Prel.	Prel.
UK Open	DNQ	1R	3R	5R
PDC Non-ranked televised events
World Youth Championship	2R	3R	2R	2R
Career statistics
Season-end ranking	–	232	90	

=== PDC European Tour ===
Tournament	2025	2026
European Darts Trophy	1R	DNQ
European Darts Open	DNQ	1R

==== Players Championships ====
Season	1	2	3	4	5	6	7	8	9	10	11	12	13	14	15	16	17	18	19	20	21	22	23	24	25	26	27	28	29	30	31	32	33	34
2025	WIG; 1R	WIG; 1R	ROS; 1R	ROS; 1R	LEI; 2R	LEI; 1R	HIL; 1R	HIL; 1R	LEI; 1R	LEI; 1R	LEI; 1R	LEI; 3R	ROS; 3R	ROS; F	HIL; 3R	HIL; 4R	LEI; 2R	LEI; 1R	LEI; 3R	LEI; 1R	LEI; 1R	HIL; 3R	HIL; 1R	MIL; 2R	MIL; 2R	HIL; 1R	HIL; 4R	LEI; 1R	LEI; 1R	LEI; 1R	WIG; 1R	WIG; 1R	WIG; 1R	WIG; 1R
2026	HIL; 1R	HIL; 3R	WIG; 1R	WIG; 1R	LEI; 1R	LEI; 1R	LEI; 1R	LEI; 1R	WIG; 3R	WIG; 2R	MIL; 1R	MIL; 1R	HIL; 1R	HIL; 1R	LEI; 1R	LEI; 1R	LEI; 1R	LEI; 1R	MIL; 1R	MIL; 2R	WIG; 1R	WIG; 1R	LEI; 2R	LEI; 1R	HIL; 1R	HIL; 1R	LEI; 1R	LEI; 1R	ROS; 1R	ROS; 1R	ROS; 4R	ROS; 1R	LEI; 1R	LEI; 1R

Performance Table Legend
W	Won the tournament	F	Finalist	SF	Semifinalist	QF	Quarterfinalist	#R; RR; Prel.	Lost in # round Round-robin; Preliminary round	DQ	Disqualified
DNQ	Did not qualify	DNP	Did not participate	WD	Withdrew	NH	Tournament not held	#R; RR; Prel.	Lost in # round Round-robin; Preliminary round	NYF	Not yet founded

== Titles ==
- PDC secondary tours
  - PDC Development Tour
    - 2025: 10, 21
