= Arno Merk =

German darts player (born 1992)

Personal information
- Born: 30 September 1992 (age 34) Peine, Lower Saxony, Germany

Sport
- Sport: Darts
- Playing since: 2008
- Darts: 22.5g Bull's Germany
- Laterality: Right-handed

Organisation (see split in darts)
- PDC: 2024–present (Tour Card: 2026–present)
- WDF: 2010–2025
- Current world ranking: (PDC) 119 (29 October 2026)

WDF major events – best performances
- World Championship: Last 32: 2011
- World Masters: Last 256: 2010

PDC premier events – best performances
- World Championship: Last 32: 2026

Arno Merk (born 30 September 1992) is a German professional darts player who competes in Professional Darts Corporation (PDC) and World Darts Federation (WDF) events.

== Career ==
Merk was one of the most successful young players from Germany. He became the German Youth Champion in 2010 at the age of 17. That year, his consistently strong performances at DDV tournaments also propelled him to the number one spot in the German youth rankings. In the 2010 World Masters he lost to Martin Heneghan in the first round match. At the end of season, he qualified for the 2011 BDO World Darts Championship. In the first round, he lost to Garry Thompson.

He made his return to competition in the German Super League in 2023, where he was eliminated in the second round by Pascal Rupprecht. At the beginning of 2024, Merk played in the PDC Qualifying School, but he was unable to secure a Tour Card and subsequently competed on the PDC Challenge Tour. In April 2024, he qualified for the 2024 European Darts Grand Prix, making his PDC European Tour debut. Merk lost in the first round to Luke Littler. He then participated in the 2024 World Masters, but he lost in group-stage. At the German Super League in 2024, Merk was again eliminated in the second round.

In March 2025, Merk reached his first PDC Challenge Tour event quarter-final. As a call-up, he reached the third round of Players Championship 22. He also played in the PDC Europe Next-Gen season, winning the last two events and qualifying for the German Super League once again. There, Merk defeated Daniel Klose in the final and qualified for the 2026 PDC World Darts Championship. Having defeated Kim Huybrechts and Peter Wright in the first and second round respectively, he lost 4–1 to Michael van Gerwen in the third round.

== World Championship results ==
=== BDO ===
- 2011: First round (lost to Garry Thompson 1–3) (sets)

=== PDC ===
- 2026: Third round (lost to Michael van Gerwen 1–4)

== Performance timeline ==
=== BDO ===
Tournament	2010	2011
BDO Ranked televised events
World Championship	DNQ	1R
World Masters	1R	DNP

=== WDF ===
Tournament	2024
WDF Major/platinum events
World Masters	RR

=== PDC ===
Tournament	2026
PDC Ranked televised events
World Championship	3R

==== PDC Players Championships ====
Season	1	2	3	4	5	6	7	8	9	10	11	12	13	14	15	16	17	18	19	20	21	22	23	24	25	26	27	28	29	30	31	32	33	34
2025	Did not participate																					HIL; 3R	HIL; 2R	Did not participate										
2026	HIL; 1R	HIL; 1R	WIG; 1R	WIG; 3R	LEI; 1R	LEI; 2R	LEI; 3R	LEI; 2R	WIG; 2R	WIG; 2R	MIL; 2R	MIL; 1R	HIL; 2R	HIL; 2R	LEI; 1R	LEI; 2R	LEI; 1R	LEI; 1R	MIL; 1R	MIL; 1R	WIG; 2R	WIG; 1R	LEI; 2R	LEI; 1R	HIL; 1R	HIL; 1R	LEI; 2R	LEI; 2R	ROS; 1R	ROS; 2R	ROS; 1R	ROS; 1R	LEI; 1R	LEI; 1R

==== PDC Challenge Tour ====
Season	1	2	3	4	5	6	7	8	9	10	11	12	13	14	15	16	17	18	19	20	21	22	23	24
2025	L64	L256	L32	L64	L128	L64	QF	L256	L64	L64	L16	L256	L256	L256	L64	Did not participate								

Performance Table Legend
W	Won the tournament	F	Finalist	SF	Semifinalist	QF	Quarterfinalist	#R; RR; L#	Lost in # round Round-robin; Last # stage	DQ	Disqualified
DNQ	Did not qualify	DNP	Did not participate	WD	Withdrew	NH	Tournament not held	#R; RR; L#	Lost in # round Round-robin; Last # stage	NYF	Not yet founded
