= 2017 German Darts Masters (European Tour) =

Tournament information
- Dates: 15–17 April 2017
- Venue: Sparkassen-Arena
- Location: Jena, Germany
- Organisation(s): Professional Darts Corporation (PDC)
- Format: Legs; First to 6 legs
- Prize fund: £135,000
- Winner's share: £25,000
- High checkout: 164 Michael van Gerwen

Champion(s)
- Michael van Gerwen (NED)

The 2017 German Darts Masters was the second of twelve PDC European Tour events on the 2017 PDC Pro Tour. The tournament took place at Sparkassen-Arena, Jena, Germany, between 15–17 April 2017. It featured a field of 48 players and £135,000 in prize money, with £25,000 going to the winner.

Michael van Gerwen was the defending champion, having beaten Peter Wright 6–4 in the final of the previous edition, and he defended his title by defeating Jelle Klaasen 6–2 in the final.

== Prize money ==
This is how the prize money is divided:

Stage (num. of players)		Prize money
Winner	(1)	£25,000
Runner-up	(1)	£10,000
Semi-finalists	(2)	£6,000
Quarter-finalists	(4)	£4,000
Third round losers	(8)	£3,000
Second round losers	(16)	£2,000
First round losers	(16)	£1,000
Total	£135,000	

== Qualification and format ==
The top 16 players from the PDC ProTour Order of Merit on 23 March automatically qualified for the event and were seeded in the second round.

The remaining 32 places went to players from five qualifying events - 18 from the UK Qualifier (held in Milton Keynes on 31 March), eight from the West/South European Qualifier (held on 23 March), four from the Host Nation Qualifier (held on 14 April), one from the Nordic & Baltic Qualifier (held on 17 February) and one from the East European Qualifier (held on 25 February).

The following players took part in the tournament:

Top 16
1. (Netherlands) Michael van Gerwen (champion)
2. (Scotland) Peter Wright (quarter-finals)
3. (Austria) Mensur Suljović (third round)
4. (Australia) Simon Whitlock (semi-finals)
5. (Netherlands) Benito van de Pas (second round)
6. (England) Ian White (second round)
7. (England) James Wade (semi-finals)
8. (England) Alan Norris (second round)
9. (Belgium) Kim Huybrechts (third round)
10. (Wales) Gerwyn Price (third round)
11. (Netherlands) Jelle Klaasen (runner-up)
12. (England) Michael Smith (quarter-finals)
13. (England) Joe Cullen (second round)
14. (England) Steve West (second round)
15. (England) Stephen Bunting (third round)
16. (Spain) Cristo Reyes (third round)

UK Qualifier
- (England) Ronnie Baxter (first round)
- (Northern Ireland) Daryl Gurney (second round)
- (England) Brian Woods (first round)
- (Wales) Robert Owen (first round)
- (Australia) Kyle Anderson (quarter-finals)
- (England) Mervyn King (second round)
- (England) Justin Pipe (first round)
- (England) Robbie Green (first round)
- (Scotland) Robert Thornton (second round)
- (England) Ted Evetts (second round)
- (England) Andrew Gilding (first round)
- (Netherlands) Raymond van Barneveld (quarter-finals)
- (Wales) Jamie Lewis (second round)
- (England) Ricky Evans (first round)
- (Wales) Mark Webster (second round)
- (England) Adrian Lewis (first round)
- (Wales) Jonny Clayton (second round)
- (England) Joe Murnan (first round)

West/South European Qualifier
- (Netherlands) Dirk van Duijvenbode (first round)
- (Netherlands) Sven Groen (first round)
- (Netherlands) Jeffrey de Graaf (third round)
- (Belgium) Ronny Huybrechts (first round)
- (Austria) Zoran Lerchbacher (first round)
- (Netherlands) Michael Plooy (first round)
- (Austria) Rowby-John Rodriguez (third round)
- (Greece) John Michael (second round)

Host Nation Qualifier
- (Germany) Steffen Siepmann (third round)
- (Germany) Robert Marijanović (first round)
- (Germany) Max Hopp (second round)
- (Germany) Dragutin Horvat (second round)

Nordic & Baltic Qualifier
- (Sweden) Daniel Larsson (second round)

East European Qualifier
- (Poland) Krzysztof Ratajski (first round)

== Draw ==
First round (best of 11 legs); 15 April
(Greece) John Michael 89.56	6
(Germany) Robert Marijanović 82.71	2
(England) Mervyn King 94.03	6
(Netherlands) Sven Groen 90.04	3
(Netherlands) Raymond van Barneveld 96.86	6
(Netherlands) Michael Plooy 81.99	4
(England) Justin Pipe 80.32	0
(Sweden) Daniel Larsson 91.09	6
(Austria) Rowby-John Rodriguez 91.26	6
(Poland) Krzysztof Ratajski 78.97	1
(England) Brian Woods 76.75	3
(Germany) Dragutin Horvat 77.51	6
(Belgium) Ronny Huybrechts 91.75	5
(Wales) Jonny Clayton 88.42	6
(England) Andrew Gilding 66.19	4
(Germany) Steffen Siepmann 75.58	6
(Wales) Mark Webster 87.49	6
(England) Robbie Green 86.20	4
(England) Joe Murnan 89.59	4
(England) Ted Evetts 98.81	6
(Scotland) Robert Thornton 89.55	6
(Netherlands) Dirk van Duijvenbode 81.53	1
(Germany) Max Hopp 97.27	6
(Wales) Robert Owen 87.28	3
(England) Ricky Evans 91.07	5
(Netherlands) Jeffrey de Graaf 93.18	6
(England) Adrian Lewis 90.94	5
(Northern Ireland) Daryl Gurney 98.08	6
(Wales) Jamie Lewis 84.56	6
(Austria) Zoran Lerchbacher 82.75	3
(Australia) Kyle Anderson 85.93	6
(England) Ronnie Baxter 89.33	5

Second round (best of 11 legs); 16 April
1	(Netherlands) Michael van Gerwen 110.12	6
(Greece) John Michael 91.30	1
16	(Spain) Cristo Reyes 92.11	6
(England) Mervyn King 88.49	5
8	(England) Alan Norris 87.92	4
(Netherlands) Raymond van Barneveld 89.08	6
9	(Belgium) Kim Huybrechts 92.44	6
(Sweden) Daniel Larsson 90.10	2
5	(Netherlands) Benito van de Pas 96.69	4
(Austria) Rowby-John Rodriguez 94.18	6
12	(England) Michael Smith 98.51	6
(Germany) Dragutin Horvat 83.20	1
4	(Australia) Simon Whitlock 96.55	6
(Wales) Jonny Clayton 98.09	4
13	(England) Joe Cullen 85.46	5
(Germany) Steffen Siepmann 80.92	6
2	(Scotland) Peter Wright 98.65	6
(Wales) Mark Webster 96.29	3
15	(England) Stephen Bunting 90.78	6
(England) Ted Evetts 88.71	4
7	(England) James Wade 91.35	6
(Scotland) Robert Thornton 91.49	3
10	(Wales) Gerwyn Price 93.24	6
(Germany) Max Hopp 84.99	1
6	(England) Ian White 87.93	5
(Netherlands) Jeffrey de Graaf 91.93	6
11	(Netherlands) Jelle Klaasen 87.24	6
(Northern Ireland) Daryl Gurney 90.59	4
3	(Austria) Mensur Suljović 90.77	6
(Wales) Jamie Lewis 89.48	5
14	(England) Steve West 95.32	4
(Australia) Kyle Anderson 96.72	6

Third round (best of 11 legs); 17 April
1	(Netherlands) van Gerwen 110.78	6
16	(Spain) Reyes 92.56	3
(Netherlands) van Barneveld 102.16	6
9	(Belgium) K. Huybrechts 96.43	4
(Austria) Rodriguez 77.66	1
12	(England) Smith 92.58	6
4	(Australia) Whitlock 93.27	6
(Germany) Siepmann 83.73	1
2	(Scotland) Wright 95.39	6
15	(England) Bunting 100.74	1
7	(England) Wade 87.41	6
10	(Wales) Price 89.52	2
(Netherlands) de Graaf 89.38	5
11	(Netherlands) Klaasen 92.28	6
3	(Austria) Suljović 99.05	2
(Australia) Anderson 98.53	6

Quarter-finals (best of 11 legs); 17 April
1	(Netherlands) van Gerwen 105.23	6
(Netherlands) van Barneveld 99.50	3
12	(England) Smith 92.16	4
4	(Australia) Whitlock 93.30	6
2	(Scotland) Wright 93.72	3
7	(England) Wade 94.33	6
11	(Netherlands) Klaasen 92.63	6
(Australia) Anderson 94.22	4

Semi-finals (best of 11 legs); 17 April
1	(Netherlands) van Gerwen 100.58	6
4	(Australia) Whitlock 92.30	2
7	(England) Wade 84.40	3
11	(Netherlands) Klaasen 93.99	6

Final (best of 11 legs); 17 April
1	(Netherlands) van Gerwen 107.33	6
11	(Netherlands) Klaasen 98.29	2
