= 2025 PDC Development Tour =

Darts tournament series

The 2025 PDC Development Tour (known for sponsorship reasons as the Winmau Development Tour) was a series of non-televised darts tournaments organised by the Professional Darts Corporation (PDC). A secondary tour to the PDC Pro Tour, it consisted of 24 tournaments, held over four weekends of five events and one weekend of four events.

The Development Tour is the PDC's youth system open to all players outside of the top 64 on the PDC Order of Merit that are aged 16–24. According to PDC Order of Merit Rule 6.2, from 2025, players ranked in the top 64 of the PDC Order of Merit were no longer eligible to play in Development Tour events, a change from the previous rule that only prohibited top 32 players from competing.

Under PDC Order of Merit Rule 6.9, the 2025 Development Tour rewards were as follows:

- The top two players on the 2025 Development Tour Order of Merit, who had not obtained a PDC Tour Card for the 2026 season via another method, won a two-year Tour Card for the 2026 and 2027 seasons.
- The top three players on the Development Tour Order of Merit, who had not qualified via another method, qualified for places at the 2026 PDC World Championship.
- The highest ranked player on the Development Tour Order of Merit, Cam Crabtree, received a spot at the 2025 Grand Slam of Darts.
- The players in the top 16 of the Development Tour Order of Merit, who had not obtained a PDC Tour Card before 2026 Qualifying School (Q–School), were granted free entry to the final stage of Q–School.
- The eight highest ranked players from the Development Tour Order of Merit, who did not earn a Tour Card for the 2026 season, qualified for the first round of the 2026 UK Open.

== Prize money ==
The prize money for the Development Tour events remained the same as in 2023 and 2024. £360,000 was the total prize fund, with £15,000 being the prize fund for each of the 24 events. The winner of each event received £2,500. The prize fund breakdown was:

| Stage (no. of players) | | Prize money (Total: £15,000) |
|---|---|---|
| Winner | (1) | £2,500 |
| Runner-up | (1) | £1,000 |
| Semi-finalists | (2) | £750 |
| Quarter-finalists | (4) | £500 |
| Last 16 | (8) | £300 |
| Last 32 | (16) | £200 |
| Last 64 | (32) | £75 |

== February ==
=== Development Tour 1 ===
Development Tour 1 was contested on Friday 21 February at the Arena MK in Milton Keynes. The tournament was won by Sebastian Białecki, who defeated Owen Bates 5–2 in the final.

Quarter-finals (best of 9 legs)
Jamai van den Herik 86.26 | 3
Owen Bates 92.76 | 5
Aidan O'Hara 78.95 | 5
Bradly Roes 80.32 | 2
Jannes Bremermann 70.15 | 0
Sebastian Białecki 87.38 | 5
James Beeton 89.87 | 5
Cam Crabtree 91.51 | 4

Semi-finals (best of 9 legs)
Owen Bates 86.82 | 5
Aidan O'Hara 80.41 | 1
Sebastian Białecki 89.94 | 5
James Beeton 78.16 | 1

Final (best of 9 legs)
Owen Bates 92.89 | 2
Sebastian Białecki 89.34 | 5

=== Development Tour 2 ===
Development Tour 2 was contested on Friday 21 February at the Arena MK in Milton Keynes. The tournament was won by Beau Greaves, who defeated Levy Frauenfelder 5–3 in the final.

Quarter-finals (best of 9 legs)
Beau Greaves 96.35 | 5
Adam Gawlas 68.25 | 0
Charlie Manby 84.95 | 3
Daniel Perry 84.56 | 5
Danny Jansen 83.16 | 3
Levy Frauenfelder 88.21 | 5
Charlie Large 78.81 | 2
Sebastian Białecki 81.71 | 5

Semi-finals (best of 9 legs)
Beau Greaves 94.72 | 5
Daniel Perry 99.76 | 1
Levy Frauenfelder 79.54 | 5
Sebastian Białecki 78.61 | 3

Final (best of 9 legs)
Beau Greaves 91.54 | 5
Levy Frauenfelder 88.77 | 3

=== Development Tour 3 ===
Development Tour 3 was contested on Saturday 22 February at the Arena MK in Milton Keynes. The tournament was won by Owen Bates, who defeated Charlie Manby 5–2 in the final.

Quarter-finals (best of 9 legs)
Tavis Dudeney 88.79 | 4
Owen Bates 95.70 | 5
Jarno Bottenberg 77.00 | 1
Cam Crabtree 87.26 | 5
Nathan Potter 86.64 | 5
Lleyton Molyneux 82.35 | 2
Charlie Manby 85.43 | 5
Dylan Quinn 77.20 | 1

Semi-finals (best of 9 legs)
Owen Bates 94.87 | 5
Cam Crabtree 90.79 | 3
Nathan Potter 88.86 | 1
Charlie Manby 100.78 | 5

Final (best of 9 legs)
Owen Bates 85.59 | 5
Charlie Manby 90.00 | 2

=== Development Tour 4 ===
Development Tour 4 was contested on Saturday 22 February at the Arena MK in Milton Keynes. The tournament was won by Beau Greaves, who defeated James Beeton 5–2 in the final.

Notably, Charlie Manby recorded a three-dart average of 130.70 in his win against Patrik Williams, the highest recorded match average in PDC history.

Quarter-finals (best of 9 legs)
Beau Greaves 90.79 | 5
Liam Maendl-Lawrance 84.33 | 2
Danny Jansen 89.07 | 5
Cam Crabtree 88.35 | 3
Moreno Blom 82.02 | 5
Jannis Barkhausen 76.71 | 4
Daniel Perry 94.38 | 1
James Beeton 98.01 | 5

Semi-finals (best of 9 legs)
Beau Greaves 100.76 | 5
Danny Jansen 89.84 | 2
Moreno Blom 71.42 | 0
James Beeton 96.35 | 5

Final (best of 9 legs)
Beau Greaves 97.68 | 5
James Beeton 96.58 | 2

=== Development Tour 5 ===
Development Tour 5 was contested on Sunday 23 February at the Arena MK in Milton Keynes. The tournament was won by Bradly Roes, who defeated Oliver Pearce-Burgess 5–2 in the final.

Quarter-finals (best of 9 legs)
Oliver Pearce-Burgess 79.45 | 5
Lennert Faes 76.73 | 3
Jannis Barkhausen 79.47 | 1
Jamai van den Herik 93.31 | 5
Henry Coates 88.53 | 2
Charlie Manby 93.66 | 5
Danny Jansen 79.45 | 1
Bradly Roes 88.86 | 5

Semi-finals (best of 9 legs)
Oliver Pearce-Burgess 78.78 | 5
Jamai van den Herik 80.41 | 1
Charlie Manby 82.02 | 2
Bradly Roes 85.49 | 5

Final (best of 9 legs)
Oliver Pearce-Burgess 76.01 | 2
Bradly Roes 83.11 | 5

== March ==
=== Development Tour 6 ===
Development Tour 6 was contested on Friday 28 March at the Leicester Arena. Beau Greaves won her third Development Tour title of the year by defeating Henry Coates 5–3 in the final.

Quarter-finals (best of 9 legs)
Bram van Dijk 73.55 | 1
Cam Crabtree 96.32 | 5
Henry Coates 85.83 | 5
Bradly Roes 78.82 | 2
Beau Greaves 87.24 | 5
Damian Vetjens 76.24 | 1
Charlie Manby 97.44 | 5
Jurjen van der Velde 98.19 | 3

Semi-finals (best of 9 legs)
Cam Crabtree 89.54 | 4
Henry Coates 87.19 | 5
Beau Greaves 94.80 | 5
Charlie Manby 85.13 | 1

Final (best of 9 legs)
Henry Coates 89.06 | 3
Beau Greaves 100.68 | 5

=== Development Tour 7 ===
Development Tour 7 was contested on Friday 28 March at the Leicester Arena. The tournament was won by Ryan Branley who defeated Dominik Grüllich 5–4 in the final.

Quarter-finals (best of 9 legs)
Kyle Manton 86.50 | 4
Jenson Walker 88.50 | 5
Viktor Tingström 89.06 | 1
Ryan Branley 91.65 | 5
Dylan Quinn 78.70 | 2
Adam Gawlas 85.68 | 5
Dominik Grüllich 95.54 | 5
James Buckby 86.22 | 4

Semi-finals (best of 9 legs)
Jenson Walker 77.17 | 3
Ryan Branley 86.98 | 5
Adam Gawlas 78.28 | 0
Dominik Grüllich 91.65 | 5

Final (best of 9 legs)
Ryan Branley 86.26 | 5
Dominik Grüllich 94.47 | 4

=== Development Tour 8 ===
Development Tour 8 was contested on Saturday 29 March at the Leicester Arena. Patrik Williams won his first Development Tour title by defeating Nathan Potter 5–2 in the final.

Quarter-finals (best of 9 legs)
Nathan Potter 95.20 | 5
Dominik Grüllich 93.52 | 3
Owen Bates 76.91 | 1
David Schlichting 84.06 | 5
Levy Frauenfelder 84.29 | 4
Damian Vetjens 85.33 | 5
Patrik Williams 88.90 | 5
Ryan Branley 88.37 | 3

Semi-finals (best of 9 legs)
Nathan Potter 93.22 | 5
David Schlichting 84.52 | 2
Damian Vetjens 76.26 | 0
Patrik Williams 88.41 | 5

Final (best of 9 legs)
Nathan Potter 83.06 | 2
Patrik Williams 85.88 | 5

=== Development Tour 9 ===
Development Tour 9 was contested on Saturday 29 March at the Leicester Arena. Owen Bates won his second Development Tour title by defeating Leon Weber 5–2 in the final.

Quarter-finals (best of 9 legs)
Keenan Thomas 87.96 | 1
Owen Bates 92.85 | 5
Jannis Barkhausen 91.22 | 2
Beau Greaves 101.85 | 5
Charlie Manby 92.36 | 2
Sebastian Białecki 96.62 | 5
Leon Weber 91.61 | 5
Jurjen van der Velde 92.65 | 4

Semi-finals (best of 9 legs)
Owen Bates 97.58 | 5
Beau Greaves 84.83 | 1
Sebastian Białecki 95.50 | 3
Leon Weber 92.90 | 5

Final (best of 9 legs)
Owen Bates 99.43 | 5
Leon Weber 91.00 | 2

=== Development Tour 10 ===
Development Tour 10 was contested on Sunday 30 March at the Leicester Arena. The tournament was won by Dominik Grüllich, who defeated Leon Weber 5–0 in the final.

Quarter-finals (best of 9 legs)
Ryan Branley 94.29 | 5
Keanu van Velzen 80.94 | 1
Dylan Dowling 80.80 | 2
Dominik Grüllich 91.51 | 5
James Buckby 80.10 | 3
Jurjen van der Velde 86.79 | 5
Leon Weber 91.70 | 5
Beau Greaves 90.49 | 2

Semi-finals (best of 9 legs)
Ryan Branley 89.70 | 2
Dominik Grüllich 94.19 | 5
Jurjen van der Velde 86.90 | 1
Leon Weber 90.61 | 5

Final (best of 9 legs)
Dominik Grüllich 98.88 | 5
Leon Weber 91.30 | 0

== May ==
=== Development Tour 11 ===
Development Tour 11 was contested on Friday 9 May at Halle 39 in Hildesheim. The tournament was won by Cam Crabtree, who defeated Adam Gawlas 5–2 in the final.

Quarter-finals (best of 9 legs)
Cam Crabtree 87.74 | 5
Nathan Potter 83.66 | 1
Angelo Balsamo 83.54 | 5
Dylan Dowling 84.64 | 3
Liam Maendl-Lawrance 87.08 | 2
Jannis Barkhausen 83.92 | 5
Florian Preis 82.22 | 3
Adam Gawlas 88.89 | 5

Semi-finals (best of 9 legs)
Cam Crabtree 91.03 | 5
Angelo Balsamo 89.80 | 3
Jannis Barkhausen 90.22 | 2
Adam Gawlas 90.87 | 5

Final (best of 9 legs)
Cam Crabtree 92.52 | 5
Adam Gawlas 90.14 | 2

=== Development Tour 12 ===
Development Tour 12 was contested on Friday 9 May at Halle 39 in Hildesheim. The tournament was won by Jannis Barkhausen, who defeated Owen Bates 5–2 in the final.

Quarter-finals (best of 9 legs)
Beau Greaves 92.80 | 5
Nathan Potter 87.04 | 4
Jannis Barkhausen 93.12 | 5
Finn Chudziak 86.41 | 3
Owen Bates 82.41 | 5
Bradley van der Velden 78.55 | 4
Viktor Tingström 84.99 | 5
Jenson Walker 85.11 | 4

Semi-finals (best of 9 legs)
Beau Greaves 80.70 | 1
Jannis Barkhausen 88.29 | 5
Owen Bates 89.79 | 5
Viktor Tingström 90.27 | 2

Final (best of 9 legs)
Jannis Barkhausen 82.35 | 5
Owen Bates 81.98 | 2

=== Development Tour 13 ===
Development Tour 13 was contested on Saturday 10 May at Halle 39 in Hildesheim. The tournament was won by Cam Crabtree, who defeated Patrik Williams 5–1 in the final.

Quarter-finals (best of 9 legs)
Cam Crabtree 96.47 | 5
Beau Greaves 98.81 | 4
Tavis Dudeney 99.98 | 5
James Beeton 93.14 | 1
James Buckby 88.67 | 3
Henry Coates 100.27 | 5
Adam Gawlas 92.18 | 2
Patrik Williams 102.33 | 5

Semi-finals (best of 9 legs)
Cam Crabtree 92.50 | 5
Tavis Dudeney 85.83 | 4
Henry Coates 92.47 | 2
Patrik Williams 93.29 | 5

Final (best of 9 legs)
Cam Crabtree 89.70 | 5
Patrik Williams 77.42 | 1

=== Development Tour 14 ===
Development Tour 14 was contested on Saturday 10 May at Halle 39 in Hildesheim. The tournament was won by Jurjen van der Velde, who defeated Henry Coates 5–4 in the final.

Quarter-finals (best of 9 legs)
Jeffrey Keen 84.32 | 3
Shane de Jong 90.02 | 5
Damian Vetjens 89.74 | 3
Henry Coates 91.76 | 5
Jurjen van der Velde 95.53 | 5
Florian Preis 80.75 | 2
Thomas Banks 85.79 | 2
Ronan McDonagh 89.26 | 5

Semi-finals (best of 9 legs)
Shane de Jong 70.71 | 0
Henry Coates 79.95 | 5
Jurjen van der Velde 92.95 | 5
Ronan McDonagh 88.62 | 2

Final (best of 9 legs)
Henry Coates 86.60 | 4
Jurjen van der Velde 91.85 | 5

=== Development Tour 15 ===
Development Tour 15 was contested on Sunday 11 May at Halle 39 in Hildesheim. The tournament was won by Cam Crabtree, who defeated Jenson Walker 5–0 in the final.

Quarter-finals (best of 9 legs)
Yorick Hofkens 82.61 | 5
Jack Male 77.18 | 3
Sebastian Białecki 87.32 | 1
Jenson Walker 89.48 | 5
Beau Greaves 94.76 | 1
Cam Crabtree 99.71 | 5
Charlie Manby 93.54 | 2
Moreno Blom 93.73 | 5

Semi-finals (best of 9 legs)
Yorick Hofkens 81.00 | 1
Jenson Walker 95.68 | 5
Cam Crabtree 90.00 | 5
Moreno Blom 87.77 | 2

Final (best of 9 legs)
Jenson Walker 77.33 | 0
Cam Crabtree 90.54 | 5

== September ==
=== Development Tour 16 ===
Development Tour 16 was contested on Friday 5 September at the Robin Park Tennis Centre in Wigan. Charlie Manby won his first Development Tour title by defeating Owen Bates 5–4 in the final.

Quarter-finals (best of 9 legs)
Patrik Williams 83.71 | 5
Levy Frauenfelder 79.17 | 4
Owen Bates 90.87 | 5
Nathan Potter 86.83 | 2
Jamai van den Herik 97.25 | 4
Charlie Manby 96.91 | 5
Jenson Walker 87.12 | 3
Beau Greaves 92.17 | 5

Semi-finals (best of 9 legs)
Patrik Williams 88.81 | 3
Owen Bates 90.61 | 5
Charlie Manby 90.92 | 5
Beau Greaves 86.83 | 3

Final (best of 9 legs)
Owen Bates 91.39 | 4
Charlie Manby 93.02 | 5

=== Development Tour 17 ===
Development Tour 17 was contested on Friday 5 September at the Robin Park Tennis Centre in Wigan. The tournament was won by Jamai van den Herik, who defeated Cam Crabtree 5–1 in the final.

Quarter-finals (best of 9 legs)
Jack Gillett 75.74 | 5
Sebastian Białecki 81.41 | 3
Jamai van den Herik 89.10 | 5
Liam Maendl-Lawrance 91.82 | 4
Jack Drayton 91.72 | 3
Nathan Potter 86.78 | 5
Cam Crabtree 81.19 | 5
Daniel Shala 75.94 | 3

Semi-finals (best of 9 legs)
Jack Gillett 77.02 | 1
Jamai van den Herik 93.06 | 5
Nathan Potter 84.55 | 3
Cam Crabtree 90.02 | 5

Final (best of 9 legs)
Jamai van den Herik 97.76 | 5
Cam Crabtree 87.17 | 1

=== Development Tour 18 ===
Development Tour 18 was contested on Saturday 6 September at the Robin Park Tennis Centre in Wigan. Oliver Pearce-Burgess hit a nine-dart finish in his defeat against Ben Townley. The tournament was won by Tyler Thorpe, who defeated Viktor Tingström 5–3 in the final.

Quarter-finals (best of 9 legs)
Jamie McKinnon 79.31 | 0
James Beeton 79.95 | 5
Charlie Manby 82.77 | 3
Tyler Thorpe 83.67 | 5
Damian Vetjens 77.62 | 0
Viktor Tingström 90.54 | 5
Jurjen van der Velde 85.04 | 4
Ryan Branley 86.59 | 5

Semi-finals (best of 9 legs)
James Beeton 85.46 | 4
Tyler Thorpe 89.41 | 5
Viktor Tingström 89.77 | 5
Ryan Branley 77.43 | 2

Final (best of 9 legs)
Tyler Thorpe 98.45 | 5
Viktor Tingström 89.55 | 3

=== Development Tour 19 ===
Development Tour 19 was contested on Saturday 6 September at the Robin Park Tennis Centre in Wigan. The tournament was won by Cam Crabtree, who defeated Sebastian Białecki 5–3 in the final.

Quarter-finals (best of 9 legs)
Jamai van den Herik 95.80 | 1
Sebastian Białecki 91.53 | 5
Keelan Kay 71.78 | 1
Beau Greaves 93.06 | 5
Keaton Williams 74.51 | 1
Cam Crabtree 92.66 | 5
Ryan Branley 95.44 | 5
Keenan Thomas 81.58 | 2

Semi-finals (best of 9 legs)
Sebastian Białecki 89.26 | 5
Beau Greaves 80.75 | 1
Cam Crabtree 90.71 | 5
Ryan Branley 93.23 | 3

Final (best of 9 legs)
Sebastian Białecki 87.90 | 3
Cam Crabtree 86.90 | 5

=== Development Tour 20 ===
Development Tour 20 was contested on Sunday 7 September at the Robin Park Tennis Centre in Wigan. Jurjen van der Velde won his second Development Tour title of the year by defeating Henry Coates 5–2 in the final.

Quarter-finals (best of 9 legs)
Keanu van Velzen 84.40 | 2
Jack Peet 87.55 | 5
Jurjen van der Velde 85.85 | 5
Owen Bates 84.46 | 3
Henry Coates 83.39 | 5
Owen Roelofs 83.82 | 4
Tavis Dudeney 77.79 | 2
Sebastian Białecki 81.79 | 5

Semi-finals (best of 9 legs)
Jack Peet 76.17 | 0
Jurjen van der Velde 98.88 | 5
Henry Coates 93.80 | 5
Sebastian Białecki 91.37 | 4

Final (best of 9 legs)
Jurjen van der Velde 92.21 | 5
Henry Coates 88.14 | 2

== October ==
=== Development Tour 21 ===
Development Tour 21 was contested on Saturday 11 October at the Robin Park Tennis Centre in Wigan. The tournament was won by Dominik Grüllich who defeated Beau Greaves 5–4 in the final.

Quarter-finals (best of 9 legs)
Cole Davey 76.22 | 2
Beau Greaves 90.29 | 5
Leon Weber 77.03 | 1
Owen Bates 91.86 | 5
Ralfs Laumanis 83.94 | 5
Levy Frauenfelder 87.08 | 4
Charlie Manby 91.99 | 1
Dominik Grüllich 91.74 | 5

Semi-finals (best of 9 legs)
Beau Greaves 95.80 | 5
Owen Bates 90.43 | 4
Ralfs Laumanis 87.78 | 3
Dominik Grüllich 95.06 | 5

Final (best of 9 legs)
Beau Greaves 86.66 | 4
Dominik Grüllich 84.06 | 5

=== Development Tour 22 ===
Development Tour 22 was contested on Saturday 11 October at the Robin Park Tennis Centre in Wigan. Cam Crabtree won his fifth title of the year by defeating Viktor Tingström 5–2 in the final.

Quarter-finals (best of 9 legs)
Cam Crabtree 81.83 | 5
Jamie McKinnon 75.17 | 1
Dylan Dowling 81.02 | 5
Tyler Thorpe 83.29 | 3
Viktor Tingström 88.56 | 5
Nathan Potter 85.32 | 4
Jack Drayton 99.12 | 5
Charlie Manby 94.03 | 2

Semi-finals (best of 9 legs)
Cam Crabtree 88.43 | 5
Dylan Dowling 85.32 | 4
Viktor Tingström 92.36 | 5
Jack Drayton 94.30 | 4

Final (best of 9 legs)
Cam Crabtree 81.28 | 5
Viktor Tingström 77.14 | 2

=== Development Tour 23 ===
Development Tour 23 was contested on Sunday 12 October at the Robin Park Tennis Centre in Wigan.

Quarter-finals (best of 9 legs)
(Belgium) Nunjo Dewaele 91.32 | 3
Jamai van den Herik 96.75 | 5
Pim van Bijnen 77.03 | 4
Rohan Brouwers 79.70 | 5
Jenson Walker 85.60 | 5
Zac Griffiths 59.80 | 1
James Beeton 88.32 | 2
Cayden Smith 91.94 | 5

Semi-finals (best of 9 legs)
Jamai van den Herik 93.00 | 5
Rohan Brouwers 81.87 | 2
Jenson Walker 90.52 | 4
Cayden Smith 88.94 | 5

Final (best of 9 legs)
Jamai van den Herik 78.52 | 5
Cayden Smith 85.00 | 4

=== Development Tour 24 ===
Development Tour 24 was contested on Sunday 12 October at the Robin Park Tennis Centre in Wigan.

Quarter-finals (best of 9 legs)
Charlie Manby 88.81 | 4
Beau Greaves 93.11 | 5
Keanu van Velzen 83.64 | 2
Leon Weber 86.84 | 5
Sebastian Białecki 72.95 | 3
Liam Maendl-Lawrance 78.90 | 5
Jenson Walker 88.50 | 3
Adam Gawlas 89.01 | 5

Semi-finals (best of 9 legs)
Beau Greaves 82.45 | 3
Leon Weber 87.56 | 5
Liam Maendl-Lawrance 89.04 | 3
Adam Gawlas 83.53 | 5

Final (best of 9 legs)
Leon Weber 102.95 | 5
Adam Gawlas 84.22 | 0

== Order of Merit ==
2025 Development Tour ranking
| Rank | Player | Earnings |
|---|---|---|
| 1 | Cam Crabtree (Note: As Development Tour winner Cam Crabtree and third place finisher Owen Bates both qualified via the PDC Pro Tour, extra places were awarded to the fourth and fifth place finisher.) (Note: Crabtree holds a two-year Tour Card awarded in 2025 and is ineligible to receive a 2026–27 Tour Card through the Development Tour. It is instead awarded to the third-placed player.) | £17,775 |
| 2 | Beau Greaves | £15,250 |
| 3 | Owen Bates | £10,900 |
| 4 | Charlie Manby | £10,125 |
| 5 | Jamai van den Herik | £9,600 |
| 6 | Jurjen van der Velde (Note: As PDC World Youth Championship finalists Gian van Veen and Beau Greaves are qualified via the PDC Order of Merit and the Development Tour respectively, an extra place was awarded to the sixth-place finisher.) | £9,225 |
| 7 | Sebastian Białecki | £9,100 |
| 8 | Dominik Grüllich | £8,725 |
| 9 | Ryan Branley | £7,300 |
| 10 | Leon Weber | £6,800 |

Tournament qualifications through PDC Development Tour
2025 Grand Slam of Darts
2026 PDC World Championship and 2026–27 Tour Card
2026–27 PDC Tour Card
2026 PDC World Championship

== Top averages ==
The table lists all players who achieved a three-dart average of at least 110 in a match. In the case one player has multiple records, this is indicated by the number in brackets.

| # | Player | Round | Average | Event | Result |
|---|---|---|---|---|---|
| 1 | Charlie Manby | Last 64 | 130.70 | 4 | Won |
| 2 | Tyler Thorpe | Last 128 | 113.43 | 6 | Won |
| 2 | Liam Maendl-Lawrance | Last 128 | 113.43 | 11 | Won |
| 4 | Charlie Manby (2) | Last 32 | 111.33 | 21 | Won |
| 4 | Beau Greaves | Last 128 | 111.33 | 23 | Won |
| 6 | Ryan Branley | Last 256 | 110.68 | 1 | Won |
