= Jamai van den Herik =

Dutch darts player (born 2003)

Personal information
- Born: 10 April 2003 (age 23) Dordrecht, Netherlands
- Home town: Alblasserdam, Netherlands

Sport
- Sport: Darts
- Playing since: 2016
- Darts: 21g Mission
- Laterality: Right-handed
- Walk-on music: "Warriors" by Imagine Dragons

Organisation (see split in darts)
- PDC: 2019–present
- WDF: 2020–2025
- Current world ranking: (PDC) 215 ▼2 (18 October 2026)

WDF major events – best performances
- Dutch Open: Last 256: 2025

PDC premier events – best performances
- World Championship: Last 128: 2026

Jamai van den Herik (born 10 April 2003) is a Dutch professional darts player who competes in Professional Darts Corporation (PDC) events.

== Career ==
Van den Herik began playing competitively around 2016, and his early achievements included qualifying for the 2019 PDC World Youth Championship as an international qualifier, but he was eliminated in the group-stage, having beat Conor Mayers but lost to Rusty-Jake Rodriguez. In that period, van den Herik played on the PDC Development Tour, where he reached the semi-finals in two events, one in 2020 and another in 2023. He qualified for the 2020 PDC World Youth Championship, but lost in the group stage to Alec Small and Jack Main.

At the beginning of 2024, he participated in the PDC Qualifying School for the first time, but missed out on winning a PDC Tour Card. He participated in the 2024 Dutch Open, but he was eliminated in the second round. At the 2024 PDC World Youth Championship he reached the knockout rounds for the first time, where he was eliminated against Niko Springer. At the 2025 Dutch Open he reached the fifth round, where he lost to Pascal Wirotius. In addition, van den Herik was able to reach the semi-finals in the WDF's Antwerp Open before losing to eventual winner Jimmy van Schie.

In 2025, he competed on both the PDC Challenge Tour and the PDC Development Tour. He won two titles on both PDC secondary tours, hitting a nine-dart finish during his first Challenge Tour tournament win. He also advanced to the quarter-finals of a Players Championship event. At the 2025 PDC World Youth Championship, van den Herik was eliminated in the quarter-finals against Luke Littler. He qualified for the 2026 PDC World Darts Championship as the fifth-placed player in the PDC Development Tour ranking. He lost to Madars Razma 3–1 in the first round.

== World Championship results ==
=== PDC ===
- 2026: First round (lost to Madars Razma 3–1) (sets)

== Performance timeline ==
Van den Herik's performance timeline is as follows:

=== WDF ===
Tournament	2024	2025	2026
WDF Major/platinum events
Dutch Open	2R	5R	3R

=== PDC ===
Tournament	2019	2020	2023	2024	2025	2026
PDC Ranked televised events
World Championship	Did not qualify					1R
World Masters	Did not qualify					Prel.
UK Open	DNQ					2R
PDC Non-ranked televised events
World Youth Championship	RR	RR	RR	2R	QF	2R
Career statistics
Season-end ranking	–	–	–	–	103	

==== Players Championships ====
Season	1	2	3	4	5	6	7	8	9	10	11	12	13	14	15	16	17	18	19	20	21	22	23	24	25	26	27	28	29	30	31	32	33	34
2025	Did not participate														HIL; 3R	HIL; 2R	LEI; DNP			LEI; 2R	LEI; 4R	HIL; QF	HIL; 2R	MIL; 4R	MIL; 3R	HIL; 2R	HIL; 1R	LEI; 2R	LEI; 2R	LEI; 1R	WIG; 1R	WIG; 1R	WIG; 1R	WIG; 1R

==== Challenge Tour ====
Season	1	2	3	4	5	6	7	8	9	10	11	12	13	14	15	16	17	18	19	20	21	22	23	24
2025	L32	L256	L128	L16	L256	L128	L64	L128	L128	L16	L32	W	L64	L128	L256	L32	L256	SF	W	L64	L128	L64	L64	L64

Performance Table Legend
W	Won the tournament	F	Finalist	SF	Semifinalist	QF	Quarterfinalist	#R; RR; Prel.	Lost in # round Round-robin; Preliminary round	DQ	Disqualified
DNQ	Did not qualify	DNP	Did not participate	WD	Withdrew	NH	Tournament not held	#R; RR; Prel.	Lost in # round Round-robin; Preliminary round	NYF	Not yet founded

== Titles ==
- PDC secondary tours
  - PDC Challenge Tour (2)
    - 2025 (×2): 12, 19
  - PDC Development Tour (3)
    - 2025 (×2): 17, 23
    - 2026: 18
