= Owen Bates =

English darts player (born 2002)

Personal information
- Born: 12 December 2002 (age 23)
- Home town: Exeter, Devon, England

Sport
- Sport: Darts
- Darts: 24g Unicorn
- Laterality: Right-handed
- Walk-on music: "Cocoon" by Catfish and the Bottlemen (Radio Edit)

Organisation (see split in darts)
- PDC: 2021–present (Tour Card: 2024–present)
- Current world ranking: (PDC) 97 ▲3 (29 October 2026)

PDC premier events – best performances
- World Championship: Last 96: 2024
- UK Open: Last 128: 2024, 2025

Other tournament wins
- Years
| PDC Challenge Tour | 2023 |
| PDC Development Tour (×3) | 2025 (×2), 2026 (×1) |

Owen Bates (born 12 December 2002) is an English professional darts player who competes in Professional Darts Corporation (PDC) events. He is a PDC Tour Card holder, having gained a Tour Card through his placement on the 2023 PDC Challenge Tour Order of Merit ranking. He has won three PDC Development Tour titles and one PDC Challenge Tour title. Ahead of his PDC World Championship debut at the 2024 event, he garnered mainstream media attention for his former nickname, "the Master", which he was barred from using.

== Career ==
=== 2021–2023 ===
Bates began playing on the PDC Development Tour in 2021. His results started to improve in the 2022 season as he reached the final of event 15, losing 5–3 to Keane Barry.

After an unsuccessful campaign at 2023 PDC Q-School, Bates competed on the 2023 PDC Challenge Tour. He won his first Challenge Tour title at the 19th event by defeating Wesley Plaisier 5–4 in the final. At the end of the season, he reached back-to-back finals in the last two events, events 23 and 24. A 5–4 win against Mike Warburton in the latter event, in which he came back from 4–1 down and survived multiple missed match darts from Warburton, resulted in Bates finishing second place on the 2023 Challenge Tour Order of Merit ranking ahead of John Henderson. This secured him a PDC Tour Card for the next two years and qualification for the 2024 PDC World Darts Championship.

Bates reached the quarter-finals of the 2023 PDC World Youth Championship, where he lost 6–2 to Wessel Nijman. Outside of PDC darts, he competed in the MODUS Super Series, a weekly 12-player tournament for non-Tour Card holders. He won a weekly title in February 2023, defeating Leonard Gates 4–3 for the £5,000 top prize.

=== 2024–present ===
Bates made his PDC World Championship debut at the 2024 event. Ahead of the tournament, he garnered mainstream media attention for his nickname at the time, "the Master", due to its sexual innuendo and the fact the PDC had barred him from using it going forward. Bates faced Steve Lennon in the first round of the tournament and took a two-set lead, but would ultimately lose 3–2 in sets.

In his first year on the PDC Pro Tour, Bates made his European Tour debut at the 2024 International Darts Open, where he narrowly lost 6–5 to Nathan Aspinall in the first round. He reached the third round of the 2024 European Darts Open following wins over Joe Cullen and Danny Noppert, before being eliminated by Stephen Bunting. He competed on the 2025 Development Tour in addition to the Pro Tour, winning two titles and finishing third on the Order of Merit ranking, ensuring a second PDC World Championship appearance at the 2026 event and another two-year Tour Card.

== World Championship results ==
=== PDC ===
- 2024: First round (lost to Steve Lennon 2–3)
- 2026: First round (lost to Ryan Joyce 0–3)

== Performance timeline ==
PDC

| Tournament | 2022 | 2023 | 2024 | 2025 | 2026 |
|---|---|---|---|---|---|
PDC Ranked televised events
| World Championship | DNQ | | 1R | DNQ | 1R |
| World Masters | Did not qualify | | | Prel. | Prel. |
| UK Open | DNQ | | 2R | 2R | 3R |
PDC Non-ranked televised events
| World Youth Championship | RR | QF | RR | 2R | 4R |
Career statistics
| PDC Season-end ranking | – | 109 | 125 | 84 | |

=== European Tour ===
| Tournament | 2024 | 2025 | 2026 |
|---|---|---|---|
| International Open | 1R | Did not qualify | |
| Dutch Championship | 1R | DNQ | 1R |
| European Open | 3R | Did not qualify | |
| Belgian Open | DNQ | 1R | DNQ |
| Swiss Trophy | DNQ | 1R | DNQ |
| Slovak Open | NH | | 1R |

=== Players Championships ===
| Season | 1 | 2 | 3 | 4 | 5 | 6 | 7 | 8 | 9 | 10 | 11 | 12 | 13 | 14 | 15 | 16 | 17 | 18 | 19 | 20 | 21 | 22 | 23 | 24 | 25 | 26 | 27 | 28 | 29 | 30 | 31 | 32 | 33 | 34 |
|---|---|---|---|---|---|---|---|---|---|---|---|---|---|---|---|---|---|---|---|---|---|---|---|---|---|---|---|---|---|---|---|---|---|---|
| 2023 (Note: Not a Tour card holder) | BAR; DNP | | | BAR; 1R | BAR; 1R | BAR; 1R | HIL; 1R | HIL; 3R | WIG; 1R | WIG; 1R | LEI; 1R | LEI; 2R | HIL; 1R | HIL; 1R | LEI; 4R | LEI; 2R | HIL; 1R | HIL; 3R | BAR; 4R | BAR; 3R | BAR; 1R | BAR; 2R | BAR; 2R | BAR; 1R | BAR; 1R | BAR; 1R | BAR; 1R | BAR; 3R | BAR; 2R | BAR; 3R | | | | |
| 2024 | WIG; 1R | WIG; 1R | LEI; 2R | LEI; 1R | HIL; 1R | HIL; 1R | LEI; 2R | LEI; 1R | HIL; 1R | HIL; 1R | HIL; 1R | HIL; 1R | MIL; 3R | MIL; 1R | MIL; 1R | MIL; 1R | MIL; 2R | MIL; 1R | MIL; 1R | WIG; 1R | WIG; 1R | LEI; 1R | LEI; 1R | WIG; 1R | WIG; 2R | WIG; 1R | WIG; 2R | WIG; 1R | LEI; 1R | LEI; 1R | | | | |
| 2025 | WIG; 2R | WIG; 1R | ROS; 3R | ROS; 3R | LEI; 2R | LEI; 3R | HIL; 1R | HIL; 1R | LEI; 3R | LEI; 1R | LEI; 1R | LEI; 3R | ROS; 1R | ROS; 1R | HIL; 2R | HIL; 1R | LEI; 1R | LEI; 2R | LEI; 3R | LEI; 4R | LEI; 2R | HIL; 3R | HIL; 4R | MIL; 1R | MIL; 1R | HIL; 1R | HIL; 2R | LEI; 1R | LEI; 1R | LEI; 1R | WIG; 1R | WIG; 1R | WIG; 2R | WIG; 3R |
| 2026 | HIL; 2R | HIL; 3R | WIG; 2R | WIG; 1R | LEI; 2R | LEI; 1R | LEI; 1R | LEI; 1R | WIG; 2R | WIG; 3R | MIL; 2R | MIL; 1R | HIL; 1R | HIL; 2R | LEI; 2R | LEI; 1R | LEI; 1R | LEI; 2R | MIL; 1R | MIL; 2R | WIG; 1R | WIG; 1R | LEI; 1R | LEI; 4R | HIL; 1R | HIL; 1R | LEI; 2R | LEI; QF | ROS; 1R | ROS; 2R | ROS; 3R | ROS; 2R | LEI; 2R | LEI; 2R |

Performance Table Legend
| W | Won the tournament | F | Finalist | SF | Semifinalist | QF | Quarterfinalist | #R; RR; Prel. | Lost in # round Round-robin; Preliminary round | DQ | Disqualified |
| DNQ | Did not qualify | DNP | Did not participate | WD | Withdrew | NH | Tournament not held | #R; RR; Prel. | Lost in # round Round-robin; Preliminary round | NYF | Not yet founded |
