= Charlie Manby =

English darts player (born 2005)

Personal information
- Nickname: "Champagne"
- Born: 4 August 2005 (age 21) Huddersfield, England
- Home town: Wakefield, England

Sport
- Sport: Darts
- Darts: Target
- Laterality: Right-handed
- Walk-on music: "Champagne Supernova" by Oasis

Organisation (see split in darts)
- PDC: 2024–present (Tour Card: 2026–present)
- Current world ranking: (PDC) 77 ▲1 (5 November 2026)

PDC premier events – best performances
- World Championship: Last 16: 2026
- UK Open: Last 64: 2026
- Grand Slam: Group Stage: 2026

Other tournament wins
- Years
Youth events
PDC Development Tour	2025 DT16

Charlie Manby (born 4 August 2005) is an English darts player who competes in Professional Darts Corporation (PDC) events. He gained attention in February 2025 after recording a three-dart match average of 130.7 at 2025 Development Tour 4, the highest in PDC Development Tour history. He reached the last 16 of the 2026 PDC World Darts Championship in his World Championship debut.

== Career ==
Manby began his career competing in World Darts Federation (WDF) youth events. In 2022, he won multiple titles at the WDF Europe Youth Cup representing England alongside Thomas Banks in the pairs competition. He partnered Banks, Archie Self and Luke Littler in the team competition. They won the Pairs, Team, and Overall categories.

In February 2025, he reached his first final on the PDC Development Tour at event 3 before later that same day recording a 130.70 three-dart average in a 4–0 whitewash over Patrik Williams at event 4, the highest recorded PDC Development Tour average. In September, he won event 16. Manby reached the last 16 at the 2025 PDC World Youth Championship, but lost to reigning world champion Luke Littler 5–6 in a deciding leg; he had missed two match darts.

Manby qualified for the 2026 PDC World Darts Championship via the 2025 Development Tour Order of Merit. He defeated 26th seed Cameron Menzies 3–2 in sets in the first round. He reached the fourth round of the tournament, eventually being defeated 4–1 by Gian van Veen. At 2026 Q-School, Manby earned a PDC Tour Card on the final day of play.

== Personal life ==
Outside of darts, Manby is a bricklayer by trade. He previously played cricket for Clayton West CC.

== World Championship results ==
=== PDC ===
- 2026: Fourth round (lost to Gian van Veen 1–4)

== Performance timeline ==
Charlie Manby's performance timeline is as follows:

Tournament	2025	2026
PDC Ranked televised events
World Championship	DNQ	4R
World Masters	Prel.	Prel.
UK Open	1R	4R
Grand Slam	DNQ	RR
Players Championship Finals	DNQ	

=== PDC European Tour ===
Tournament	2026
International Darts Open	2R
European Darts Open	1R

=== PDC Players Championships ===
Season	1	2	3	4	5	6	7	8	9	10	11	12	13	14	15	16	17	18	19	20	21	22	23	24	25	26	27	28	29	30	31	32	33	34
2025	Did not participate																									HIL; 1R	HIL; 3R	Did not participate					WIG; 2R	WIG; DNP
2026	HIL; 2R	HIL; 3R	WIG; 1R	WIG; 2R	LEI; 2R	LEI; 1R	LEI; QF	LEI; QF	WIG; 1R	WIG; 3R	MIL; 1R	MIL; 2R	HIL; 1R	HIL; 1R	LEI; 1R	LEI; 2R	LEI; 2R	LEI; 4R	MIL; 4R	MIL; 2R	WIG; 1R	WIG; 1R	LEI; QF	LEI; 1R	HIL; 1R	HIL; 3R	LEI; 2R	LEI; 3R	ROS; 1R	ROS; 3R	ROS; W	ROS; 4R	LEI; 3R	LEI; 3R

=== PDC Development Tour ===
Season	1	2	3	4	5	6	7	8	9	10	11	12	13	14	15	16	17	18	19	20	21	22	23	24
2024	MIL; L32	MIL; L16	MIL; L128	MIL; L32	MIL; L16	HIL; L16	HIL; L64	HIL; L128	HIL; L16	HIL; QF	WIG; L16	WIG; L32	WIG; QF	WIG; L32	WIG; L32	MIL; L64	MIL; L256	MIL; L16	MIL; L128	MIL; L16	WIG; L64	WIG; L256	WIG; L64	WIG; L256
2025	MIL; L512	MIL; QF	MIL; F	MIL; L16	MIL; SF	LEI; SF	LEI; L16	LEI; L256	LEI; QF	LEI; L64	HIL; L64	HIL; L32	HIL; L16	HIL; L128	HIL; QF	WIG; W	WIG; L16	WIG; QF	WIG; L64	WIG; L128	WIG; QF	WIG; QF	WIG; L256	WIG; QF
2026	LEI; QF	LEI; L32	LEI; F	LEI; L64	LEI; QF																			

Performance Table Legend
W	Won the tournament	F	Finalist	SF	Semifinalist	QF	Quarterfinalist	#R; RR; L#	Lost in # round Round-robin; Last # stage	DQ	Disqualified
DNQ	Did not qualify	DNP	Did not participate	WD	Withdrew	NH	Tournament not held	#R; RR; L#	Lost in # round Round-robin; Last # stage	NYF	Not yet founded
