= Peter Burgoyne (cricketer) =

English cricketer and darts player (born 1993)

Personal information
- Full name: Peter Ian Burgoyne
- Born: 11 November 1993 (age 33); Nottingham, England
- Batting: Right-handed
- Bowling: Right-arm off break

Domestic team information
- Years: Team
- 2011–2013: Derbyshire (squad no. 32)
- 2012/13: Southern Rocks
- 2015: Sussex
- 2016–2019: Herefordshire
- FC debut: 30 October 2012 Southern Rocks v Mashonaland Eagles
- LA debut: 21 August 2011 Derbyshire v Middlesex

Career statistics
Competition	FC	LA	T20
Matches	12	16	10
Runs scored	538	129	108
Batting average	28.31	16.12	18.00
100s/50s	2/1	0/0	0/0
Top score	104	43	38
Balls bowled	1,473	567	174
Wickets	16	13	6
Bowling average	50.87	39.46	31.50
5 wickets in innings	0	0	0
10 wickets in match	0	0	0
Best bowling	3/27	3/31	2/13
Catches/stumpings	8/–	9/–	1/–
- Source: CricketArchive, 5 September 2013

Peter Burgoyne
Sport
- Sport: Darts

Organisation (see split in darts)
- PDC: 2022–

Other tournament wins
- Years
Latvia Open (pairs)	2017

Peter Ian Burgoyne (born 11 November 1993) is an English cricketer and darts player. He played for Derbyshire County Cricket Club as an all-rounder who bowled right-arm off spin, and batted right-handed. He made his debut for the county in the 2011 Clydesdale Bank 40 against Middlesex in August 2011.

Burgoyne began playing darts within the British Darts Organisation (BDO). winning the 2017 Latvia Open pairs. He began playing the Professional Darts Corporation (PDC) Challenge Tour in 2022, reaching the final of the fourth event.
