= Dragutin Horvat =

German darts player (born 1976)

Personal information
- Nickname: Hercules
- Born: 8 January 1976 (age 50) Kassel, Germany

Sport
- Sport: Darts
- Playing since: 2007
- Darts: 21g Bull's
- Laterality: Right-handed
- Walk-on music: "Freed from Desire" by Gala

Organisation (see split in darts)
- PDC: 2012–present
- Current world ranking: (PDC) 150 ▼1 (18 October 2026)

PDC premier events – best performances
- World Championship: Last 64: 2017

Other tournament wins
- Years
PDC Challenge Tour	2023, 2025
PDC Europe Next Gen	2025

Dragutin Horvat (born 8 January 1976) is a German professional darts player who competes in Professional Darts Corporation (PDC) events. He has won two titles on the PDC's secondary tour, the Challenge Tour. He made his first PDC European Tour quarter-final at the 2016 International Darts Open.

== Career ==
Horvat reached the quarter-finals of the 2016 International Darts Open, defeating Ricky Evans, Gerwyn Price and Ian White before being eliminated by Kim Huybrechts.

Horvat qualified for the 2017 PDC World Darts Championship after defeating Stefan Stoyke 10–6 in the final of the Superleague Germany finals event. He beat Russia's Boris Koltsov in a sudden-death leg in the preliminary round, but was then beaten 3–0 by Simon Whitlock in the first round.

In March 2023, Horvat won Challenge Tour 9, whitewashing Christian Kist 5–0 in the final. In November, he qualified for the 2024 PDC World Darts Championship after beating Pascal Rupprecht 8–3 in the Super League Darts 2023. He lost 0–3 to Mike De Decker in the first round.

In 2025, Horvat won a second Challenge Tour title at Challenge Tour 6, defeating Ted Evetts 5–4 in the final.

== World Championship results ==
=== PDC ===
- 2017: First round (lost to Simon Whitlock 0–3)
- 2024: First round (lost to Mike De Decker 0–3)

== Performance timeline ==
=== PDC ===
Tournament	2017	2024
World Championship	1R	1R
Career statistics
Year-end ranking	140	175

=== European Tour ===
Tournament	2013	2016	2017	2018	2019	2020	2022	2023	2024	2025	2026
European Trophy	1R										1R
German Masters	1R		2R								
International Open		QF	1R				1R				
European Grand Prix		1R			1R		1R				
European Open			1R							1R	
German Open				1R			2R				
Dutch Masters				2R							
Danish Open				1R							
European Matchplay				1R							
German Grand Prix					1R		1R	2R			
German Championship						2R			1R		
European Matchplay							1R				

=== Players Championships ===
Season	1	2	3	4	5	6	7	8	9	10	11	12	13	14	15	16	17	18	19	20	21	22	23	24	25	26	27	28	29	30	31	32	33	34
2023 (Note: Not a Tour card holder)	Did not participate												HIL; 1R	HIL; 1R	LEI; DNP		HIL; 1R	HIL; 1R	Did not participate															
2024	Did not participate																			WIG; 2R	WIG; 1R	Did not participate							LEI; 1R	LEI; 1R				
2025	Did not participate												ROS; 1R	ROS; 1R	HIL; 1R	HIL; 1R	Did not participate									HIL; 2R	HIL; 3R	Did not participate						

Performance Table Legend
W	Won the tournament	F	Finalist	SF	Semifinalist	QF	Quarterfinalist	#R; RR; Prel.	Lost in # round Round-robin; Preliminary round	DQ	Disqualified
DNQ	Did not qualify	DNP	Did not participate	WD	Withdrew	NH	Tournament not held	#R; RR; Prel.	Lost in # round Round-robin; Preliminary round	NYF	Not yet founded
