= Danny Jansen (darts player) =

Dutch darts player (born 2002)

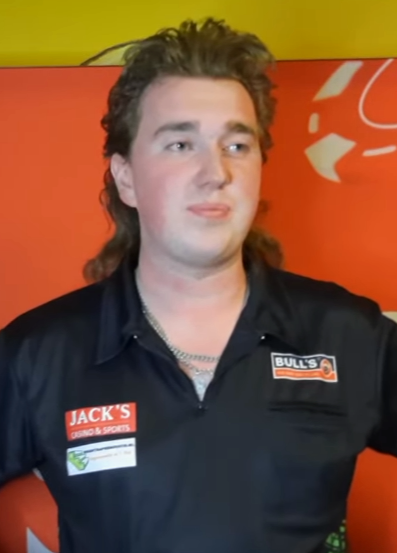
- Jansen in 2022

Personal information
- Nickname: "The Mullet"
- Born: 15 May 2002 (age 24) Holten, Netherlands

Sport
- Sport: Darts
- Playing since: 2018
- Darts: 26g Bull's
- Laterality: Right-handed
- Walk-on music: "Welcome to the Jungle" by Guns N' Roses

Organisation (see split in darts)
- PDC: 2022–present (Tour Card: 2022–2023)

WDF major events – best performances
- Dutch Open: Last 32: 2026

PDC premier events – best performances
- World Championship: Last 64: 2023
- UK Open: Last 96: 2022
- PC Finals: Last 64: 2022

Other tournament wins
- Years
| 2024 PDC Challenge Tour 2; 2024 PDC Development Tour 1 |
Players Championships
| 2022 PC9 |

Danny Jansen (born 15 May 2002) is a Dutch professional darts player who competes in Professional Darts Corporation events. Jansen won his first ranking PDC title at 2022 Players Championship 9. He also won a title on both the PDC's secondary tours, the PDC Challenge Tour and PDC Development Tour, in 2024.

== Career ==
=== 2022 ===
At 2022 PDC Q-School Jansen won a PDC Tour Card by finishing fifth on the European Q-School Order of Merit, this gave him a two-year card to play in Pro Tour events on the PDC circuit.

As he had gained a PDC Tour Card for 2022, Jansen played his debut played at his debut 2022 PDC Players Championship series.

On 1 April, Jansen played at the Players Championship 9 event, he defeated Andrew Gilding in the final to win the event.

=== 2024 ===
On 19 March, Jansen played at Players Championship 6, as a fill in for one of the absent Tour Card holders, earning his spot through being top of the 2024 PDC Challenge Tour series Order of Merit. He lost at the quarter-final stage, to Dirk van Duijvenbode, 6–5 in a deciding leg.

== World Championship results ==
=== PDC ===
- 2023: Second round (lost to Krzysztof Ratajski 1–3)

== Performance timeline ==
| Tournament | 2022 | 2023 | 2024 | 2025 |
|---|---|---|---|---|
PDC Ranked televised events
| World Championship | DNQ | 2R | DNQ | |
| UK Open | 3R | 4R | DNQ | 1R |
| Players Championship Finals | 1R | DNQ | | |
PDC Non-ranked televised events
| World Youth Championship | QF | WD | RR | 3R |
Career statistics
| Season-end ranking | 73 | 72 | 132 | |

PDC European Tour

| Season | 1 | 2 | 3 | 4 | 5 | 6 | 7 | 8 | 9 | 10 | 11 | 12 | 13 |
|---|---|---|---|---|---|---|---|---|---|---|---|---|---|
| 2022 | DNQ | | | ADO; 3R | DNQ | | EDG; 2R | DDC; 2R | Did not qualify | | | | |
| 2023 | Did not qualify | | | | | | | | | | | | GDC; 1R |

PDC Players Championships

| Season | 1 | 2 | 3 | 4 | 5 | 6 | 7 | 8 | 9 | 10 | 11 | 12 | 13 | 14 | 15 | 16 | 17 | 18 | 19 | 20 | 21 | 22 | 23 | 24 | 25 | 26 | 27 | 28 | 29 | 30 | 31 | 32 | 33 | 34 |
|---|---|---|---|---|---|---|---|---|---|---|---|---|---|---|---|---|---|---|---|---|---|---|---|---|---|---|---|---|---|---|---|---|---|---|
| 2022 | BAR; 2R | BAR; 2R | WIG; 1R | WIG; 3R | BAR; 1R | BAR; 1R | NIE; 1R | NIE; 4R | BAR; W | BAR; 1R | BAR; 1R | BAR; 2R | BAR; 1R | WIG; 1R | WIG; 1R | NIE; 1R | NIE; 1R | BAR; 1R | BAR; 1R | BAR; 1R | BAR; 3R | BAR; 3R | BAR; 1R | BAR; 1R | BAR; 1R | BAR; 1R | BAR; 2R | BAR; 1R | BAR; 4R | BAR; 1R | | | | |
| 2023 | BAR; 1R | BAR; 2R | BAR; 1R | BAR; 2R | BAR; 1R | BAR; 1R | HIL; 2R | HIL; 1R | WIG; 1R | WIG; 1R | LEI; 1R | LEI; 1R | HIL; 1R | HIL; 1R | LEI; DNP | LEI; DNP | HIL; 1R | HIL; 2R | BAR; 1R | BAR; 1R | BAR; 1R | BAR; 2R | BAR; 2R | BAR; 2R | BAR; 4R | BAR; 1R | BAR; 1R | BAR; 1R | BAR; 1R | BAR; 1R | | | | |
| 2024 (Note: Not a Tour card holder) | WIG; 1R | WIG; 2R | LEI; 2R | LEI; 1R | HIL; 3R | HIL; QF | LEI; DNP | LEI; DNP | HIL; 2R | HIL; 2R | HIL; 1R | HIL; 2R | MIL; 3R | MIL; 1R | MIL; DNP | | | MIL; 1R | MIL; 1R | WIG; DNP | WIG; DNP | LEI; 1R | LEI; 1R | WIG; 1R | WIG; 1R | WIG; 2R | WIG; 1R | WIG; 1R | LEI; 1R | LEI; 1R | | | | |
| 2025 | Did not participate | | | | | | HIL; 1R | HIL; 1R | Did not participate | | | | | | | | | | | | | | | | | | | | | | | | | |

Performance Table Legend
| W | Won the tournament | F | Finalist | SF | Semifinalist | QF | Quarterfinalist | #R; RR; L# | Lost in # round Round-robin; Last # stage | DQ | Disqualified |
| DNQ | Did not qualify | DNP | Did not participate | WD | Withdrew | NH | Tournament not held | #R; RR; L# | Lost in # round Round-robin; Last # stage | NYF | Not yet founded |
