= 2022 German Darts Open =

2022 edition of German Darts Open

2022 Interwetten German Darts Open

Tournament information
- Dates: 9–11 September 2022
- Venue: Sparkassen-Arena
- Location: Jena, Germany
- Organisation(s): Professional Darts Corporation (PDC)
- Format: Legs
- Prize fund: £140,000
- Winner's share: £25,000
- High checkout: 164; Jamie Hughes; Daryl Gurney

Champion(s)
- Peter Wright (SCO)

The 2022 Interwetten German Darts Open was the eleventh of thirteen PDC European Tour events on the 2022 PDC Pro Tour. The tournament took place at the Sparkassen-Arena, Jena, Germany, from 9 to 11 September 2022. It featured a field of 48 players and £140,000 in prize money, with £25,000 going to the winner.

Michael van Gerwen was the defending champion after defeating Ian White 8–3 in the 2019 final. However, he withdrew from the tournament before it started.

Peter Wright won his seventh European Tour title, defeating Dimitri Van den Bergh 8–6 in the final.

== Prize money ==
The prize money was unchanged from the European Tours of the last 3 years:

Stage (num. of players)		Prize money
Winner	(1)	£25,000
Runner-up	(1)	£10,000
Semi-finalists	(2)	£6,500
Quarter-finalists	(4)	£5,000
Third round losers	(8)	£3,000
Second round losers	(16)	£2,000*
First round losers	(16)	£1,000*
Total	£140,000	

- Seeded players who lose in the second round and host nation qualifiers (who qualify automatically as a result of their ranking) who lose in their first match of the event shall not be credited with prize money on any Order of Merit. A player who qualifies as a qualifier, but later becomes a seed due to the withdrawal of one or more other players shall be credited with their prize money on all Orders of Merit regardless of how far they progress in the event.

== Qualification and format ==
The top 16 entrants from the PDC ProTour Order of Merit on 28 June automatically qualified for the event and were seeded in the second round.

The remaining 32 places went to players from six qualifying events – 24 from the Tour Card Holder Qualifier (held on 7 July), two from the Associate Member Qualifier (held on 23 April), the two highest ProTour ranking German players, two from the Host Nation Qualifier (held on 23 April), one from the Nordic & Baltic Associate Member Qualifier (held on 4 June), and one from the East European Associate Member Qualifier (held on 25 June).

Seeds Michael van Gerwen and Michael Smith, and qualifiers Adrian Lewis and Darren Webster withdrew, with Martin Schindler and Dave Chisnall moving into the seeded positions and four byes being given in the first round.

The following players took part in the tournament:

Top 16

1. Luke Humphries (quarter-finals)
2. Gerwyn Price (quarter-finals)
3. Rob Cross (third round)
4. Peter Wright (champion)
5. Damon Heta (third round)
6. Ryan Searle (second round)
7. Nathan Aspinall (second round)
8. Dirk van Duijvenbode (second round)
9. Joe Cullen (semi-finals)
10. José de Sousa (semi-finals)
11. Dimitri Van den Bergh (runner-up)
12. Danny Noppert (second round)
13. Jonny Clayton (third round)
14. Krzysztof Ratajski (quarter-finals)
15. Martin Schindler (third round)
16. Dave Chisnall (third round)

Tour Card Qualifier
- Ian White (first round)
- Lewy Williams (second round)
- Daryl Gurney (third round)
- Keane Barry (first round)
- Jamie Hughes (first round)
- Luke Woodhouse (third round)
- Martin Lukeman (second round)
- Raymond van Barneveld (second round)
- Jeff Smith (first round)
- Bradley Brooks (second round)
- Geert Nentjes (second round)
- Steve Beaton (third round)
- Joe Murnan (second round)
- Connor Scutt (first round)
- David Evans (second round)
- Jim Williams (second round)
- Martijn Kleermaker (first round)
- John Henderson (first round)
- Josh Rock (first round)
- Ross Smith (quarter-finals)
- Alan Soutar (second round)

Associate Member Qualifier
- Scott Williams (first round)
- Danny van Trijp (second round)

Highest Ranked Germans
- Gabriel Clemens (first round)

Host Nation Qualifier
- Lukas Wenig (first round)
- Dragutin Horvat (second round)

Nordic & Baltic Qualifier
- Daniel Larsson (second round)

East European Qualifier
- Karel Sedláček (first round)

== Draw ==
First round (best of 11 legs); 9 September
Jamie Hughes 96.88	5
Daniel Larsson 90.71	6
Bradley Brooks 95.18	6
Scott Williams 85.45	3
Daryl Gurney 89.85	6
Connor Scutt 85.91	3
Joe Murnan
bye
Ian White 79.64	0
Raymond van Barneveld 91.09	6
Karel Sedláček 92.81	5
Jim Williams 89.88	6
Alan Soutar 88.30	6
Lukas Wenig 85.03	3
Ross Smith
bye
Lewy Williams
bye
Danny van Trijp 92.97	6
John Henderson 85.26	0
Steve Beaton
bye
Dragutin Horvat 79.55	6
Jeff Smith 81.96	4
Gabriel Clemens 107.35	1
Martin Lukeman 103.58	6
Josh Rock 89.34	0
Geert Nentjes 98.02	6
Keane Barry 94.75	5
Luke Woodhouse 97.79	6
Martijn Kleermaker 89.24	3
David Evans 84.18	6

Second round (best of 11 legs); 10 September
1	Luke Humphries 97.98	6
Daniel Larsson 89.28	3
16	Dave Chisnall 95.13	6
Bradley Brooks 87.07	2
8	Dirk van Duijvenbode 89.01	3
Daryl Gurney 90.51	6
9	Joe Cullen 96.11	6
Joe Murnan 95.58	5
4	Peter Wright 99.88	6
Raymond van Barneveld 91.02	3
13	Jonny Clayton 93.61	6
Jim Williams 96.97	4
5	Damon Heta 101.32	6
Alan Soutar 86.26	2
12	Danny Noppert 96.47	5
Ross Smith 98.90	6
2	Gerwyn Price 95.33	6
Lewy Williams 98.32	4
15	Martin Schindler 88.17	6
Danny van Trijp 84.52	3
7	Nathan Aspinall 89.13	4
Steve Beaton 89.57	6
10	José de Sousa 90.93	6
Dragutin Horvat 78.09	4
3	Rob Cross 100.48	6
Martin Lukeman 93.60	1
14	Krzysztof Ratajski 89.03	6
Geert Nentjes 90.92	5
6	Ryan Searle 88.23	3
Luke Woodhouse 89.62	6
11	Dimitri Van den Bergh 91.94	6
David Evans 89.25	2

Third round (best of 11 legs); 11 September
1	Humphries 105.29	6
16	Chisnall 93.10	3
Gurney 92.41	5
9	Cullen 97.95	6
4	Wright 98.08	6
13	Clayton 98.35	3
5	Heta 94.29	3
R. Smith 106.66	6
2	Price 106.13	6
15	Schindler 93.16	1
Beaton 99.17	3
10	Sousa 100.87	6
3	Cross 86.49	5
14	Ratajski 90.32	6
Woodhouse 92.54	5
11	Van den Bergh 92.46	6

Quarter-finals (best of 11 legs); 11 September
1	Humphries 92.16	5
9	Cullen 91.29	6
4	Wright 100.85	6
R. Smith 87.68	2
2	Price 100.45	5
10	Sousa 95.71	6
14	Ratajski 89.89	3
11	Van den Bergh 91.74	6

Semi-finals (best of 13 legs); 11 September
9	Cullen 85.11	4
4	Wright 101.71	7
10	Sousa 85.39	3
11	Van den Bergh 95.07	7

Final (best of 15 legs); 11 September
4	Wright 99.75	8
11	Van den Bergh 92.74	6
