= Daniel Klose =

German darts player (born 1979)

Personal information
- Full name: Daniel Klose
- Nickname: Dan The Man
- Born: 30 October 1979 (age 47) Ansbach, Germany
- Home town: Bechhofen (Mittelfranken), Germany

Sport
- Sport: Darts
- Playing since: 2019
- Darts: 20g
- Laterality: Right-handed
- Walk-on music: "Bang" by Gorky Park "You're the Best" by Joe Esposito

Organisation (see split in darts)
- PDC: 2019–present (Tour Card: 2023–2024)
- Current world ranking: (PDC) 133 ▲4 (29 October 2026)

PDC premier events – best performances
- UK Open: Last 64: 2024
- PC Finals: Last 64: 2023
- World Series Finals: Last 24: 2023

Other tournament wins
- Years
PDC Challenge Tour (×2)	2026 (×2)
PDC Europe Next Gen (×6)	2025 (×3), 2026 (×3)

Daniel Klose (born 30 October 1979) is a German professional darts player who competes in Professional Darts Corporation (PDC) events. He finished as the runner-up at 2023 PDC Players Championship 21.

== Career ==
=== 2019 ===
Klose qualified for his first PDC European Tour tournament, the 2019 European Darts Grand Prix, as one of four Host Nation qualifiers, but he lost in the first round to Keegan Brown 6–3.

=== 2020 ===
In November 2020, he qualified for the PDC Europe Super League Darts 2020, where he reached the quarter-finals after finishing top Group B. He won six wins in his seven games, defeating Manfred Bilderl 6–5 in a deciding leg, beating René Eidams 6–1, Dragutin Horvat and Nico Kurz both 6–2, Karsten Koch 6–3, and Thomas Köhnlein 6–4, with his one loss being to Maik Langendorf. He lost to Michael Unterbuchner 8–4 in the quarter-finals.

=== 2021 ===
In his second Super League participation in the 2021 edition, he was eliminated in the preliminary round, finishing bottom of Group D with only 2 points, having only won two of his 10 games, a 6–2 win over Steffen Siepmann and a 6–4 win against René Eidams.

=== 2022 ===
He was subsequently unable to win a Tour Card at European Q-School, failing to reach the final stage, but his attendance at Q-School did grant him access to play in the 2022 PDC Challenge Tour series.

On 22 January he reached the quarter-finals at Challenge Tour 3, losing there to Matthew Edgar 5–4 in a deciding leg. He reached a second quarter-final of the year at Challenge Tour 12 on 15 July, being whitewashed there 5–0 by Chas Barstow, who averaged 107.36 to Klose’s 88.45 On 17 September Klose reached the semi-finals of Challenge Tour 18. He whitewashed Jim Moston 5–0, averaging 100.20 to Moston's 86.78, to reach his first semi-final of the year from his third quarter-final of the year. He lost to eventual winner Jurjen van der Velde 5–2 in the semi-finals.

On 26 & 27 March, Klose received call–ups for 2022 PDC Players Championship series events 7 and 8 filling in as a reserve for an absent tour card holder virtue of his ranking on the Challenge Tour Order of Merit. This was his PDC Pro Tour debut. He lost in the first round on both occasions, to Steve Lennon 6–1 and Brendan Dolan 6–3 respectively.

In November, he again took part in the PDC Europe Super League, where he narrowly lost 8–7 in the semi-finals to eventual winner Florian Hempel.

=== 2023 ===
At 2023 European Q-School he won a two-year Pro Tour card. He made the first PDC final of his career at the Players Championship 21 event in September, losing to Gerwyn Price. After Max Hopp, Gabriel Clemens, Martin Schindler and Ricardo Pietreczko, he was the fifth German to reach the final of a PDC professional tournament.

In September 2023, Klose managed to qualify for the 2023 World Series of Darts Finals via the Tour Card Holder Qualifier. He lost in the first round to Krzysztof Ratajski 6–3.

As 54th seed he qualified for 2023 Players Championship Finals, and on his debut he lost to Ryan Joyce 6–3 in the first round.

On 27 November 2023, he took part in the "Tour Card Holder Qualifier", the last opportunity to qualify for the 2024 PDC World Darts Championship. He only just missed out on his World Championship debut when he lost to Darren Webster 7–5 in the final.

=== 2024 ===
Klose made it to the Fourth round at 2024 UK Open, but it was the only major tournament he appeared on. He qualified for two European Tour events, reaching Third round at 2024 Austrian Darts Open, his best result. After failing to qualify for 2025 PDC World Darts Championship, Klose lost his Tour card.

=== 2026 ===
On 27 March 2026, Klose won his first Challenge Tour event (CT7), defeating Callum Goffin 5–3 in the final.

== Performance timeline ==
Daniel Klose's performance timeline is as follows:

=== PDC ===
Tournament	2023	2024
PDC Ranked televised events
UK Open	2R	4R
Players Championship Finals	1R	DNQ
PDC Non-ranked televised events
World Series Finals	1R	DNQ
Career statistics
PDC Year-end ranking	101 (Note: Received Tour card through Q School and started the season without ranking points)	78

==== European Tour ====
Tournament	2019	2023	2024	2025	2026
European Grand Prix	1R	DNQ		2R	DNQ
European Matchplay	DNQ	1R	Not held		
German Open	DNQ	1R	Not held		
Belgian Open	NH	DNQ	1R	DNQ	
Austrian Open	DNQ		3R	DNQ	
European Trophy	Not held			1R	DNQ
International Open	Not held			1R	DNQ
Baltic Sea Open	NH	Did not qualify			1R
European Open	Did not qualify				1R

==== Players Championships ====
Season	1	2	3	4	5	6	7	8	9	10	11	12	13	14	15	16	17	18	19	20	21	22	23	24	25	26	27	28	29	30	31	32	33	34
2022 (Note: Not a Tour card holder)	Did not participate						NIE; 1R	NIE; 1R	Did not participate																									
2023	BAR; 1R	BAR; 1R	BAR; 2R	BAR; 2R	BAR; 2R	BAR; 1R	HIL; 1R	HIL; 2R	WIG; 2R	WIG; 2R	LEI; 2R	LEI; 1R	HIL; 1R	HIL; 1R	LEI; 1R	LEI; 1R	HIL; 1R	HIL; 1R	BAR; 1R	BAR; 1R	BAR; F	BAR; 1R	BAR; 1R	BAR; 2R	BAR; 4R	BAR; 3R	BAR; 1R	BAR; 1R	BAR; 2R	BAR; 2R				
2024	WIG; 1R	WIG; 1R	LEI; 1R	LEI; 2R	HIL; 1R	HIL; 2R	LEI; 3R	LEI; 1R	HIL; 1R	HIL; 3R	HIL; 2R	HIL; 3R	MIL; 2R	MIL; 1R	MIL; 1R	MIL; 1R	MIL; 1R	MIL; 2R	MIL; 1R	WIG; 1R	WIG; 1R	LEI; 2R	LEI; 1R	WIG; 1R	WIG; 2R	WIG; 1R	WIG; 1R	WIG; 1R	LEI; 2R	LEI; 2R				
2026	Did not participate								WIG; 1R	WIG; 4R	MIL; DNP		HIL; 2R	HIL; 1R	Did not participate										HIL; 1R	HIL; 1R	LEI; 1R	LEI; 1R	ROS; 2R	ROS; 2R	ROS; 2R	ROS; 2R	LEI; DNP	

Performance Table Legend
W	Won the tournament	F	Finalist	SF	Semifinalist	QF	Quarterfinalist	#R; RR; Prel.	Lost in # round Round-robin; Preliminary round	DQ	Disqualified
DNQ	Did not qualify	DNP	Did not participate	WD	Withdrew	NH	Tournament not held	#R; RR; Prel.	Lost in # round Round-robin; Preliminary round	NYF	Not yet founded
