= Dariusz Marciniak =

Dariusz Marciniak may refer to:

- Dariusz Marciniak (footballer)
- Dariusz Marciniak (darts player)
