= 2022 PDC Challenge Tour =

Professional Darts Event

The 2022 PDC Winmau Challenge Tour consisted of 24 darts tournaments on the 2022 PDC Pro Tour.

== Prize money ==
The prize money for the Challenge Tour events remained the same from 2021, with each event having a prize fund of £10,000.

This is how the prize money is divided:

Stage (no. of players)		Prize money (Total: £10,000)
Winner	(1)	£2,000
Runner-up	(1)	£1,000
Semi-finalists	(2)	£500
Quarter-finalists	(4)	£300
Last 16	(8)	£200
Last 32	(16)	£100
Last 64	(32)	£50

== January ==
=== Challenge Tour 1 ===
Challenge Tour 1 was contested on Friday 21 January 2022 at the Arena MK in Milton Keynes. The tournament was won by Scott Williams, who defeated Robert Owen 5–2 in the final.

Quarter-finals (best of 9 legs)
Jim McEwan 80.21	5
James Richardson 77.45	1
Robert Owen 87.51	5
Michael Flynn 91.06	2
Scott Williams 83.06	5
Darren Johnson 76.14	3
Danny Lauby 93.00	5
Robert Rickwood 81.78	2

Semi-finals (best of 9 legs)
Jim McEwan 83.70	4
Robert Owen 89.37	5
Scott Williams 89.67	5
Danny Lauby 93.14	1

Final (best of 9 legs)
Robert Owen 89.54	2
Scott Williams 88.81	5

=== Challenge Tour 2 ===
Challenge Tour 2 was contested on Friday 21 January 2022 at the Arena MK in Milton Keynes. The tournament was won by Scott Williams, who defeated Lee Evans 5–2 in the final.

Quarter-finals (best of 9 legs)
Lee Evans 85.37	5
Jim Moston 73.13	1
Chris Gilliland 93.92	5
Andy Jenkins 88.92	4
Karel Sedláček 101.59	5
Thibault Tricole 94.53	2
Scott Williams 91.20	5
Scott Marsh 92.84	4

Semi-finals (best of 9 legs)
Lee Evans 96.11	5
Chris Gilliland 84.71	4
Karel Sedláček 97.80	2
Scott Williams 100.04	5

Final (best of 9 legs)
Lee Evans 87.97	2
Scott Williams 95.83	5

=== Challenge Tour 3 ===
Challenge Tour 3 was contested on Saturday 22 January 2022 at the Arena MK in Milton Keynes. The tournament was won by Steve Haggerty, who defeated Haupai Puha 5–4 in the final.

Quarter-finals (best of 9 legs)
Matthew Edgar 79.26	5
Daniel Klose 82.68	4
Steve Haggerty 77.66	5
Graham Hall 77.60	3
Haupai Puha 100.41	5
Jim McEwan 85.89	2
Lee Evans 93.66	5
Andy Jenkins 87.42	1

Semi-finals (best of 9 legs)
Matthew Edgar 81.11	4
Steve Haggerty 79.19	5
Haupai Puha 100.01	5
Lee Evans 91.59	2

Final (best of 9 legs)
Steve Haggerty 81.44	5
Haupai Puha 90.74	4

=== Challenge Tour 4 ===
Challenge Tour 4 was contested on Saturday 22 January 2022 at the Arena MK in Milton Keynes. The tournament was won by Stu Wilson, who defeated Peter Burgoyne 5–3 in the final.

Quarter-finals (best of 9 legs)
Ryan de Vreede 88.86	5
Roman Benecký 81.88	4
Peter Burgoyne 87.00	5
Jeremy van der Winkel 81.40	2
Stu Wilson 79.56	5
Leighton Bennett 78.28	2
Gavin Carlin 79.42	5
Carlo van Peer 75.82	4

Semi-finals (best of 9 legs)
Ryan de Vreede 87.58	2
Peter Burgoyne 91.53	5
Stu Wilson 82.95	5
Gavin Carlin 84.50	3

Final (best of 9 legs)
Peter Burgoyne 85.10	3
Stu Wilson 93.85	5

=== Challenge Tour 5 ===
Challenge Tour 5 was contested on Sunday 23 January 2022 at the Arena MK in Milton Keynes. The tournament was won by Jim McEwan, who whitewashed Stephen Burton 5–0 in the final.

Quarter-finals (best of 9 legs)
Matthew Edgar 84.76	5
Keelan Kay 77.53	2
Stephen Burton 98.56	5
Jason Hogg 95.66	3
Jim McEwan 85.40	5
Steven Noster 74.79	0
Darren Penhall 93.13	5
Thomas Lovely 83.18	1

Semi-finals (best of 9 legs)
Matthew Edgar 88.19	0
Stephen Burton 90.54	5
Jim McEwan 97.34	5
Darren Penhall 90.29	1

Final (best of 9 legs)
Stephen Burton 87.00	0
Jim McEwan 97.60	5

== April ==
=== Challenge Tour 6 ===
Challenge Tour 6 was contested on Friday 1 April 2022 at the Halle 39 in Hildesheim. The tournament was won by Scott Williams.

Quarter-finals (best of 9 legs)
Nathan Girvan 101.80	5
Graham Usher 93.07	1
Scott Marsh 88.50	5
Michael Flynn 87.83	3
Peter Jacques 90.18	5
Jeremy van der Winkel 84.85	2
Scott Williams 93.16	5
Kenny Neyens 90.78	1

Semi-finals (best of 9 legs)
Nathan Girvan 90.71	4
Scott Marsh 91.80	5
Peter Jacques 83.93	1
Scott Williams 91.63	5

Final (best of 9 legs)
Scott Marsh 92.35	4
Scott Williams 94.28	5

=== Challenge Tour 7 ===
Challenge Tour 7 was contested on Friday 1 April 2022 at the Halle 39 in Hildesheim. The tournament was won by Stefan Bellmont.

Quarter-finals (best of 9 legs)
Karel Sedláček 91.28	5
Jeremy van der Winkel 88.35	2
Sebastian Białecki 98.65	5
Kenny Neyens 88.02	1
Stefan Bellmont 95.55	5
Toni Alcinas 87.57	1
Nathan Girvan 85.03	5
Michael Flynn 89.47	4

Semi-finals (best of 9 legs)
Karel Sedláček 104.58	5
Sebastian Białecki 93.47	1
Stefan Bellmont 91.07	5
Nathan Girvan 94.35	4

Final (best of 9 legs)
Karel Sedláček 87.87	4
Stefan Bellmont 87.94	5

=== Challenge Tour 8 ===
Challenge Tour 8 was contested on Saturday 2 April 2022 at the Halle 39 in Hildesheim. The tournament was won by Stephen Burton.

Quarter-finals (best of 9 legs)
Danny van Trijp 100.52	5
Dan Read 86.18	4
David Pallett 86.74	5
Sebastian Białecki 86.22	4
Stephen Burton 92.78	5
Patrick Peters 82.77	0
Thomas Lovely 78.33	5
Kevin Blomme 76.44	3

Semi-finals (best of 9 legs)
Danny van Trijp 83.72	5
David Pallett 86.64	4
Stephen Burton 101.80	5
Thomas Lovely 85.01	1

Final (best of 9 legs)
Danny van Trijp 82.62	0
Stephen Burton 95.13	5

=== Challenge Tour 9 ===
Challenge Tour 9 was contested on Saturday 2 April 2022 at the Halle 39 in Hildesheim. The tournament was won by Danny van Trijp.

Quarter-finals (best of 9 legs)
Danny van Trijp 100.61	5
Matthew Edgar 96.40	3
Christian Kist 97.54	5
Jelle Klaasen 90.06	2
Kenny Neyens 90.50	5
Roy van de Griendt 83.55	3
Lukas Wenig 94.72	5
Jeremy van der Winkel 88.19	2

Semi-finals (best of 9 legs)
Danny van Trijp 89.82	5
Christian Kist 88.22	3
Kenny Neyens 85.03	3
Lukas Wenig 90.02	5

Final (best of 9 legs)
Danny van Trijp 92.59	5
Lukas Wenig 85.25	2

=== Challenge Tour 10 ===
Challenge Tour 10 was contested on Sunday 3 April 2022 at the Halle 39 in Hildesheim. The tournament was won by Andy Jenkins.

Quarter-finals (best of 9 legs)
Gavin Carlin 89.75	5
Scott Marsh 81.89	4
Andy Jenkins 89.59	5
Paulo Ferreira 82.53	3
Robert Owen 79.95	5
Gary Blades 73.67	0
Karel Sedláček 94.12	5
Stephen Burton 95.24	3

Semi-finals (best of 9 legs)
Gavin Carlin 90.00	2
Andy Jenkins 94.75	5
Robert Owen 86.27	3
Karel Sedláček 87.73	5

Final (best of 9 legs)
Andy Jenkins 94.27	5
Karel Sedláček 84.74	3

== July ==
=== Challenge Tour 11 ===
Challenge Tour 11 was contested on Friday 15 July 2022 at the Halle 39 in Hildesheim. The tournament was won by Danny van Trijp, who defeated Jelle Klaasen 5–2 in the final.

Quarter-finals (best of 9 legs)
Roemer Mooijman 81.88	1
Graham Usher 93.56	5
Darryl Pilgrim 85.69	3
Jelle Klaasen 92.81	5
Karel Sedláček 92.97	5
Chris Landman 85.86	2
Danny van Trijp 83.67	5
Patrick van den Boogard 85.44	4

Semi-finals (best of 9 legs)
Graham Usher 84.16	4
Jelle Klaasen 86.31	5
Karel Sedláček 91.49	4
Danny van Trijp 87.38	5

Final (best of 9 legs)
Jelle Klaasen 92.19	2
Danny van Trijp 95.86	5

=== Challenge Tour 12 ===
Challenge Tour 12 was contested on Friday 15 July 2022 at the Halle 39 in Hildesheim. The tournament was won by Gian van Veen, who defeated David Pallett 5–4 in the final.

Quarter-finals (best of 9 legs)
David Pallett 87.62	5
Jeremy van der Winkel 81.97	2
Chas Barstow 107.36	5
Daniel Klose 88.45	0
Ciarán Teehan 87.66	2
Gian van Veen 89.24	5
Davy Proosten 98.04	5
Steven Beasley 88.88	1

Semi-finals (best of 9 legs)
David Pallett 85.72	5
Chas Barstow 89.69	4
Gian van Veen 100.20	5
Davy Proosten 88.04	0

Final (best of 9 legs)
David Pallett 88.02	4
Gian van Veen 97.81	5

=== Challenge Tour 13 ===
Challenge Tour 13 was contested on Saturday 16 July 2022 at the Halle 39 in Hildesheim. The tournament was won by Jurjen van der Velde.

Quarter-finals (best of 9 legs)
Jurjen van der Velde 93.37	5
Dan Read 90.44	2
Stephen Burton 86.72	5
Fabian Schmutzler 84.93	2
Robert Owen 92.35	5
Roemer Mooijman 77.82	1
Davy Proosten 86.37	2
Darryl Pilgrim 89.97	5

Semi-finals (best of 9 legs)
Jurjen van der Velde 87.15	5
Stephen Burton 82.29	2
Robert Owen 99.09	5
Darryl Pilgrim 90.27	2

Final (best of 9 legs)
Jurjen van der Velde 92.79	5
Robert Owen 88.27	3

=== Challenge Tour 14 ===
Challenge Tour 14 was contested on Saturday 16 July 2022 at the Halle 39 in Hildesheim. The tournament was won by Kenny Neyens.

Quarter-finals (best of 9 legs)
Graham Usher 86.80	2
Kenny Neyens 93.57	5
Franz Rötzsch 76.43	1
Jelle Klaasen 96.13	5
Michael Flynn 91.62	5
Robert Owen 83.31	3
Lukas Wenig 87.12	5
Kevin Garcia 81.73	1

Semi-finals (best of 9 legs)
Kenny Neyens 97.86	5
Jelle Klaasen 87.57	1
Michael Flynn 86.26	5
Lukas Wenig 87.21	3

Final (best of 9 legs)
Kenny Neyens 82.54	5
Michael Flynn 81.28	4

=== Challenge Tour 15 ===
Challenge Tour 15 was contested on Sunday 17 July 2022 at the Halle 39 in Hildesheim. The tournament was won by David Pallett.

Quarter-finals (best of 9 legs)
Dennie Olde Kalter 88.41	5
François Schweyen 78.04	0
Gavin Carlin 88.44	4
Jan Hlavácek 86.39	5
Lukas Wenig 100.18	5
Christopher Wickenden 91.42	2
Jacques Labre 92.07	1
David Pallett 104.68	5

Semi-finals (best of 9 legs)
Dennie Olde Kalter 93.94	5
Jan Hlavácek 87.58	0
Lukas Wenig 93.09	4
David Pallett 97.38	5

Final (best of 9 legs)
Dennie Olde Kalter 90.23	3
David Pallett 95.38	5

== September ==
=== Challenge Tour 16 ===
Challenge Tour 16 was contested on Friday 16 September 2022 at the Leicester Arena in Leicester. The tournament was won by Robert Owen.

Quarter-finals (best of 9 legs)
Matthew Dennant 84.69	1
Robert Owen 97.33	5
Robert Thornton 79.78	5
David Wawrzewski 75.94	2
Christian Kist 85.75	5
Llew Bevan 87.37	3
John Bowles 86.38	5
Prakash Jiwa 81.14	0

Semi-finals (best of 9 legs)
Robert Owen 95.69	5
Robert Thornton 91.75	4
Christian Kist 93.02	5
John Bowles 86.71	3

Final (best of 9 legs)
Robert Owen 94.46	5
Christian Kist 85.98	2

=== Challenge Tour 17 ===
Challenge Tour 17 was contested on Friday 16 September 2022 at the Leicester Arena in Leicester. The tournament was won by Wesley Plaisier.

Quarter-finals (best of 9 legs)
Karel Sedláček 97.67	5
Lukas Wenig 99.56	1
Dan Read 81.88	0
Robert Thornton 96.35	5
Martijn Dragt 82.87	5
Jurjen van der Velde 85.08	3
Wesley Plaisier 101.75	5
Lewis Pride 96.45	3

Semi-finals (best of 9 legs)
Karel Sedláček 99.85	3
Robert Thornton 103.75	5
Martijn Dragt 88.96	2
Wesley Plaisier 94.23	5

Final (best of 9 legs)
Robert Thornton 86.88	3
Wesley Plaisier 90.34	5

=== Challenge Tour 18 ===
Challenge Tour 18 was contested on Saturday 17 September 2022 at the Leicester Arena in Leicester. The tournament was won by Jurjen van der Velde.

Quarter-finals (best of 9 legs)
Graham Usher 89.18	5
Scott Williams 86.06	2
Patrick Peters 77.68	5
Jan Hlavácek 75.03	1
Alan Tabern 85.85	0
Jurjen van der Velde 90.54	5
Jim Moston 86.78	0
Daniel Klose 100.20	5

Semi-finals (best of 9 legs)
Graham Usher 88.59	3
Patrick Peters 97.38	5
Jurjen van der Velde 85.50	5
Daniel Klose 84.21	2

Final (best of 9 legs)
Patrick Peters 86.36	4
Jurjen van der Velde 89.06	5

=== Challenge Tour 19 ===
Challenge Tour 19 was contested on Saturday 17 September 2022 at the Leicester Arena in Leicester. The tournament was won by Christian Kist.

Quarter-finals (best of 9 legs)
Thibault Tricole 84.84	2
Christian Kist 87.58	5
Jacques Labre 80.01	4
Karel Sedláček 75.41	5
Kai Fan Leung 79.13	5
Alan Tabern 82.18	1
Danny Lauby 86.47	5
Jeroen Mioch 88.57	2

Semi-finals (best of 9 legs)
Christian Kist 91.03	5
Karel Sedláček 84.61	3
Kai Fan Leung 81.71	0
Danny Lauby 97.60	5

Final (best of 9 legs)
Christian Kist 79.88	5
Danny Lauby 82.45	3

=== Challenge Tour 20 ===
Challenge Tour 20 was contested on Sunday 18 September 2022 at the Leicester Arena in Leicester. The tournament was won by Scott Williams.

Quarter-finals (best of 9 legs)
Darryl Pilgrim 86.13	2
Dan Read 94.90	5
Kai Fan Leung 86.60	2
Scott Williams 86.85	5
Owen Roelofs 91.39	5
Danny Lauby 91.50	2
Thibault Tricole 90.77	5
David Pallett 80.40	3

Semi-finals (best of 9 legs)
Dan Read 86.64	1
Scott Williams 92.60	5
Owen Roelofs 85.19	2
Thibault Tricole 88,84	5

Final (best of 9 legs)
Scott Williams 91.00	5
Thibault Tricole 77.89	2

== October ==
=== Challenge Tour 21 ===
Challenge Tour 21 was contested on Saturday 15 October 2022 at the Leicester Arena in Leicester. The tournament was won by Thibault Tricole, who became the first French winner of a PDC event.

Quarter-finals (best of 9 legs)
Reece Robinson 85.79	1
Owen Roelofs 102.34	5
Colin Osborne 79.94	3
Gian van Veen 88.36	5
Ben West 87.44	1
Thibault Tricole 90.75	5
Carlo van Peer 87.45	5
Jelle Klaasen 93.40	2

Semi-finals (best of 9 legs)
Owen Roelofs 90.68	1
Gian van Veen 97.38	5
Thibault Tricole 86.01	5
Carlo van Peer 82.38	4

Final (best of 9 legs)
Gian van Veen 86.13	3
Thibault Tricole 94.16	5

=== Challenge Tour 22 ===
Challenge Tour 22 was contested on Saturday 15 October 2022 at the Leicester Arena in Leicester. The tournament was won by Jacques Labre, who completed a French double on the day.

Quarter-finals (best of 9 legs)
Daniel Ayres 78.88	1
Robert Owen 83.70	5
Ryan Hogarth 84.16	3
Jacques Labre 90.68	5
Geoffrey Murray 89.31	2
Nathan Girvan 87.46	5
Christian Kist 91.00	4
Lee Evans 88.64	5

Semi-finals (best of 9 legs)
Robert Owen 96.09	4
Jacques Labre 97.50	5
Nathan Girvan 91.02	3
Lee Evans 88.63	5

Final (best of 9 legs)
Jacques Labre 87.82	5
Lee Evans 88.35	3

=== Challenge Tour 23 ===
Challenge Tour 23 was contested on Sunday 16 October 2022 at the Leicester Arena in Leicester. The tournament was won by Justin Smith.

Quarter-finals (best of 9 legs)
Jeremy van der Winkel 101.12	1
Matthew Dennant 99.10	5
Scott Taylor 92.86	5
Ciarán Teehan 91.91	2
Lee Davies 87.31	1
Nathan Girvan 102.27	5
Jordan Brooks 85.27	2
Justin Smith 87.27	5

Semi-finals (best of 9 legs)
Matthew Dennant 90.86	5
Scott Taylor 96.58	3
Nathan Girvan 96.93	3
Justin Smith 83.40	5

Final (best of 9 legs)
Matthew Dennant 82.68	2
Justin Smith 83.42	5

=== Challenge Tour 24 ===
Challenge Tour 24 was contested on Sunday 16 October 2022 at the Leicester Arena in Leicester. The tournament was won by Andy Hamilton.

Quarter-finals (best of 9 legs)
Danny van Trijp 91.42	2
Andy Hamilton 93.98	5
Lee Budgen 83.48	5
Ryan Hogarth 81.09	4
Jim McEwan 92.32	2
Scott Taylor 92.47	5
Scott Campbell 83.52	4
Wayne Jones 80.96	5

Semi-finals (best of 9 legs)
Andy Hamilton 96.53	5
Lee Budgen 90.16	2
Scott Taylor 98.74	5
Wayne Jones 90.62	4

Final (best of 9 legs)
Andy Hamilton 89.27	5
Scott Taylor 90.19	4
