= 2025 Austrian Darts Open =

2025 Elten Safety Shoes Austrian Darts Open

Tournament information
- Dates: 25–27 April 2025
- Venue: Premstättner Halle
- Location: Graz, Austria
- Organisation(s): Professional Darts Corporation (PDC)
- Format: Legs; Final – first to 8 legs
- Prize fund: £175,000
- Winner's share: £30,000
- High checkout: 170 Daryl Gurney

Champion(s)
- Martin Schindler (GER)

The 2025 Austrian Darts Open (known for sponsorship reasons as the 2025 Elten Safety Shoes Austrian Darts Open) for sponsorship reasons, was a professional darts tournament that took place at the Premstättner Halle in Graz, Austria, from 25 to 27 April 2025. It was the fifth of fourteen PDC European Tour events on the 2025 PDC Pro Tour. It featured a field of 48 players and £175,000 in prize money, with £30,000 going to the winner.

Luke Littler won the 2024 edition after beating Joe Cullen 8–4 in the final. However, Littler chose not to play in the event, and thus did not defend his title.

Martin Schindler won the title, his third on the European Tour, defeating Ross Smith 8–4 in the final.

== Prize money ==
The prize fund remained at £175,000, with £30,000 to the winner:

Stage (num. of players)		Prize money
Winner	(1)	£30,000
Runner-up	(1)	£12,000
Semi-finalists	(2)	£8,500
Quarter-finalists	(4)	£6,000
Third round losers	(8)	£4,000
Second round losers	(16)	£2,500*
First round losers	(16)	£1,250*
Total	£175,000	

- Pre-qualified players from the Orders of Merit who lose in their first match of the event shall not be credited with prize money on any Order of Merit. A player who qualifies as a qualifier, but later becomes a seed due to the withdrawal of one or more other players shall be credited with their prize money on all Orders of Merit regardless of how far they progress in the event.

== Qualification and format ==
In a change from the previous year, the top 16 on the two-year main PDC Order of Merit ranking were now seeded and entered the tournament in the second round, while the 16 qualifiers from the one-year PDC Pro Tour Order of Merit ranking entered in the first round. The seedings were confirmed on 27 March.

The remaining 16 places will go to players from four qualifying events – 10 from the Tour Card Holder Qualifier (held on 2 April), four from the Host Nation Qualifier (held on 24 April), one from the Nordic & Baltic Associate Member Qualifier (held on 28 March) and one from the East European Associate Member Qualifier (held on 15 February).

Gerwyn Price, James Wade, Dimitri Van den Bergh and Cameron Menzies withdrew and were replaced by Thibault Tricole, Patrick Geeraets, Matthew Dennant and Lukas Wenig. Joe Cullen, Gian van Veen and Daryl Gurney moved up to become the 14th, 15th and 16th seeds respectively.

The following players took part in the tournament:

Seeded Players

1. Jonny Clayton (second round)
2. Stephen Bunting (second round)
3. Damon Heta (quarter-finals)
4. Nathan Aspinall (second round)
5. Chris Dobey (quarter-finals)
6. Dave Chisnall (third round)
7. Peter Wright (third round)
8. Danny Noppert (third round)
9. Josh Rock (semi-finals)
10. Ross Smith (runner-up)
11. Ryan Searle (second round)
12. Mike De Decker (second round)
13. Martin Schindler (champion)
14. Joe Cullen (third round)
15. Gian van Veen (second round)
16. Daryl Gurney (quarter-finals)

Pro Tour Order of Merit Qualifiers
- Wessel Nijman (third round)
- Ritchie Edhouse (first round)
- Luke Woodhouse (second round)
- Raymond van Barneveld (first round)
- Jermaine Wattimena (third round)
- Andrew Gilding (first round)
- Ryan Joyce (semi-finals)
- Dirk van Duijvenbode (quarter-finals)
- Kevin Doets (third round)
- Madars Razma (first round)
- Krzysztof Ratajski (second round)
- Ricardo Pietreczko (second round)

Tour Card Qualifier
- Berry van Peer (first round)
- Karel Sedláček (second round)
- Nathan Rafferty (first round)
- Tom Bissell (first round)
- Ian White (second round)
- Niko Springer (second round)
- Mickey Mansell (first round)
- Chris Landman (second round)
- Matt Campbell (third round)
- William O'Connor (first round)

Host Nation Qualifier
- Zoran Lerchbacher (first round)
- Mensur Suljović (second round)
- Rowby-John Rodriguez (first round)
- Christian Gödl (first round)

Nordic & Baltic Qualifier
- Teemu Harju (first round)

East European Qualifier
- György Jehirszki (first round)

Reserve List
- Thibault Tricole (second round)
- Patrick Geeraets (first round)
- Matthew Dennant (second round)
- Lukas Wenig (first round)

== Draw ==
First round (best of 11 legs); 25 April
Jermaine Wattimena 92.02	6
Zoran Lerchbacher 72.87	0
Ritchie Edhouse 84.74	3
Mensur Suljović 92.13	6
Lukas Wenig 91.85	1
Niko Springer 96.25	6
Krzysztof Ratajski 92.02	6
Mickey Mansell 88.90	3
Kevin Doets 95.93	6
Berry van Peer 89.27	3
Matthew Dennant 88.87	6
Rowby-John Rodriguez 79.24	2
Ricardo Pietreczko 89.58	6
Tom Bissell 87.81	3
Wessel Nijman 95.83	6
William O'Connor 92.11	4
Patrick Geeraets 88.82	5
Matt Campbell 87.22	6
Dirk van Duijvenbode 106.18	6
György Jehirszki 76.81	1
Luke Woodhouse 86.08	6
Nathan Rafferty 85.20	5
Andrew Gilding 95.21	5
Chris Landman 90.93	6
Raymond van Barneveld 83.55	2
Karel Sedláček 92.16	6
Thibault Tricole 96.96	6
Christian Gödl 88.48	3
Madars Razma 97.52	5
Ian White 96.97	6
Ryan Joyce 92.77	6
Teemu Harju 90.57	4

Second round (best of 11 legs); 26 April
1	Jonny Clayton 96.69	3
Jermaine Wattimena 98.52	6
16	Daryl Gurney 100.13	6
Mensur Suljović 93.48	1
8	Danny Noppert 100.63	6
Niko Springer 94.44	5
9	Josh Rock 105.11	6
Krzysztof Ratajski 94.27	4
4	Nathan Aspinall 90.26	2
Kevin Doets 85.51	6
13	Martin Schindler 99.36	6
Matthew Dennant 96.50	3
5	Chris Dobey 105.09	6
Ricardo Pietreczko 84.06	1
12	Mike De Decker 102.13	4
Wessel Nijman 102.64	6
2	Stephen Bunting 104.54	4
Matt Campbell 102.42	6
15	Gian van Veen 94.25	1
Dirk van Duijvenbode 108.66	6
7	Peter Wright 89.37	6
Luke Woodhouse 81.79	3
10	Ross Smith 100.44	6
Chris Landman 83.05	1
3	Damon Heta 94.27	6
Karel Sedláček 93.66	5
14	Joe Cullen 77.13	6
Thibault Tricole 70.23	2
6	Dave Chisnall 94.14	6
Ian White 91.71	3
11	Ryan Searle 92.11	1
Ryan Joyce 102.03	6

Third round (best of 11 legs); 27 April
Wattimena 92.65	1
16	Gurney 96.19	6
8	Noppert 92.20	5
9	Rock 100.81	6
Doets 94.01	5
13	Schindler 98.41	6
5	Dobey 98.09	6
Nijman 89.40	1
Campbell 97.28	4
van Duijvenbode 102.63	6
7	Wright 93.28	5
10	Smith 93.96	6
3	Heta 100.20	6
14	Cullen 89.05	5
6	Chisnall 96.64	3
Joyce 95.53	6

Quarter-finals (best of 11 legs); 27 April
16	Gurney 89.27	3
9	Rock 95.98	6
13	Schindler 107.78	6
5	Dobey 106.50	4
van Duijvenbode 101.89	4
10	Smith 92.26	6
3	Heta 90.58	1
Joyce 97.59	6

Semi-finals (best of 13 legs); 27 April
9	Rock 87.53	6
13	Schindler 90.54	7
10	Smith 91.93	7
Joyce 87.13	4

Final (best of 15 legs); 27 April
13	Schindler 93.66	8
10	Smith 91.36	4
