= Danny van Trijp =

Dutch darts player (born 1996)

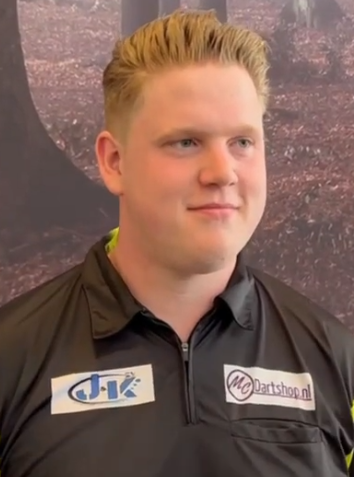
- Van Trijp in 2022

Personal information
- Born: 24 December 1996 (age 29) Etten-Leur, Netherlands

Sport
- Sport: Darts
- Playing since: 2016
- Darts: 24g Harrows
- Laterality: Right-handed
- Walk-on music: "Unity" by Dimitri Vegas & Like Mike ft. Hardwell

Organisation (see split in darts)
- BDO: 2017–2019
- PDC: 2018–present (Tour Card: 2023–2024)
- Current world ranking: (PDC) 222 ▼2 (18 October 2026)

PDC premier events – best performances
- World Championship: Last 64: 2023
- UK Open: Last 128: 2020

Other tournament wins
- Years
PDC Challenge Tour	2022 (x2), 2025
ADC Lowlands Spring Series Finals	2025
Medal record
Men's Darts
Representing Netherlands
WDF World Cup
Silver medal – second place	2025 Seoul	Men's pairs
WDF Europe Cup
Silver medal – second place	2022 Gandía	Men's team
Silver medal – second place	2022 Gandía	Men's overall
Bronze medal – third place	2022 Gandía	Men's singles

Danny van Trijp (born 24 December 1996) is a Dutch darts player who competes in Professional Darts Corporation (PDC) events. He has won three titles on the PDC Challenge Tour and made his PDC World Darts Championship debut at the 2023 event.

== Career ==
Van Trijp attended European Q-School in 2019, but never got farther than the last 16, missing out on a PDC Tour Card. He did then qualify as one of the Associate Member qualifiers for the 2019 European Darts Open in Leverkusen, Germany. However, he lost 6–3 to Adam Hunt in the first round. He also qualified for the 2019 Dutch Darts Masters. In the first round he won 6–5 against Keegan Brown, but was defeated 6–2 by Ricky Evans in the second round. Van Trijp made his Players Championship debut on 3 August 2019. He lost in the first round to David Pallett 6–5. A day later he won 6–3 against Simon Stevenson, then lost in the second round against Steve Beaton 6–5.

Van Trijp made his UK Open debut in 2020. In the first round he defeated Boris Koltsov 6–4 but was then beaten 6–0 by William Borland in the next round.

At the 2022 WDF Europe Cup, he lost the final with the Dutch team against England 9–8 and was eliminated in the men's singles semi-final against Finland's Teemu Harju with a 6–1 defeat.

Van Trijp won his first two PDC Challenge Tour titles during the 2022 series. He was the runner-up in event eight but won the title in event nine, defeating Lukas Wenig 5–2 in the final. He won his second title in event eleven with a 5–2 win over Jelle Klaasen in the final.

Van Trijp made his World Championship debut at the 2023 PDC World Darts Championship when he secured his spot via the 2022 PDC Challenge Tour Order of Merit. He defeated Steve Beaton in the first round 3–0 before losing 3–0 against Jonny Clayton in the second round.

Van Trijp secured his Tour Card for the 2023 and 2024 seasons via the PDC Challenge Tour. At Players Championship 17 in 2023 he made it to his first semi-final on the PDC Pro Tour, but lost 7–1 to Josh Rock. However, he was unable to qualify for any European Tour events or other major tournaments during the two seasons.

In August 2025, van Trijp beat Dean Finn to win MODUS Super Series Series 11 Week 12, hitting a 9 darter and averaging 120.24 in the final.

== Personal life ==
Van Trijp has a twin brother, Wesley, who is also a darts player. They are from Etten-Leur, North Brabant, Netherlands.

== World Championship results ==
=== PDC ===
- 2023: Second round (lost to Jonny Clayton 0–3)

== Performance timeline ==
Tournament	2018	2019	2020	2021	2022	2023	2024	2025
PDC Ranked televised events
World Championship	DNQ					2R	DNQ	
UK Open	DNQ		2R	DNQ		1R	2R	2R
PDC Non-ranked televised events
World Youth Championship	RR	RR	RR	DNP				
Career statistics
Season-end ranking	–	169	–	–	93	142	104	

=== PDC European Tour ===
Tournament	2019	2022
European Darts Open	1R	DNQ
Dutch Darts Masters	2R	DNQ
International Darts Open	DNQ	1R

=== PDC Players Championships ===
Season	1	2	3	4	5	6	7	8	9	10	11	12	13	14	15	16	17	18	19	20	21	22	23	24	25	26	27	28	29	30	31	32	33	34
2019 (Note: Not a Tour card holder)	Did not participate																				HIL; 1R	HIL; 2R	Did not participate											
2022	Did not participate													WIG; 2R	WIG; 1R	NIE; 1R	NIE; 2R	BAR; 3R	BAR; 2R	BAR; 2R	BAR; 1R	BAR; 1R	BAR; 1R	BAR; 1R	BAR; 1R	BAR; 3R	BAR; 4R	BAR; 1R	BAR; DNP					
2023	BAR; 1R	BAR; 2R	BAR; 1R	BAR; 1R	BAR; 4R	BAR; 1R	HIL; 1R	HIL; 1R	WIG; 1R	WIG; 1R	LEI; 1R	LEI; 1R	HIL; 1R	HIL; 1R	LEI; 1R	LEI; 1R	HIL; SF	HIL; 1R	BAR; 3R	BAR; 2R	BAR; 1R	BAR; 1R	BAR; 1R	BAR; 1R	BAR; 1R	BAR; 1R	BAR; 2R	BAR; 1R	BAR; 1R	BAR; 1R				
2024	WIG; 1R	WIG; 1R	LEI; 1R	LEI; 2R	HIL; 1R	HIL; 1R	LEI; 1R	LEI; 4R	HIL; 1R	HIL; 1R	HIL; 1R	HIL; 1R	MIL; 2R	MIL; 1R	MIL; 1R	MIL; 4R	MIL; 1R	MIL; 2R	MIL; 2R	WIG; 1R	WIG; 1R	LEI; 2R	LEI; 1R	WIG; 1R	WIG; 1R	WIG; 1R	WIG; 1R	WIG; 1R	LEI; 1R	LEI; 1R				
2025	Did not participate						HIL; 4R	HIL; 1R	Did not participate						HIL; 2R	HIL; 1R	LEI; 1R	LEI; 1R	LEI; 1R	LEI; DNP		HIL; 2R	HIL; 2R	MIL; DNP		HIL; 3R	HIL; 2R	LEI; DNP			WIG; 1R	WIG; 2R	WIG; DNP	

Performance Table Legend
W	Won the tournament	F	Finalist	SF	Semifinalist	QF	Quarterfinalist	#R; RR; Prel.	Lost in # round Round-robin; Preliminary round	DQ	Disqualified
DNQ	Did not qualify	DNP	Did not participate	WD	Withdrew	NH	Tournament not held	#R; RR; Prel.	Lost in # round Round-robin; Preliminary round	NYF	Not yet founded
