= Teemu Harju =

Finnish darts player

Personal information
- Born: 25 May 1992 (age 34) Teuva, Finland
- Home town: Harjavalta, Finland

Sport
- Sport: Darts
- Playing since: 2007
- Darts: 21g Bull's NL Signature
- Laterality: Right-handed
- Walk-on music: "Country Roads" by Hermes House Band

Organisation (see split in darts)
- BDO: 2007–2010; 2013–2020
- PDC: 2011–2013; 2023–present
- WDF: 2007–2010; 2013–present
- Current world ranking: (PDC) 172 ▼2 (18 October 2026)

WDF major events – best performances
- World Masters: Last 256: 2013

Other tournament wins
- Years
PDCNB Finland	2025
PDCNB Norway	2025
PDCNB Championship	2025
Medal record
Men's Darts
Representing Finland
WDF Europe Cup
Silver medal – second place	2022 Gandía	Men's singles

Teemu Harju (born 25 May 1992) is Finnish professional darts player who competes in both Professional Darts Corporation (PDC) and World Darts Federation (WDF) events. He is the reigning PDC Nordic & Baltic champion.

He won a silver medal representing Finland at the 2022 WDF Europe Cup Men's singles.

== Career ==
Harju was a prospective player. He took part in the PDC World Youth Championship three times as a qualifier from Scandinavia. His best result was at the 2012 PDC World Youth Championship, where he defeated Ryan Harrington in the first round match by 5–1 in legs. In the second round he lost to Rhys Dudley by 3–5 in legs.

At the end of September 2022, he was selected by the national federation to participate in the 2022 WDF Europe Cup. On the third day of the tournament, he advanced to the finals of the singles competition, defeating Nick Kenny, Jan McIntosh and Danny van Trijp on the road to the final. In the final, he lost to Jacques Labre by 2–7 in legs and becoming the first singles medalist from Finland since Ulf Ceder in 2012. In the team competition, advanced with his team to the quarter-finals, where they lost to the team from Netherlands. In the pair competition, he was eliminated in the first phase.

== World Championship results ==
=== PDC ===
- 2026: First round (lost to Alan Soutar 2–3)

== Performance timeline ==
=== BDO ===
Tournament	2013
BDO Ranked televised events
World Masters	1R

=== PDC ===
Tournament	2011	2012	2013	2024	2025	2026
PDC Ranked televised events
World Championship	Did not qualify					1R
PDC Non-ranked televised events
World Cup	NH	DNP		RR	RR	DNQ
World Youth Championship	1R	2R	1R	Did not participate		

==== European Tour ====
Tournament	2024	2025	2026
Dutch Championship	1R	DNQ	
Austrian Open	DNQ	1R	DNQ
Baltic Sea Open	DNQ		1R

==== Nordic & Baltic Tour ====
Season	1	2	3	4	5	6	7	8	9	10	11	12
2024	QF	QF	L16	L32	L64	L16	QF	L16	QF	F		
2025	L32	F	L16	QF	SF	QF	W	QF	QF	L32	QF	W
2026	L64	QF	L32	L16	L16	L16	L32	L32	F	L16	F	L16

Performance Table Legend
W	Won the tournament	F	Finalist	SF	Semifinalist	QF	Quarterfinalist	#R; RR; Prel.	Lost in # round Round-robin; Preliminary round	DQ	Disqualified
DNQ	Did not qualify	DNP	Did not participate	WD	Withdrew	NH	Tournament not held	#R; RR; Prel.	Lost in # round Round-robin; Preliminary round	NYF	Not yet founded
