= Jacques Labre =

French darts player

Personal information
- Full name: Jacques Labre
- Nickname: "Biko"
- Born: 6 November 1982 (age 43) Paris, France
- Home town: Montreuil, France

Sport
- Sport: Darts
- Playing since: 2001
- Darts: 21g Cosmo Darts
- Laterality: Right-handed
- Walk-on music: "Stargazing" by Kygo

Organisation (see split in darts)
- BDO: 2010–2020
- PDC: 2023–present Tour Card 2023–2024)
- WDF: 2010–2022

WDF major events – best performances
- World Masters: Last 16: 2022

PDC premier events – best performances
- UK Open: Last 96: 2024

Other tournament wins
- Years
| Dartslive France Ch'ship | 2017 |
| PDC Challenge Tour | 2022 |
| Spanish Open | 2022 |
Medal record
Men's Darts
Representing France
WDF Europe Cup
| Gold medal – first place | 2022 Gandía | Men's singles |

Jacques Labre (born 6 November 1982) is a French professional steel-tip and soft-tip darts player who currently plays in Professional Darts Corporation (PDC) events. He was the first French player to gain a PDC Tour Card and become professional. He is a WDF Europe Cup champion and a first medalist of this tournament from France. He is also a Spanish Open Champion. He has represented his nation during the PDC World Cup of Darts, WDF World Cup and WDF Europe Cup.

== Career ==
Labre starts own international career in 2010 at the Mediterranean Cup where he advanced to Last 32 phase. In this year, he was advanced to the same phase in the French Open tournament. In the following years, he only played in international soft-tip tournaments and returning in 2014 as a French debut representative at the 2014 PDC World Cup of Darts together with Lionel Maranhao. They lost first round match against Richie Burnett and Mark Webster from Wales in the decider leg. In the same year, he tried his luck in qualifying for one of the PDC European Tour tournaments, but lost.

In 2015, he make his first appearance at the 2015 Winmau World Masters, but lost in the first round match against Ted Evetts by 0–3 in legs.

In 2016, he was also eliminated in the first round of international tournaments, such as the WDF Europe Cup and the World Masters. In 2017, he reached the fourth round at the 2017 Winmau World Masters and two years later he lost in the third round to eventual winner John O'Shea. Apart from that, the career in the national team progressed rather slowly. He played for France in these events until 2019, although he rarely made it past the first round. A positive development could be seen in 2022. After attending Q-School, Labre played on the Challenge Tour, where he made it to the quarter-finals once. High position in the PDC Challenge Tour ranking place him as substitute in the Players Championship competition, where he beat Ross Montgomery in his first match at this stage.

At the end of September 2022, he was selected by the national federation to participate in the 2022 WDF Europe Cup. On the third day of the tournament, he advanced to the finals of the singles competition, defeating Vegar Elvevoll, Alexander Mašek and Andy Baetens on the road to the final. In the final, he beat Teemu Harju by 7–2 in legs and becoming the first medalist from France. In the pairs and team competition, he did not make it to the final phase.

At the start of October 2022, he played at the inaugural Spanish Open tournament. In the final match, he beat Vítězslav Sedlák by 6–1 in legs, becoming the first Champion.

In January 2023, he took part in the PDC Q-School qualifying tournament. After tournament finals, by the points in classification, he obtained a PDC Tour Card for the next two years.

== Performance timeline ==
=== BDO ===
| Tournament | 2015 | 2016 | 2017 | 2018 | 2019 |
|---|---|---|---|---|---|
BDO Ranked televised events
| World Masters | 1R | Prel. | 4R | 2R | 3R |

=== WDF ===
| Tournament | 2022 |
|---|---|
WDF Ranked televised events
| World Masters | 5R |

=== PDC ===
| Tournament | 2014 | 2023 | 2024 | 2025 |
|---|---|---|---|---|
PDC Ranked televised events
| UK Open | DNQ | 1R | 3R | DNQ |
PDC Non-ranked televised events
| World Cup | 1R | QF | 2R | RR |

==== Players Championships ====
| Season | 1 | 2 | 3 | 4 | 5 | 6 | 7 | 8 | 9 | 10 | 11 | 12 | 13 | 14 | 15 | 16 | 17 | 18 | 19 | 20 | 21 | 22 | 23 | 24 | 25 | 26 | 27 | 28 | 29 | 30 |
|---|---|---|---|---|---|---|---|---|---|---|---|---|---|---|---|---|---|---|---|---|---|---|---|---|---|---|---|---|---|---|
| 2022 | Did not participate | | | | | | | NIE; 2R | Did not participate | | | | | | | | | | | | | | | | | | | | BAR; 1R | BAR; 1R |
| 2023 | BAR; 1R | BAR; 1R | BAR; 1R | BAR; 1R | BAR; 1R | BAR; 4R | HIL; 1R | HIL; 1R | WIG; 1R | WIG; 1R | LEI; 1R | LEI; 1R | HIL; DNP | | LEI; 2R | LEI; 1R | HIL; 1R | HIL; 1R | BAR; 3R | BAR; 1R | BAR; 1R | BAR; 1R | BAR; 1R | BAR; 1R | BAR; 2R | BAR; 1R | BAR; 1R | BAR; 1R | BAR; 1R | BAR; 1R |
| 2024 | WIG; 1R | WIG; 1R | LEI; 1R | LEI; 1R | HIL; 1R | HIL; 1R | LEI; 1R | LEI; 1R | Did not participate | | | | | | | | | | | WIG; 2R | WIG; 1R | Did not participate | | | | | WIG; 1R | WIG; 1R | LEI; 2R | LEI; 1R |
