= Scott Williams (darts player) =

English darts player (born 1990)

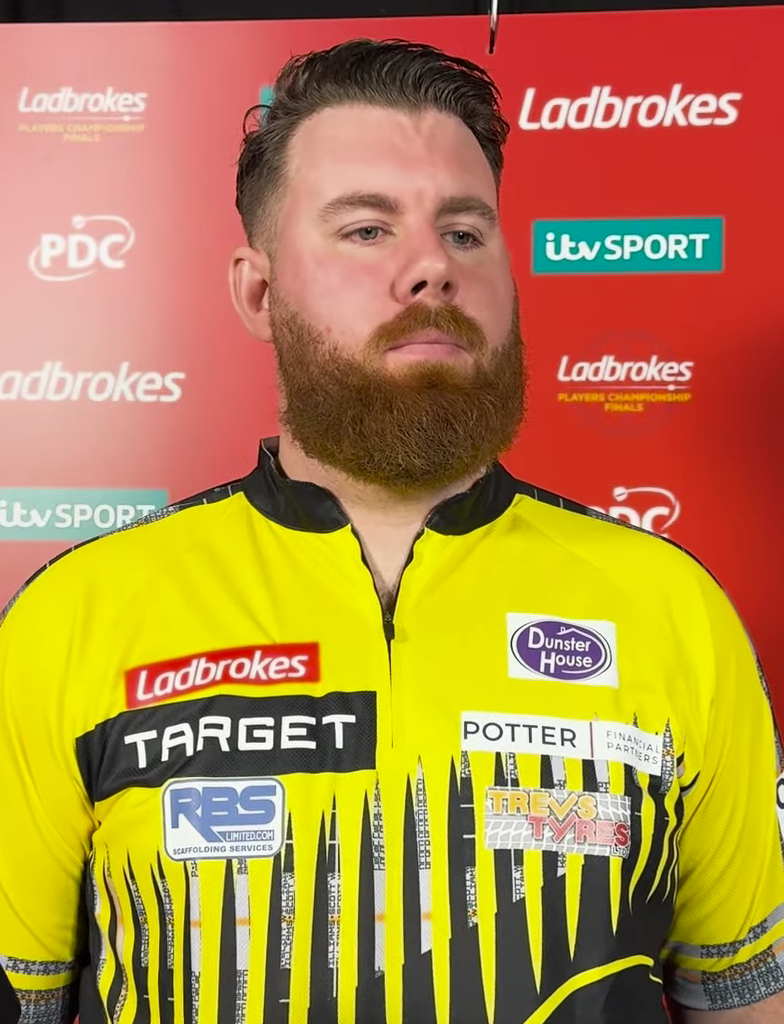
- Williams at the 2024 Players Championship Finals

Personal information
- Nickname: "Shaggy"
- Born: 18 January 1990 (age 36)
- Home town: Boston, Lincolnshire, England

Sport
- Sport: Darts
- Playing since: 2018
- Darts: Target Prototype
- Laterality: Right-handed
- Walk-on music: "Golden" by Huntrix "Metalingus" by Alter Bridge

Organisation (see split in darts)
- BDO: 2019–2020
- PDC: 2022–present (Tour Card: 2023–present)
- WDF: 2019–2022
- Current world ranking: (PDC) 44 ▲3 (29 October 2026)

WDF major events – best performances
- World Championship: Last 40: 2020

PDC premier events – best performances
- World Championship: Semi-final: 2024
- UK Open: Last 64: 2024
- Grand Slam: Group Stage: 2022
- PC Finals: Quarter-final: 2024

Other tournament wins
- Years
PDC Challenge Tour	2022 (x4)
Players Championships
2022 Players Championship 17
Medal record
Men's Darts
Representing England
WDF Europe Cup
Gold medal – first place	2022 Gandía	Men's pairs
Gold medal – first place	2022 Gandía	Men's team
Gold medal – first place	2022 Gandía	Men's overall

Scott Williams (born 18 January 1990) is an English professional darts player who competes in Professional Darts Corporation (PDC) events. He won his first ranking title at 2022 Players Championship 17, becoming the third player to win a PDC ranking event without being a PDC Tour Card holder. Williams topped the 2022 Challenge Tour Order of Merit, winning four titles. A Tour Card holder since 2023, he made his first major semi-final by reaching the last four at the 2024 PDC World Championship. He reached his second major quarter-final at the 2024 Players Championship Finals.

== Career ==
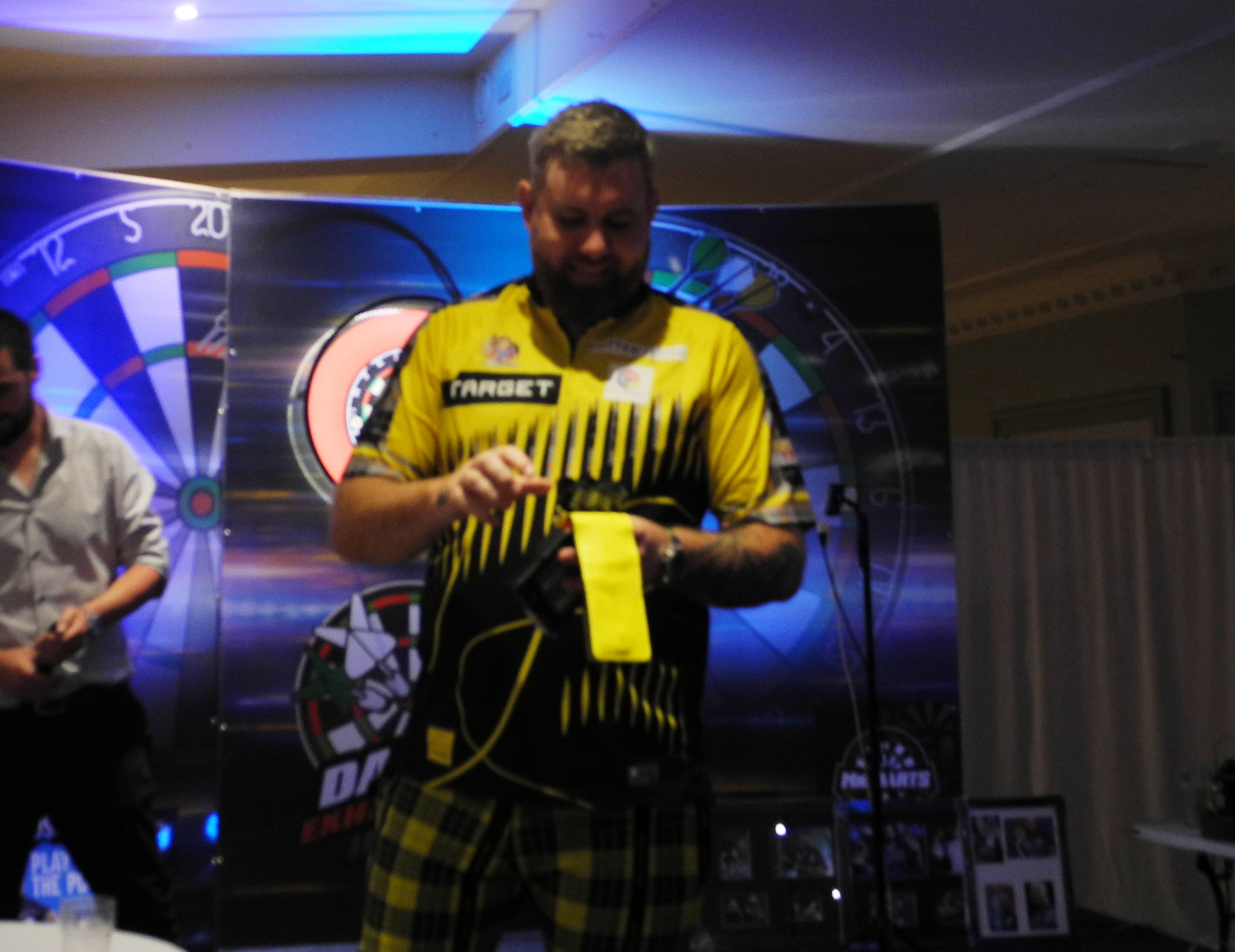
Williams in 2025

Williams qualified for the 2020 BDO World Darts Championship as one of the Playoff qualifiers. He defeated Wes Newton and Andrew Kateley to secure his place in the tournament. He was whitewashed 3–0 by Justin Thompson in the preliminary round.

In 2022, Williams won his first PDC Challenge Tour title at Challenge Tour 1 in Milton Keynes. On his way to the final, Williams defeated Conor Heneghan in the last 64, Jimmy Bristow 5–1 in the last 32, Darryl Pilgrim 5–2 in the round of 16, Darren Johnson 5–3 in the quarter-finals and Danny Lauby Jr. 5–1 in the semi-finals. He defeated Robert Owen in the final 5–2. Later the same day, Williams won his second Challenge Tour title at Challenge Tour 2. Williams won 5–2 against Lee Evans in the final.

On the 2022 PDC Pro Tour, Williams received call–ups for 2022 PDC Players Championship series events filling in as a reserve for an absent tour card holder virtue of his ranking on the Challenge Tour Order of Merit. Williams won Players Championship 17 in June, beating Nathan Aspinall 8–5 in the final. This meant he became the third player, after Joe Murnan and Krzysztof Ratajski, to win a Players Championship event without being a PDC Tour Card holder.

At the end of September 2022, he was selected by the national federation to participate in the 2022 WDF Europe Cup. On the second day of the tournament, he advanced to the finals of the pairs competition where he played together with Joshua Richardson. On the way to the final, they defeated rivals from Wales, Romania and Czech Republic. Finally, on 1 October, they beat Polish duo Sebastian Białecki and Dariusz Marciniak 6–2 in legs. He also won a gold medal in the men's team event, as well as contributing to England's overall gold medal.

Williams finished 2022 with four Challenge Tour titles. He topped the 2022 Challenge Tour Order of Merit, securing qualification for the 2022 Grand Slam of Darts, his debut at the tournament. He also secured a debut at the 2023 PDC World Darts Championship, but was already qualified via the Pro Tour Order of Merit. At the Grand Slam, he finished third in his group and was eliminated. At the World Championship, he won his opening match against Ryan Joyce 3–1 with an average of 100.32. In the match, Williams and Joyce broke the record for number of 180s hit in a first-round World Championship match, with 17 between them. Williams lost to Rob Cross 3–1 in the second round.

Williams played his first year as a PDC Tour Card holder in 2023. He reached the semi-finals of the 2023 Hungarian Darts Trophy, missing out on the final by losing to eventual champion Dave Chisnall 7–5.

At the 2024 PDC World Championship, Williams beat Haruki Muramatsu 3–1 in the first round before eliminating seventh seed Danny Noppert in the second round, defeating Noppert 3–0. Williams caused controversy following his next win over Martin Schindler, joking about England winning "two World Wars and one World Cup" after his victory against his German opponent. Sky Sports apologised for Williams' remarks on the air and Williams later apologised himself, calling the comment 'stupid'. In the quarter-finals, Williams faced three-time World Champion Michael van Gerwen. Williams managed a surprise win over van Gerwen, defeating him 5–3 to progress to his first major semi-final. Williams' run came to an end when he was whitewashed 6–0 by eventual champion Luke Humphries.

Williams found form again at the 2024 Players Championship Finals, earning victories over Gian van Veen, Kim Huybrechts and Jeffrey de Graaf to reach the quarter-finals, where he lost to Ross Smith 10–3. At the 2025 PDC World Darts Championship, Williams defeated Niko Springer 3–1 in the first round. He played Rob Cross in a rematch of their 2023 meeting, but this time Williams beat the former World Champion 3–1. Williams lost to Ricardo Pietreczko 4–1 in the third round.

== World Championship results ==
=== BDO ===
- 2020: Preliminary round (lost to Justin Thompson 0–3)

=== PDC ===
- 2023: Second round (lost to Rob Cross 1–3)
- 2024: Semi-finals (lost to Luke Humphries 0–6)
- 2025: Third round (lost to Ricardo Pietreczko 1–4)
- 2026: Second round (lost to Jermaine Wattimena 2–3)

== Performance timeline ==
=== BDO ===
Tournament	2019	2020
BDO Ranked televised events
BDO World Championship	DNP	Prel.
World Masters	2R	NH

=== PDC ===
Tournament	2022	2023	2024	2025	2026
PDC Ranked televised events
PDC World Championship	DNQ	2R	SF	3R	2R
PDC World Masters	Did not qualify			Prel.	Prel.
UK Open	DNQ	3R	4R	4R	3R
Grand Slam of Darts	RR	DNQ			
Players Championship Finals	3R	1R	QF	2R	
Career statistics
Season-end ranking (PDC)	57	30	36	44	

==== PDC European Tour ====
Season	1	2	3	4	5	6	7	8	9	10	11	12	13	14	15
2022	Did not qualify				EDO; 3R	DNQ			EDM; 3R	HDT; DNQ	GDO; 1R	DNQ			
2023	DNQ		IDO; 1R	Did not qualify								HDT; SF	GDC; DNQ		
2024	DNQ			EDG; 3R	Did not qualify					FDT; 2R	HDT; 3R	DNQ			
2025	DNQ			GDG; 2R	Did not qualify										
2026	DNQ		BDO; 1R	Did not qualify											DDC; 2R

==== PDC Players Championships ====
Season	1	2	3	4	5	6	7	8	9	10	11	12	13	14	15	16	17	18	19	20	21	22	23	24	25	26	27	28	29	30	31	32	33	34
2021 (Note: Not a Tour card holder)	Did not participate								NIE; 1R	NIE; 2R	NIE; 1R	NIE; 1R	MIL; DNP			MIL; 1R	Did not participate													BAR; 2R				
2022	BAR; 4R	BAR; 2R	WIG; 4R	WIG; 1R	BAR; 3R	BAR; 4R	NIE; QF	NIE; 1R	BAR; DNP			BAR; 2R	BAR; 2R	WIG; 1R	WIG; 2R	NIE; 1R	NIE; W	BAR; 2R	BAR; 1R	BAR; 2R	BAR; 1R	BAR; 2R	BAR; 3R	BAR; 1R	BAR; 2R	BAR; 2R	BAR; 1R	BAR; 2R	BAR; 2R	BAR; 3R				
2023	BAR; 1R	BAR; 1R	BAR; 3R	BAR; 1R	BAR; 1R	BAR; 3R	HIL; 1R	HIL; 3R	WIG; 2R	WIG; 1R	LEI; 4R	LEI; 4R	HIL; 3R	HIL; 2R	LEI; 3R	LEI; 2R	HIL; 1R	HIL; 1R	BAR; 1R	BAR; 3R	BAR; 1R	BAR; 3R	BAR; 2R	BAR; 1R	BAR; 1R	BAR; 2R	BAR; 1R	BAR; 3R	BAR; 1R	BAR; 2R				
2024	WIG; 1R	WIG; 2R	LEI; 1R	LEI; QF	HIL; 3R	HIL; 1R	LEI; 2R	LEI; 1R	HIL; 4R	HIL; QF	HIL; 4R	HIL; 1R	MIL; 1R	MIL; 3R	MIL; 3R	MIL; 1R	MIL; 3R	MIL; 4R	MIL; 1R	WIG; 3R	WIG; 2R	MIL; 2R	MIL; 2R	WIG; 1R	WIG; 2R	WIG; 2R	WIG; 2R	WIG; 1R	LEI; 1R	LEI; 1R				
2025	WIG; 2R	WIG; 2R	ROS; 2R	ROS; 2R	LEI; 4R	LEI; 1R	HIL; 2R	HIL; 2R	LEI; 2R	LEI; SF	LEI; 1R	LEI; 1R	ROS; 2R	ROS; DNP	HIL; SF	HIL; 2R	LEI; 1R	LEI; 1R	LEI; F	LEI; 1R	LEI; 2R	HIL; 1R	HIL; 3R	MIL; SF	MIL; 3R	HIL; 1R	HIL; SF	LEI; 1R	LEI; 2R	LEI; 2R	WIG; 1R	WIG; DNP	WIG; 1R	WIG; 2R
2026	HIL; 2R	HIL; 2R	WIG; 1R	WIG; 2R	LEI; 2R	LEI; 1R	LEI; 1R	LEI; 1R	WIG; 2R	WIG; 4R	MIL; 1R	MIL; 1R	HIL; 1R	HIL; 1R	LEI; DNP		LEI; 1R	LEI; 1R	MIL; 1R	MIL; 2R	WIG; 1R	WIG; 2R	LEI; 1R	LEI; 4R	HIL; 1R	HIL; 2R	LEI; 1R	LEI; 2R	ROS; 3R	ROS; F	ROS; 1R	ROS; SF	LEI; 1R	LEI; 2R

Performance Table Legend
W	Won the tournament	F	Finalist	SF	Semifinalist	QF	Quarterfinalist	#R; RR; Prel.	Lost in # round Round-robin; Preliminary round	DQ	Disqualified
DNQ	Did not qualify	DNP	Did not participate	WD	Withdrew	NH	Tournament not held	#R; RR; Prel.	Lost in # round Round-robin; Preliminary round	NYF	Not yet founded
