= Matthew Dennant =

Personal information
- Nickname: "The Scholar"
- Born: 25 June 1991 (age 35) Walsall, England
- Home town: Bloxwich, Walsall, England

Sport
- Sport: Darts
- Playing since: 2008
- Darts: 25g Unicorn
- Laterality: Right-handed
- Walk-on music: "Red Right Hand by The Arctic Monkeys"

Organisation (see split in darts)
- PDC: 2012–present (Tour Card: 2016–2017; 2024–2025)

PDC premier events – best performances
- World Championship: Last 128: 2026
- UK Open: Last 64: 2013, 2017

Matthew Dennant (born 25 June 1991) is an English professional darts player who competes in Professional Darts Corporation (PDC) events. Nicknamed "the Scholar", Dennant won a two-year PDC Tour Card at UK Qualifying School in both 2016 and 2024. He has won three titles in the PDC secondary tours.

== Career ==
=== 2012–2013: First secondary tour title ===
Matthew Dennant reached a final on the PDC Development Tour for the first time in 2012. A year later he made his debut at the 2013 UK Open. After two wins he was eliminated in the third round by Adrian Lewis. Dennant won event seventeen on the 2013 Challenge Tour, defeating Max Hopp in the final.

=== 2016–2017: First stint as a Tour Card holder ===
At the beginning of 2016, Dennant was able to win a PDC Tour Card for the first time through the PDC Qualifying School. In 2016 PDC Players Championship series events, Dennant was able to reach the third round (last 32) stage on two occasions. At the 2016 European Darts Trophy he made his PDC European Tour debut. He lost to Devon Petersen 6–5 in the first round. By reaching the last 16 at 2017 UK Open Qualifier 1, Dennant qualified for the UK Open for the second time. At the 2017 edition, he started in the second round where he beat Zoran Lerchbacher before losing to Benito van de Pas in the third round. Due to poor results in 2017 on the PDC Pro Tour– not reaching a last 32 in a 2017 Players Championship event and only one making one European Tour appearance at the Gibraltar Darts Trophy– Dennant was not able to reach the top 64 of the Order of Merit at the end of 2017 and therefore he lost his Tour Card.

=== 2018–2021: Two Challenge Tour titles and Euro Tour appearances ===
After losing his Tour Card, Dennant made appearances on the 2018 PDC Challenge Tour and qualified for the 2018 International Darts Open but lost his first round game for the third time on the European Tour. He qualified for the 2019 UK Open via his ranking on the 2018 PDC Challenge Tour but lost in the first round to amateur player Kevin Thoburn. At the opening European Tour event of the 2019 PDC Pro Tour, the 2019 European Darts Open, Dennant was able to defeat Madars Razma to win a match on the European Tour for the first time. He then lost to Mensur Suljović 6–4 in the second round. On the 2020 Challenge Tour, he won the third event by defeating Nathan Rafferty 6–4 in the final. The following year, he took part in the 2021 UK Open but lost in the first round. In September, he won his third PDC secondary tours title at UK Challenge Tour 8.

=== 2024–2025: Second stint as a Tour Card holder ===
In 2024, Dennant won a PDC Tour Card for the second time at PDC Qualifying School by topping the UK Q-School Order of Merit. Dennant lost in the last 96 stage of the 2024 UK Open. He qualified for two events on the 2024 PDC European Tour– the 2024 Baltic Sea Darts Open and 2024 European Darts Open– as a Tour Card holder qualifier. However, he lost to Moritz Hilger and Karel Sedláček respectively in the first round. In August, Dennant reached the fourth round (last 16) of Players Championship 19. On the 2025 PDC Pro Tour, Dennant qualified for the Belgian Darts Open and missed match darts in a deciding leg loss to Ricardo Pietreczko 6–5. In March, Dennant lost in the last 96 at the 2025 UK Open. He reached the last 16 at Players Championship 10 before reaching his first two Pro Tour quarter-finals at events 11 and 22. At the Austrian Darts Open and 2025 Hungarian Darts Trophy, he reached the second round on the European Tour for the second and third time on the European Tour by defeating Rowby-John Rodriguez in the former and Andrew Gilding in the latter. He then lost to Martin Schindler and Michael van Gerwen in the respective second round matches.

Despite qualifying for his debut at the PDC World Darts Championship at the 2026 edition via the 2025 PDC Pro Tour, Dennant lost his Tour Card following a lost to Kevin Doets 3–1 in the first round.

== Performance timeline ==
Matthew Dennant's performance timeline is as follows:

Tournament	2013	2017	2019	2021	2024	2025	2026
PDC Ranked televised events
World Championship	Did not qualify						1R
World Masters (Note: A non-ranked event until 2025)	Did not qualify					Prel.	DNQ
UK Open	3R	3R	1R	1R	3R	3R	

PDC Players Championships

Season	1	2	3	4	5	6	7	8	9	10	11	12	13	14	15	16	17	18	19	20	21	22	23	24	25	26	27	28	29	30	31	32	33	34
2013	Did not participate												WIG; 1R	WIG; 2R	BAR; DNP																			
2016	BAR; 1R	BAR; 1R	BAR; 1R	BAR; 3R	BAR; 1R	BAR; 1R	BAR; 1R	COV; 3R	COV; 1R	BAR; 1R	BAR; 1R	BAR; 2R	BAR; 1R	BAR; 1R	BAR; 1R	BAR; 1R	DUB; 2R	DUB; 1R	BAR; 1R	BAR; 1R														
2017	BAR; 2R	BAR; 2R	BAR; 1R	BAR; 1R	MIL; 2R	MIL; 1R	BAR; 1R	BAR; 2R	WIG; 1R	WIG; 1R	MIL; 1R	MIL; 1R	WIG; 1R	WIG; 1R	BAR; 2R	BAR; 1R	BAR; 2R	BAR; 1R	DUB; 1R	DUB; 1R	BAR; 2R	BAR; 1R												
2018	Did not participate																	BAR; 1R	Did not participate															
2019	Did not participate																												BAR; 1R	BAR; 1R				
2020	BAR; DNP		WIG; 2R	WIG; 1R	WIG; 1R	WIG; 1R	BAR; DNP		MIL; 2R	MIL; 2R	MIL; 1R	MIL; 1R	MIL; 2R	NIE; Did not participate					COV; 1R	COV; 2R	COV; 2R	COV; 3R	COV; 1R											
2023	Did not participate											LEI; 1R	Did not participate																					
2024	WIG; 2R	WIG; 1R	LEI; 2R	LEI; 2R	HIL; 1R	HIL; 2R	LEI; 1R	LEI; 1R	HIL; 1R	HIL; 1R	HIL; 1R	HIL; 1R	MIL; 1R	MIL; 2R	MIL; 1R	MIL; 1R	MIL; 1R	MIL; 3R	MIL; 4R	WIG; 2R	WIG; 1R	LEI; 1R	LEI; 2R	WIG; 3R	WIG; 1R	WIG; 2R	WIG; 1R	WIG; 3R	LEI; 1R	LEI; 1R				
2025	WIG; DNP	WIG; 1R	ROS; 1R	ROS; 2R	LEI; 3R	LEI; 1R	HIL; 2R	HIL; 2R	LEI; 1R	LEI; 4R	LEI; QF	LEI; 3R	ROS; 1R	ROS; 1R	HIL; 2R	HIL; 1R	LEI; 1R	LEI; 1R	LEI; 2R	LEI; 2R	LEI; 1R	HIL; QF	HIL; 1R	MIL; 2R	MIL; 3R	HIL; 1R	HIL; 2R	LEI; 2R	LEI; 1R	LEI; 1R	WIG; 1R	WIG; 3R	WIG; 3R	WIG; 2R

PDC Challenge Tour

Season	1	2	3	4	5	6	7	8	9	10	11	12	13	14	15	16	17	18	19	20	21	22	23	24
2019	L16	L64	L64	L128	L128	L128	L128	L16	L64	L32	L256	L256	L32	L128	L64	L64	L256	SF	L16					
2020	L512	L64	W	L64	SF	L16	L32	QF	L128	L32														
2021	QF	L256	L128	L128	L128	L16	L256	W	L64	L256	L256	L128												
2022	L256	L128	L256	L16	L64											QF	L16	L32	L16	L64	L256	L64	F	L64
2023	L64	L64	L32	L64	L128					L256	L64	SF	L32	L256	L64	L64	L16	L16						
2026	L128	L16	L512	L256	L256																			

Key

Performance Table Legend
W	Won the tournament	F	Finalist	SF	Semifinalist	QF	Quarterfinalist	#R; RR; L#	Lost in # round Round-robin; Last # stage	DQ	Disqualified
DNQ	Did not qualify	DNP	Did not participate	WD	Withdrew	NH	Tournament not held	#R; RR; L#	Lost in # round Round-robin; Last # stage	NYF	Not yet founded

== Titles ==
- PDC secondary tours
  - PDC Challenge Tour
    - 2020: 3
    - 2021 UK: 8
  - PDC Development Tour
    - 2013: 17
