= 2022 WDF Europe Cup =

WDF Europe Cup

Tournament information
- Dates: 28 September – 1 October 2022
- Venue: Gandía Palace Hotel
- Location: Gandía
- Country: Spain
- Organisation(s): WDF
- Format: Legs

Champion(s)
- Singles (France) Jacques Labre (men's); Beau Greaves (women's); Pairs; Scott Williams & Joshua Richardson (men's); Deta Hedman & Beau Greaves (women's); Team; England (men's); England (women's); Overall; England (men's); England (women's)

The 2022 WDF Europe Cup was the 22nd edition of the WDF Europe Cup, organised by the World Darts Federation. The tournament was held for the first time in history at the Gandía Palace Hotel in Gandía, Spain. Medals were distributed in eight disciplines (singles, pairs, teams, and overalls) appropriately for each sex. 41 nations participated in this tournament (in six cases, only men's representation). England won the medal tally.

== Medal tally ==
* Host nation (Spain)

Rank	Nation	Gold	Silver	Bronze	Total
1	England (ENG)	7	0	0	7
2	France (FRA)	1	0	0	1
3	Netherlands (NED)	0	3	3	6
4	Sweden (SWE)	0	2	3	5
5	Finland (FIN)	0	1	0	1
5	Poland (POL)	0	1	0	1
5	Spain (ESP)*	0	1	0	1
8	Wales (WAL)	0	0	3	3
9	Belgium (BEL)	0	0	1	1
9	Czech Republic (CZE)	0	0	1	1
9	Germany (GER)	0	0	1	1
9	Hungary (HUN)	0	0	1	1
9	Ireland (IRL)	0	0	1	1
Totals (13 entries)		8	8	14	30

== Qualifiers ==
Following players was qualified for the tournament:

Country	Men's qualifiers	Women's qualifiers	Ref.
Austria	Felix Losan, Hannes Schnier, Markus Straub, Patrick Tringler	Christine Muzik, Catalina Pasa, Kerstin Rauscher, Jasmin Schnier	
Belgium	Jorgen Aerts, Andy Baetens, Stefaan Deprez, John Desreumaux	Patricia De Peuter, Febe Humblet, Petra Luyten, Marina Rogier	
Bulgaria	Galin Dimov, Iliya Iliev, Krasimir Ivanov, Miroslav Petrov	Cvetelina Bojilova, Iva Ivanova, Debora Urdeva, Plamena Urdeva	
Catalonia	Carles Arola, Josep Arimany, Raul Invernon, Martín Martí	Montse Boronat, Dolores Cascales, Nuria Plaza, Iolanda Riba	
Croatia	Dean Biškupić, Romeo Grbavac, Dragutin Pečnjak, Dean Pokos	Ana Mamut, Olja Pavlović, Marijana Puček, Maja Tešija	
Czechia	Tomáš Houdek, Alexander Mašek, Vítězslav Sedlák, Dalibor Šmolík	Monika Hocková, Barbora Hospodářská, Karolína Rysová, Anna Votavová	
Denmark	Simon Bak, Andreas Jørgensen, Ulrich Meyn, Benjamin Reus	Henriette Honoré, Merete Kjær, Janni Larsen, Michelle Merlit	
Egypt	Ali Eladli, Mohamed Gharib, Mahmoud Mosleh, Mohamed Zoromba	Laila Elansary, Marwa Elfouli, Alya Hassan, Nada Said	
England	James Hurrell, Luke Littler, Joshua Richardson, Scott Williams	Claire Brookin, Beau Greaves, Deta Hedman, Lorraine Winstanley	
Estonia	Raido Kruusvee, Andres Paal, Erki Selling, Olaf Siigur	Liina Joonsaar, Marika Sarrapik, Hanna Tiisler, Tiina Tiisler	
Faroe Islands	Uni Àrting, Jan Erik Fjallstein, Jan McIntosh, Allan vid Rætt	Anffrid Jacobsen, Beinda Midalberg, Jóna Midalberg, Birthe Sikivat	
Finland	Teemu Harju, Jani Keskinarkaus, Paavo Myller, Asko Niskala	Lotta Heinäharju, Sari Nikula, Kaisu Rekinen, Kirsi Viinikainen	
France	Chris Drouard, Jacques Labre, Michaël Leclercq, Xavier Lobbedey	Sandrine Blaszczynsky, Carole Frison, Alexandra Maillet, Carole Monpoux	
Germany	Ole Holtkamp, Erik Tautfest, Jens Ziegler, Daniel Zygla	Irina Armstrong, Monique Leßmeister, Lena Zollikofer, Lisa Zollikofer	
Gibraltar	Craig Galliano, Justin Hewitt, Juan Muñoz, Dyson Parody	—N/a	
Greece	Konstantinos Kotronis, Arsenios Kouparanis, Dimitrios Leivaditis, Dimitrios Tsakiris	—N/a	
Guernsey	Kyle Hutchinson, Darren Luxton, Lee Savident, Ken Waters	Debbie Hamon, Tracy Ingrouille, Caroline La Touche, Nicola Williams	
Hungary	András Borbély, Patrik Kovács, Gábor Takács, József Rucska	Krisztina Csombok, Nóra Erdei, Veronika Ihász, Annamária Ölei	
Iceland	Haraldur Birgisson, Hördur Gudjónsson, Pétur Gudmundsson, Karl Jónsson	Kristín Einarsdóttir, Árdís Sif Gudjónsdóttir, Svenhvit Hammer, Ingibjörg Magnúsdóttir	
Ireland	David Concannon, Mark Cullen, Martin Heneghan, Ciarán Teehan	Caroline Breen, Robyn Byrne, Teresa Maher, Katie Sheldon	
Isle of Man	Robert Corrin, Kevin Lane, Robbie Nelson, Mark Venables	Nikki Bardsley, Janine Halsall, Margaret Kelly, Rachel Robertson	
Italy	Fabio Bendoni, Daniele Petri, Stefano Tomassetti, Michele Turetta	Talita Biagetti, Loredana Brumetz, Aurora Fochesato, Barbara Osti	
Jersey	Sid Bell, Steve Eusebini, Joe de Sousa, Craig Quemard	Amanda Cotillard, Ema Hawley, Angela Le Bailly, Lorraine Porter	
Latvia	Nauris Gleglu, Valters Melderis, Laimonis Naglis, Aigars Strelis	Sandija Andersone, Irena Bauze, Ieva Brikmane, Marija Ružāne	
Liechtenstein	Alexander Allgäuer, Engin Kulali, Remo Senti, Michael Tafner	—N/a	
Lithuania	Mindaugas Barauskas, Tomas Bužonas, Ugnius Jankunas, Laimis Zubavicius	Asta Jukniene, Kornelija Lušaitė, Sandra Rimkieviciute, Milda Zdanauskaite	
Luxembourg	Tom Becker, Daniel Martins, Jim Mayer, Yannick Scheer	—N/a	
Malta	John Aguis, Norbert Attard, Anthony Borg, Albert Scerri	Joanne Borg, Althea Ciantar, Margharita Scerri, Pauline Tonna	
Netherlands	Dennie Olde Kalter, Jelle Klaasen, Wesley Plaisier, Danny van Trijp	Noa-Lynn van Leuven, Lerena Rietbergen, Priscilla Steenbergen, Anca Zijlstra	
Northern Ireland	Neil Duff, Gary Elliot, Chris Gilliland, Davy Glenn	Grace Crane, Helen Dunn, Elaine Moran, Kayleigh O'Neill	
Norway	Cor Dekker, Vegar Elvevoll, Mikael Lindstrøm, Kent Sivertsen	Rita Beck-Hauglid, Iselin Hauen, Veronica Simonsen, Emma Tollerud	
Poland	Sebastian Białecki, Wojciech Bruliński, Tytus Kanik, Dariusz Marciniak	Aleksandra Białecka, Aleksandra Grzesik-Żyłka, Nina Lech-Musialska, Renata Słowikowska	
Romania	Atilla Brodi, Adrian Frim, László Kádár, Vlad Midaescu	Andreea Brad, Anisoara Brinzei, Oana Cimpoca, Giulia Olteanu	
Scotland	Jamie Bain, Scott Campbell, Scott Robertson, Alan Small	Emily Davidson, Lorraine Hyde, Susanna McGimpsey, Chloe O'Brien	
Slovakia	Matej Čverha, Štefan Hájek, František Mika, Juraj Vindiš	Michaela Jamnická, Lucia Jankovská, Katarína Nagyová, Martina Sulovská	
Slovenia	Jan Grošelj, Silvo Javornik, Primož Jelen, Sergej Vodicar	—N/a	
Spain	James Brown, Ruben Orozco, Victor Otero, Sam Salt	Almudena Fajardo, Maria Ivorra, Alicia Martinez, Mila Martinez	
Sweden	Andreas Harrysson, Ricky Nauman, Dennis Nilsson, Edwin Torbjörnsson	Anna Forsmark, Susianne Hägvall, Maud Jansson, Vicky Pruim	
Switzerland	Stefan Bellmont, Andy Bless, Thomas Junghans, Felix Schiertz	Sarah Bartlomé, Fiona Gaylor, Sylvia Schlapbach, Jeannette Stoop	
Ukraine	Vladyslav Melashenko, Ilya Pekaruk, Artem Usyk, Volodymyr Zalevskyi	—N/a	
Wales	Sam Cankett, Nick Kenny, Liam Meek, David Rogers	Rhian O'Sullivan, Leanne Topper, Ann-Marie Potts, Alannah Water-Evans	

== Men's singles (Last 32 onwards) ==
Last 32 (best of 7 legs); 30 September
Sebastian Białecki 89.73	4
Robert Nelson 82.81	0
James Hurrell 87.13	4
Daniele Petri 73.96	0
Danny van Trijp 90.18	4
Chris Drouard 76.67	1
László Kádár 72.66	4
David Concannon 68.52	2
Atilla Brodi 76.29	1
Scott Williams 99.28	4
Vítězslav Sedlák 87.86	3
Jan McIntosh 88.50	4
Nick Kenny 85.06	4
Dennie Olde Kalter 79.37	2
Teemu Harju 83.10	4
Alan Small 79.34	3
Andy Baetens 87.31	4
David Rogers 90.38	2
Cor Dekker 91.73	4
Jelle Klaasen 85.58	3
Jani Keskinarkaus 77.19	1
Luke Littler 93.81	4
Valters Melderis 77.39	0
Stefan Bellmont 101.90	4
Dragutin Pečnjak 75.89	3
Stefaan Deprez 75.69	4
Thomas Junghans 66.63	0
Alexander Mašek 72.43	4
Andreas Harrysson 84.28	3
Vegar Elvevoll 74.04	4
Jacques Labre 87.54	4
Olaf Siigur 76.63	1

Last 16 (best of 7 legs); 30 September
Sebastian Białecki 93.94	4
James Hurrell 92.60	0
Danny van Trijp 94.70	4
László Kádár 94.62	1
Scott Williams 95.13	1
Jan McIntosh 103.90	4
Nick Kenny 84.76	3
Teemu Harju 87.56	4
Andy Baetens 94.53	4
Cor Dekker 96.87	3
Luke Littler 90.99	4
Stefan Bellmont 94.08	3
Stefaan Deprez 76.98	3
Alexander Mašek 80.87	4
Vegar Elvevoll 75.27	0
Jacques Labre 87.13	4

Quarter-finals (best of 9 legs); 30 September
Sebastian Białecki 90.03	2
Danny van Trijp 94.95	5
Jan McIntosh 80.38	3
Teemu Harju 83.31	5
Andy Baetens 94.98	5
Luke Littler 85.41	4
Alexander Mašek 82.21	4
Jacques Labre 90.31	5

Semi-finals (best of 11 legs); 30 September
Danny van Trijp 89.18	1
Teemu Harju 86.95	6
Andy Baetens 96.04	5
Jacques Labre 91.23	6

Final (best of 13 legs); 1 October
Teemu Harju 88.95	2
Jacques Labre 96.56	7

== Women's singles (Last 32 onwards) ==
Last 32 (best of 7 legs); 29 September
Dolores Cascales 50.71	1
Veronika Ihász 63.05	4
Irina Armstrong 63.00	2
Oana Cimpoca 57.67	4
Merete Kjær 59.34	0
Katie Sheldon 66.80	4
Lorraine Winstanley 67.92	4
Vicky Pruim 63.84	1
Henriette Honore 54.13	2
Noa-Lynn van Leuven 76.87	4
Monique Leßmeister 66.80	4
Fiona Gaylor 57.33	0
Veronica Simonsen 57.46	2
Deta Hedman 64.60	4
Beinta Midalberg 52.07	0
Almudena Fajardo 67.55	4
Lotta Heinäharju 52.00	0
Rhian O'Sullivan 71.57	4
Claire Brookin 68.32	4
Lorraine Hyde 57.93	0
Caroline Breen 60.53	4
Aleksandra Białecka 51.14	2
Anna Forsmark 58.96	2
Aurora Fochesato 61.55	4
Beau Greaves 66.24	4
Martina Sulovská 62.17	1
Anca Zijlstra 66.72	4
Michelle Merlit 63.79	3
Robyn Byrne 75.24	4
Maud Jansson 58.74	1
Marina Rogier 58.99	3
Alannah Waters-Evans 61.90	4

Last 16 (best of 7 legs); 29 September
Veronika Ihász 63.05	4
Oana Cimpoca 56.13	1
Katie Sheldon 67.43	0
Lorraine Winstanley 69.91	4
Noa-Lynn van Leuven 66.87	1
Monique Leßmeister 72.90	4
Deta Hedman 75.69	3
Almudena Fajardo 79.46	4
Rhian O'Sullivan 80.64	4
Claire Brookin 66.78	1
Caroline Breen 52.85	0
Aurora Fochesato 60.12	4
Beau Greaves 87.13	4
Anca Zijlstra 76.05	0
Robyn Byrne 66.56	4
Alannah Waters-Evans 62.51	3

Quarter-finals (best of 9 legs); 29 September
Veronika Ihász 62.59	5
Lorraine Winstanley 64.75	3
Monique Leßmeister 68.93	4
Almudena Fajardo 70.26	5
Rhian O'Sullivan 70.49	5
Aurora Fochesato 62.96	3
Beau Greaves 87.81	5
Robyn Byrne 80.59	2

Semi-finals (best of 11 legs); 29 September
Veronika Ihász 61.47	4
Almudena Fajardo 64.96	6
Rhian O'Sullivan 68.97	1
Beau Greaves 85.97	6

Final (best of 13 legs); 1 October
Almudena Fajardo 71.74	4
Beau Greaves 76.01	7

== Men's pairs (Last 16 onwards) ==
Last 16 (best of 7 legs); 29 September
Wales 80.16; Sam Cankett, Nick Kenny	4
Lithuania 72.45; Mindaugas Barauskas, Ugnius Jankūnas	0
Denmark 86.02; Simon Bak, Benjamin Reus	2
England 95.24; James Hurrell, Luke Littler	4
Croatia 82.55; Dean Biškupić, Dragutin Pečnjak	4
Faroe Islands 77.91; Uni Àrting, Jan McIntosh	2
Poland 88.67; Sebastian Białecki, Dariusz Marciniak	4
Switzerland 83.51; Stefan Bellmont, Thomas Junghans	1
Romania 71.96; Atilla Brodi, László Kádár	4
Gibraltar 72.21; Juan Muñoz, Dyson Parody	1
Wales 78.38; Liam Meek, David Rogers	2
England 81.77; Joshua Richardson, Scott Williams	4
Sweden 70.60; Andreas Harrysson, Dennis Nilsson	1
Czech Republic 73.68; Alexander Mašek, Vítězslav Sedlák	4
Estonia 70.43; Raido Kruusvee, Andres Paal	2
Scotland 75.49; Jamie Bain, Alan Small	4

Quarter-finals (best of 7 legs); 29 September
Wales 84.03	4
England 83.02	1
Croatia 80.36	2
Poland 76.80	4
Romania 80.10	1
England 85.27	4
Czech Republic 96.03	4
Scotland 83.68	1

Semi-finals (best of 9 legs); 29 September
Wales 70.91	4
Poland 69.06	5
England 82.60	5
Czech Republic 79.96	1

Final (best of 11 legs); 1 October
Poland 70.77	2
England 88.00	6

== Women's pairs (Last 16 onwards) ==
Last 16 (best of 7 legs); 30 September
(Wales) Rhian O'Sullivan 71.57 (Wales) Ann-Marie Potts	4
(Finland) Sari Nikula 58.83 (Finland) Kirsi Viinikainen	1
(Italy) Barbara Osti 41.85 (Italy) Loredana Brumetz	0
(England) Deta Hedman 65.34 (England) Beau Greaves	4
(Hungary) Veronika Ihász 46.50 (Hungary) Annamária Ölei	3
(Spain) Almudena Fajardo 45.54 (Spain) Alicia Martínez	4
(Netherlands) Priscilla Steenbergen 76.83 (Netherlands) Noa-Lynn van Leuven	0
(Sweden) Anna Forsmark 75.15 (Sweden) Maud Jansson	4
(Romania) Oana Cimpoca 38.25 (Romania) Anișoara Brînzei	0
(Sweden) Vicky Pruim 55.66 (Sweden) Susianne Hägvall	4
(Lithuania) Kornelija Lušaitė 47.66 (Lithuania) Sandra Rimkevičiūtė	0
(England) Lorraine Winstanley 60.12 (England) Claire Brookin	4
(Denmark) Michelle Merlit 66.14 (Denmark) Henriette Honoré	2
(Netherlands) Anca Zijlstra 71.57 (Netherlands) Lerena Rietbergen	4
(Switzerland) Sylvia Schlapbach 81.83 (Switzerland) Sarah Bartlomé	2
(Republic of Ireland) Katie Sheldon 88.41 (Republic of Ireland) Robyn Byrne	4

Quarter-finals (best of 7 legs); 30 September
(Wales) Rhian O'Sullivan 74.16 (Wales) Ann-Marie Potts	3
(England) Deta Hedman 83.50 (England) Beau Greaves	4
(Spain) Almudena Fajardo 61.37 (Spain) Alicia Martínez	3
(Sweden) Anna Forsmark 55.66 (Sweden) Maud Jansson	4
(Sweden) Vicky Pruim 68.31 (Sweden) Susianne Hägvall	4
(England) Lorraine Winstanley 67.85 (England) Claire Brookin	0
(Netherlands) Anca Zijlstra 68.31 (Netherlands) Lerena Rietbergen	4
(Republic of Ireland) Katie Sheldon 58.42 (Republic of Ireland) Robyn Byrne	1

Semi-finals (best of 9 legs); 30 September
(England) Deta Hedman 88.41 (England) Beau Greaves	5
(Sweden) Anna Forsmark 49.83 (Sweden) Maud Jansson	0
(Sweden) Vicky Pruim 57.80 (Sweden) Susianne Hägvall	5
(Netherlands) Anca Zijlstra 55.87 (Netherlands) Lerena Rietbergen	0

Final (best of 11 legs); 1 October
(England) Deta Hedman 75.15 (England) Beau Greaves	6
(Sweden) Vicky Pruim 67.00 (Sweden) Susianne Hägvall	3

== Men's team (Last 16 onwards) ==
Last 16 (best of 17 legs); 29 September
England 87.24	9
Czech Republic 79.75	7
Croatia 77.41	9
Germany 75.60	6
Scotland 78.29	9
Belgium 73.20	5
Sweden 75.53	9
Switzerland 71.47	7
Ireland 71.45	9
Lithuania 63.17	4
Wales 85.39	9
Norway 77.92	2
Finland 67.97	9
Malta 61.14	0
Netherlands 80.53	9
Denmark 73.40	4

Quarter-finals (best of 17 legs); 29 September
England 83.32	9
Croatia 74.52	7
Scotland 82.73	8
Sweden 78.26	9
Ireland 78.67	9
Wales 79.00	8
Finland 78.92	6
Netherlands 81.82	9

Semi-finals (best of 17 legs); 1 October
England 86.22	9
Sweden 78.24	2
Ireland 80.56	6
Netherlands 85.03	9

Final (best of 17 legs); 1 October
England 82.21	9
Netherlands 81.09	8

== Women's team (Last 16 onwards) ==
Last 16 (best of 17 legs); 29 September
England 56.20	9
Latvia 45.74	3
Finland 51.14	9
Denmark 48.14	5
Sweden 56.91	9
Belgium 42.40	1
Wales 63.21	8
Ireland 63.04	9
Germany 57.23	9
Italy 51.26	4
Spain 56.57	9
Poland 57.20	8
Scotland 54.62	9
Northern Ireland 44.36	2
Netherlands 61.32	9
Czech Republic 53.48	1

Quarter-finals (best of 17 legs); 30 September
England 64.81	9
Finland 57.32	2
Sweden 59.35	9
Ireland 55.45	7
Germany 58.79	9
Spain 56.68	6
Scotland 56.95	7
Netherlands 60.14	9

Semi-finals (best of 17 legs); 1 October
England 66.23	9
Sweden 63.10	7
Germany 56.99	6
Netherlands 58.32	9

Final (best of 17 legs); 1 October
England 64.43	9
Netherlands 55.64	1

== Overall champions ==
Category	Gold	Silver	Bronze	Ref.
Men's	England	Netherlands	Wales	
Women's	England	Sweden	Netherlands	
