= 2019 Dutch Darts Masters =

Tournament information
- Dates: 24–26 May 2019
- Venue: IJsselhallen
- Location: Zwolle
- Country: Netherlands
- Organisation(s): PDC
- Format: Legs
- Prize fund: £140,000
- Winner's share: £25,000
- High checkout: 170 (England) Alan Norris (Netherlands) Michael van Gerwen

Champion(s)
- (England) Ian White

The 2019 Dutch Darts Masters was the seventh of thirteen PDC European Tour events on the 2019 PDC Pro Tour. The tournament took place at IJsselhallen, Zwolle, Netherlands, from 24 to 26 May 2019. It featured a field of 48 players and £140,000 in prize money, with £25,000 going to the winner.

Michael van Gerwen was the defending champion after defeating Steve Lennon 8–5 in the final of the 2018 tournament.

However, Ian White ended Van Gerwen's five-year winning run in the tournament by beating him 8–7 in the final to win his third European Tour title.

The result also ended Van Gerwen's 28-game winning streak in European Tour last-leg deciders.

== Prize money ==
This is how the prize money is divided:

Stage (num. of players)		Prize money
Winner	(1)	£25,000
Runner-up	(1)	£10,000
Semi-finalists	(2)	£6,500
Quarter-finalists	(4)	£5,000
Third round losers	(8)	£3,000
Second round losers	(16)	£2,000*
First round losers	(16)	£1,000
Total	£140,000	

- Seeded players who lose in the second round do not receive this prize money on any Orders of Merit.

== Qualification and format ==
The top 16 entrants from the PDC ProTour Order of Merit on 7 May will automatically qualify for the event and will be seeded in the second round.

The remaining 32 places will go to players from six qualifying events – 18 from the UK Tour Card Holder Qualifier (held on 17 May), six from the European Tour Card Holder Qualifier (held on 17 May), two from the West & South European Associate Member Qualifier (held on 18 May), four from the Host Nation Qualifier (held on 23 May), one from the Nordic & Baltic Associate Member Qualifier (held on 8 March) and one from the East European Associate Member Qualifier (held on 10 March).

From 2019, the Host Nation, Nordic & Baltic and East European Qualifiers will only be available to non-tour card holders. Any tour card holders from the applicable regions will have to play the main European Qualifier.

Rob Cross, who was set to be the 7th seed, withdrew prior to the tournament. All seeds below him moved up a place, with Michael Smith becoming sixteenth seed, and an extra place being made available in the Host Nation Qualifier.

James Wade, the 5th seed, withdrew from the tournament after the draw and was not replaced, with his second round opponent Glen Durrant receiving a bye.

The following players will take part in the tournament:

Top 16

1. (Netherlands) Michael van Gerwen (runner-up)
2. (England) Ian White (champion)
3. (Northern Ireland) Daryl Gurney (second round)
4. (Wales) Gerwyn Price (semi-finals)
5. (England) ~~James Wade~~ (withdrew)
6. (Scotland) Peter Wright (quarter-finals)
7. (Austria) Mensur Suljović (second round)
8. (England) Dave Chisnall (quarter-finals)
9. (England) Ricky Evans (third round)
10. (England) Joe Cullen (second round)
11. (Australia) Simon Whitlock (third round)
12. (Wales) Jonny Clayton (second round)
13. (England) Stephen Bunting (second round)
14. (England) Darren Webster (second round)
15. (Netherlands) Jermaine Wattimena (third round)
16. (England) Michael Smith (second round)

UK Qualifier
- (England) Steve Beaton (second round)
- (England) Nathan Aspinall (first round)
- (England) Mervyn King (quarter-finals)
- (England) Ryan Harrington (first round)
- (England) Harry Ward (first round)
- (Northern Ireland) Mickey Mansell (second round)
- (England) Ritchie Edhouse (second round)
- (England) Keegan Brown (first round)
- (England) Ross Smith (first round)
- (England) Glen Durrant (quarter-finals)
- (England) Luke Woodhouse (first round)
- (Republic of Ireland) William O'Connor (second round)
- (England) Alan Norris (first round)
- (Australia) Kyle Anderson (first round)
- (Northern Ireland) Brendan Dolan (third round)
- (England) Andy Boulton (first round)
- (England) Ryan Joyce (first round)

European Qualifier
- (Austria) Rowby-John Rodriguez (third round)
- (Poland) Krzysztof Ratajski (second round)
- (Netherlands) Danny Noppert (second round)
- (Germany) Max Hopp (third round)
- (Netherlands) Raymond van Barneveld (third round)
- (Netherlands) Vincent van der Voort (quarter-finals)

West/South European Qualifier
- (Belgium) Mike De Decker (first round)
- (Germany) Florian Hempel (second round)

Host Nation Qualifier
- (Netherlands) Erik Hol (first round)
- (Netherlands) Jimmy Hendriks (first round)
- (Netherlands) Danny van Trijp (second round)
- (Netherlands) Wesley Plaisier (first round)
- (Netherlands) Alexander Merkx (first round)

Nordic & Baltic Qualifier
- (Sweden) Dennis Nilsson (third round)

East European Qualifier
- (Hungary) Pál Székely (first round)

== Draw ==
First round (best of 11 legs); 24 May
(England) Ryan Joyce 87.98	2
(Republic of Ireland) William O'Connor 93.10	6
(Hungary) Pál Székely 73.27	2
(Netherlands) Raymond van Barneveld 89.75	6
(England) Alan Norris 84.37	4
(England) Steve Beaton 88.36	6
(England) Keegan Brown 89.44	5
(Netherlands) Danny van Trijp 92.77	6
(Netherlands) Alexander Merkx 77.13	1
(England) Glen Durrant 88.67	6
(Sweden) Dennis Nilsson 83.50	6
(Netherlands) Erik Hol 68.82	0
(England) Ross Smith 99.51	3
(Poland) Krzysztof Ratajski 97.45	6
(Northern Ireland) Brendan Dolan 92.37	6
(Netherlands) Wesley Plaisier 83.71	1
(Northern Ireland) Mickey Mansell 91.67	6
(Australia) Kyle Anderson 93.79	4
(Netherlands) Danny Noppert 104.56	6
(England) Harry Ward 103.32	1
(England) Andy Boulton 85.57	2
(Netherlands) Vincent van der Voort 89.86	6
(Germany) Max Hopp 96.11	6
(England) Nathan Aspinall 100.62	5
(England) Ritchie Edhouse 91.35	6
(Netherlands) Jimmy Hendriks 79.74	2
(Germany) Florian Hempel 92.02	6
(England) Ryan Harrington 87.10	0
(England) Luke Woodhouse 86.40	2
(England) Mervyn King 95.21	6
(Belgium) Mike De Decker 104.72	2
(Austria) Rowby-John Rodriguez 108.79	6

Second round (best of 11 legs); 25 May
1	(Netherlands) Michael van Gerwen 106.88	6
(Republic of Ireland) William O'Connor 103.51	2
16	(England) Michael Smith 89.64	3
(Netherlands) Raymond van Barneveld 90.97	6
8	(England) Dave Chisnall 92.23	6
(England) Steve Beaton 95.45	2
9	(England) Ricky Evans 94.12	6
(Netherlands) Danny van Trijp 95.95	2
5	(England) James Wade	w/d
(England) Glen Durrant	w/o
12	(Wales) Jonny Clayton 92.54	5
(Sweden) Dennis Nilsson 85.98	6
4	(Wales) Gerwyn Price 103.07	6
(Poland) Krzysztof Ratajski 96.00	1
13	(England) Stephen Bunting 95.43	4
(Northern Ireland) Brendan Dolan 97.20	6
2	(England) Ian White 96.95	6
(Northern Ireland) Mickey Mansell 94.05	5
15	(Netherlands) Jermaine Wattimena 99.70	6
(Netherlands) Danny Noppert 96.57	4
7	(Austria) Mensur Suljović 96.75	3
(Netherlands) Vincent van der Voort 96.45	6
10	(England) Joe Cullen 85.94	0
(Germany) Max Hopp 92.97	6
6	(Scotland) Peter Wright 98.49	6
(England) Ritchie Edhouse 92.81	4
11	(Australia) Simon Whitlock 103.51	6
(Germany) Florian Hempel 93.48	3
3	(Northern Ireland) Daryl Gurney 95.69	1
(England) Mervyn King 98.85	6
14	(England) Darren Webster 86.53	2
(Austria) Rowby-John Rodriguez 92.90	6

Third round (best of 11 legs); 26 May
1	(Netherlands) van Gerwen 98.01	6
(Netherlands) van Barneveld 95.07	5
8	(England) Chisnall 102.31	6
9	(England) Evans 99.58	5
(England) Durrant 103.66	6
(Sweden) Nilsson 86.57	0
4	(Wales) Price 95.46	6
(Northern Ireland) Dolan 91.75	3
2	(England) White 96.20	6
15	(Netherlands) Wattimena 91.52	2
(Netherlands) van der Voort 100.78	6
(Germany) Hopp 87.36	4
6	(Scotland) Wright 85.34	6
11	(Australia) Whitlock 84.52	3
(England) King 96.43	6
(Austria) Rodriguez 95.48	5

Quarter-finals (best of 11 legs); 26 May
1	(Netherlands) van Gerwen 98.64	6
8	(England) Chisnall 99.09	4
(England) Durrant 97.93	3
4	(Wales) Price 104.55	6
2	(England) White 99.91	6
(Netherlands) van der Voort 95.06	3
6	(Scotland) Wright 97.07	6
(England) King 89.84	4

Semi-finals (best of 13 legs); 26 May
1	(Netherlands) van Gerwen 104.23	7
4	(Wales) Price 98.38	6
2	(England) White 86.71	7
6	(Scotland) Wright 86.89	3

Final (best of 15 legs); 26 May
1	(Netherlands) van Gerwen 96.95	7
2	(England) White 93.01	8
