= Dariusz Marciniak (darts player) =

Polish darts player

Personal information
- Full name: Dariusz Marciniak
- Nickname: "Pink Panther"
- Born: 19 December 1982 (age 43) Zielona Góra, Poland
- Home town: Zielona Góra, Poland

Sport
- Sport: Darts
- Playing since: 2013
- Laterality: Right-handed

Organisation (see split in darts)
- WDF: 2022–

WDF major events – best performances
- World Masters: Last 256: 2022
Medal record
Men's Darts
Representing Poland
WDF Europe Cup
| Silver medal – second place | 2022 Gandía | Men's pairs |

Dariusz Marciniak (born 19 December 1982) is a Polish professional darts player who currently plays in World Darts Federation (WDF) events. He has represented Poland at the WDF Europe Cup. He is the first Polish medalist of this event, together with Sebastian Białecki.

== Career ==
Marciniak is one of the leading players from the Lubuskie Voivodeship. Thanks to his good performances in domestic Grand Prix tournaments, at the end of September 2022, he was selected by the national federation to participate in the 2022 WDF Europe Cup.

On the second day of the tournament, he advanced to the finals of the pairs competition where he played together with Sebastian Białecki. On the way to first medal of this event for Poland, they defeated, among others rivals from Switzerland (Thomas Junghans and Stefan Bellmont) and Wales (Sam Cankett and Nick Kenny). Ultimately, on October 1, they were defeated by the England pairs Joshua Richardson and Scott Williams by 2–6 in legs. On the third day of the tournament, he lost in the first round match against József Rucska by 1–5 in legs. In the team competition, he did not make it to the final phase.

In early December, he made his debut in the 2022 World Masters, but he ended his competition at the group stage, lost all matches.

== Performance timeline ==
| Tournament | 2022 |
|---|---|
WDF Ranked televised events
| World Masters | RR |
