= 2022 PDC Players Championship series =

2022 Darts tournament series

The 2022 PDC Players Championship series consisted of 30 darts tournaments on the 2022 PDC Pro Tour.

The Top 64 on the Players Championship Order of Merit qualified for the 2022 Players Championship Finals.

== Prize money ==
The prize money for the Players Championship events rose from 2021 levels, with each event having a prize fund of £100,000.

This is how the prize money was divided:

Stage (no. of players)		Prize money (Total: £100,000)
Winner	(1)	£12,000
Runner-up	(1)	£8,000
Semi-finalists	(2)	£4,000
Quarter-finalists	(4)	£3,000
Fourth round	(8)	£2,000
Third round	(16)	£1,250
Second round	(32)	£750
First round	(64)	N/A

== February ==
=== Players Championship 1 ===
Players Championship 1 was contested on Saturday 5 February 2022 at the Barnsley Metrodome. The tournament was won by Luke Humphries, who defeated Ryan Searle 8–4 in the final.

Quarter-finals (best of 11 legs)
16	Krzysztof Ratajski 87.11	1
9	Ryan Searle 115.02	6
4	Peter Wright 107.36	6
5	Jonny Clayton 92.69	0
Gary Anderson 98.21	5
26	Daryl Gurney 95.94	6
14	Luke Humphries 95.32	6
6	Joe Cullen 101.69	5

Semi-finals (best of 13 legs)
9	Ryan Searle 103.82	7
4	Peter Wright 102.73	5
26	Daryl Gurney 98.44	6
14	Luke Humphries 96.70	7

Final (best of 15 legs)
9	Ryan Searle 94.05	4
14	Luke Humphries 100.55	8

=== Players Championship 2 ===
Players Championship 2 was contested on Sunday 6 February 2022 at the Barnsley Metrodome. Ian White hit a nine-dart finish against Mensur Suljović. The tournament was won by Peter Wright, who defeated Gerwyn Price 8–5 in the final.

Quarter-finals (best of 11 legs)
1	Gerwyn Price 103.97	6
Stephen Burton 84.80	1
Boris Krčmar 98.66	6
21	Stephen Bunting 94.85	3
15	Damon Heta 99.71	6
Niels Zonneveld 94.24	1
3	Peter Wright 99.23	6
11	Rob Cross 99.26	4

Semi-finals (best of 13 legs)
1	Gerwyn Price 98.33	7
Boris Krčmar 94.29	0
15	Damon Heta 98.45	3
3	Peter Wright 104.58	7

Final (best of 15 legs)
1	Gerwyn Price 96.55	5
3	Peter Wright 95.37	8

=== Players Championship 3 ===
Players Championship 3 was contested on Saturday 12 February 2022 at the Robin Park Sports Centre in Wigan. Matt Campbell hit a nine-dart finish against Damon Heta. The tournament was won by Joe Cullen, who defeated Damon Heta 8–4 in the final.

Quarter-finals (best of 11 legs)
17	James Wade 94.76	4
8	Michael van Gerwen 93.46	6
Joe Murnan 94.76	3
12	Damon Heta 106.30	6
Keane Barry 101.84	5
Connor Scutt 95.31	6
3	José de Sousa 90.65	5
6	Joe Cullen 101.49	6

Semi-finals (best of 13 legs)
8	Michael van Gerwen 102.06	4
12	Damon Heta 109.03	7
Connor Scutt 85.76	5
6	Joe Cullen 89.63	7

Final (best of 15 legs)
12	Damon Heta 99.37	4
6	Joe Cullen 95.35	8

=== Players Championship 4 ===
Players Championship 4 was contested on Sunday 13 February 2022 at the Robin Park Sports Centre in Wigan. The tournament was won by Joe Cullen, who defeated Dimitri Van den Bergh 8–1 in the final.

Quarter-finals (best of 11 legs)
1	Gerwyn Price 104.59	6
9	Luke Humphries 102.61	5
4	Joe Cullen 103.17	6
12	Rob Cross 99.52	5
15	Krzysztof Ratajski 99.17	6
23	Dave Chisnall 98.35	5
14	Dimitri Van den Bergh 108.56	6
22	Daryl Gurney 102.45	5

Semi-finals (best of 13 legs)
1	Gerwyn Price 102.29	5
4	Joe Cullen 94.16	7
15	Krzysztof Ratajski 92.73	4
14	Dimitri Van den Bergh 99.75	7

Final (best of 15 legs)
4	Joe Cullen 102.34	8
14	Dimitri Van den Bergh 95.06	1

== March ==
=== Players Championship 5 ===
Players Championship 5 was contested on Saturday 19 March 2022 at the Barnsley Metrodome. Joe Cullen hit a nine-dart finish against James Wilson, whilst Josh Rock also did the same against Dave Chisnall. The tournament was won by Damon Heta, who defeated Gary Anderson 8–6 in the final.

Quarter-finals (best of 11 legs)
Gary Anderson 113.45	6
8	Rob Cross 104.56	2
4	Joe Cullen 105.59	6
12	Dirk van Duijvenbode 108.88	3
18	Daryl Gurney 87.86	3
10	Damon Heta 95.22	6
Mike De Decker 95.90	4
6	Dimitri Van den Bergh 98.39	6

Semi-finals (best of 13 legs)
Gary Anderson 104.23	7
4	Joe Cullen 91.22	3
10	Damon Heta 91.98	7
6	Dimitri Van den Bergh 92.87	4

Final (best of 15 legs)
Gary Anderson 103.42	6
10	Damon Heta 107.27	8

=== Players Championship 6 ===
Players Championship 6 was contested on Sunday 20 March 2022 at the Barnsley Metrodome in Barnsley. Danny Noppert hit a nine-dart finish in his loss to Ricky Evans. The tournament was won by Jim Williams, who defeated Ricky Evans 8–6 in the final.

Quarter-finals (best of 11 legs)
Josh Rock 82.65	1
24	Martin Schindler 98.19	6
Jim Williams 93.23	6
5	Michael Smith 100.22	3
Ian White 103.11	4
23	Danny Noppert 96.37	6
Ricky Evans 89.15	6
22	Gabriel Clemens 88.12	3

Semi-finals (best of 13 legs)
24	Martin Schindler 95.31	5
Jim Williams 96.17	7
23	Danny Noppert 95.80	4
Ricky Evans 95.17	7

Final (best of 15 legs)
Jim Williams 89.92	8
Ricky Evans 85.79	6

=== Players Championship 7 ===
Players Championship 7 was contested on Saturday 26 March 2022 at the H+ Hotel in Niedernhausen. José de Sousa hit a nine-dart finish against Keane Barry, whilst Raymond van Barneveld also did the same against Adam Hunt. The tournament was won by Gerwyn Price, who defeated Madars Razma 8–4 in the final.

Quarter-finals (best of 11 legs)
1	Gerwyn Price 102.97	6
8	Dirk van Duijvenbode 96.63	3
Scott Williams 93.76	3
5	Rob Cross 101.24	6
Gary Blades 78.28	3
Madars Razma 80.25	6
3	José de Sousa 86.38	4
Kevin Doets 94.14	6

Semi-finals (best of 13 legs)
1	Gerwyn Price 90.64	7
5	Rob Cross 100.44	6
Madars Razma 94.75	7
Kevin Doets 90.28	3

Final (best of 15 legs)
1	Gerwyn Price 101.02	8
Madars Razma 93.05	4

=== Players Championship 8 ===
Players Championship 8 was contested on Sunday 27 March 2022 at the H+ Hotel in Niedernhausen. The tournament was won by Michael van Gerwen, who defeated Martin Schindler 8–4 in the final.

Quarter-finals (best of 11 legs)
16	Martin Schindler 91.42	6
9	Daryl Gurney 87.93	2
13	Stephen Bunting 90.08	4
21	Adrian Lewis 95.96	6
2	Michael van Gerwen 101.65	6
10	Brendan Dolan 101.63	4
14	James Wade 92.63	5
6	Luke Humphries 94.11	6

Semi-finals (best of 13 legs)
16	Martin Schindler 98.50	7
21	Adrian Lewis 94.93	2
2	Michael van Gerwen 97.49	7
6	Luke Humphries 97.07	5

Final (best of 15 legs)
16	Martin Schindler 98.60	4
2	Michael van Gerwen 102.42	8

== April ==
=== Players Championship 9 ===
Players Championship 9 was contested on Friday 1 April 2022 at the Barnsley Metrodome. Simon Whitlock hit a nine-dart finish against Mike De Decker. The tournament was won by Danny Jansen, who defeated Andrew Gilding 8–6 in the final.

Quarter-finals (best of 11 legs)
Mario Vandenbogaerde 89.62	4
25	Dave Chisnall 90.55	6
Danny Jansen 92.90	6
21	Chris Dobey 91.89	4
2	Michael van Gerwen 101.07	2
23	Danny Noppert 103.28	6
3	José de Sousa 95.61	3
Andrew Gilding 104.90	6

Semi-finals (best of 13 legs)
25	Dave Chisnall 96.41	6
Danny Jansen 96.36	7
23	Danny Noppert 94.09	4
Andrew Gilding 98.83	7

Final (best of 15 legs)
Danny Jansen 95.51	8
Andrew Gilding 95.37	6

=== Players Championship 10 ===
Players Championship 10 was contested on Saturday 2 April 2022 at the Barnsley Metrodome. The tournament was won by Michael van Gerwen, who defeated Peter Wright 8–4 in the final.

Quarter-finals (best of 11 legs)
Jeff Smith 92.84	3
9	Damon Heta 93.64	6
4	Peter Wright 101.19	6
21	Nathan Aspinall 106.93	5
2	Michael van Gerwen 94.78	6
26	Adrian Lewis 92.57	5
3	José de Sousa 92.43	6
11	Luke Humphries 96.17	5

Semi-finals (best of 13 legs)
9	Damon Heta 103.63	3
4	Peter Wright 108.34	7
2	Michael van Gerwen 100.04	7
3	José de Sousa 93.79	6

Final (best of 15 legs)
4	Peter Wright 97.82	4
2	Michael van Gerwen 96.59	8

=== Players Championship 11 ===
Players Championship 11 was contested on Sunday 3 April 2022 at the Barnsley Metrodome. Madars Razma hit a nine-dart finish against Michael Unterbuchner. The tournament was won by Ryan Searle, who defeated Nathan Aspinall 8–3 in the final.

Quarter-finals (best of 11 legs)
Josh Rock 93.31	0
9	Ryan Searle 100.20	6
4	Joe Cullen 100.86	5
5	Rob Cross 106.00	6
31	Vincent van der Voort 83.05	2
23	Dave Chisnall 100.49	6
19	Nathan Aspinall 93.38	6
27	Callan Rydz 90.47	2

Semi-finals (best of 13 legs)
9	Ryan Searle 96.85	7
59	Rob Cross 101.90	6
23	Dave Chisnall 92.33	5
19	Nathan Aspinall 105.83	7

Final (best of 15 legs)
9	Ryan Searle 103.02	8
19	Nathan Aspinall 100.88	3

=== Players Championship 12 ===
Players Championship 12 was contested on Saturday 9 April 2022 at the Barnsley Metrodome. The tournament was won by Dirk van Duijvenbode, who defeated Ryan Searle 8–7 in the final.

Quarter-finals (best of 11 legs)
Gordon Mathers 89.66	3
9	Michael Smith 95.59	6
Simon Whitlock 88.03	0
12	Dirk van Duijvenbode 96.97	6
15	Jonny Clayton 99.20	3
10	Damon Heta 99.17	6
José Justicia 101.67	5
6	Ryan Searle 106.64	6

Semi-finals (best of 13 legs)
9	Michael Smith 85.02	2
12	Dirk van Duijvenbode 98.79	7
10	Damon Heta 97.31	2
6	Ryan Searle 97.63	7

Final (best of 15 legs)
12	Dirk van Duijvenbode 98.04	8
6	Ryan Searle 104.05	7

=== Players Championship 13 ===
Players Championship 13 was contested on Sunday 10 April 2022 at the Barnsley Metrodome. The tournament was won by Nathan Aspinall, who defeated Matt Campbell 8–6 in the final.

Quarter-finals (best of 11 legs)
Martin Lukeman 89.27	4
24	Gabriel Clemens 92.31	6
Matt Campbell 91.45	6
28	Martijn Kleermaker 92.19	3
15	Brendan Dolan 90.57	6
Scott Waites 86.66	1
14	Nathan Aspinall 94.17	6
6	Rob Cross 89.91	3

Semi-finals (best of 13 legs)
24	Gabriel Clemens 97.91	2
Matt Campbell 96.84	7
15	Brendan Dolan 81.30	3
14	Nathan Aspinall 91.22	7

Final (best of 15 legs)
Matt Campbell 91.41	6
14	Nathan Aspinall 96.41	8

== May ==
=== Players Championship 14 ===
Players Championship 14 was contested on Tuesday 10 May 2022 at the Robin Park Sports Centre in Wigan. Damon Heta and Ross Smith hit nine-dart finishes against Keegan Brown and Geert De Vos respectively. The tournament was won by Michael Smith, who defeated John O'Shea 8–5 in the final.

Quarter-finals (best of 11 legs)
James Wilson 95.59	4
8	Michael Smith 97.65	6
Ritchie Edhouse 96.50	4
5	Damon Heta 104.26	6
15	Dave Chisnall 96.68	6
10	Krzysztof Ratajski 93.20	3
Maik Kuivenhoven 88.67	4
John O'Shea 90.56	6

Semi-finals (best of 13 legs)
8	Michael Smith 98.40	7
5	Damon Heta 97.33	2
15	Dave Chisnall 86.16	4
John O'Shea 87.88	7

Final (best of 15 legs)
8	Michael Smith 101.39	8
John O'Shea 93.81	5

=== Players Championship 15 ===
Players Championship 15 was contested on Wednesday 11 May 2022 at the Robin Park Sports Centre in Wigan. Nathan Girvan and Michael Smith hit nine-dart finishes against Adrian Lewis and Florian Hempel respectively. The tournament was won by Michael Smith, who defeated Callan Rydz 8–3 in the final.

Quarter-finals (best of 11 legs)
Alan Soutar 85.11	6
Josh Rock 91.38	4
4	Michael Smith 114.90	6
Florian Hempel 94.64	2
18	Callan Rydz 102.65	6
7	Dirk van Duijvenbode 103.11	4
3	Damon Heta 98.22	4
27	Ryan Joyce 96.52	6

Semi-finals (best of 13 legs)
Alan Soutar 90.37	3
4	Michael Smith 92.73	7
18	Callan Rydz 104.07	7
27	Ryan Joyce 91.79	1

Final (best of 15 legs)
4	Michael Smith 109.95	8
18	Callan Rydz 104.13	3

== June ==
=== Players Championship 16 ===
Players Championship 16 was contested on Tuesday 14 June 2022 at the H+ Hotel in Niedernhausen. The tournament was won by Michael Smith, who defeated Dirk van Duijvenbode 8–6 in the final.

Quarter-finals (best of 11 legs)
1	Luke Humphries 91.21	4
9	Dirk van Duijvenbode 100.43	6
29	Keane Barry 95.42	6
John Henderson 79.25	2
2	Michael Smith 103.96	6
26	Andrew Gilding 92.07	2
Josh Rock 93.47	6
11	Krzysztof Ratajski 94.86	4

Semi-finals (best of 13 legs)
9	Dirk van Duijvenbode 93.97	7
29	Keane Barry 91.02	1
2	Michael Smith 106.24	7
Josh Rock 103.51	3

Final (best of 15 legs)
9	Dirk van Duijvenbode 107.29	6
2	Michael Smith 105.58	8

=== Players Championship 17 ===
Players Championship 17 was contested on Wednesday 15 June 2022 at the H+ Hotel in Niedernhausen. The tournament was won by Scott Williams, who defeated Nathan Aspinall 8–5 in the final, becoming only the third player after Joe Murnan and Krzysztof Ratajski to win a Players Championship event without being a Tour Card holder.

Quarter-finals (best of 11 legs)
Mike De Decker 79.52	2
8	Nathan Aspinall 89.86	6
4	Peter Wright 86.44	0
21	Kim Huybrechts 107.36	6
18	Chris Dobey 99.70	6
7	Dirk van Duijvenbode 97.11	2
3	Rob Cross 101.75	4
Scott Williams 98.43	6

Semi-finals (best of 13 legs)
8	Nathan Aspinall 98.92	7
21	Kim Huybrechts 97.91	4
18	Chris Dobey 89.36	4
Scott Williams 86.08	7

Final (best of 15 legs)
8	Nathan Aspinall 86.50	5
Scott Williams 91.79	8

== July ==
=== Players Championship 18 ===
Players Championship 18 was contested on Friday 8 July 2022 at the Barnsley Metrodome. Dimitri Van den Bergh hit a nine-dart finish against Ryan Meikle. The tournament was won by Dirk van Duijvenbode, who whitewashed Gabriel Clemens 8–0 in the final.

Quarter-finals (best of 11 legs)
1	Luke Humphries 105.75	2
9	Dirk van Duijvenbode 105.44	6
29	Adrian Lewis 100.60	6
28	Andrew Gilding 91.40	2
18	Dave Chisnall 96.25	2
7	Nathan Aspinall 102.45	6
19	Daryl Gurney 85.01	3
27	Gabriel Clemens 101.20	6

Semi-finals (best of 13 legs)
9	Dirk van Duijvenbode 102.25	7
29	Adrian Lewis 95.22	4
7	Nathan Aspinall 94.39	6
27	Gabriel Clemens 92.09	7

Final (best of 15 legs)
9	Dirk van Duijvenbode 100.20	8
27	Gabriel Clemens 90.63	0

=== Players Championship 19 ===
Players Championship 19 was contested on Saturday 9 July 2022 at the Barnsley Metrodome. The tournament was won by Danny Noppert, who defeated Andrew Gilding 8–6 in the final.

Quarter-finals (best of 11 legs)
1	Luke Humphries 104.78	6
Jamie Hughes 100.51	3
29	Rowby-John Rodriguez 86.97	1
12	Danny Noppert 98.26	6
Niels Zonneveld 89.77	4
7	Ryan Searle 97.66	6
Lee Evans 80.08	1
27	Andrew Gilding 89.38	6

Semi-finals (best of 13 legs)
1	Luke Humphries 96.02	3
12	Danny Noppert 95.56	7
7	Ryan Searle 92.30	6
27	Andrew Gilding 94.52	7

Final (best of 15 legs)
12	Danny Noppert 96.86	8
27	Andrew Gilding 98.67	6

=== Players Championship 20 ===
Players Championship 20 was contested on Sunday 10 July 2022 at the Barnsley Metrodome. Nathan Rafferty hit a nine-dart finish against Dave Chisnall. The tournament was won by Adrian Lewis, who defeated Boris Koltsov 8–4 in the final.

Quarter-finals (best of 11 legs)
Krzysztof Kciuk 92.14	4
Boris Koltsov 91.92 (Note: Boris Koltsov, of Russia, has competed under a neutral designation since the 2022 Russian invasion of Ukraine.)	6
13	Martin Schindler 93.35	6
Steve Beaton 84.09	2
15	Jonny Clayton 96.98	4
26	Adrian Lewis 99.97	6
Jermaine Wattimena 92.75	5
6	Nathan Aspinall 91.32	6

Semi-finals (best of 13 legs)
Boris Koltsov 82.41	7
13	Martin Schindler 83.98	3
26	Adrian Lewis 98.89	7
6	Nathan Aspinall 94.10	2

Final (best of 15 legs)
Boris Koltsov 92.73	4
26	Adrian Lewis 103.02	8

=== Players Championship 21 ===
Players Championship 21 was contested on Monday 11 July 2022 at the Barnsley Metrodome. The tournament was won by Brendan Dolan, who defeated Jonny Clayton 8–5 in the final.

Quarter-finals (best of 11 legs)
Keegan Brown 87.84	3
25	Brendan Dolan 91.01	6
4	Damon Heta 95.59	6
Mensur Suljović 89.65	2
15	Dave Chisnall 103.35	6
7	Peter Wright 96.74	4
14	Jonny Clayton 102.67	6
6	Nathan Aspinall 97.29	3

Semi-finals (best of 13 legs)
25	Brendan Dolan 96.67	7
4	Damon Heta 98.22	4
15	Dave Chisnall 94.25	4
14	Jonny Clayton 99.62	7

Final (best of 15 legs)
25	Brendan Dolan 97.10	8
14	Jonny Clayton 95.52	5

== August ==
=== Players Championship 22 ===
Players Championship 22 was contested on Wednesday 3 August 2022 at the Barnsley Metrodome. José de Sousa and Rusty-Jake Rodriguez hit nine-dart finishes against Mervyn King and Dimitri Van den Bergh respectively. The tournament was won by Nathan Aspinall, who defeated Krzysztof Ratajski 8–3 in the final.

Quarter-finals (best of 11 legs)
1	Luke Humphries 102.76	2
8	Ryan Searle 107.28	6
20	Stephen Bunting 92.36	4
5	Nathan Aspinall 91.49	6
2	Michael Smith 98.13	4
10	Danny Noppert 95.34	6
14	Krzysztof Ratajski 97.05	6
11	Dimitri Van den Bergh 96.48	5

Semi-finals (best of 13 legs)
8	Ryan Searle 89.58	6
5	Nathan Aspinall 87.27	7
10	Danny Noppert 99.00	5
14	Krzysztof Ratajski 97.73	7

Final (best of 15 legs)
5	Nathan Aspinall 97.18	8
14	Krzysztof Ratajski 91.37	3

=== Players Championship 23 ===
Players Championship 23 was contested on Thursday 4 August 2022 at the Barnsley Metrodome. Jack Main hit a nine-dart finish against Rob Cross. The tournament was won by Keegan Brown, who defeated Nathan Aspinall 8–7 in the final.

Quarter-finals (best of 11 legs)
Alan Soutar 88.35	2
Ted Evetts 88.75	6
4	Nathan Aspinall 92.26	6
Shaun Wilkinson 83.34	1
2	Michael Smith 88.55	3
10	Peter Wright 101.57	6
Keegan Brown 91.17	6
22	Chris Dobey 88.56	4

Semi-finals (best of 13 legs)
Ted Evetts 88.35	6
4	Nathan Aspinall 89.17	7
10	Peter Wright 95.96	4
Keegan Brown 101.86	7

Final (best of 15 legs)
4	Nathan Aspinall 89.05	7
Keegan Brown 93.87	8

=== Players Championship 24 ===
Players Championship 24 was contested on Friday 5 August 2022 at the Barnsley Metrodome. Jack Main hit a nine-dart finish for the second event in a row, this one against Niels Zonneveld. The tournament was won by Rob Cross, who defeated Luke Humphries 8–3 in the final.

Quarter-finals (best of 11 legs)
1	Luke Humphries 100.29	6
9	Dimitri Van den Bergh 103.64	3
20	Madars Razma 84.85	5
12	Martin Schindler 86.51	6
18	Chris Dobey 88.45	6
26	Mensur Suljović 84.95	3
3	Rob Cross 91.02	6
11	José de Sousa 94.30	4

Semi-finals (best of 13 legs)
1	Luke Humphries 111.14	7
12	Martin Schindler 89.57	3
18	Chris Dobey 97.67	4
3	Rob Cross 109.49	7

Final (best of 15 legs)
1	Luke Humphries 97.41	3
3	Rob Cross 98.87	8

== October ==
=== Players Championship 25 ===
Players Championship 25 was contested on Thursday 20 October 2022 at the Barnsley Metrodome. The tournament was won by Dave Chisnall, who defeated Josh Rock 8–4 in the final.

Quarter-finals (best of 11 legs)
1	Luke Humphries 99.09	2
8	Dave Chisnall 114.62	6
13	Gerwyn Price 92.54	6
Mervyn King 97.04	4
Mike De Decker 113.74	2
26	Josh Rock 112.66	6
3	Damon Heta 101.60	6
Gian van Veen 96.12	1

Semi-finals (best of 13 legs)
8	Dave Chisnall 98.82	7
13	Gerwyn Price 97.20	6
26	Josh Rock 108.73	7
3	Damon Heta 102.78	3

Final (best of 15 legs)
8	Dave Chisnall 100.63	8
26	Josh Rock 97.14	4

=== Players Championship 26 ===
Players Championship 26 was contested on Friday 21 October 2022 at the Barnsley Metrodome. Jonny Clayton hit a nine-dart finish against Ryan Meikle. The tournament was won by Damon Heta, who defeated Dirk van Duijvenbode 8–4 in the final.

Quarter-finals (best of 11 legs)
Damian Mol 96.04	4
8	Dirk van Duijvenbode 94.72	6
Alan Soutar 88.85	1
Boris Krčmar 105.03	6
2	Damon Heta 104.73	6
Matt Campbell 98.18	3
3	Michael Smith 85.68	2
11	Gerwyn Price 94.00	6

Semi-finals (best of 13 legs)
8	Dirk van Duijvenbode 94.73	7
Boris Krčmar 86.22	2
2	Damon Heta 103.13	7
11	Gerwyn Price 101.64	3

Final (best of 15 legs)
8	Dirk van Duijvenbode 90.69	4
2	Damon Heta 103.52	8

=== Players Championship 27 ===
Players Championship 27 was contested on Saturday 22 October 2022 at the Barnsley Metrodome. Ryan Searle hit a nine-dart finish against Ryan Joyce. The tournament was won by Rob Cross, who defeated Peter Wright 8–4 in the final.

Quarter-finals (best of 11 legs)
32	Callan Rydz 109.48	6
Alan Soutar 97.13	1
4	Rob Cross 99.76	6
21	Stephen Bunting 92.14	2
15	José de Sousa 98.29	3
7	Peter Wright 101.78	6
Gary Anderson 97.52	4
Ryan Meikle 98.58	6

Semi-finals (best of 13 legs)
32	Callan Rydz 98.42	5
4	Rob Cross 110.90	7
7	Peter Wright 90.02	7
Ryan Meikle 86.81	2

Final (best of 15 legs)
4	Rob Cross 94.10	8
7	Peter Wright 96.63	4

=== Players Championship 28 ===
Players Championship 28 was contested on Sunday 23 October 2022 at the Barnsley Metrodome. The tournament was won by Josh Rock, who defeated Luke Humphries 8–5 in the final.

Quarter-finals (best of 11 legs)
1	Luke Humphries 102.21	6
Max Hopp 95.98	3
Ricardo Pietreczko 96.31	6
Ross Smith 88.49	1
2	Damon Heta 114.15	6
7	Dirk van Duijvenbode 91.83	0
19	Josh Rock 106.74	6
22	Adrian Lewis 88.56	1

Semi-finals (best of 13 legs)
1	Luke Humphries 96.86	7
Ricardo Pietreczko 85.42	2
2	Damon Heta 96.85	3
19	Josh Rock 102.06	7

Final (best of 15 legs)
1	Luke Humphries 102.96	5
19	Josh Rock 108.07	8

== November ==
=== Players Championship 29 ===
Players Championship 29 was contested on Friday 4 November 2022 at the Barnsley Metrodome. The tournament was won by Gerwyn Price, who defeated Gian van Veen 8–4 in the final.

Quarter-finals (best of 11 legs)
8	Dave Chisnall 115.57	6
Jermaine Wattimena 95.72	1
William O'Connor 94.22	2
Gian van Veen 100.66	6
15	Martin Schindler 90.19	0
10	Gerwyn Price 106.09	6
3	Rob Cross 97.91	4
Mike De Decker 97.21	6

Semi-finals (best of 13 legs)
8	Dave Chisnall 94.99	3
Gian van Veen 100.38	7
10	Gerwyn Price 95.85	7
Mike De Decker 95.57	4

Final (best of 15 legs)
Gian van Veen 94.37	4
10	Gerwyn Price 102.25	8

=== Players Championship 30 ===
Players Championship 30 was contested on Saturday 5 November 2022 at the Barnsley Metrodome. The tournament was won by James Wade, who defeated Steve Beaton 8–6 in the final.

Quarter-finals (best of 11 legs)
16	Stephen Bunting 92.91	4
Steve Beaton 102.99	6
13	Josh Rock 103.59	5
5	Dave Chisnall 104.77	6
Jermaine Wattimena 93.51	5
26	James Wade 89.63	6
Connor Scutt 93.95	5
11	Martin Schindler 94.02	6

Semi-finals (best of 13 legs)
Steve Beaton 94.91	7
5	Dave Chisnall 93.45	4
26	James Wade 98.37	7
11	Martin Schindler 91.81	4

Final (best of 15 legs)
Steve Beaton 93.99	6
26	James Wade 94.82	8

== Players Championship Order of Merit ==
The top 64 players from the Players Championship Order of Merit, which was solely based on prize money won in the thirty Players Championship events during the season, qualified for the 2022 Players Championship Finals, held in November.

Prize money in the tables is in units of £1,000.

Rank	Player	Prize money	Rank	Player	Prize money
1	Damon Heta	82.75	33	Madars Razma	27.75
2	Luke Humphries	71.25	34	Mike De Decker	27.5
3	Nathan Aspinall	68.5	35	Steve Beaton	26.5
4	Dirk van Duijvenbode	67.75	36	Keegan Brown	26.5
5	Rob Cross	66.5	37	Gary Anderson	26.25
6	Michael Smith	65.75	38	Martin Lukeman	25.5
7	Dave Chisnall	61.5	39	Alan Soutar	25
8	Gerwyn Price	56.25	40	Jermaine Wattimena	24.5
9	Peter Wright	55.75	41	John O'Shea	24.5
10	Joe Cullen	51.5	42	Raymond van Barneveld	24.25
11	Josh Rock	50.5	43	Ryan Meikle	23.75
12	Martin Schindler	47.25	44	Geert Nentjes	23.5
13	Ryan Searle	46.5	45	Jamie Hughes	23.25
14	Danny Noppert	44.5	46	Mensur Suljović	23.25
15	Krzysztof Ratajski	41.75	47	Danny Jansen	22.75
16	Andrew Gilding	40.5	48	Keane Barry	22.75
17	Adrian Lewis	38.25	49	Ricky Evans	22.5
18	José de Sousa	37.25	50	William O'Connor	22
19	James Wade	37	51	Simon Whitlock	22
20	Stephen Bunting	37	52	Mervyn King	22
21	Chris Dobey	37	53	Vincent van der Voort	21.5
22	Michael van Gerwen	36.25	54	Cameron Menzies	20.75
23	Kim Huybrechts	35.25	55	Rowby-John Rodriguez	20.75
24	Jonny Clayton	34.75	56	Ross Smith	20.5
25	Brendan Dolan	34.5	57	Ryan Joyce	20.5
26	Scott Williams	33	58	Niels Zonneveld	20.25
27	Dimitri Van den Bergh	33	59	Ritchie Edhouse	20
28	Gabriel Clemens	31.75	60	Kevin Doets	20
29	Daryl Gurney	30	61	Mickey Mansell	18.75
30	Matt Campbell	29.25	62	Martijn Kleermaker	18.75
31	Jim Williams	28.75	63	Nathan Rafferty	18.25
32	Callan Rydz	27.75	64	Ricardo Pietreczko	18

== Top averages ==
The table lists all players who achieved a three-dart average of at least 110 in a match. In the case one player has multiple records, this is indicated by the number in brackets.

#	Player	Round	Average	Event	Result	Ref
1	Josh Rock	2	121.88	22	Won	
2	Andrew Gilding	1	118.33	18	Won	
3	Damon Heta	2	115.97	15	Won	
4	Luke Humphries	1	115.62	12	Won	
5	Martin Schindler	2	115.62	25	Won	
6	Dave Chisnall	Quarter-Final	115.57	29	Won	
7	Ryan Searle	Quarter-Final	115.02	1	Won	
8	Michael Smith	Quarter-Final	114.90	15	Won	
9	Gerwyn Price	2	114.75	4	Won	
10	Dave Chisnall (2)	Quarter-Final	114.32	25	Won	
11	Gabriel Clemens	2	114.15	18	Won	
12	Damon Heta (2)	Quarter-Final	114.15	28	Won	
13	Mike De Decker	Quarter-Final	113.74	8	Lost	
14	Michael Smith (2)	3	113.54	23	Won	
15	Gary Anderson	Quarter-Final	113.45	5	Won	
16	Rob Cross	3	113.29	29	Won	
17	Stephen Bunting	1	113.27	29	Won	
18	Adrian Lewis	1	113.12	13	Lost	
19	Damon Heta (3)	1	112.73	6	Won	
20	Josh Rock (2)	Quarter-Final	112.66	25	Won	
21	Josh Rock (3)	1	112.34	13	Won	
22	Gerwyn Price (2)	3	111.84	29	Won	
23	Andrew Gilding (2)	2	111.52	18	Won	
24	Peter Wright	3	111.46	10	Won	
25	Jonny Clayton	1	111.33	17	Won	
26	Luke Humphries (2)	Semi-Final	111.14	24	Won	
27	Gary Anderson (2)	1	111.13	23	Won	
28	Martin Schindler (2)	1	111.08	5	Won	
29	Damon Heta (4)	2	111.00	28	Won	
30	Gerwyn Price (3)	2	110.95	8	Won	
31	Rob Cross (2)	Semi-Final	110.90	27	Won	
32	Mickey Mansell	2	110.58	24	Won	
33	Luke Humphries (3)	1	110.49	28	Won	
34	Steve Beaton	2	110.41	24	Won	
35	Mike De Decker (2)	3	110.33	30	Won	
36	Josh Rock (4)	2	110.28	29	Won	
37	Josh Rock (5)	3	110.15	25	Won	
38	Jules van Dongen	1	110.00	25	Won	
