= 2022 PDC Development Tour =

The 2022 PDC Development Tour consists of 24 darts tournaments on the 2022 PDC Pro Tour.

== Prize money ==
The prize money for the PDC Development Tour remained the same from 2021, with each event having a prize fund of £10,000.

This is how the prize money is divided:

Stage (no. of players)		Prize money (Total: £10,000)
Winner	(1)	£2,000
Runner-up	(1)	£1,000
Semi-finalists	(2)	£500
Quarter-finalists	(4)	£300
Last 16	(8)	£200
Last 32	(16)	£100
Last 64	(32)	£50

== February ==
=== Development Tour 1 ===
Development Tour 1 was contested on Friday 18 February 2022 at the Robin Park Sports Centre in Wigan. The tournament was won by Bradley Brooks.

Quarter-finals (best of 9 legs)
Bradley Brooks 89.92	5
Jacob Gwynne 81.76	2
Sebastian Białecki 95.68	5
Justin Hewitt 81.15	4
Nathan Rafferty 97.03	5
Niels Zonneveld 85.64	2
Christopher Holt 83.58	5
Jurjen van der Velde 88.40	3

Semi-finals (best of 9 legs)
Bradley Brooks 91.31	5
Sebastian Białecki 95.70	4
Nathan Rafferty 88.79	4
Christopher Holt 82.81	5

Final (best of 9 legs)
Bradley Brooks 88.57	5
Christopher Holt 76.30	1

=== Development Tour 2 ===
Development Tour 2 was contested on Friday 18 February 2022 at the Robin Park Sports Centre in Wigan. The tournament was won by Keane Barry.

Quarter-finals (best of 9 legs)
Keane Barry 96.35	5
Dom Taylor 92.88	0
Jarred Cole 100.32	5
Dylan Slevin 89.88	2
Jurjen van der Velde 89.70	5
Tomáš Houdek 80.23	1
Conor Heneghan 92.06	5
Niels Zonneveld 95.32	4

Semi-finals (best of 9 legs)
Keane Barry 108.14	5
Jarred Cole 89.59	1
Jurjen van der Velde 85.66	3
Conor Heneghan 99.36	5

Final (best of 9 legs)
Keane Barry 93.14	5
Conor Heneghan 85.85	4

=== Development Tour 3 ===
Development Tour 3 was contested on Saturday 19 February 2022 at the Robin Park Sports Centre in Wigan. The tournament was won by Josh Rock.

Quarter-finals (best of 9 legs)
Adam Gawlas 92.55	5
Keelan Kay 88.09	4
Lewy Williams 98.73	5
Bradley Brooks 96.73	2
Keenan Thomas 90.94	5
Nathan Rafferty 92.90	3
Josh Rock 91.35	5
Tomáš Houdek 88.50	2

Semi-finals (best of 9 legs)
Adam Gawlas 78.77	3
Lewy Williams 83.64	5
Keenan Thomas 84.64	3
Josh Rock 90.74	5

Final (best of 9 legs)
Lewy Williams 97.06	4
Josh Rock 94.57	5

=== Development Tour 4 ===
Development Tour 4 was contested on Saturday 19 February 2022 at the Robin Park Sports Centre in Wigan. The tournament was won by Kevin Doets.

Quarter-finals (best of 9 legs)
Nathan Girvan 89.10	5
Keane Barry 84.57	1
Josh Rock 93.92	5
Niels Zonneveld 87.30	1
Kevin Doets 100.51	5
Lewy Williams 94.26	3
Jarred Cole 93.68	5
Bradley Brooks 89.04	3

Semi-finals (best of 9 legs)
Nathan Girvan 102.03	4
Josh Rock 100.49	5
Kevin Doets 95.84	5
Jarred Cole 83.95	3

Final (best of 9 legs)
Josh Rock 93.29	3
Kevin Doets 95.06	5

=== Development Tour 5 ===
Development Tour 5 was contested on Sunday 20 February 2022 at the Robin Park Sports Centre in Wigan. The tournament was won by Josh Rock.

Quarter-finals (best of 9 legs)
Kevin Doets 86.39	5
Alec Small 83.36	4
Nathan Girvan 91.53	5
Owen Roelofs 85.28	2
Josh Rock 91.65	5
Fabian Schmutzler 81.04	0
Bradley Brooks 86.28	5
Oliver King 77.58	2

Semi-finals (best of 9 legs)
Kevin Doets 90.61	4
Nathan Girvan 88.41	5
Josh Rock 93.24	5
Bradley Brooks 83.90	3

Final (best of 9 legs)
Nathan Girvan 93.66	3
Josh Rock 94.14	5

== May ==
=== Development Tour 6 ===
Development Tour 6 was contested on Friday 6 May 2022 at the Robin Park Sports Centre in Wigan. The tournament was won by Nathan Rafferty.

Quarter-finals (best of 9 legs)
Geert Nentjes 97.60	5
Jurjen van der Velde 91.32	2
Lewy Williams 92.70	5
Nathan Girvan 86.69	2
Jarred Cole 83.72	5
Christopher Holt 77.02	2
Rusty-Jake Rodriguez 89.19	3
Nathan Rafferty 84.40	5

Semi-finals (best of 9 legs)
Geert Nentjes 95.89	4
Lewy Williams 92.27	5
Jarred Cole 82.55	1
Nathan Rafferty 92.47	5

Final (best of 9 legs)
Lewy Williams 90.18	4
Nathan Rafferty 88.83	5

=== Development Tour 7 ===
Development Tour 7 was contested on Friday 6 May 2022 at the Robin Park Sports Centre in Wigan. The tournament was won by Jurjen van der Velde.

Quarter-finals (best of 9 legs)
Geert Nentjes 92.00	5
Rusty-Jake Rodriguez 88.63	3
Lewy Williams 82.38	3
Nathan Rafferty 84.92	5
Jurjen van der Velde 94.61	5
Dylan Slevin 88.98	2
Justin van Tergouw 86.90	5
Maikel Verberk 82.82	2

Semi-finals (best of 9 legs)
Geert Nentjes 91.73	5
Nathan Rafferty 86.03	4
Jurjen van der Velde 83.25	5
Justin van Tergouw 75.23	2

Final (best of 9 legs)
Geert Nentjes 81.03	1
Jurjen van der Velde 81.28	5

=== Development Tour 8 ===
Development Tour 8 was contested on Saturday 7 May 2022 at the Robin Park Sports Centre in Wigan. The tournament was won by Conor Heneghan.

Quarter-finals (best of 9 legs)
Bram van Dijk 69.36	3
Jitse van der Wal 76.01	5
Geert Nentjes 79.01	3
Sebastian Białecki 86.64	5
Conor Heneghan 90.54	5
Charlie Manby 78.68	0
Killian Heffernan 92.54	4
Rusty-Jake Rodriguez 87.10	5

Semi-finals (best of 9 legs)
Jitse van der Wal 79.89	5
Sebastian Białecki 83.15	3
Conor Heneghan 81.74	5
Rusty-Jake Rodriguez 79.11	3

Final (best of 9 legs)
Jitse van der Wal 85.52	1
Conor Heneghan 87.78	5

=== Development Tour 9 ===
Development Tour 9 was contested on Saturday 7 May 2022 at the Robin Park Sports Centre in Wigan. The tournament was won by Nathan Girvan.

Quarter-finals (best of 9 legs)
Adam Gawlas 76.16	0
Nathan Girvan 93.94	5
John Brown 54.74	0
Keelan Kay 77.47	5
Nathan Rafferty 85.11	5
Dom Taylor 81.06	4
Bradley Brooks 81.08	3
Gergely Lakatos 77.77	5

Semi-finals (best of 9 legs)
Nathan Girvan 79.79	5
Keelan Kay 79.68	3
Nathan Rafferty 91.71	5
Gergely Lakatos 84.24	4

Final (best of 9 legs)
Nathan Girvan 99.21	5
Nathan Rafferty 85.06	2

=== Development Tour 10 ===
Development Tour 10 was contested on Sunday 8 May 2022 at the Robin Park Sports Centre in Wigan. Kevin Doets hit a nine-dart finish against Wesley Veenstra. The tournament was won by Geert Nentjes.

Quarter-finals (best of 9 legs)
Craig Galliano 75.75	5
Nathan Girvan 79.77	4
Jitse van der Wal 86.87	5
Dom Taylor 82.53	2
Lewy Williams 84.12	3
Geert Nentjes 89.81	5
Gian van Veen 89.92	5
Fabian Schmutzler 94.10	2

Semi-finals (best of 9 legs)
Craig Galliano 76.38	1
Jitse van der Wal 85.99	5
Geert Nentjes 94.36	5
Gian van Veen 79.52	1

Final (best of 9 legs)
Jitse van der Wal 73.11	1
Geert Nentjes 90.09	5

== June ==
=== Development Tour 11 ===
Development Tour 11 was contested on Friday 3 June 2022 at the Halle 39 in Hildesheim. The tournament was won by Nathan Rafferty.

Quarter-finals (best of 9 legs)
Jack Vincent 74.41	1
Keane Barry 86.65	5
Lewy Williams 90.91	3
Nathan Rafferty 92.07	5
Gian van Veen 94.22	5
Cavan Phillips 86.44	2
Danny Jansen 84.82	3
Jurjen van der Velde 83.50	5

Semi-finals (best of 9 legs)
Keane Barry 95.26	3
Nathan Rafferty 93.79	5
Gian van Veen 91.37	5
Jurjen van der Velde 91.49	3

Final (best of 9 legs)
Nathan Rafferty 96.17	5
Gian van Veen 92.53	4

=== Development Tour 12 ===
Development Tour 12 was contested on Friday 3 June 2022 at the Halle 39 in Hildesheim. The tournament was won by Keane Barry.

Quarter-finals (best of 9 legs)
Keane Barry 101.16	5
Lewy Williams 82.27	1
Dylan Slevin 89.22	5
Maikel Mossou 82.42	1
Alec Small 79.11	2
Ciarán Teehan 82.75	5
Jurjen van der Velde 70.86	0
Jarred Cole 87.38	5

Semi-finals (best of 9 legs)
Keane Barry 87.39	5
Dylan Slevin 86.36	3
Ciarán Teehan 81.38	5
Jarred Cole 81.64	3

Final (best of 9 legs)
Keane Barry 93.94	5
Ciarán Teehan 81.16	0

=== Development Tour 13 ===
Development Tour 13 was contested on Saturday 4 June 2022 at the Halle 39 in Hildesheim. The tournament was won by Geert Nentjes.

Quarter-finals (best of 9 legs)
Lewy Williams 88.51	4
Jarred Cole 90.63	5
Bradley Brooks 97.21	3
Geert Nentjes 98.59	5
Jurjen van der Velde 95.42	5
Lewis Gurney 82.54	2
Niko Springer 88.98	5
David Schlichting 84.38	1

Semi-finals (best of 9 legs)
Jarred Cole 85.46	2
Geert Nentjes 86.28	5
Jurjen van der Velde 86.20	4
Niko Springer 81.34	5

Final (best of 9 legs)
Geert Nentjes 91.41	5
Niko Springer 85.17	1

=== Development Tour 14 ===
Development Tour 14 was contested on Saturday 4 June 2022 at the Halle 39 in Hildesheim. Jurjen van der Velde hit a nine-dart finish against Mark Tabak. The tournament was won by Sebastian Białecki.

Quarter-finals (best of 9 legs)
Jarred Cole 88.86	2
Sebastian Białecki 97.95	5
Bradley Brooks 86.58	5
Geert Nentjes 84.74	2
Josh Rock 96.84	2
Nathan Rafferty 103.12	5
Daan Bastiaansen 75.71	2
Keane Barry 88.21	5

Semi-finals (best of 9 legs)
Sebastian Białecki 93.94	5
Bradley Brooks 83.85	0
Nathan Rafferty 83.12	0
Keane Barry 90.54	5

Final (best of 9 legs)
Sebastian Białecki 92.71	5
Keane Barry 84.80	3

=== Development Tour 15 ===
Development Tour 15 was contested on Sunday 5 June 2022 at the Halle 39 in Hildesheim. The tournament was won by Keane Barry, who defeated Owen Bates 5–3 in the final.

Quarter-finals (best of 9 legs)
Conor Heneghan 76.48	4
Cam Crabtree 77.50	5
Lewy Williams 80.02	3
Keane Barry 83.21	5
Owen Bates 83.06	5
Christopher Holt 77.39	3
Geert Nentjes 90.14	2
Owen Roelofs 95.20	5

Semi-finals (best of 9 legs)
Cam Crabtree 82.13	2
Keane Barry 89.50	5
Owen Bates 84.37	5
Owen Roelofs 75.73	1

Final (best of 9 legs)
Keane Barry 95.85	5
Owen Bates 91.01	3

== August ==
=== Development Tour 16 ===
Development Tour 16 was contested on Friday 19 August 2022 at the Halle 39 in Hildesheim. The tournament was won by Josh Rock.

Quarter-finals (best of 9 legs)
Jitse van der Wal 85.14	2
Josh Rock 92.20	5
Lewy Williams 78.87	2
Sebastian Białecki 82.24	5
Conor Heneghan 94.93	5
Nathan Girvan 84.40	2
Dylan Dowling 94.58	5
Owen Bates 88.05	3

Semi-finals (best of 9 legs)
Josh Rock 102.95	5
Sebastian Białecki 86.50	0
Conor Heneghan 77.88	4
Dylan Dowling 77.66	5

Final (best of 9 legs)
Josh Rock 112.16	5
Dylan Dowling 85.38	0

=== Development Tour 17 ===
Development Tour 17 was contested on Friday 19 August 2022 at the Halle 39 in Hildesheim. The tournament was won by Josh Rock.

Quarter-finals (best of 9 legs)
Nathan Girvan 88.49	5
Geert Nentjes 80.16	2
Christopher Holt 83.90	5
Ole Holtkamp 86.01	4
Daniel Perry 92.35	5
Daan Bastiaansen 73.69	1
Josh Rock 103.82	5
Sebastian Białecki 94.23	4

Semi-finals (best of 9 legs)
Nathan Girvan 83.92	5
Christopher Holt 79.66	4
Daniel Perry 92.55	3
Josh Rock 98.22	5

Final (best of 9 legs)
Nathan Girvan 79.14	0
Josh Rock 104.38	5

=== Development Tour 18 ===
Development Tour 18 was contested on Saturday 20 August 2022 at the Halle 39 in Hildesheim. The tournament was won by Gian van Veen.

Quarter-finals (best of 9 legs)
Dylan Slevin 81.62	0
Adam Gawlas 89.46	5
Keane Barry 84.03	1
Josh Rock 96.13	5
Robbe Dasseville 72.00	1
Owen Roelofs 81.30	5
Gian van Veen 92.96	5
Kevin Doets 90.20	4

Semi-finals (best of 9 legs)
Adam Gawlas 83.26	2
Josh Rock 90.64	5
Owen Roelofs 84.77	3
Gian van Veen 87.25	5

Final (best of 9 legs)
Josh Rock 95.30	4
Gian van Veen 95.93	5

=== Development Tour 19 ===
Development Tour 19 was contested on Saturday 20 August 2022 at the Halle 39 in Hildesheim. The tournament was won by Lewy Williams.

Quarter-finals (best of 9 legs)
Josh Rock 95.19	2
Keane Barry 98.91	5
Kevin Doets 89.84	5
Vinay Ramnath 80.82	2
Zac Griffiths 78.75	4
Daniel Perry 74.71	5
Lewy Williams 89.46	5
Robin Beger 87.62	0

Semi-finals (best of 9 legs)
Keane Barry 92.91	4
Kevin Doets 98.24	5
Daniel Perry 83.00	1
Lewy Williams 89.85	5

Final (best of 9 legs)
Kevin Doets 89.48	4
Lewy Williams 86.47	5

=== Development Tour 20 ===
Development Tour 20 is to be contested on Sunday 21 August 2022 at the Halle 39 in Hildesheim. The tournament was won by Nathan Rafferty.

Quarter-finals (best of 9 legs)
Geert Nentjes 93.78	5
Ciarán Teehan 93.92	4
Nathan Rafferty 85.29	5
Lewis Gurney 80.73	3
Ole Holtkamp 70.71	2
Kevin Doets 77.06	5
Jurjen van der Velde 87.88	3
Lewy Williams 90.85	5

Semi-finals (best of 9 legs)
Geert Nentjes 89.09	4
Nathan Rafferty 92.42	5
Kevin Doets 80.11	5
Lewy Williams 81.08	3

Final (best of 9 legs)
Nathan Rafferty 84.66	5
Kevin Doets 86.10	2

== October ==
=== Development Tour 21 ===
Development Tour 21 was contested on Friday 7 October 2022 at the Robin Park Sports Centre in Wigan. The tournament was won by Josh Rock.

Quarter-finals (best of 9 legs)
Bradley Brooks 95.12	5
Daniel Perry 87.75	0
Nathan Girvan 96.39	2
Rusty-Jake Rodriguez 96.37	5
Gian van Veen 98.96	1
Dylan Slevin 95.59	5
Josh Rock 98.91	5
Joshua Richardson 88.28	4

Semi-finals (best of 9 legs)
Bradley Brooks 82.88	3
Rusty-Jake Rodriguez 92.14	5
Dylan Slevin 95.88	1
Josh Rock 104.38	5

Final (best of 9 legs)
Rusty-Jake Rodriguez 86.02	2
Josh Rock 95.85	5

=== Development Tour 22 ===
Development Tour 22 was contested on Friday 7 October 2022 at the Robin Park Sports Centre in Wigan. The tournament was won by Nathan Rafferty.

Quarter-finals (best of 9 legs)
Gian van Veen 92.07	2
Josh Rock 91.12	5
Nathan Rafferty 91.83	5
Rusty-Jake Rodriguez 85.91	1
Robin Beger 91.23	5
Connor Hopkins 87.42	2
Dom Taylor 86.35	4
Niko Springer 82.79	5

Semi-finals (best of 9 legs)
Josh Rock 93.19	2
Nathan Rafferty 106.21	5
Robin Beger 99.94	3
Niko Springer 92.82	5

Final (best of 9 legs)
Nathan Rafferty 97.82	5
Niko Springer 93.47	3

=== Development Tour 23 ===
Development Tour 23 was contested on Saturday 8 October 2022 at the Robin Park Sports Centre in Wigan. The tournament was won by Nathan Rafferty.

Quarter-finals (best of 9 legs)
Lewy Williams 86.64	5
Nathan Girvan 81.50	3
Brandon Weening 87.99	5
Owen Bates 84.91	3
Nathan Rafferty 95.34	5
Daniel Perry 94.39	3
Sebastian Białecki 88.97	5
Jitse van der Wal 82.16	3

Semi-finals (best of 9 legs)
Lewy Williams 91.41	5
Brandon Weening 85.60	4
Nathan Rafferty 94.60	5
Sebastian Białecki 87.76	4

Final (best of 9 legs)
Lewy Williams 87.83	2
Nathan Rafferty 91.57	5

=== Development Tour 24 ===
Development Tour 24 was contested on Saturday 8 October 2022 at the Robin Park Sports Centre in Wigan. The tournament was won by Joshua Richardson.

Quarter-finals (best of 9 legs)
Joshua Richardson 82.77	5
Adam Gawlas 82.68	2
Thomas Banks 86.10	5
Nathan Rafferty 87.24	4
Owen Maiden 81.20	5
Man Lok Leung 81.53	3
Jurjen van der Velde 89.33	5
Brandon Weening 79.42	3

Semi-finals (best of 9 legs)
Joshua Richardson 87.12	5
Thomas Banks 80.66	2
Jurjen van der Velde 82.52	5
Owen Maiden 75.59	3

Final (best of 9 legs)
Joshua Richardson 81.76	5
Jurjen van der Velde 86.70	4
