= 2024 PDC Development Tour =

International darts tournament

The 2024 PDC Development Tour (known for sponsorship reasons as the Winmau Development Tour) was a series of non-televised darts tournaments organised by the Professional Darts Corporation (PDC). A secondary tour to the PDC Pro Tour, it consisted of 24 tournaments, held over four weekends of five events and one weekend of four events.

The 2024 Development Tour was the PDC's youth system open to all players outside of the top 32 on the PDC Order of Merit that were aged 16–24.

2024 Development Tour ranking
Rank	Player	Earnings
1	Wessel Nijman (Note: Qualified for 2025 PDC World Darts Championship via another method.) (Note: Qualified for 2025 Tour Card via another method)	£25,125
2	Niko Springer	£15,425
3	Keane Barry	£13,475
4	Nathan Rafferty	£12,275
5	Sebastian Białecki	£9,700
6	Gian van Veen	£9,350
7	Danny Jansen	£8,275
8	Beau Greaves	£6,950
9	Jurjen van der Velde	£5,750
10	Dominik Grüllich	£5,675

== Prize money ==
This is how the prize money is divided:

Stage (no. of players)		Prize money (Total: £100,000)
Winner	(1)	£2,500
Runner-up	(1)	£1,000
Semi-finalists	(2)	£750
Quarter-finalists	(4)	£500
Fourth round	(8)	£300
Third round	(16)	£200
Second round	(32)	£75

== February ==
=== Development Tour 1 ===
Development Tour 1 was contested on 23 February 2024. The tournament was won by Danny Jansen who defeated Owen Roelofs 5–4 in the final.

Quarter-finals (best of 9 legs)
Daniel Perry 79.48	5
Rusty-Jake Rodriguez 83.96	3
Danny Jansen 99.06	5
Paul Krohne 92.59	2
Nathan Rafferty 86.63	4
Owen Roelofs 93.54	5
Keane Barry 83.98	3
James Beeton 87.27	5

Semi-finals (best of 9 legs)
Daniel Perry 88.06	3
Danny Jansen 92.02	5
Owen Roelofs 95.68	5
James Beeton 89.41	2

Final (best of 9 legs)
Danny Jansen 99.28	5
Owen Roelofs 97.84	4

=== Development Tour 2 ===
Development Tour 2 was contested on 23 February 2024. The tournament was won by Keane Barry who defeated Gian van Veen 5–4 in the final.

Quarter-finals (best of 9 legs)
Llew Bevan 93.65	5
Dylan Dowling 90.49	1
Dominik Grüllich 86.21	2
Gian van Veen 84.43	5
Keane Barry 84.44	5
Ondrej Frystacky 68.82	0
Beau Greaves 89.50	4
Bailey White 85.14	5

Semi-finals (best of 9 legs)
Llew Bevan 85.60	1
Gian van Veen 90.00	5
Keane Barry 95.41	5
Bailey White 88.87	1

Final (best of 9 legs)
Gian van Veen 96.57	4
Keane Barry 90.94	5

=== Development Tour 3 ===
Development Tour 3 was contested on 24 February 2024. The tournament was won by Keane Barry, who defeated Sebastian Białecki 5–0 in the final.

Quarter-finals (best of 9 legs)
Lennon Cradock 93.22	5
Gian van Veen 99.28	3
Owen Maiden 81.53	1
Keane Barry 88.22	5
Wessel Nijman 101.51	5
Beau Greaves 92.29	4
Harry Gregory 87.46	0
Sebastian Białecki 90.54	5

Semi-finals (best of 9 legs)
Lennon Cradock 75.96	0
Keane Barry 87.38	5
Wessel Nijman 97.57	4
Sebastian Białecki 91.70	5

Final (best of 9 legs)
Keane Barry 90.54	5
Sebastian Białecki 87.54	0

=== Development Tour 4 ===
Development Tour 4 was contested on 24 February 2024. The tournament was won by Jurjen van der Velde who defeated Leighton Bennett 5–0 in the final.

Quarter-finals (best of 9 legs)
Kieran Thompson 75.09	2
Lloyd Walker 72.97	5
Jurjen van der Velde 87.49	5
Nathan Girvan 85.37	1
Keane Barry 84.65	4
Sebastian Białecki 88.19	5
Leighton Bennett 94.52	5
Dominik Grüllich 88.48	1

Semi-finals (best of 9 legs)
Lloyd Walker 75.50	0
Jurjen van der Velde 88.41	5
Sebastian Białecki 86.48	1
Leighton Bennett 86.81	5

Final (best of 9 legs)
Jurjen van der Velde 86.38	5
Leighton Bennett 76.76	0

=== Development Tour 5 ===
Development Tour 5 was contested on 25 February 2024. The tournament was won by Gian van Veen, who defeated Dylan Slevin 5–0 in the final.

Quarter-finals (best of 9 legs)
Dylan Slevin 81.84	5
Moreno Blom 81.59	2
Nathan Potter 84.38	4
Daniel Stephenson 92.89	5
Cam Crabtree 82.18	5
Bradly Roes 80.82	4
Wessel Nijman 90.03	1
Gian van Veen 92.75	5

Semi-finals (best of 9 legs)
Dylan Slevin 92.54	5
Daniel Stephenson 82.14	2
Cam Crabtree 82.42	0
Gian van Veen 100.20	5

Final (best of 9 legs)
Dylan Slevin 79.14	0
Gian van Veen 87.38	5

== May ==
=== Development Tour 6 ===
Development Tour 6 was contested on 3 May 2024. The tournament was won by Roman Benecký, who defeated Thomas Banks 5–4 in the final.

Quarter-finals (best of 9 legs)
Roman Benecký 88.21	5
Dylan Dowling 86.15	2
Gian van Veen 105.60	5
Finn Prokop 84.57	1
Thomas Banks 101.79	5
Viktor Tingström 101.06	2
Roy Rietbergen 91.48	5
Cam Crabtree 82.18	1

Semi-finals (best of 9 legs)
Roman Benecký 82.25	5
Gian van Veen 91.34	3
Thomas Banks 87.10	5
Roy Rietbergen 79.79	2

Final (best of 9 legs)
Roman Benecký 85.23	5
Thomas Banks 89.78	4

=== Development Tour 7 ===
Development Tour 7 was contested on 3 May 2024. The tournament was won by Gian van Veen who defeated Nathan Rafferty 5–1 in the final.

Quarter-finals (best of 9 legs)
Revelino Dubois 81.43	4
Nathan Rafferty 84.25	5
Bailey White 80.06	2
Harry Gregory 92.55	5
Ieuan Halsall 70.34	2
Jimmy Bristow 80.70	5
Gian van Veen 95.43	5
Owen Roelofs 77.67	1

Semi-finals (best of 9 legs)
Nathan Rafferty 93.94	5
Harry Gregory 83.40	0
Jimmy Bristow 81.96	3
Gian van Veen 89.04	5

Final (best of 9 legs)
Nathan Rafferty 87.19	1
Gian van Veen 93.69	5

=== Development Tour 8 ===
Development Tour 8 was contested on 4 May 2024. The tournament was won by Wessel Nijman.

Quarter-finals (best of 9 legs)
Wessel Nijman 99.30	5
Gian van Veen 98.16	4
Colinn Haverkate 68.53	0
Danny Jansen 75.91	5
Daniel Perry 82.50	3
Niko Springer 88.70	5
Marvin van Velzen 81.84	5
Angelo Balsamo 81.42	3

Semi-finals (best of 9 legs)
Wessel Nijman 89.09	5
Danny Jansen 86.72	4
Niko Springer 89.93	5
Marvin van Velzen 86.71	3

Final (best of 9 legs)
Wessel Nijman 113.03	5
Niko Springer 95.39	4

=== Development Tour 9 ===
Development Tour 9 was contested on 4 May 2024. The tournament was won by Nathan Rafferty.

Quarter-finals (best of 9 legs)
Wessel Nijman 94.68	5
Sebastian Białecki 86.50	3
David Fidler 73.96	0
Danny Jansen 95.13	5
Nathan Rafferty 85.27	5
Jarred Cole 86.38	2
Mason Whitlock 77.58	2
Nathan Potter 81.80	5

Semi-finals (best of 9 legs)
Wessel Nijman 89.91	4
Danny Jansen 94.67	5
Nathan Rafferty 77.47	5
Nathan Potter 77.80	0

Final (best of 9 legs)
Danny Jansen 81.03	2
Nathan Rafferty 89.97	5

=== Development Tour 10 ===
Development Tour 10 was contested on 5 May 2024. The tournament was won by Niko Springer.

Quarter-finals (best of 9 legs)
Danny Jansen 81.84	0
Keane Barry 101.55	5
Charlie Manby 91.44	3
Gian van Veen 91.76	5
Niko Springer 95.46	5
Henry Coates 81.42	2
Adam Gawlas 72.49	2
Jannis Barkhausen 77.16	5

Semi-finals (best of 9 legs)
Keane Barry 91.81	3
Gian van Veen 92.83	5
Niko Springer 87.41	5
Jannis Barkhausen 87.27	2

Final (best of 9 legs)
Gian van Veen 98.01	2
Niko Springer 91.83	5

== June ==
=== Development Tour 11 ===
Development Tour 11 was contested on 21 June 2024. The tournament was won by Beau Greaves, who became the first woman to win a Development Tour title.

Quarter-finals (best of 9 legs)
Sebastian Białecki 95.63	1
Dylan Dowling 97.09	5
Daniel Perry 82.79	5
Keane Barry 83.72	4
Owen Maiden 83.30	1
Beau Greaves 102.27	5
Henry Coates 75.77	0
Niko Springer 91.65	5

Semi-finals (best of 9 legs)
Dylan Dowling 82.10	2
Daniel Perry 99.06	5
Beau Greaves 92.78	5
Niko Springer 84.63	0

Final (best of 9 legs)
Daniel Perry 74.20	2
Beau Greaves 87.44	5

=== Development Tour 12 ===
Development Tour 12 was contested on 21 June 2024. The tournament was won by Keane Barry.

Quarter-finals (best of 9 legs)
Wessel Nijman 102.95	5
Sascha Stuhlemmer 84.70	0
Keane Barry 86.94	5
Leighton Bennett 88.33	1
Beau Greaves 90.44	2
Viktor Tingström 93.78	5
Angelo Balsamo 82.51	5
Nathan Potter 76.03	2

Semi-finals (best of 9 legs)
Wessel Nijman 98.78	2
Keane Barry 104.09	5
Viktor Tingström 90.32	4
Angelo Balsamo 91.42	5

Final (best of 9 legs)
Keane Barry 92.22	5
Angelo Balsamo 82.03	2

=== Development Tour 13 ===
Development Tour 13 was contested on 22 June 2024. The tournament was won by Wessel Nijman.

Quarter-finals (best of 9 legs)
Nathan Rafferty 81.43	5
Christopher Toonders 79.49	2
Wessel Nijman 102.95	5
Beau Greaves 84.26	0
Niko Springer 83.55	5
Nathan Girvan 83.23	4
Charlie Manby 75.55	0
Keanu van Velzen 77.47	5

Semi-finals (best of 9 legs)
Nathan Rafferty 91.64	4
Wessel Nijman 96.80	5
Niko Springer 84.44	5
Keanu van Velzen 77.00	0

Final (best of 9 legs)
Wessel Nijman 88.95	5
Niko Springer 92.70	1

=== Development Tour 14 ===
Development Tour 14 was contested on 22 June 2024. The tournament was won by Nathan Rafferty.

Quarter-finals (best of 9 legs)
Beau Greaves 89.35	0
Marvin van Velzen 95.13	5
Connor Hopkins 80.55	5
Owen Roelofs 75.03	1
Dylan Dowling 83.44	2
Wessel Nijman 90.11	5
Nathan Rafferty 82.80	5
Niko Springer 85.46	2

Semi-finals (best of 9 legs)
Marvin van Velzen 87.38	5
Connor Hopkins 71.25	0
Wessel Nijman 84.23	4
Nathan Rafferty 89.10	5

Final (best of 9 legs)
Marvin van Velzen 94.83	3
Nathan Rafferty 91.32	5

=== Development Tour 15 ===
Development Tour 15 was contested on 23 June 2024. The tournament was won by Sebastian Białecki.

Quarter-finals (best of 9 legs)
Sebastian Białecki 84.38	5
Adam Gawlas 90.55	3
Tavis Dudeney 80.67	5
Roy Rietbergen 71.07	2
Jannis Barkhausen 82.34	1
Levy Frauenfelder 84.46	5
Dominik Grüllich 78.66	5
Stefan Dees 81.81	4

Semi-finals (best of 9 legs)
Sebastian Białecki 96.75	5
Tavis Dudeney 95.71	4
Levy Frauenfelder 71.84	5
Dominik Grüllich 74.12	4

Final (best of 9 legs)
Sebastian Białecki 91.75	5
Levy Frauenfelder 84.85	4

== July ==
=== Development Tour 16 ===
Development Tour 16 was contested on 26 July 2024. The tournament was won by Wessel Nijman.

Quarter-finals (best of 9 legs)
Thomas Banks 90.33	2
Jimmy Bristow 88.58	5
Tavis Dudeney 76.97	5
Keaton Williams 74.00	1
Nathan Rafferty 94.16	2
Wessel Nijman 105.06	5
Bram van Dijk 81.77	3
Beau Greaves 83.40	5

Semi-finals (best of 9 legs)
Jimmy Bristow 81.13	2
Tavis Dudeney 80.75	5
Wessel Nijman 91.28	5
Beau Greaves 98.05	2

Final (best of 9 legs)
Tavis Dudeney 96.65	4
Wessel Nijman 97.18	5

=== Development Tour 17 ===
Development Tour 17 was contested on 26 July 2024. The tournament was won by Wessel Nijman.

Quarter-finals (best of 9 legs)
Beau Greaves 93.29	2
Wessel Nijman 95.24	5
Sascha Stuhlemmer 83.01	4
Matt Heffer 81.06	5
Niko Springer 89.86	5
Sebastian Białecki 87.69	2
Keane Barry 87.79	5
Daniel Perry 86.39	3

Semi-finals (best of 9 legs)
Wessel Nijman 79.11	5
Matt Heffer 69.57	0
Niko Springer 97.22	5
Keane Barry 85.98	2

Final (best of 9 legs)
Wessel Nijman 94.72	5
Niko Springer 94.40	3

=== Development Tour 18 ===
Development Tour 18 was contested on 27 July 2024. The tournament was won by Niko Springer.

Quarter-finals (best of 9 legs)
Wessel Nijman 96.85	5
Leighton Bennett 85.43	1
Dylan Dowling 84.35	5
Keenan Thomas 86.16	2
Dylan Slevin 95.13	5
Angelo Balsamo 64.79	0
Niko Springer 85.09	5
Craig Galliano 74.98	4

Semi-finals (best of 9 legs)
Wessel Nijman 91.65	5
Dylan Dowling 77.69	0
Dylan Slevin 83.77	0
Niko Springer 96.35	5

Final (best of 9 legs)
Wessel Nijman 94.92	4
Niko Springer 90.49	5

=== Development Tour 19 ===
Development Tour 19 was contested on 27 July 2024. The tournament was won by Wessel Nijman.

Quarter-finals (best of 9 legs)
Nathan Rafferty 83.15	2
Jack Male 82.40	5
Ryan Branley 91.27	4
Niko Springer 99.61	5
Dominik Grüllich 91.56	5
Leighton Bennett 90.58	3
Beau Greaves 85.45	4
Wessel Nijman 85.21	5

Semi-finals (best of 9 legs)
Jack Male 84.56	5
Niko Springer 83.26	4
Dominik Grüllich 85.13	4
Wessel Nijman 85.07	5

Final (best of 9 legs)
Jack Male 91.18	2
Wessel Nijman 90.69	5

=== Development Tour 20 ===
Development Tour 20 was contested on 28 July 2024. The tournament was won by Niko Springer.

Quarter-finals (best of 9 legs)
Paul Krohne 83.17	2
Leon Weber 84.37	5
Dominik Grüllich 84.45	5
Dylan Slevin 77.76	1
Wessel Nijman 98.71	5
Llew Bevan 87.11	2
Danny Jansen 92.92	3
Niko Springer 95.85	5

Semi-finals (best of 9 legs)
Leon Weber 78.66	5
Dominik Grüllich 80.52	2
Wessel Nijman 93.98	1
Niko Springer 93.92	5

Final (best of 9 legs)
Leon Weber 82.08	3
Niko Springer 87.00	5

== October ==
=== Development Tour 21 ===
Development Tour 21 was contested on 12 October 2024. The tournament was won by Wessel Nijman.

Quarter-finals (best of 9 legs)
Llew Bevan 94.22	1
Niko Springer 110.59	5
Wessel Nijman 93.09	5
Xanti Van den Bergh 89.73	4
Sebastian Białecki 88.43	4
Nathan Rafferty 88.94	5
Daan Bastiaansen 74.55	2
Jarno Bottenberg 75.09	5

Semi-finals (best of 9 legs)
Niko Springer 99.52	2
Wessel Nijman 105.03	5
Nathan Rafferty 91.65	5
Jarno Bottenberg 83.04	0

Final (best of 9 legs)
Wessel Nijman 98.88	5
Nathan Rafferty 79.96	0

=== Development Tour 22 ===
Development Tour 22 was contested on 12 October 2024. The tournament was won by Wessel Nijman, his seventh Development Tour title of the year.

Quarter-finals (best of 9 legs)
Dominik Grüllich 91.83	4
Wessel Nijman 93.13	5
Cam Crabtree 98.06	4
Jarno Bottenberg 88.34	5
Ryan Branley 81.05	2
Ieuan Halsall 79.94	5
Nathan Rafferty 90.54	5
Nathan Girvan 78.77	0

Semi-finals (best of 9 legs)
Wessel Nijman 98.30	5
Jarno Bottenberg 86.51	2
Ieuan Halsall 70.56	3
Nathan Rafferty 73.58	5

Final (best of 9 legs)
Wessel Nijman 93.10	5
Nathan Rafferty 84.40	3

=== Development Tour 23 ===
Development Tour 23 was contested on 13 October 2024. The tournament was won by Tavis Dudeney. The result meant Niko Springer qualified for the 2025 PDC World Darts Championship.

Quarter-finals (best of 9 legs)
Tavis Dudeney 89.14	5
Keane Barry 86.97	1
Levy Frauenfelder 81.54	2
Llew Bevan 90.56	5
Tyler Thorpe 92.05	5
Nathan Girvan 89.48	2
Niko Springer 93.33	3
Jurjen van der Velde 94.19	5

Semi-finals (best of 9 legs)
Tavis Dudeney 82.98	5
Llew Bevan 82.21	2
Tyler Thorpe 72.93	1
Jurjen van der Velde 87.68	5

Final (best of 9 legs)
Tavis Dudeney 84.44	5
Jurjen van der Velde 78.96	0

=== Development Tour 24 ===
Development Tour 24 was contested on 13 October 2024. The tournament was won by Henry Coates. The result qualified Keane Barry for the 2025 PDC World Darts Championship.

Quarter-finals (best of 9 legs)
Leon Weber 82.87	4
Sebastian Białecki 87.30	5
Henry Coates 88.37	5
Anton Östlund 82.76	1
Danny Jansen 78.63	4
Jon-Sebastian Wright 81.31	5
Dominik Grüllich 88.15	4
Owen Roelofs 90.69	5

Semi-finals (best of 9 legs)
Sebastian Białecki 97.90	3
Henry Coates 106.84	5
Jon-Sebastian Wright 65.88	1
Owen Roelofs 80.56	5

Final (best of 9 legs)
Henry Coates 83.39	5
Owen Roelofs 81.40	3
