= 2023 PDC Development Tour =

Darts tournament series

The 2023 PDC Development Tour (known for sponsorship reasons as the Winmau Development Tour) was a series of non-televised darts tournaments organised by the Professional Darts Corporation (PDC). A secondary tour to the PDC Pro Tour, it consisted of 24 tournaments, held over four weekends of five events and one weekend of four events.

The Development Tour is the PDC's youth system open to all players outside of the top 32 on the PDC Order of Merit that are aged 16–24.

The 2023 Development Tour rewards were as follows:

- The top two players on the 2023 Development Tour Order of Merit, who had not obtained a PDC Tour Card for the 2024 season via another method, won a two-year Tour Card for the 2024 and 2025 seasons.
- The top two players on the Development Tour Order of Merit, who had not qualified via another method, qualified for places at the 2024 PDC World Championship.
- The highest ranked player on the Development Tour Order of Merit, Gian van Veen, received a spot at the 2023 Grand Slam of Darts.
- The players in the top 16 of the Development Tour Order of Merit, who had not obtained a PDC Tour Card before 2024 Qualifying School (Q–School), were granted free entry to the final stage of Q–School.
- The eight highest ranked players from the Development Tour Order of Merit, who did not earn a Tour Card for the 2024 season, qualified for the first round of the 2024 UK Open.

2023 Development Tour ranking
Rank	Player	Earnings
1	Gian van Veen (Note: Qualified for 2024 PDC World Darts Championship via another method.) (Note: Qualified for 2024 Tour Card via another method.)	£20,950
2	Luke Littler	£20,175
3	Wessel Nijman	£14,825
4	Nathan Rafferty	£10,125
5	Sebastian Białecki	£9,025
6	Dylan Slevin	£8,725
7	Rusty-Jake Rodriguez	£8,000
8	Bradley Brooks	£7,475
9	Cam Crabtree	£7,175
10	Jurjen van der Velde	£7,125

== Prize money ==
The prize money for the Development Tour events increased by 50%. £360,000 was the total prize fund, with £15,000 being the prize fund for each of the 24 events. The winner of each event received £2,500. The prize fund breakdown was:

Stage (no. of players)		Prize money (Total: £15,000)
Winner	(1)	£2,500
Runner-up	(1)	£1,000
Semi-finalists	(2)	£750
Quarter-finalists	(4)	£500
Last 16	(8)	£300
Last 32	(16)	£200
Last 64	(32)	£75

== March ==
=== Development Tour 1 ===
Development Tour 1 was contested on Friday 31 March 2023 at the Arena MK in Milton Keynes. The tournament was won by Christopher Toonders, who defeated Marvin Kraft 5–2 in the final.

Quarter-finals (best of 9 legs)
Owen Roelofs 84.86	3
Marvin Kraft 80.84	5
Nathan Rafferty 86.45	5
Byron Garner 82.39	2
Luke Littler 93.02	3
Christopher Toonders 86.79	5
Wessel Nijman 90.63	5
Bradley Brooks 90.70	3

Semi-finals (best of 9 legs)
Marvin Kraft 92.00	5
Nathan Rafferty 84.07	1
Christopher Toonders 89.92	5
Wessel Nijman 92.11	3

Final (best of 9 legs)
Marvin Kraft 82.22	2
Christopher Toonders 90.65	5

=== Development Tour 2 ===
Development Tour 2 was contested on Friday 31 March 2023 at the Arena MK in Milton Keynes. The tournament was won by Dylan Slevin, who defeated Luke Littler 5–4 in the final.

Quarter-finals (best of 9 legs)
Luke Littler 96.86	5
Owen Roelofs 96.27	4
Tavis Dudeney 97.43	5
Cam Crabtree 87.37	1
Rusty-Jake Rodriguez 88.89	5
Reece Colley 86.61	2
Dylan Slevin 75.15	5
Harry Gregory 73.23	0

Semi-finals (best of 9 legs)
Luke Littler 94.46	5
Tavis Dudeney 90.93	3
Rusty-Jake Rodriguez 91.98	3
Dylan Slevin 95.14	5

Final (best of 9 legs)
Luke Littler 93.64	4
Dylan Slevin 97.34	5

== April ==
=== Development Tour 3 ===
Development Tour 3 was contested on Saturday 1 April 2023 at the Arena MK in Milton Keynes. The tournament was won by Luke Littler, who defeated Jurjen van der Velde 5–1 in the final.

Quarter-finals (best of 9 legs)
Stefan Dees 77.77	1
Oliver King 92.03	5
Riley Rees-Tucker 83.91	3
Luke Littler 83.89	5
Cam Crabtree 89.07	4
Nathan Rafferty 89.84	5
Jurjen van der Velde	5
Lewy Williams 86.03	4

Semi-finals (best of 9 legs)
Oliver King 83.18	2
Luke Littler 86.39	5
Nathan Rafferty 80.74	1
Jurjen van der Velde 85.77	5

Final (best of 9 legs)
Luke Littler 91.41	5
Jurjen van der Velde 72.18	1

=== Development Tour 4 ===
Development Tour 4 was contested on Saturday 1 April 2023 at the Arena MK in Milton Keynes. The tournament was won by Gian van Veen, who defeated Adam Paxton 5–2 in the final.

Quarter-finals (best of 9 legs)
Wessel Nijman 99.97	5
Luke Littler 92.78	4
Jordan Boyce 63.47	1
Adam Paxton 79.27	5
Bradley Brooks 89.72	4
Sebastian Białecki 97.75	5
Owen Bates 80.40	3
Gian van Veen 80.51	5

Semi-finals (best of 9 legs)
Wessel Nijman 88.88	4
Adam Paxton 89.54	5
Sebastian Białecki 80.94	2
Gian van Veen 91.14	5

Final (best of 9 legs)
Adam Paxton 74.85	2
Gian van Veen 80.50	5

=== Development Tour 5 ===
Development Tour 5 was contested on Sunday 2 April 2023 at the Arena MK in Milton Keynes. The tournament was won by Luke Littler, who defeated Kevin Troppmann 5–3 in the final.

Quarter-finals (best of 9 legs)
Gian van Veen 93.66	3
Kevin Troppmann 95.95	5
Charlie Manby 80.81	1
Lewis Gurney 93.69	5
Luke Littler 85.62	5
Sam Cromwell 86.82	4
Owen Bates 91.58	5
Connor Hopkins 89.92	3

Semi-finals (best of 9 legs)
Kevin Troppmann 87.19	5
Lewis Gurney 89.31	2
Luke Littler 99.89	5
Owen Bates 91.26	2

Final (best of 9 legs)
Kevin Troppmann 80.93	3
Luke Littler 92.55	5

=== Development Tour 6 ===
Development Tour 6 was contested on Friday 28 April 2023 at the Robin Park Tennis Centre in Wigan. The tournament was won by Wessel Nijman, who defeated Nathan Girvan 5–3 in the final.

Quarter-finals (best of 9 legs)
Jack Male 74.11	2
Nathan Girvan 81.39	5
Justin Hewitt 87.38	5
Christopher Toonders 74.18	0
Wessel Nijman 99.96	5
Luke Littler 100.12	3
Lewis Gurney 89.88	1
Owen Roelofs 82.00	5

Semi-finals (best of 9 legs)
Nathan Girvan 94.09	5
Justin Hewitt 79.01	2
Wessel Nijman 92.91	5
Owen Roelofs 90.04	4

Final (best of 9 legs)
Nathan Girvan 90.43	3
Wessel Nijman 96.87	5

=== Development Tour 7 ===
Development Tour 7 was contested on Friday 28 April 2023 at the Robin Park Tennis Centre in Wigan. The tournament was won by Sebastian Białecki, who defeated Leighton Bennett 5–4 in the final.

Quarter-finals (best of 9 legs)
Sebastian Białecki 86.26	5
Ciarán Teehan 80.86	3
Nathan Girvan 91.07	5
Viani Van den Bergh 78.17	2
Nathan Rafferty 82.83	5
Justin Hewitt 79.31	3
Leighton Bennett 86.45	5
James Beeton 85.17	2

Semi-finals (best of 9 legs)
Sebastian Białecki 90.33	5
Nathan Girvan 89.32	3
Nathan Rafferty 82.66	3
Leighton Bennett 86.95	5

Final (best of 9 legs)
Sebastian Białecki 85.32	5
Leighton Bennett 82.78	4

=== Development Tour 8 ===
Development Tour 8 was contested on Saturday 29 April 2023 at the Robin Park Tennis Centre in Wigan. The tournament was won by Gian van Veen, who defeated Thomas Banks 5–2 in the final.

Quarter-finals (best of 9 legs)
Luke Littler 88.07	3
Nathan Rafferty 95.57	5
Damian Vetjens 84.17	2
Thomas Banks 93.94	5
Gian van Veen 96.84	5
Jim Moston 85.04	1
Jurjen van der Velde 85.22	2
Dominik Grüllich 92.23	5

Semi-finals (best of 9 legs)
Nathan Rafferty 86.48	2
Thomas Banks 95.70	5
Gian van Veen 105.85	5
Dominik Grüllich 83.96	0

Final (best of 9 legs)
Thomas Banks 95.37	2
Gian van Veen 97.17	5

=== Development Tour 9 ===
Development Tour 9 was contested on Saturday 29 April 2023 at the Robin Park Tennis Centre in Wigan. The tournament was won by Ciarán Teehan, who defeated Jurjen van der Velde 5–4 in the final.

Quarter-finals (best of 9 legs)
Jacob Gwynne 88.46	2
Jarred Cole 89.59	5
Bradly Roes 82.91	3
Ciarán Teehan 88.86	5
Jurjen van der Velde 95.15	5
Christopher Toonders 77.03	2
Bradley Brooks 93.74	5
Nathan Girvan 81.40	1

Semi-finals (best of 9 legs)
Jarred Cole 74.23	1
Ciarán Teehan 81.14	5
Jurjen van der Velde 81.68	5
Bradley Brooks 65.52	0

Final (best of 9 legs)
Ciarán Teehan 89.44	5
Jurjen van der Velde 90.50	4

=== Development Tour 10 ===
Development Tour 10 was contested on Sunday 30 April 2023 at the Robin Park Tennis Centre in Wigan. The tournament was won by Gian van Veen, who defeated Bradly Roes 5–1 in the final.

Quarter-finals (best of 9 legs)
Jarred Cole 87.42	5
Luke Littler 93.83	4
Gian van Veen 94.52	5
Jurjen van der Velde 87.23	1
Bradly Roes 93.96	5
Jim Moston 91.27	4
David Schlichting 77.74	2
Dominik Grüllich 82.18	5

Semi-finals (best of 9 legs)
Jarred Cole 102.38	0
Gian van Veen 113.86	5
Bradly Roes 85.40	5
Dominik Grüllich 73.96	0

Final (best of 9 legs)
Gian van Veen 87.27	5
Bradly Roes 81.91	1

== June ==
=== Development Tour 11 ===
Development Tour 11 was contested on Friday 9 June 2023 at Halle 39 in Hildesheim. The tournament was won by Bradley Brooks, who defeated Owen Roelofs 5–3 in the final.

Quarter-finals (best of 9 legs)
Harry Gregory 81.33	5
Lewis Gurney 78.92	1
Fred Box 82.22	2
Bradley Brooks 98.03	5
Luke Littler 93.86	3
Owen Roelofs 93.40	5
Bradly Roes 86.01	5
Jarred Cole 86.62	4

Semi-finals (best of 9 legs)
Harry Gregory 89.59	2
Bradley Brooks 97.23	5
Owen Roelofs 88.88	5
Bradly Roes 90.36	3

Final (best of 9 legs)
Bradley Brooks 101.38	5
Owen Roelofs 98.24	3

=== Development Tour 12 ===
Development Tour 12 was contested on Friday 9 June 2023 at Halle 39 in Hildesheim. The tournament was won by Wessel Nijman, who defeated Dylan Slevin 5–1 in the final.

Quarter-finals (best of 9 legs)
Sebastian Białecki 86.31	2
Rusty-Jake Rodriguez 96.91	5
Filip Ljubenko 86.10	1
Wessel Nijman 98.97	5
Owen Roelofs 85.37	3
Gian van Veen 99.87	5
Jack Male 81.15	2
Dylan Slevin 82.49	5

Semi-finals (best of 9 legs)
Rusty-Jake Rodriguez 84.60	2
Wessel Nijman 91.47	5
Gian van Veen 95.60	4
Dylan Slevin 90.33	5

Final (best of 9 legs)
Wessel Nijman 100.34	5
Dylan Slevin 95.38	1

=== Development Tour 13 ===
Development Tour 13 was contested on Saturday 10 June 2023 at Halle 39 in Hildesheim. The tournament was won by Gian van Veen, who defeated Wessel Nijman 5–4 in the final.

Quarter-finals (best of 9 legs)
Connor Arberry 77.81	1
Jarred Cole 81.85	5
Bradley Brooks 97.10	4
Wessel Nijman 99.40	5
Lewis Gurney 90.86	5
Bradly Roes 74.48	1
Gian van Veen 94.28	5
Cam Crabtree 90.35	4

Semi-finals (best of 9 legs)
Jarred Cole 104.14	3
Wessel Nijman 101.95	5
Lewis Gurney 90.04	4
Gian van Veen 91.28	5

Final (best of 9 legs)
Wessel Nijman 98.48	4
Gian van Veen 96.05	5

=== Development Tour 14 ===
Development Tour 14 was contested on Saturday 10 June 2023 at Halle 39 in Hildesheim. The tournament was won by Jarred Cole, who defeated Rusty-Jake Rodriguez 5–1 in the final.

Quarter-finals (best of 9 legs)
Jurjen van der Velde 87.13	1
Levy Frauenfelder 88.67	5
Rusty-Jake Rodriguez 86.18	5
Robert Kef 80.10	2
Jordan Sharpe 75.50	2
Cam Crabtree 81.60	5
Jarred Cole 84.87	5
Dominik Grüllich 76.66	2

Semi-finals (best of 9 legs)
Levy Frauenfelder 89.23	1
Rusty-Jake Rodriguez 98.26	5
Cam Crabtree 80.49	1
Jarred Cole 93.81	5

Final (best of 9 legs)
Rusty-Jake Rodriguez 80.94	1
Jarred Cole 90.09	5

=== Development Tour 15 ===
Development Tour 15 was contested on Sunday 11 June 2023 at Halle 39 in Hildesheim. The tournament was won by Adam Gawlas, who defeated Dylan Slevin 5–4 in the final.

Quarter-finals (best of 9 legs)
Adam Gawlas 81.86	5
David Schlichting 79.18	2
Nathan Rafferty 85.74	2
Jurjen van der Velde 88.79	5
Bradley Brooks 91.58	4
Levy Frauenfelder 85.59	5
Dylan Slevin 84.82	5
Rusty-Jake Rodriguez 85.59	3

Semi-finals (best of 9 legs)
Adam Gawlas 91.14	5
Jurjen van der Velde 84.77	4
Levy Frauenfelder 88.97	2
Dylan Slevin 96.83	5

Final (best of 9 legs)
Adam Gawlas 87.84	5
Dylan Slevin 91.49	4

== July ==
=== Development Tour 16 ===
Development Tour 16 was contested on Friday 14 July 2023 at the Leicester Arena. The tournament was won by Luke Littler, who defeated Bradly Roes 5–2 in the final.

Quarter-finals (best of 9 legs)
Luke Littler 95.61	5
Keane Barry 91.41	4
Keelan Kay 91.17	1
Cam Crabtree 97.96	5
Owen Bates 89.02	5
Rusty-Jake Rodriguez 87.23	3
Bradly Roes 79.45	5
Byron Garner 72.38	1

Semi-finals (best of 9 legs)
Luke Littler 103.89	5
Cam Crabtree 90.80	2
Owen Bates 93.71	2
Bradly Roes 92.25	5

Final (best of 9 legs)
Luke Littler 90.03	5
Bradly Roes 88.25	2

=== Development Tour 17 ===
Development Tour 17 was contested on Friday 14 July 2023 at the Leicester Arena. James Beeton hit a nine-dart finish in his match against Luke Rutter. The tournament was won by Gian van Veen, who whitewashed Reece Colley 5–0 in the final.

Quarter-finals (best of 9 legs)
Keelan Kay 85.82	3
Reece Colley 85.85	5
Rune Van Damme 77.14	3
Bradly Roes 82.89	5
Nathan Rafferty 93.82	3
Adam Gawlas 96.46	5
Tavis Dudeney 78.03	1
Gian van Veen 93.31	5

Semi-finals (best of 9 legs)
Reece Colley 85.93	5
Bradly Roes 84.84	4
Adam Gawlas 90.88	2
Gian van Veen 93.11	5

Final (best of 9 legs)
Reece Colley 74.58	0
Gian van Veen 93.94	5

=== Development Tour 18 ===
Development Tour 18 was contested on Saturday 15 July 2023 at the Leicester Arena. The tournament was won by Nathan Rafferty, who defeated Cam Crabtree 5–3 in the final.

Quarter-finals (best of 9 legs)
Dylan Slevin 100.51	5
Gian van Veen 93.18	2
Christopher Toonders 84.69	3
Cam Crabtree 87.92	5
Luke Littler 90.32	2
Nathan Rafferty 91.11	5
Sebastian Białecki 82.99	4
Roman Benecký 86.65	5

Semi-finals (best of 9 legs)
Dylan Slevin 89.84	0
Cam Crabtree 92.78	5
Nathan Rafferty 90.54	5
Roman Benecký 73.54	0

Final (best of 9 legs)
Cam Crabtree 93.13	3
Nathan Rafferty 92.44	5

=== Development Tour 19 ===
Development Tour 19 was contested on Saturday 15 July 2023 at the Leicester Arena. The tournament was won by Wessel Nijman, who defeated Gian van Veen 5–3 in the final.

Quarter-finals (best of 9 legs)
Nathan Rafferty 75.63	3
James Beeton 83.89	5
Wessel Nijman 95.98	5
Jurjen van der Velde 88.43	3
Sebastian Białecki 96.00	3
Gian van Veen 88.13	5
Dylan Slevin 83.57	5
Adam Gawlas 75.13	2

Semi-finals (best of 9 legs)
James Beeton 90.69	3
Wessel Nijman 94.80	5
Gian van Veen 98.24	5
Dylan Slevin 88.31	4

Final (best of 9 legs)
Wessel Nijman 96.23	5
Gian van Veen 93.28	3

=== Development Tour 20 ===
Development Tour 20 was contested on Sunday 16 July 2023 at the Leicester Arena. The tournament was won by Luke Littler, who averaged 115.22 in his last 32 win against Lewy Williams, hit a nine-dart finish in his last 16 win against Rune Van Damme, and defeated Gian van Veen 5–4 in the final.

Quarter-finals (best of 9 legs)
Nathan Rafferty 87.05	3
Jamai van den Herik 81.69	5
Owen Bates 93.96	2
Luke Littler 102.00	5
Gian van Veen 99.42	5
Cam Crabtree 97.85	2
Christopher Toonders 94.72	4
Wessel Nijman 97.18	5

Semi-finals (best of 9 legs)
Jamai van den Herik 93.41	2
Luke Littler 94.08	5
Gian van Veen 90.63	5
Wessel Nijman 99.79	2

Final (best of 9 legs)
Luke Littler 89.87	5
Gian van Veen 89.36	4

== August ==
=== Development Tour 21 ===
Development Tour 21 was contested on Friday 18 August 2023 at the Arena MK in Milton Keynes. The tournament was won by Rusty-Jake Rodriguez, who defeated Dominik Grüllich 5–3 in the final.

Quarter-finals (best of 9 legs)
Nathan Girvan 85.78	4
Rusty-Jake Rodriguez 85.59	5
Dylan Slevin 96.35	5
Shusaku Nakamura 67.04	0
Wessel Nijman 97.60	5
Sebastian Białecki 85.00	0
Dominik Grüllich 95.68	5
Llew Bevan 90.88	2

Semi-finals (best of 9 legs)
Rusty-Jake Rodriguez 94.99	5
Dylan Slevin 89.65	3
Wessel Nijman 103.79	4
Dominik Grüllich 99.62	5

Final (best of 9 legs)
Rusty-Jake Rodriguez 84.35	5
Dominik Grüllich 81.20	3

=== Development Tour 22 ===
Development Tour 22 was contested on Friday 18 August 2023 at the Arena MK in Milton Keynes. The tournament was won by Sebastian Białecki, who defeated Keane Barry 5–3 in the final. The result qualified Luke Littler for the 2024 PDC World Darts Championship, where he would reach the final, and secured Littler a PDC Tour Card for the 2024 and 2025 seasons.

Quarter-finals (best of 9 legs)
Adam Paxton 81.10	3
Sebastian Białecki 86.45	5
Nathan Girvan 82.38	1
Gian van Veen 90.61	5
Luke Littler 98.83	4
Wessel Nijman 96.99	5
Jacob Gwynne 89.74	0
Keane Barry 105.85	5

Semi-finals (best of 9 legs)
Sebastian Białecki 103.38	5
Gian van Veen 91.20	4
Wessel Nijman 89.44	3
Keane Barry 95.90	5

Final (best of 9 legs)
Sebastian Białecki 96.62	5
Keane Barry 96.08	3

=== Development Tour 23 ===
Development Tour 23 was contested on Saturday 19 August 2023 at the Arena MK in Milton Keynes. The tournament was won by Gian van Veen, who defeated Luke Littler 5–4 in the final. This was van Veen's sixth Development Tour title of the year.

Quarter-finals (best of 9 legs)
Dylan Slevin 89.46	5
Jenson Walker 78.30	0
Gian van Veen 101.58	5
Wessel Nijman 97.30	3
Rune Van Damme 80.54	5
Llew Bevan 83.32	2
Owen Bates 91.18	3
Luke Littler 96.10	5

Semi-finals (best of 9 legs)
Dylan Slevin 94.09	4
Gian van Veen 94.38	5
Rune Van Damme 76.72	1
Luke Littler 98.56	5

Final (best of 9 legs)
Gian van Veen 94.61	5
Luke Littler 95.68	4

=== Development Tour 24 ===
Development Tour 24 was contested on Saturday 19 August 2023 at the Arena MK in Milton Keynes. The tournament was won by Luke Littler, who defeated Cam Crabtree 5–1 in the final. This was Littler's fifth Development Tour title of the year.

Quarter-finals (best of 9 legs)
Kayden Milne 80.36	3
Luke Littler 87.96	5
Jarno Bottenberg 96.62	5
Viktor Tingström 87.75	1
Marvin Kraft 79.98	4
Dominik Grüllich 91.29	5
Shusaku Nakamura 80.94	1
Cam Crabtree 90.03	5

Semi-finals (best of 9 legs)
Luke Littler 97.34	5
Jarno Bottenberg 91.71	2
Dominik Grüllich 85.71	3
Cam Crabtree 87.50	5

Final (best of 9 legs)
Luke Littler 91.97	5
Cam Crabtree 83.31	1
