= 2018 PDC World Youth Championship =

2018 PDC Unicorn World Youth Championship

Tournament information
- Dates: 5 November 2018; 25 November 2018 (final)
- Venue: Butlin's Minehead
- Location: Minehead
- Country: England
- Organisation(s): PDC
- Format: Legs; First to 5 (group stage); First to 6 (knockout phase)
- Prize fund: £60,000
- Winner's share: £10,000

Champion(s)
- (Belgium) Dimitri Van den Bergh

The 2018 PDC Unicorn World Youth Championship was the eighth edition of the PDC World Youth Championship, a tournament organised by the Professional Darts Corporation for darts players aged between 16 and 23.

In a change mirroring that of the 2019 PDC World Darts Championship, the field of this competition increased from 64 to 96 players, who competed in 32 groups of three, with the winner of each progressing to the knockout stages.

The group stage and knock-out phase from the last 32 to the semi-finals was played at Robin Park Centre, Wigan, on 5 November 2018. The final took place on 25 November 2018, before the final of the 2018 Players Championship Finals.

Belgium's Dimitri Van den Bergh was the defending champion after defeating English player Josh Payne 6–3 in the 2017 final.

Van den Bergh successfully defended his youth title, by beating Germany's Martin Schindler 6–3 in the final.

Van den Bergh became the first player to defend the title and overall to win two times the PDC World Youth Title.

== Prize money ==
Position (no. of players)		Prize money (Total: £60,000)
Winner	(1)	£10,000
Runner-up	(1)	£5,000
Semi-finalists	(2)	£2,500
Quarter-finalists	(4)	£1,600
Last 16	(8)	£1,000
Last 32	(16)	£500
Second in group	(32)	£300
Third in group	(32)	£250

== Qualifiers ==
74 players from the final 2018 PDC Development Tour Order of Merit qualified, as did 22 international qualifiers. Tahuna Irwin, who would have been the 23rd international qualifier, withdrew due to an issue with immigration. Bradley Brooks, Dawson Murschell and Rusty-Jake Rodriguez qualified through the Development Tour Order of Merit as well as through an International Qualifier, which means the players ranked 75, 76 and 77 all qualified. Levy Frauenfelder replaced Jakob Kelly.

Development Tour qualifiers:

1. (England) Luke Humphries
2. (Belgium) Dimitri Van den Bergh
3. (England) Ted Evetts
4. (Netherlands) Geert Nentjes
5. (Germany) Martin Schindler
6. (England) George Killington
7. (Austria) Rowby-John Rodriguez
8. (England) Ryan Meikle
9. (Netherlands) Niels Zonneveld
10. (Germany) Christian Bunse
11. (England) Jarred Cole
12. (Northern Ireland) Nathan Rafferty
13. (Netherlands) Berry van Peer
14. (Belgium) Kenny Neyens
15. (Netherlands) Wessel Nijman
16. (England) Rob Hewson
17. (England) Bradley Brooks
18. (Netherlands) Jimmy Hendriks
19. (Canada) Dawson Murschell
20. (England) George Gardner
21. (England) Bradley Kirk
22. (Netherlands) Justin van Tergouw
23. (Belgium) Mike De Decker
24. (Wales) Rhys Griffin
25. (England) Tommy Wilson
26. (Austria) Rusty-Jake Rodriguez
27. (England) Lee Budgen
28. (England) Rhys Hayden
29. (Belgium) Brian Raman
30. (England) Scott Dale
31. (Netherlands) Melvin de Fijter
32. (England) Joe Davis
33. (Scotland) William Borland
34. (England) Josh McCarthy
35. (England) Callan Rydz
36. (England) Harry Ward
37. (Netherlands) Danny van Trijp
38. (Republic of Ireland) Jordan Boyce
39. (Netherlands) Jeffrey de Zwaan
40. (England) Tom Lonsdale
41. (Republic of Ireland) Shane McGuirk
42. (England) Lewis Pride
43. (Scotland) Greg Ritchie
44. (Netherlands) Mike van Duivenbode
45. (Netherlands) Kevin Doets
46. (Germany) Nico Blum
47. (Netherlands) Patrick van den Boogaard
48. (Republic of Ireland) Dean Finn
49. (England) Callum Loose
50. (England) John Brown
51. (Netherlands) Sven Groen
52. (England) Mark Baxter
53. (Netherlands) Maikel Verberk
54. (England) Thomas Lovely
55. (England) Carl Batchelor
56. (Wales) Justin Smith
57. (Germany) Hendrik Eggermann
58. (England) Jaikob Selby
59. (Republic of Ireland) Dylan Powell
60. (England) Scott Jackson
61. (Germany) Christopher Hansch
62. (England) ~~Jakob Kelly~~
63. (England) Fred Box
64. (England) Jack Male
65. (Germany) Nico Schlund
66. (England) Adam Paxton
67. (England) Danny Key
68. (England) Conor Mayes
69. (England) Keelan Kay
70. (Germany) Sebastian Pohl
71. (England) Adam Watson
72. (England) Jack Vincent
73. (Scotland) Andrew Davidson
74. (England) Declan Cox
75. (England) Jack Main
76. (England) Aaron Holdstock
77. (England) Callum Matthews
78. (Netherlands) Levy Frauenfelder

International qualifiers:

- (Russia) Maxim Aldoshin
- (Republic of Ireland) Keane Barry
- (Gibraltar) Jarvis Bautista
- (United States) Sean Coohill
- (Canada) Logan Crooks
- (South Africa) Alexander Faddel
- (Republic of Ireland) Jack Faragher
- (Australia) Steve Fitzpatrick
- (Netherlands) Mats Gies
- (Japan) Tomoya Goto
- (Germany) Sven Hesse
- (New Zealand) ~~Tahuna Irwin~~
- (Hungary) Patrik Kovács
- (Australia) Ryan Lynch
- (Spain) Jesus Vicente Macias
- (Philippines) Paolo Nebrida
- (Sweden) Hampus Norrstrom
- (Denmark) Nicolai Rasmussen
- (Germany) Lukas Wenig
- (China) Xiaochen Zong

== Draw ==
=== Group stage ===
==== Group 1 ====
Pos.	Player	P	W	L	LF	LA	+/−	Pts	Status
1	(England) Luke Humphries (1)	2	2	0	10	4	+6	4	Q
2	(England) Carl Batchelor	2	1	1	8	5	+3	2	Eliminated
3	(Australia) Ryan Lynch	2	0	2	1	10	-9	0	Eliminated

Carl Batchelor (England)	5 - 0	(Australia) Ryan Lynch
Luke Humphries (England)	5 - 1	(Australia) Ryan Lynch
Luke Humphries (England)	5 - 3	(England) Carl Batchelor

==== Group 2 ====
Pos.	Player	P	W	L	LF	LA	+/−	Pts	Status
1	(England) Callan Rydz	2	2	0	10	7	+3	4	Q
2	(Canada) Logan Crooks	2	1	1	8	8	0	2	Eliminated
3	(England) Joe Davis (32)	2	0	2	7	10	-3	0	Eliminated

Callan Rydz (England)	5 - 3	(Canada) Logan Crooks
Joe Davis (England)	3 - 5	(Canada) Logan Crooks
Joe Davis (England)	4 - 5	(England) Callan Rydz

==== Group 3 ====
Pos.	Player	P	W	L	LF	LA	+/−	Pts	Status
1	(Philippines) Paolo Nebrida	2	2	0	10	6	+4	4	Q
2	(England) Rob Hewson (16)	2	1	1	9	5	+4	2	Eliminated
3	(Gibraltar) Jarvis Bautista	2	0	2	2	10	-8	0	Eliminated

Jarvis Bautista (Gibraltar)	2 - 5	(Philippines) Paolo Nebrida
Rob Hewson (England)	5 - 0	(Gibraltar) Jarvis Bautista
Rob Hewson (England)	4 - 5	(Philippines) Paolo Nebrida

==== Group 4 ====
Pos.	Player	P	W	L	LF	LA	+/−	Pts	Status
1	(England) Tom Lonsdale	2	2	0	10	7	+3	4	Q
2	(England) Bradley Brooks (17)	2	1	1	8	8	+0	2	Eliminated
3	(Sweden) Hampus Norrström	2	0	2	6	10	-3	0	Eliminated

Tom Lonsdale (England)	5 - 4	(Sweden) Hampus Norrström
Bradley Brooks (England)	5 - 3	(Sweden) Hampus Norrström
Bradley Brooks (England)	3 - 5	(England) Tom Lonsdale

==== Group 5 ====
Pos.	Player	P	W	L	LF	LA	+/−	Pts	Status
1	(England) Ryan Meikle (8)	2	2	0	10	3	+7	4	Q
2	(Scotland) Greg Ritchie	2	1	1	7	5	+2	2	Eliminated
3	(South Africa) Alexander Faddel	2	0	2	1	10	-9	0	Eliminated

Alexander Faddel (South Africa)	0 - 5	(Scotland) Greg Ritchie
Ryan Meikle (England)	5 - 1	(South Africa) Alexander Faddel
Ryan Meikle (England)	5 - 2	(Scotland) Greg Ritchie

==== Group 6 ====
Pos.	Player	P	W	L	LF	LA	+/−	Pts	Status
1	(England) Adam Paxton	2	2	0	10	7	+3	4	Q
2	(England) Tommy Wilson (25)	2	1	1	9	5	+4	2	Eliminated
3	(Germany) Sebastian Pohl	2	0	2	3	10	-7	0	Eliminated

Adam Paxton (England)	5 - 3	(Germany) Sebastian Pohl
Tommy Wilson (England)	5 - 0	(Germany) Sebastian Pohl
Tommy Wilson (England)	4 - 5	(England) Adam Paxton

==== Group 7 ====
Pos.	Player	P	W	L	LF	LA	+/−	Pts	Status
1	(England) Harry Ward	2	2	0	10	3	+7	4	Q
2	(Netherlands) Niels Zonneveld (9)	2	1	1	6	7	-1	2	Eliminated
3	(England) Fred Box	2	0	2	4	10	-6	0	Eliminated

Harry Ward (England)	5 - 2	(England) Fred Box
Niels Zonneveld (Netherlands)	5 - 2	(England) Fred Box
Niels Zonneveld (Netherlands)	1 - 5	(England) Harry Ward

==== Group 8 ====
Pos.	Player	P	W	L	LF	LA	+/−	Pts	Status
1	(Wales) Rhys Griffin (24)	2	2	0	10	5	+5	4	Q
2	(China) Xiaochen Zong	2	1	1	9	6	+3	2	Eliminated
3	(Germany) Sven Hesse	2	0	2	2	10	-8	0	Eliminated

Xiaochen Zong (China)	5 - 1	(Germany) Sven Hesse
Rhys Griffin (Wales)	5 - 1	(Germany) Sven Hesse
Rhys Griffin (Wales)	5 - 4	(China) Xiaochen Zong

==== Group 9 ====
Pos.	Player	P	W	L	LF	LA	+/−	Pts	Status
1	(Germany) Martin Schindler (5)	2	2	0	10	4	+6	4	Q
2	(Germany) Lukas Wenig	2	1	1	8	7	+1	2	Eliminated
3	(England) Declan Cox	2	0	2	3	10	-7	0	Eliminated

Lukas Wenig (Germany)	5 - 2	(England) Declan Cox
Martin Schindler (Germany)	5 - 1	(England) Declan Cox
Martin Schindler (Germany)	5 - 3	(Germany) Lukas Wenig

==== Group 10 ====
Pos.	Player	P	W	L	LF	LA	+/−	Pts	Status
1	(England) Rhys Hayden (28)	2	2	0	10	2	+8	4	Q
2	(England) Aaron Holdstock	2	1	1	6	7	-1	2	Eliminated
3	(Republic of Ireland) Jack Faragher	2	0	2	3	10	-7	0	Eliminated

Jack Faragher (Republic of Ireland)	2 - 5	(England) Aaron Holdstock
Rhys Hayden (England)	5 - 1	(Republic of Ireland) Jack Faragher
Rhys Hayden (England)	5 - 1	(England) Aaron Holdstock

==== Group 11 ====
Pos.	Player	P	W	L	LF	LA	+/−	Pts	Status
1	(Germany) Nico Schlund	2	2	0	10	2	+8	4	Q
2	(England) Conor Mayes	2	1	1	7	8	-1	2	Eliminated
3	(Northern Ireland) Nathan Rafferty (12)	2	0	2	3	10	-7	0	Eliminated

Nico Schlund (Germany)	5 - 2	(England) Conor Mayes
Nathan Rafferty (Northern Ireland)	3 - 5	(England) Conor Mayes
Nathan Rafferty (Northern Ireland)	0 - 5	(Germany) Nico Schlund

==== Group 12 ====
Pos.	Player	P	W	L	LF	LA	+/−	Pts	Status
1	(England) Bradley Kirk (21)	2	2	0	10	6	+4	4	Q
2	(Netherlands) Sven Groen	2	1	1	8	6	+2	2	Eliminated
3	(Republic of Ireland) Keane Barry	2	0	2	4	10	-6	0	Eliminated

Keane Barry (Republic of Ireland)	1 - 5	(Netherlands) Sven Groen
Bradley Kirk (England)	5 - 3	(Republic of Ireland) Keane Barry
Bradley Kirk (England)	5 - 3	(Netherlands) Sven Groen

==== Group 13 ====
Pos.	Player	P	W	L	LF	LA	+/−	Pts	Status
1	(Netherlands) Geert Nentjes (4)	2	2	0	10	1	+9	4	Q
2	(Australia) Steve Fitzpatrick	2	1	1	6	8	-2	2	Eliminated
3	(England) Callum Matthews	2	0	2	3	10	-7	0	Eliminated

Callum Matthews (England)	3 - 5	(Australia) Steve Fitzpatrick
Geert Nentjes (Netherlands)	5 - 0	(England) Callum Matthews
Geert Nentjes (Netherlands)	5 - 1	(Australia) Steve Fitzpatrick

==== Group 14 ====
Pos.	Player	P	W	L	LF	LA	+/−	Pts	Status
1	(Belgium) Brian Raman (29)	2	2	0	10	5	+5	4	Q
2	(Netherlands) Mats Gies	2	1	1	8	7	+1	2	Eliminated
3	(England) John Brown	2	0	2	4	10	-6	0	Eliminated

John Brown (England)	2 - 5	(Netherlands) Mats Gies
Brian Raman (Belgium)	5 - 2	(England) John Brown
Brian Raman (Belgium)	5 - 3	(Netherlands) Mats Gies

==== Group 15 ====
Pos.	Player	P	W	L	LF	LA	+/−	Pts	Status
1	(Netherlands) Berry van Peer (13)	2	2	0	10	2	+8	4	Q
2	(England) Danny Key	2	1	1	7	5	+2	2	Eliminated
3	(Spain) Jesús Vicente Macías	2	0	2	0	10	-10	0	Eliminated

Jesús Vicente Macías (Spain)	0 - 5	(England) Danny Key
Berry van Peer (Netherlands)	5 - 0	(Spain) Jesús Vicente Macías
Berry van Peer (Netherlands)	5 - 2	(England) Danny Key

==== Group 16 ====
Pos.	Player	P	W	L	LF	LA	+/−	Pts	Status
1	(Wales) Justin Smith	2	1	1	9	6	+3	2	Q
2	(England) George Gardner (20)	2	1	1	6	6	0	2	Eliminated
3	(Scotland) William Borland	2	1	1	6	9	-3	2	Eliminated

William Borland (Scotland)	5 - 4	(Wales) Justin Smith
George Gardner (England)	1 - 5	(Wales) Justin Smith
George Gardner (England)	5 - 1	(Scotland) William Borland

==== Group 17 ====
Pos.	Player	P	W	L	LF	LA	+/−	Pts	Status
1	(Belgium) Dimitri Van den Bergh (2)	2	2	0	10	5	+5	4	Q
2	(England) Keelan Kay	2	1	1	6	9	-3	2	Eliminated
3	(Hungary) Patrik Kovács	2	0	2	8	10	-2	0	Eliminated

Patrik Kovács (Hungary)	4 - 5	(England) Keelan Kay
Dimitri Van den Bergh (Belgium)	5 - 4	(Hungary) Patrik Kovács
Dimitri Van den Bergh (Belgium)	5 - 1	(England) Keelan Kay

==== Group 18 ====
Pos.	Player	P	W	L	LF	LA	+/−	Pts	Status
1	(Netherlands) Melvin de Fijter (31)	2	2	0	10	4	+6	4	Q
2	(England) Jack Vincent	2	1	1	7	8	-1	2	Eliminated
3	(England) Jaikob Selby	2	0	2	5	10	-5	0	Eliminated

Jaikob Selby (England)	3 - 5	(England) Jack Vincent
Melvin de Fijter (Netherlands)	5 - 2	(England) Jaikob Selby
Melvin de Fijter (Netherlands)	5 - 2	(England) Jack Vincent

==== Group 19 ====
Pos.	Player	P	W	L	LF	LA	+/−	Pts	Status
1	(England) Thomas Lovely	2	2	0	10	6	+4	4	Q
2	(United States) Sean Coohill	2	1	1	8	9	-1	2	Eliminated
3	(Netherlands) Wessel Nijman (25)	2	0	2	7	10	-3	0	Eliminated

Sean Coohill (United States)	3 - 5	(England) Thomas Lovely
Wessel Nijman (Netherlands)	4 - 5	(United States) Sean Coohill
Wessel Nijman (Netherlands)	3 - 5	(England) Thomas Lovely

==== Group 20 ====
Pos.	Player	P	W	L	LF	LA	+/−	Pts	Status
1	(England) Jack Main	2	2	0	10	4	+6	4	Q
2	(Netherlands) Jimmy Hendriks (18)	2	1	1	8	8	0	2	Eliminated
3	(Republic of Ireland) Shane McGuirk	2	0	2	4	10	-6	0	Eliminated

Jack Main (England)	5 - 1	(Republic of Ireland) Shane McGuirk
Jimmy Hendriks (Netherlands)	5 - 3	(Republic of Ireland) Shane McGuirk
Jimmy Hendriks (Netherlands)	3 - 5	(England) Jack Main

==== Group 21 ====
Pos.	Player	P	W	L	LF	LA	+/−	Pts	Status
1	(Netherlands) Mike van Duivenbode	2	2	0	10	3	+7	4	Q
2	(Austria) Rowby-John Rodriguez (7)	2	1	1	8	6	+2	2	Eliminated
3	(Germany) Hendrik Eggermann	2	0	2	1	10	-9	0	Eliminated

Hendrik Eggermann (Germany)	0 - 5	(Netherlands) Mike van Duivenbode
Rowby-John Rodriguez (Austria)	5 - 1	(Germany) Hendrik Eggermann
Rowby-John Rodriguez (Austria)	3 - 5	(Netherlands) Mike van Duivenbode

==== Group 22 ====
Pos.	Player	P	W	L	LF	LA	+/−	Pts	Status
1	(Austria) Rusty-Jake Rodriguez (26)	2	2	0	10	2	+8	4	Q
2	(Russia) Maxim Aldoshin	2	1	1	6	8	-2	2	Eliminated
3	(England) Josh McCarthy	2	0	2	4	10	-6	0	Eliminated

Maxim Aldoshin (Russia)	5 - 3	(England) Josh McCarthy
Rusty-Jake Rodriguez (Austria)	5 - 1	(England) Josh McCarthy
Rusty-Jake Rodriguez (Austria)	5 - 1	(Russia) Maxim Aldoshin

==== Group 23 ====
Pos.	Player	P	W	L	LF	LA	+/−	Pts	Status
1	(Germany) Christian Bunse (10)	2	2	0	10	6	+4	4	Q
2	(Netherlands) Levy Frauenfelder	2	1	1	8	8	0	2	Eliminated
3	(Scotland) Andrew Davidson	2	0	2	6	10	-4	0	Eliminated

Andrew Davidson (Scotland)	3 - 5	(Netherlands) Levy Frauenfelder
Christian Bunse (Germany)	5 - 3	(Scotland) Andrew Davidson
Christian Bunse (Germany)	5 - 3	(Netherlands) Levy Frauenfelder

==== Group 24 ====
Pos.	Player	P	W	L	LF	LA	+/−	Pts	Status
1	(Belgium) Mike De Decker (23)	2	2	0	10	2	+8	4	Q
2	(Germany) Nico Blum	2	1	1	6	9	-3	2	Eliminated
3	(England) Adam Watson	2	0	2	5	10	-5	0	Eliminated

Nico Blum (Germany)	5 - 4	(England) Adam Watson
Mike De Decker (Belgium)	5 - 1	(England) Adam Watson
Mike De Decker (Belgium)	5 - 1	(Germany) Nico Blum

==== Group 25 ====
Pos.	Player	P	W	L	LF	LA	+/−	Pts	Status
1	(England) Mark Baxter	2	2	0	10	7	+3	4	Q
2	(England) George Killington (6)	2	1	1	9	5	+4	2	Eliminated
3	(Germany) Christopher Hansch	2	0	2	3	10	-7	0	Eliminated

Mark Baxter (England)	5 - 3	(Germany) Christopher Hansch
George Killington (England)	5 - 0	(Germany) Christopher Hansch
George Killington (England)	4 - 5	(England) Mark Baxter

==== Group 26 ====
Pos.	Player	P	W	L	LF	LA	+/−	Pts	Status
1	(England) Lee Budgen (27)	2	2	0	10	3	+7	4	Q
2	(Netherlands) Jeffrey de Zwaan	2	1	1	8	7	+1	2	Eliminated
3	(Netherlands) Danny van Trijp	2	0	2	2	10	-8	0	Eliminated

Danny van Trijp (Netherlands)	2 - 5	(Netherlands) Jeffrey de Zwaan
Lee Budgen (England)	5 - 0	(Netherlands) Danny van Trijp
Lee Budgen (England)	5 - 3	(Netherlands) Jeffrey de Zwaan

==== Group 27 ====
Pos.	Player	P	W	L	LF	LA	+/−	Pts	Status
1	(England) Jarred Cole (11)	2	2	0	10	5	+5	4	Q
2	(Netherlands) Maikel Verberk	2	1	1	7	8	-1	2	Eliminated
3	(Netherlands) Patrick van den Boogaard	2	0	2	6	10	-4	0	Eliminated

Maikel Verberk (Netherlands)	5 - 3	(Netherlands) Patrick van den Boogaard
Jarred Cole (England)	5 - 3	(Netherlands) Patrick van den Boogaard
Jarred Cole (England)	5 - 2	(Netherlands) Maikel Verberk

==== Group 28 ====
Pos.	Player	P	W	L	LF	LA	+/−	Pts	Status
1	(Netherlands) Justin van Tergouw (22)	2	2	0	10	3	+7	4	Q
2	(England) Callum Loose	2	1	1	5	9	-4	2	Eliminated
3	(Republic of Ireland) Dean Finn	2	0	2	7	10	-3	0	Eliminated

Callum Loose (England)	5 - 4	(Republic of Ireland) Dean Finn
Justin van Tergouw (Netherlands)	5 - 3	(Republic of Ireland) Dean Finn
Justin van Tergouw (Netherlands)	5 - 0	(England) Callum Loose

==== Group 29 ====
Pos.	Player	P	W	L	LF	LA	+/−	Pts	Status
1	(England) Ted Evetts (3)	2	2	0	10	2	+8	4	Q
2	(Netherlands) Kevin Doets	2	1	1	7	9	-2	2	Eliminated
3	(England) Jack Male	2	0	2	4	10	-6	0	Eliminated

Kevin Doets (Netherlands)	5 - 4	(England) Jack Male
Ted Evetts (England)	5 - 0	(England) Jack Male
Ted Evetts (England)	5 - 2	(Netherlands) Kevin Doets

==== Group 30 ====
Pos.	Player	P	W	L	LF	LA	+/−	Pts	Status
1	(England) Scott Dale (30)	2	2	0	10	2	+8	4	Q
2	(Republic of Ireland) Jordan Boyce	2	1	1	5	7	-2	2	Eliminated
3	(Denmark) Nicolai Rasmussen	2	0	2	4	10	-6	0	Eliminated

Nicolai Rasmussen (Denmark)	2 - 5	(Republic of Ireland) Jordan Boyce
Scott Dale (England)	5 - 2	(Denmark) Nicolai Rasmussen
Scott Dale (England)	5 - 0	(Republic of Ireland) Jordan Boyce

==== Group 31 ====
Pos.	Player	P	W	L	LF	LA	+/−	Pts	Status
1	(England) Scott Jackson	2	2	0	10	4	+6	4	Q
2	(Belgium) Kenny Neyens (14)	2	1	1	8	8	0	2	Eliminated
3	(England) Lewis Pride	2	0	2	4	10	-6	0	Eliminated

Scott Jackson (England)	5 - 1	(England) Lewis Pride
Kenny Neyens (Belgium)	5 - 3	(England) Lewis Pride
Kenny Neyens (Belgium)	3 - 5	(England) Scott Jackson

==== Group 32 ====
Pos.	Player	P	W	L	LF	LA	+/−	Pts	Status
1	(Canada) Dawson Murschell (19)	2	2	0	10	4	+6	4	Q
2	(Japan) Tomoya Goto	2	1	1	7	8	-1	2	Eliminated
3	(Republic of Ireland) Dylan Powell	2	0	2	5	10	-5	0	Eliminated

Tomoya Goto (Japan)	5 - 3	(Republic of Ireland) Dylan Powell
Dawson Murschell (Canada)	5 - 2	(Republic of Ireland) Dylan Powell
Dawson Murschell (Canada)	5 - 2	(Japan) Tomoya Goto

=== Knockout Phase ===
Last 32 (best of 11 legs); 5 November
1	(England) Luke Humphries	2
(England) Callan Rydz	6
(Philippines) Paolo Nebrida	6
(England) Tom Lonsdale	4
8	(England) Ryan Meikle	6
(England) Adam Paxton	2
(England) Harry Ward	6
24	(Wales) Rhys Griffin	3
5	(Germany) Martin Schindler	6
28	(England) Rhys Hayden	0
(Germany) Nico Schlund	2
21	(England) Bradley Kirk	6
4	(Netherlands) Geert Nentjes	6
29	(Belgium) Brian Raman	4
13	(Netherlands) Berry van Peer	1
(Wales) Justin Smith	6
2	(Belgium) Dimitri Van den Bergh	6
31	(Netherlands) Melvin de Fijter	3
(England) Thomas Lovely	6
(England) Jack Main	1
(Netherlands) Mike van Duivenbode	6
26	(Austria) Rusty-Jake Rodriguez	4
10	(Germany) Christian Bunse	6
23	(Belgium) Mike De Decker	4
(England) Mark Baxter	4
27	(England) Lee Budgen	6
11	(England) Jarred Cole	6
22	(Netherlands) Justin van Tergouw	3
3	(England) Ted Evetts	6
30	(England) Scott Dale	1
(England) Scott Jackson	6
19	(Canada) Dawson Murschell	4

Last 16 (best of 11 legs); 5 November
(England) Callan Rydz	6
(Philippines) Paolo Nebrida	2
8	(England) Ryan Meikle	3
(England) Harry Ward	6
5	(Germany) Martin Schindler	6
21	(England) Bradley Kirk	4
4	(Netherlands) Geert Nentjes	6
(Wales) Justin Smith	2
2	(Belgium) Dimitri Van den Bergh	6
(England) Thomas Lovely	2
(Netherlands) Mike van Duivenbode	5
10	(Germany) Christian Bunse	6
27	(England) Lee Budgen	6
11	(England) Jarred Cole	3
3	(England) Ted Evetts	6
(England) Scott Jackson	0

Quarter-finals (best of 11 legs); 5 November
(England) Callan Rydz	6
(England) Harry Ward	5
5	(Germany) Martin Schindler	6
4	(Netherlands) Geert Nentjes	0
2	(Belgium) Dimitri Van den Bergh	6
10	(Germany) Christian Bunse	3
27	(England) Lee Budgen	2
3	(England) Ted Evetts	6

Semi-finals (best of 11 legs); 5 November
(England) Callan Rydz	3
5	(Germany) Martin Schindler	6
2	(Belgium) Dimitri Van den Bergh	6
3	(England) Ted Evetts	1

Final (best of 11 legs); 25 November
5	(Germany) Martin Schindler 91.60	3
2	(Belgium) Dimitri Van den Bergh 100.44	6
