= Cam Crabtree =

English darts player (born 2003)

Personal information
- Full name: Cameron Crabtree
- Nickname: "Shazam"
- Born: 21 September 2003 (age 23) London, England
- Home town: Croydon, London, England

Sport
- Sport: Darts
- Playing since: 2020
- Darts: 23g Mission Signature
- Laterality: Right-handed
- Walk-on music: Aquiesce by Oasis

Organisation (see split in darts)
- PDC: 2021–present (Tour Card: 2025–present)
- WDF: 2023–2024
- Current world ranking: (PDC) 69 (5 November 2026)

PDC premier events – best performances
- World Championship: Last 128: 2026
- UK Open: Last 96: 2025
- Grand Slam: Group Stage: 2025, 2026
- PC Finals: Last 32: 2025

Other tournament wins
- Years
| MODUS Super Series Weekly Winner | 2024 |
| PDC Challenge Tour | 2023 (×2) |
| PDC Development Tour | 2025 (×5), 2026 |

Cameron Crabtree (born 21 September 2003) is an English darts player who competes in Professional Darts Corporation (PDC) events. Nicknamed "Shazam", he obtained a PDC Tour Card at 2025 Q-School. Crabtree is a two-time semi-finalist in PDC Players Championship events.

Crabtree won two events on the 2023 PDC Challenge Tour. In youth darts, he has found success in the PDC's youth system, topping the 2025 PDC Development Tour by winning five titles. He added a sixth title at Development Tour 14 the following year.

== Career ==
=== 2022 ===
Crabtree first attended the PDC's Qualifying School in 2022, but failed to gain a Tour Card. In the 2022 PDC Development Tour series he reached a semi-final at event fifteen, which he lost to Keane Barry. He also played on the Challenge Tour, where he hit a nine-dart finish in the penultimate event of the year. He was eliminated in the group stage of the 2022 PDC World Youth Championship.

In November, Crabtree won the Southwark Open.

=== 2023 ===
In 2023, Crabtree won two titles on the PDC Challenge Tour, winning events four and eighteen.

In the 2023 PDC Development Tour series, he finished as the runner-up at event eighteen in mid-July, losing the final to Nathan Rafferty. He was also the runner-up at the final event of the year in August, losing to Luke Littler in the final.

Crabtree received call–ups for 2023 PDC Players Championship series events filling in as a reserve for an absent tour card holder virtue of his ranking on the Challenge Tour Order of Merit. He reached the quarter-finals at events 25 and 30.

Also in July, Crabtree reached the semi-finals of week nine of the MODUS Super Series, but lost there to Jelle Klaasen.

=== 2024 ===
At the 2024 PDC Challenge Tour series, Crabtree reached the semi-finals at event six and the quarter-finals at event seven. Crabtree also made the semi-finals at event eleven.

Crabtree received call–ups for 2024 PDC Players Championship events, filling in as a reserve for an absent tour card holder virtue of his ranking on the Challenge Tour Order of Merit. In early-July, he reached his first PDC Pro Tour semi-final at event thirteen. He beat former PDC major champions Danny Noppert and James Wade on his run to the semis.

In May, Crabtree achieved success on the MODUS Super Series, winning the week seven title.

=== 2025 ===
In January, he won a PDC Tour Card for the first time at PDC Qualifying School, by finishing sixth on the UK Q-School Order of Merit.

Crabtree won his group in the preliminary round of the 2025 PDC World Masters, with wins over Wesley Plaisier and George Killington. He beat Luke Woodhouse in the last 64, but was eliminated in the last 32 by Bradley Brooks 2–0 in sets.

In February, he qualified for his first PDC European Tour event, the 2025 Belgian Darts Open, through the Tour Card Holder Qualifier.

Crabtree made his second UK Open appearance at the 2025 event. He defeated Wesley Plaisier and Andy Baetens 6–1 to reach the third round.

In October 2025, Crabtree confirmed his qualification for the 2025 Grand Slam of Darts having finished top of the Development Tour rankings.

== Personal life ==
Crabtree has a younger brother, Cody, who is also sponsored by Mission and competes in PDC Development Tour events.

He is close friends with fellow PDC Tour Card Holder Owen Bates. The two have travelled together to PDC events.

Crabtree is a supporter of football club Arsenal.

== World Championship results ==
=== PDC ===
- 2026: First round (lost to Andrew Gilding 1–3)

== Performance timeline ==
=== PDC ===
| Tournament | 2022 | 2023 | 2024 | 2025 | 2026 |
|---|---|---|---|---|---|
PDC Ranked televised events
| World Championship | DNQ | | | | 1R |
| World Masters (Note: A non-ranked event until 2025.) | DNQ | | | Prel. | Prel. |
| UK Open | DNQ | | 1R | 3R | 2R |
| Grand Slam | DNQ | | | RR | RR |
| Players Championship Finals | DNQ | | | 2R | |
PDC Non-ranked televised events
| World Youth Championship | RR | 2R | RR | QF | |
Career statistics
| Season-end ranking | – | 119 | 142 | 74 | |

==== European Tour ====
| Tournament | 2025 | 2026 |
|---|---|---|
| Belgian Open | 1R | DNQ |
| German Grand Prix | 2R | DNQ |
| Hungarian Trophy | 1R | DNQ |
| European Trophy | DNQ | 2R |

==== Players Championships ====
| Season | 1 | 2 | 3 | 4 | 5 | 6 | 7 | 8 | 9 | 10 | 11 | 12 | 13 | 14 | 15 | 16 | 17 | 18 | 19 | 20 | 21 | 22 | 23 | 24 | 25 | 26 | 27 | 28 | 29 | 30 | 31 | 32 | 33 | 34 |
|---|---|---|---|---|---|---|---|---|---|---|---|---|---|---|---|---|---|---|---|---|---|---|---|---|---|---|---|---|---|---|---|---|---|---|
| 2023 (Note: Not a Tour card holder) | BAR; 3R | BAR; 1R | BAR; 1R | BAR; 1R | BAR; 1R | BAR; 3R | HIL; 4R | HIL; 2R | WIG; 1R | WIG; 1R | LEI; 1R | LEI; 1R | HIL; 1R | HIL; 1R | LEI; 1R | LEI; 1R | HIL; 2R | HIL; 4R | BAR; 2R | BAR; 2R | BAR; 2R | BAR; 1R | BAR; 1R | BAR; 2R | BAR; QF | BAR; 1R | BAR; 1R | BAR; 1R | BAR; 1R | BAR; QF | | | | |
| 2024 | DNP | | | | | | | | | | HIL; 3R | HIL; 2R | MIL; SF | DNP | | | MIL; 3R | MIL; 1R | MIL; 2R | DNP | | | | WIG; 1R | WIG; 1R | WIG; 1R | WIG; 1R | WIG; 1R | LEI; DNP | LEI; 1R | | | | |
| 2025 | WIG; 2R | WIG; 2R | ROS; 2R | ROS; 1R | LEI; 2R | LEI; 3R | HIL; 3R | HIL; 1R | LEI; 1R | LEI; 3R | LEI; 2R | LEI; 1R | ROS; 2R | ROS; 1R | HIL; 1R | HIL; 2R | LEI; 1R | LEI; QF | LEI; 1R | LEI; 2R | LEI; 3R | HIL; SF | HIL; 2R | MIL; 2R | MIL; 2R | HIL; 1R | HIL; 1R | LEI; 2R | LEI; 2R | LEI; 3R | WIG; 4R | WIG; 1R | WIG; QF | WIG; 2R |
| 2026 | HIL; 3R | HIL; 1R | WIG; 1R | WIG; 2R | LEI; 3R | LEI; 2R | LEI; 2R | LEI; 2R | WIG; 2R | WIG; 2R | MIL; 1R | MIL; 1R | HIL; 1R | HIL; 1R | LEI; 2R | LEI; 1R | LEI; 2R | LEI; 1R | MIL; 1R | MIL; 1R | WIG; 2R | WIG; 4R | LEI; 2R | LEI; 3R | HIL; 1R | HIL; 2R | HIL; 2R | HIL; 2R | ROS; 1R | ROS; 3R | ROS; 2R | ROS; 1R | LEI; 1R | LEI; 3R |

==== Development Tour ====
| Season | 1 | 2 | 3 | 4 | 5 | 6 | 7 | 8 | 9 | 10 | 11 | 12 | 13 | 14 | 15 | 16 | 17 | 18 | 19 | 20 | 21 | 22 | 23 | 24 |
|---|---|---|---|---|---|---|---|---|---|---|---|---|---|---|---|---|---|---|---|---|---|---|---|---|
| 2021 | NIE; 2R | NIE; 3R | NIE; 3R | NIE; 2R | NIE; 3R | NIE; 2R | NIE; 2R | NIE; 2R | NIE; 2R | NIE; 1R | NIE; 3R | NIE; 2R | | | | | | | | | | | | |
| 2022 | WIG; 1R | WIG; 2R | WIG; 1R | WIG; 3R | WIG; 3R | WIG; 2R | WIG; 1R | WIG; 1R | WIG; 3R | WIG; 2R | HIL; 1R | HIL; 5R | HIL; 5R | HIL; 2R | HIL; SF | HIL; 4R | HIL; 4R | HIL; 4R | HIL; 3R | HIL; 4R | WIG; 4R | WIG; 3R | WIG; 1R | WIG; 4R |
| 2023 | MIL; 4R | MIL; QF | MIL; QF | MIL; 2R | MIL; 2R | MIL; 1R | WIG; 2R | WIG; 4R | WIG; 4R | WIG; 3R | HIL; 3R | HIL; 4R | HIL; QF | HIL; SF | HIL; 4R | LEI; SF | LEI; 4R | LEI; F | LEI; 1R | LEI; QF | MIL; 3R | MIL; 3R | MIL; 5R | MIL; F |
| 2024 | MIL; 5R | MIL; 6R | MIL; 1R | MIL; 5R | MIL; SF | HIL; QF | HIL; 5R | HIL; 5R | HIL; 5R | HIL; 4R | DNP | | | | | WIG; 4R | WIG; 6R | WIG; 2R | WIG; 3R | WIG; 5R | WIG; 4R | WIG; QF | WIG; 4R | WIG; 5R |
| 2025 | MIL; QF | MIL; 5R | MIL; SF | MIL; QF | MIL; 5R | LEI; SF | LEI; 5R | LEI; 1R | LEI; 3R | LEI; 4R | HIL; W | HIL; 3R | HIL; W | HIL; 5R | HIL; W | MIL; 6R | MIL; F | MIL; 2R | MIL; W | MIL; 6R | WIG; 2R | WIG; W | WIG; 1R | WIG; 6R |

Performance Table Legend
| W | Won the tournament | F | Finalist | SF | Semifinalist | QF | Quarterfinalist | #R; RR; Prel. | Lost in # round Round-robin; Preliminary round | DQ | Disqualified |
| DNQ | Did not qualify | DNP | Did not participate | WD | Withdrew | NH | Tournament not held | #R; RR; Prel. | Lost in # round Round-robin; Preliminary round | NYF | Not yet founded |
