= Geert Nentjes =

Dutch darts player

Personal information
- Nickname: The Spear
- Born: 4 September 1998 (age 28) Lelystad, Netherlands
- Home town: Urk, Netherlands

Sport
- Sport: Darts
- Playing since: 2013
- Darts: 23g Bull's NL Signature
- Laterality: Left-handed
- Walk-on music: "I Like How It Feels" by Enrique Iglesias

Organisation (see split in darts)
- PDC: 2016–present (Tour Card: 2019–2024)

WDF major events – best performances
- World Masters: Last 272: 2016
- Dutch Open: Last 256: 2026

PDC premier events – best performances
- World Championship: Last 96: 2019, 2020, 2023
- UK Open: Last 32: 2022

Other tournament wins
- Years
PDC Development Tour	2019 (x2), 2022 (x2)

Geert Nentjes (born 4 September 1998) is a Dutch professional darts player who plays in Professional Darts Corporation events. He won 4 titles on the PDC Development Tour.

== Career ==
Geert Nentjes played on the PDC Development Tour for the first time in 2016. Thanks to good performances, he qualified for the 2017 PDC World Youth Championship and reached the Second round on his debut. The following year, Nentjes took part in the Q-School in Hildesheim but was unable to win a Tour Card.

In 2018, he qualified for the 2018 UK Open, but was knocked out in the second round by Darryl Pilgrim.

In November 2018, he qualified for the 2019 PDC World Darts Championship as one of the two the highest ranked players on the PDC Development Tour, along with Ted Evetts.

He reached the quarterfinal at the 2018 PDC World Youth Championship, in which he got beaten 6–0 by Martin Schindler.

As one of the two highest ranked players from PDC Development Tour, he received two years Tour card for season 2019 and 2020. He played both PDC Pro Tour and PDC Development Tour in 2019. Finishing 3rd overall in PDC Development Tour ranking, he secured his sport at the 2020 PDC World Darts Championship, because both the winner and the second, Ted Evetts and Luke Humphries, qualified for the championship via Pro Tour. Nentjes faced Kim Huybrechts in the first round, in a very close match he eventually lost 2–3.

Despite some signs of promise, Nentjes finished 88th on the PDC Order of Merit after his first two years as a professional. However, he won a two-year Tour Card straight back at European Q School at the start of 2021, beating Boris Koltsov 6–5 in the final on day two. On 15 June 2021, he hit a nine-darter against Kirk Shepherd at Players Championship 14.

Nentjes was unable to keep his Tour card again and had to hand it in at the end of 2022. However, he got it back despite by placing 5th on the 2022 PDC Development Tour series Order of Merit, since all players above him qualified for 2023 Tour Card via another method.

== World Championship results ==
=== PDC ===
- 2019: First round (lost to Nathan Aspinall 0–3)
- 2020: First round (lost to Kim Huybrechts 2–3)
- 2023: First round (lost to Leonard Gates 1–3)

== Performance timeline ==
Tournament	2017	2018	2019	2020	2021	2022	2023	2024
PDC Ranked televised events
World Championship	BDO	DNQ	1R	1R	DNQ		1R	DNQ
UK Open	BDO	3R	4R	2R	2R	5R	2R	3R
Players Championship Finals	BDO	DNQ				1R	DNQ	
PDC Non-ranked televised events
World Youth Championship	2R	QF	2R	RR	SF	SF	DNP	
Career statistics
Season-end ranking	NR	122	98	91	123	72	132	110

=== PDC European Tour ===
Tournament	2021	2022	2023
Hungarian Trophy	1R	DNQ	
Gibraltar Trophy	1R	DNQ	NH
Czech Open	NH	1R	2R
European Open	NH	DNQ	1R

=== PDC Players Championships ===
Season	1	2	3	4	5	6	7	8	9	10	11	12	13	14	15	16	17	18	19	20	21	22	23	24	25	26	27	28	29	30
2019	WIG; 1R	WIG; 3R	WIG; 1R	WIG; 1R	BAR; 1R	BAR; 2R	WIG; 1R	WIG; 3R	BAR; 1R	BAR; 1R	BAR; 1R	BAR; 2R	BAR; 2R	BAR; 1R	BAR; 2R	BAR; 3R	WIG; 1R	WIG; 1R	BAR; 2R	BAR; 1R	HIL; 1R	HIL; 2R	BAR; 1R	BAR; 1R	BAR; 3R	BAR; 4R	DUB; 1R	DUB; 1R	BAR; 1R	BAR; 2R
2020	BAR; 1R	BAR; 2R	WIG; 3R	WIG; 1R	WIG; 3R	WIG; 1R	BAR; 2R	BAR; 2R	MIL; 1R	MIL; 1R	MIL; 1R	MIL; 1R	MIL; 1R	NIE; 1R	NIE; 1R	NIE; 1R	NIE; 1R	NIE; 2R	COV; DNP											
2021	BOL; 2R	BOL; 2R	BOL; 1R	BOL; 1R	MIL; DNP				NIE; 2R	NIE; 1R	NIE; 2R	NIE; 1R	MIL; 2R	MIL; 2R	MIL; 1R	MIL; 2R	COV; 1R	COV; 1R	COV; 2R	COV; 1R	BAR; 1R	BAR; 2R	BAR; 2R	BAR; 1R	BAR; 1R	BAR; 2R	BAR; 2R	BAR; DNP		
2022	BAR; 2R	BAR; 1R	WIG; 2R	WIG; 1R	BAR; 2R	BAR; 3R	NIE; 4R	NIE; 2R	BAR; 2R	BAR; 2R	BAR; 1R	BAR; 1R	BAR; 3R	WIG; 2R	WIG; 2R	NIE; 2R	NIE; 2R	BAR; 3R	BAR; 2R	BAR; 2R	BAR; 2R	BAR; 2R	BAR; 3R	BAR; 2R	BAR; 4R	BAR; 3R	BAR; 2R	BAR; 1R	BAR; 1R	BAR; 3R
2023	BAR; 2R	BAR; 2R	BAR; 1R	BAR; 2R	BAR; 3R	BAR; 2R	HIL; 1R	HIL; 2R	WIG; 1R	WIG; 1R	LEI; 2R	LEI; 1R	HIL; 2R	HIL; 2R	LEI; 1R	LEI; 1R	HIL; 1R	HIL; 1R	BAR; 2R	BAR; 1R	BAR; 1R	BAR; 1R	BAR; 1R	BAR; 2R	BAR; 1R	BAR; 1R	BAR; 1R	BAR; 1R	BAR; DNP	
2024	WIG; 1R	WIG; 1R	LEI; 1R	LEI; 1R	HIL; 2R	HIL; 2R	LEI; 1R	LEI; 1R	HIL; 1R	HIL; 1R	HIL; 2R	HIL; 1R	MIL; DNP		MIL; 1R	MIL; 1R	MIL; 1R	MIL; 1R	MIL; 1R	WIG; 1R	WIG; 1R	LEI; DNP		WIG; 1R	WIG; 1R	WIG; 2R	DNP			

Performance Table Legend
W	Won the tournament	F	Finalist	SF	Semifinalist	QF	Quarterfinalist	#R; RR; Prel.	Lost in # round Round-robin; Preliminary round	DQ	Disqualified
DNQ	Did not qualify	DNP	Did not participate	WD	Withdrew	NH	Tournament not held	#R; RR; Prel.	Lost in # round Round-robin; Preliminary round	NYF	Not yet founded
