= 2017 PDC World Youth Championship =

Youth darts tournament

2017 PDC Unicorn World Youth Championship

Tournament information
- Dates: 6 November 2017; 26 November 2017 (final)
- Venue: Robin Park Leisure Centre; Butlin's Minehead (final)
- Location: Wigan, England; Minehead, England (final)
- Organisation(s): Professional Darts Corporation (PDC)
- Format: Legs; First to 6
- Prize fund: £50,000
- Winner's share: £10,000

Champion(s)
- (Belgium) Dimitri Van den Bergh

The 2017 PDC World Youth Championship (known for sponsorship reasons as the 2017 Unicorn World Youth Championship) was the seventh edition of the PDC World Youth Championship, a darts tournament organised by the Professional Darts Corporation (PDC) for players aged between 16 and 23.

The first stages of the tournament were played on 6 November 2017 at the Robin Park Leisure Centre in Wigan, England. The final was played in between the semi-finals and final of the Players Championship Finals on 26 November 2017 at the Butlin's Resort in Minehead, England. The total prize fund was £50,000, with the winner receiving £10,000.

Corey Cadby was the defending champion after defeating Berry van Peer 6–2 in the 2016 final, but he lost 6–3 to Josh Payne in the semi-finals.

Dimitri Van den Bergh became the new World Youth champion, by defeating Josh Payne 6–3 in the final.

== Prize money ==
Position (no. of players)		Prize money (Total: £50,000)
Winner	(1)	£10,000
Runner-up	(1)	£5,000
Semi-finalists	(2)	£2,500
Quarter-finalists	(4)	£1,500
Third round	(8)	£1,000
Second round	(16)	£500
First round	(32)	£250

== Qualification ==
The tournament featured 64 players. The top 46 players in the PDC Development Tour Order of Merit automatically qualified for the tournament. They were joined by 15 international qualifiers. Participation was also granted for Benito van de Pas from the top 32 of the main PDC Order of Merit. The remaining two qualifying places were offered to Junior Darts Corporation representatives.

If an international qualifier was also ranked high enough in the Development Tour Order of Merit to qualify, further places would be allocated from the Development Tour Order of Merit.

The participants were (with the top 8 being seeded):

1-47

1. (Netherlands) Benito van de Pas (PDC Top 32)
2. (England) Luke Humphries
3. (Belgium) Dimitri Van den Bergh
4. (England) Adam Hunt
5. (Belgium) Kenny Neyens
6. (England) Ted Evetts
7. (Netherlands) Mike van Duivenbode
8. (Belgium) Mike De Decker
9. (Austria) Rowby-John Rodriguez
10. (England) Ryan Meikle
11. (Republic of Ireland) Steve Lennon
12. (England) Harry Ward
13. (Germany) Martin Schindler
14. (Austria) Rusty-Jake Rodriguez
15. (Netherlands) Justin van Tergouw
16. (Canada) Dawson Murschell
17. (England) Adam Smith-Neale
18. (England) Josh Payne
19. (Wales) Rhys Griffin
20. (Netherlands) Jeffrey de Zwaan
21. (England) Rhys Hayden
22. (England) Jake Jones
23. (Wales) Kurt Parry
24. (Belgium) Brian Raman
25. (Netherlands) Berry van Peer
26. (England) Ronnie Roberts
27. (Netherlands) Sven Groen
28. (England) Dan Read
29. (Republic of Ireland) Stephen Rosney
30. (England) Scott Dale
31. (England) Thomas Lovely
32. (England) Rob Hewson
33. (Netherlands) Kevin de Vries
34. (England) John Brown
35. (Netherlands) Jimmy Hendriks
36. (Netherlands) Geert Nentjes
37. (England) Reece Colley
38. (England) Joe Davis
39. (England) Lee Budgen
40. (Scotland) Andrew Davidson
41. (Germany) Nico Ziemann
42. (England) Sam Hewson
43. (England) Sam Head
44. (Germany) Christian Bunse
45. (Germany) Nico Blum
46. (England) Conor Mayes
47. (England) Jarred Cole

International qualifiers

- (United States) Dominik Pundt
- (Canada) Keifer Durham
- (China) Qingyu Zhan
- (Australia) Corey Cadby
- (Australia) Adam Leek
- (New Zealand) Kalani Hillman
- (Germany) Max Hopp
- (Netherlands) Melvin de Fijter
- (Hungary) Gergely Lakatos
- (Spain) David Medina Puyol
- (Gibraltar) Jarvis Bautista
- (Denmark) Daniel Jensen
- (Northern Ireland) Nathan Rafferty
- (New Zealand) Jordan Christie
- (Hong Kong) Man Lok Leung
- (Russia) Maxim Aldoshin

Representatives from the Junior Darts Corporation

- (England) Luke Durham
- (England) Jack Ryder

Isle of Man qualifiers

- (Isle of Man) Callum Brew

== Draw ==
=== Preliminary round ===
- (Isle of Man) Callum Brew 0 – 6 Jordan Christie (New Zealand)
- (Netherlands) Sven Groen 6 – 4 Adam Leek (Australia)

=== Finals ===
Quarter-finals (best of 11 legs); 6 November
(Netherlands) Jeffrey de Zwaan	3
(Australia) Corey Cadby	6
5	(Belgium) Kenny Neyens	0
(England) Josh Payne	6
2	(England) Luke Humphries	6
(Germany) Martin Schindler	3
6	(England) Ted Evetts	4
3	(Belgium) Dimitri Van den Bergh	6

Semi-finals (best of 11 legs); 6 November
(Australia) Corey Cadby	3
(England) Josh Payne	6
2	(England) Luke Humphries	5
3	(Belgium) Dimitri Van den Bergh	6

Final (best of 11 legs); 26 November
(England) Josh Payne	3
3	(Belgium) Dimitri Van den Bergh	6

=== Rounds 1-4 ===
First round (best of 11 legs); 6 November
1	(Netherlands) Benito van de Pas	5
(Netherlands) Jeffrey de Zwaan	6
(England) Luke Durham	0
(New Zealand) Jordan Christie	6
(Russia) Maxim Aldoshin	4
(Germany) Christian Bunse	6
(Netherlands) Sven Groen	6
(United States) Dominik Pundt	1
8	(Belgium) Mike De Decker	6
(England) Jake Jones	5
(Netherlands) Berry van Peer	6
(Spain) David Medina Puyol	0
(Belgium) Brian Raman	5
(Austria) Rusty-Jake Rodriguez	6
(Australia) Corey Cadby	6
(England) Sam Head	1
5	(Belgium) Kenny Neyens	6
(Netherlands) Kevin de Vries	4
(Scotland) Andrew Davidson	4
(England) Adam Smith-Neale	6
(England) Joe Davis	0
(Germany) Max Hopp	6
(England) John Brown	6
(Denmark) Daniel Jensen	3
4	(England) Adam Hunt	6
(Gibraltar) Jarvis Bautista	0
(England) Josh Payne	6
(Germany) Nico Blum	4
(Netherlands) Justin van Tergouw	6
(England) Jack Ryder	1
(Hungary) Gergely Lakatos	0
(Austria) Rowby-John Rodriguez	6
2	(England) Luke Humphries	6
(England) Rob Hewson	2
(England) Jarred Cole	6
(Northern Ireland) Nathan Rafferty	2
(Republic of Ireland) Steve Lennon	4
(Wales) Kurt Parry	6
(Hong Kong) Man Lok Leung	2
(England) Rhys Hayden	6
7	(Netherlands) Mike van Duivenbode	6
(New Zealand) Kalani Hillman	3
(Germany) Martin Schindler	6
(England) Lee Budgen	3
(Germany) Nico Ziemann	5
(England) Harry Ward	6
(England) Ronnie Roberts	6
(England) Dan Read	1
6	(England) Ted Evetts	6
(England) Conor Mayes	2
(Netherlands) Jimmy Hendriks	6
(Canada) Dawson Murschell	2
(Canada) Keifer Durham	2
(England) Sam Hewson	6
(England) Thomas Lovely	6
(Republic of Ireland) Stephen Rosney	1
3	(Belgium) Dimitri Van den Bergh	6
(China) Qingyu Zhan	0
(England) Ryan Meikle	2
(Wales) Rhys Griffin	6
(Netherlands) Melvin de Fejter	2
(Netherlands) Geert Nentjes	6
(England) Scott Dale	6
(England) Reece Colley	2

Second round (best of 11 legs); 6 November
(Netherlands) Jeffrey de Zwaan	6
(New Zealand) Jordan Christie	0
(Germany) Christian Bunse	6
(Netherlands) Sven Groen	2
8	(Belgium) Mike De Decker	6
(Netherlands) Berry van Peer	3
(Austria) Rusty-Jake Rodriguez	3
(Australia) Corey Cadby	6
5	(Belgium) Kenny Neyens	6
(England) Adam Smith-Neale	2
(Germany) Max Hopp	6
(England) John Brown	1
4	(England) Adam Hunt	2
(England) Josh Payne	6
(Netherlands) Justin van Tergouw	6
(Austria) Rowby-John Rodriguez	5
2	(England) Luke Humphries	6
(England) Jarred Cole	3
(Wales) Kurt Parry	4
(England) Rhys Hayden	6
7	(Netherlands) Mike van Duivenbode	3
(Germany) Martin Schindler	6
(England) Harry Ward	4
(England) Ronnie Roberts	6
6	(England) Ted Evetts	6
(Netherlands) Jimmy Hendriks	3
(England) Sam Hewson	3
(England) Thomas Lovely	6
3	(Belgium) Dimitri Van den Bergh	6
(Wales) Rhys Griffin	3
(Netherlands) Geert Nentjes	2
(England) Scott Dale	6

Third round (best of 11 legs); 6 November
(Netherlands) Jeffrey de Zwaan	6
(Germany) Christian Bunse	1
8	(Belgium) Mike De Decker	4
(Australia) Corey Cadby	6
5	(Belgium) Kenny Neyens	6
(Germany) Max Hopp	2
(England) Josh Payne	6
(Netherlands) Justin van Tergouw	5
2	(England) Luke Humphries	6
(England) Rhys Hayden	5
(Germany) Martin Schindler	6
(England) Ronnie Roberts	5
6	(England) Ted Evetts	6
(England) Thomas Lovely	5
3	(Belgium) Dimitri Van den Bergh	6
(England) Scott Dale	5

Quarter-finals (best of 11 legs); 6 November
(Netherlands) Jeffrey de Zwaan	3
(Australia) Corey Cadby	6
5	(Belgium) Kenny Neyens	0
(England) Josh Payne	6
2	(England) Luke Humphries	6
(Germany) Martin Schindler	3
6	(England) Ted Evetts	4
3	(Belgium) Dimitri Van den Bergh	6
