= Roman Benecký =

Czech darts player

Personal information
- Nickname: "Beny"
- Born: 20 January 2000 (age 26) Czech Republic
- Home town: Arnultovice, Czech Republic

Sport
- Sport: Darts
- Playing since: 2009
- Darts: 22g Target
- Laterality: Right-handed
- Walk-on music: "Hey Ya!" by Outkast

Organisation (see split in darts)
- BDO: 2016–2019
- PDC: 2019–
- WDF: 2016–2019

WDF major events – best performances
- World Masters: Last 128: 2019

PDC premier events – best performances
- World Championship: Last 96: 2022

Other tournament wins
- Years
PDC Worlds Regional Qualifier	2021
PDC Development Tour	2024
Youth events
Czech Open	2016
Medal record
Men's Darts
Representing Czech Republic
EDU European Ch'ship
Gold medal – first place	2017 Caorle	Boys singles (U18)

Roman Benecký (born 20 January 2000) is a Czech professional darts player who plays in Professional Darts Corporation (PDC) events. He represented his country at the 2018 PDC World Cup of Darts and qualify for the 2022 PDC World Darts Championship.

== Career ==
Benecký started playing darts in 2009, at the age of 9. He first played in soft-tip darts tournaments for a few years and in 2017 he became the EDU European Champion at the U18 category. In the final match he defeated Oguzhan Kaya and took a gold medal. In 2016, he achieved other of his greatest youth's successes by winning the Czech Open Youth's tournament.

In 2018, he quite surprisingly won the qualification for the 2018 PDC World Cup of Darts where he played for the Czech Republic with Karel Sedláček. In the first round doubles match they faced Rob Cross and Dave Chisnall, who defeated them by 3–5 in legs. In 2019, he took part in PDC Development Tour tournaments for the first time. In addition to two rounds of 16, a quarter-final was the best result of the year, which also gave him qualification for the 2019 PDC World Youth Championship. In the decisive group game he was defeated by Nathan Rafferty and thus missed the knock-out rounds.

In 2020, he played in PDC Development Tour and went to the semi-finals later in the year, which guaranteed him a start in the 2020 PDC World Youth Championship. He was eliminated once again in the group stage, by eventual finalist Joe Davis. At the end of 2021, in the final of the Eastern Europe Qualifier tournament he prevailed against Karel Sedláček and therefore qualified for the 2022 PDC World Darts Championship. There he faced Ryan Joyce in the first round match, whom he narrowly lost in the decider. At the Q-School, Benecký was once again unable to earn a tour card, and a little later he made it into the quarter-finals at the PDC Challenge Tour. At the end of March, Benecky advanced to his first two Players Championship.

== World Championship results ==
=== PDC World Championship ===
- 2022: First round (lost to Ryan Joyce 2–3) (sets)

== Performance timeline ==
=== BDO ===
Tournament	2019
BDO Ranked televised events
World Masters	2R

=== PDC ===
Tournament	2018	2019	2020	2021	2022	2023	2024
PDC Ranked televised events
World Championship	Did not qualify				1R	DNQ	
PDC Non-ranked televised events
World Cup of Darts	1R	Did not qualify					
World Youth Championship	DNQ	RR	RR	DNQ	RR	RR	RR
Career statistics
Year-end ranking (PDC)	–	–	–	126	-	–	–

==== European Tour ====
Tournament	2023
Dutch Championship	2R
European Grand Prix	1R

Performance Table Legend
W	Won the tournament	F	Finalist	SF	Semifinalist	QF	Quarterfinalist	#R; RR; L#	Lost in # round Round-robin; Last # stage	DQ	Disqualified
DNQ	Did not qualify	DNP	Did not participate	WD	Withdrew	NH	Tournament not held	#R; RR; L#	Lost in # round Round-robin; Last # stage	NYF	Not yet founded
