= Justin van Tergouw =

Dutch darts player (born 2000)

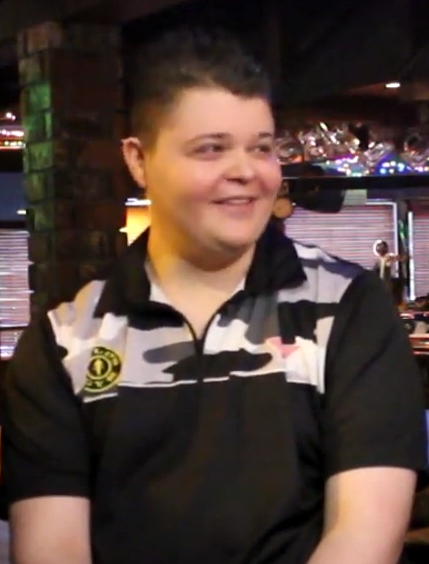
- Van Tergouw in 2019

Personal information
- Full name: Justin Jeremy van Tergouw
- Born: 20 April 2000 (age 26) Utrecht, Netherlands

Sport
- Sport: Darts
- Playing since: 2010
- Darts: 26g Bulls Signature
- Laterality: Right-handed
- Walk-on music: "Amigo" by Chef'Special

Organisation (see split in darts)
- BDO: 2015–2017, 2018
- PDC: 2017, 2019–2023

Other tournament wins
- Years
BDO World Youth Championship	2017, 2018
WDF World Youth Cup	2017
WDF Europe Youth Cup	2016
BDO World Youth Masters	2015, 2016
Zuiderduin Youth Masters	2015, 2016
Belgium Masters	2018

Justin Jeremy van Tergouw (born 20 April 2000) is a Dutch darts player who competed in British Darts Organisation (BDO) and Professional Darts Corporation (PDC) events. He won the BDO World Youth Championship in both 2017 and 2018.

== Career ==
=== Youth career ===
In 2015, van Tergouw won the World Youth Masters, beating Joshua Richardson in the final. In 2016 he won the WDF Europe Youth Cup, as well as the World Youth Masters for the second year in a row. Justin also qualified for the 2016 PDC World Youth Championship through an international qualifier. He lost to Dean Reynolds in the first round. In 2017 he won the BDO World Youth Championship beating Nathan Girvan in the final at the Lakeside Country Club. Later that year he played in the 2017 PDC World Youth Championship where he reached the third round before losing to Josh Payne. In 2018 Justin won the 2018 BDO World Youth Championship, beating Killian Heffernan in the final.

On 5 August 2018, Van Tergouw won Belgium Masters, his first senior BDO title, beating Glen Durrant in the final 2–1 in sets.

== World Championship Performances ==
=== PDC ===
- 2016: First round (lost to Dean Reynolds 0–6) (Youth)
- 2017: Third round (lost to Josh Payne 5–6) (Youth)
- 2018: Second round (lost to Jarred Cole 3–6) (Youth)

=== BDO ===
- 2017: Winner (beat Nathan Girvan 3–0) (Youth)
- 2018: Winner (beat Killian Heffernan 3–1) (Youth)
