= Killian Heffernan =

Irish darts player (born 2002)

Personal information
- Nickname: "Top Shot"
- Born: 10 July 2002 (age 24) Kildare, Ireland

Sport
- Sport: Darts
- Playing since: 2010
- Darts: 22g Target
- Laterality: Right-handed
- Walk-on music: "Hall of Fame" by The Script and Will.i.am

Organisation (see split in darts)
- BDO: 2016–2020
- PDC: 2020–2025

Other tournament wins
- Tournament: Years
- WDF Europe Youth Cup Team: 2019

Killian Heffernan (born 10 July 2002) is an Irish darts player who competed in British Darts Organisation (BDO) and Professional Darts Corporation (PDC) events. He reached the final of the 2018 BDO World Youth Darts Championship.

== Career ==
In 2018 he reached the final BDO World Youth Darts Championship which took place at the Lakeside Country Club in Frimley Green. In September 2017, the Youth tournament was played down to the final two. The final took place on 11 January 2018, he faced Justin van Tergouw in the final, losing 3–1.

In 2019 he won the WDF Europe Cup Youth for Ireland, alongside Keane Barry, Damien Moore and Dylan Slevin. They beat the Netherlands in the final.

Heffernan quit the BDO in 2020 and played PDC Q-School in 2021 but failed to progress to the main round for a chance to earn a tour card.

== World Championship results ==
=== BDO ===
- 2018: Runner-up (lost to Justin van Tergouw 1–3) (Youth) (sets)

=== JDC ===
- 2019: Semi-finals (lost to Lennon Cradock 3–4) (legs)
