= Rusty-Jake Rodriguez =

Austrian darts player (born 2000)

Personal information
- Nickname: "RJR3"
- Born: 24 December 2000 (age 25) Vienna, Austria

Sport
- Sport: Darts
- Playing since: 2012
- Darts: 21g Bull's
- Laterality: Right-handed
- Walk-on music: "Maps" by Maroon 5

Organisation (see split in darts)
- PDC: 2017–present (Tour Card: 2022–2023; 2025–)
- Current world ranking: (PDC) 141 ▼2 (5 November 2026)

PDC premier events – best performances
- World Championship: Last 64: 2022
- UK Open: Last 128: 2023, 2025
- Grand Slam: Group Stage: 2021, 2026
- PC Finals: Last 64: 2021

Other tournament wins
- Years
Hungarian Masters	2016
Youth events
JDC World Championship	2017
Austrian Open	2015, 2016
Czech Open	2015
German Open	2017
Hungarian Classic	2016
Hungarian Masters	2016
Swiss Open	2016
PDC Development Tour (x7)	2017, 2021 (x5), 2023
Medal record
Men's Darts
Representing Austria
EDF European Championship
Bronze medal – third place	2016 Podčetrtek	Men's singles
WDF World Cup Youth
Silver medal – second place	2015 Antalya	Boys' singles
WDF Europe Cup Youth
Gold medal – first place	2017 Malmo	Men's pairs
Bronze medal – third place	2014 Vienna	Men's team
Bronze medal – third place	2017 Malmo	Men's team

Rusty-Jake Rodriguez (born 24 December 2000) is an Austrian professional darts player who competes in Professional Darts Corporation (PDC) events.

In his youth career, he won the 2017 Junior Darts Corporation (JDC) World Championship. He also won seven PDC Development Tours.

== Career ==
Rodriguez won a PDC Development Tour event in 2017, as well as the WDF Europe Youth Cup boys' pairs event with Thomas Langer in the same year. Rodriguez and his brothers Rowby-John and Roxy-James qualified for the 2017 Austrian Darts Open. This was his PDC European Tour debut. He was eliminated in the second round. Rodriguez was the first player to win the JDC World Darts Championship in 2017 after he defeated Owen Roelofs 5–4 in legs.

Rodriguez won five titles on the 2021 European Development Tour, finishing top of the Order of Merit which granted him qualification for the 2021 Grand Slam of Darts and a two-year PDC Tour Card. At the Grand Slam, he played in Group B but went winless in matches against Jonny Clayton, Mervyn King and Bradley Brooks.

Rodriguez made his PDC World Darts Championship debut at the 2022 World Championship, winning his first match 3–1 against Ben Robb. In the second round, he went 2–0 up against Chris Dobey but ultimately lost the match 3–2.

Rodriguez won his seventh Development Tour title in 2023, defeating Dominik Grüllich 5–3 in the final of Event 21. In November 2023, he secured qualification for the 2024 PDC World Darts Championship through the Tour Card Holder Qualifier. He lost 3–0 against Cameron Menzies in the first round.

Rodriguez lost his Tour Card after two years, but following a one-year absence from the PDC Pro Tour, he regained his Tour Card at 2025 Q-School after finishing sixth in the European Q-School Order of Merit.

On 16 September 2025, the Darts Regulation Authority (DRA) confirmed that Rodriguez had been provisionally suspended for a failed drugs test during Players Championship 24. The following month, Rodriguez revealed on Facebook that he was free to return to competition. Issuing a statement on the matter, the DRA stated that Rodriguez had been subjected to a one-month ban for the ingestion of a non-performance-enhancing substance out of competition.

== Personal life ==
Two of his brothers, Rowby-John and Roxy-James, are also darts players. They are of Filipino heritage.

== World Championship results ==
=== PDC ===
- 2022: Second round (lost to Chris Dobey 2–3)
- 2024: First round (lost to Cameron Menzies 0–3)

== Performance timeline ==
Tournament	2017	2018	2019	2020	2021	2022	2023	2024	2025	2026
PDC Ranked televised events
World Championship	Did not qualify					2R	DNQ	1R	DNQ	
UK Open	Did not participate				1R	1R	2R	1R	2R	1R
Grand Slam	Did not participate				RR	Did not qualify				RR
Players Championship Finals	Did not participate				1R	Did not qualify				
PDC Non-ranked televised events
World Cup	Did not qualify								RR	RR
World Youth Championship	2R	2R	2R	2R	QF	RR	RR	RR	DNP	
Career statistics
PDC Year-end ranking	-	149	187	-	77	112	84	-	147	

=== PDC European Tour ===
Season	1	2	3	4	5	6	7	8	9	10	11	12	13
2017	Did not qualify						ADO; 2R	Did not qualify					
2018	Did not qualify							DDO; 2R	DNQ		DDC; 1R	DNQ	
2019	Did not qualify									ADC; 2R	Did not participate		
2022	Did not qualify									HDT; QF	GDO; DNQ	BDO; 3R	GDT; 2R

=== PDC Players Championships ===
Season	1	2	3	4	5	6	7	8	9	10	11	12	13	14	15	16	17	18	19	20	21	22	23	24	25	26	27	28	29	30	31	32	33	34
2021 (Note: Not a Tour card holder)	BOL; 1R	BOL; 4R	BOL; 1R	BOL; 2R	MIL; 2R	MIL; 3R	MIL; 1R	MIL; 1R	NIE; 1R	NIE; 4R	NIE; 1R	NIE; 2R	MIL; 1R	MIL; 2R	MIL; 4R	MIL; 4R	COV; DNP	COV; 2R	COV; 2R	COV; 1R	BAR; 2R	BAR; 4R	BAR; 2R	BAR; 3R	BAR; 1R	BAR; 2R	BAR; 2R	BAR; 1R	BAR; DNP					
2022	BAR; 2R	BAR; 1R	WIG; 1R	WIG; 1R	BAR; 1R	BAR; 2R	NIE; 3R	NIE; 2R	BAR; 1R	BAR; 2R	BAR; 1R	BAR; 1R	BAR; 1R	WIG; 1R	WIG; 2R	NIE; 2R	NIE; 1R	BAR; 1R	BAR; 1R	BAR; 1R	BAR; 1R	BAR; 2R	BAR; 2R	BAR; 1R	BAR; 1R	BAR; 1R	BAR; 1R	BAR; 1R	BAR; 1R	BAR; 1R				
2023	BAR; 1R	BAR; 1R	BAR; 1R	BAR; 1R	BAR; 1R	BAR; 1R	HIL; 3R	HIL; 3R	WIG; 1R	WIG; 1R	LEI; 2R	LEI; 1R	HIL; 1R	HIL; 4R	LEI; 4R	LEI; 3R	HIL; 2R	HIL; 4R	BAR; 3R	BAR; 1R	BAR; 1R	BAR; 1R	BAR; 2R	BAR; 1R	BAR; 3R	BAR; 2R	BAR; 1R	BAR; 1R	BAR; 2R	BAR; 1R				
2025	WIG; 2R	WIG; 3R	ROS; 1R	ROS; DNP	LEI; 2R	LEI; 2R	HIL; 1R	HIL; 1R	LEI; 1R	LEI; 2R	LEI; 1R	LEI; 1R	ROS; 1R	ROS; 1R	HIL; 1R	HIL; 1R	LEI; 2R	LEI; 1R	LEI; 1R	LEI; 1R	LEI; 1R	HIL; 1R	HIL; 1R	MIL; 1R	MIL; 1R	Did not participate							WIG; 1R	WIG; 1R
2026	HIL; 1R	HIL; 1R	WIG; 1R	WIG; 1R	LEI; DNP		LEI; 1R	LEI; 1R	WIG; 1R	WIG; 1R	MIL; 1R	MIL; 2R	HIL; 1R	HIL; 1R	LEI; 1R	LEI; 1R	LEI; 1R	LEI; 1R	MIL; 2R	MIL; 1R	WIG; 1R	WIG; 1R	LEI; 1R	LEI; 1R	HIL; 1R	HIL; 1R	LEI; 1R	LEI; 1R	ROS; DNP				LEI; 1R	LEI; 1R

Performance Table Legend
W	Won the tournament	F	Finalist	SF	Semifinalist	QF	Quarterfinalist	#R; RR; Prel.	Lost in # round Round-robin; Preliminary round	DQ	Disqualified
DNQ	Did not qualify	DNP	Did not participate	WD	Withdrew	NH	Tournament not held	#R; RR; Prel.	Lost in # round Round-robin; Preliminary round	NYF	Not yet founded
