= Nathan Rafferty =

Northern Irish darts player (born 2000)

Personal information
- Nickname: "The Natural"
- Born: 17 January 2000 (age 26) Coalisland, County Tyrone, Northern Ireland

Sport
- Sport: Darts
- Playing since: 2014
- Darts: 23g Red Dragon
- Laterality: Right-handed
- Walk-on music: "This Is the Life" by Amy Macdonald

Organisation (see split in darts)
- PDC: 2016–present (Tour Card: 2022–2025)

PDC premier events – best performances
- World Championship: Last 64: 2023
- UK Open: Last 32: 2018
- Grand Slam: Last 16: 2021
- PC Finals: Last 64: 2022

Other tournament wins
- Years
Northern Ireland Open Youth (×2)	2014, 2015
PDC Challenge Tour	2021 (×1)
PDC Development Tour (×12)	2018 (×1); 2019 (×1); 2021 (×2); 2022 (×5); 2023 (×1); 2024 (×2)

Nathan Rafferty (born 17 January 2000) is a Northern Irish professional darts player who competes in Professional Darts Corporation (PDC) events. Nicknamed "the Natural", Rafferty's best PDC major performance is reaching the last 16 at the 2021 Grand Slam.

In his youth career, he finished as the runner-up at the 2021 PDC World Youth Championship and won twelve Development Tours.

== Career ==
Rafferty made his TV debut at the 2018 UK Open where he beat Jason Mold in the second round, before defeating the defending champion Peter Wright in the third round. He lost to Robert Owen 10–9 in the fourth round.

In 2021, Rafferty picked up his first PDC Challenge Tour title at Event 10. At the 2021 Grand Slam of Darts, Rafferty was drawn into a group with Gerwyn Price, Martin Schindler and Krzysztof Ratajski. He qualified for the knockout stage with wins over Schindler and Ratajski, but was eliminated after a 10–2 loss against Jonny Clayton. Rafferty was the runner-up at the 2021 PDC World Youth Championship, losing 6–4 to Ted Evetts.

Rafferty qualified for his first PDC World Championship after topping the 2022 Development Tour Order of Merit. He won his first round game at the 2023 World Championship 3–2 against Jermaine Wattimena, before losing in the next round to eventual champion Michael Smith.

Rafferty won twelve titles in total on the PDC Development Tour, with his final coming at event fourteen of the 2024 PDC Development Tour series, where he defeated Marvin van Velzen 5–3 in the final.

== World Championship results ==
=== PDC ===
- 2023: Second round (lost to Michael Smith 0–3)

== Performance timeline ==
Tournament	2017	2018	2019	2020	2021	2022	2023	2024	2025
PDC Ranked televised events
World Championship	DNP		Did not qualify				2R	DNQ	
UK Open	DNP	4R	DNQ	3R	2R	1R	4R	1R	3R
Grand Slam	DNQ				2R	RR	RR	DNQ	
Players Championship Finals	DNP		DNQ		DNP	1R	1R	DNQ	
PDC Non-ranked televised events
World Youth Championship	1R	RR	3R	QF	F	2R	3R	QF	DNP
Career statistics
Season-end ranking (PDC)	NR	131	134	174	115	76	70	99	97

PDC European Tour

Tournament	2022	2023	2024
German Championship	1R	DNQ	
European Grand Prix	3R	DNQ	
Hungarian Trophy	1R	2R	DNQ
European Open	DNQ		1R

=== Players Championships ===
Season	1	2	3	4	5	6	7	8	9	10	11	12	13	14	15	16	17	18	19	20	21	22	23	24	25	26	27	28	29	30	31	32	33	34
2020 (Note: Not a Tour card holder)	Did not participate								MIL; 1R	MIL; 1R	MIL; 2R	MIL; 1R	MIL; 1R	Did not participate																				
2022	BAR; 2R	BAR; 1R	WIG; 2R	WIG; 1R	BAR; 1R	BAR; 2R	NIE; 2R	NIE; 1R	BAR; 1R	BAR; 2R	BAR; 1R	BAR; 2R	BAR; 2R	WIG; 2R	WIG; 2R	NIE; 3R	NIE; 3R	BAR; 1R	BAR; 1R	BAR; 1R	BAR; 4R	BAR; 2R	BAR; 2R	BAR; 1R	BAR; 3R	BAR; 3R	BAR; 2R	BAR; 2R	BAR; 2R	BAR; 2R				
2023	BAR; 3R	BAR; 4R	BAR; 1R	BAR; 1R	BAR; 4R	BAR; 2R	HIL; DNP		WIG; 1R	WIG; 1R	LEI; 1R	LEI; 1R	HIL; 2R	HIL; 1R	LEI; 2R	LEI; 1R	HIL; 1R	HIL; 1R	BAR; 1R	BAR; 1R	BAR; 1R	BAR; 1R	BAR; 1R	BAR; 1R	BAR; 1R	BAR; 2R	BAR; 2R	BAR; 1R	BAR; 2R	BAR; 2R				
2024	WIG; 3R	WIG; 1R	LEI; 1R	LEI; 2R	HIL; 1R	HIL; 1R	LEI; 1R	LEI; 2R	HIL; 2R	HIL; 1R	HIL; DNP		MIL; 4R	MIL; 3R	MIL; 2R	MIL; 1R	MIL; 1R	MIL; 1R	MIL; QF	WIG; 1R	WIG; 1R	LEI; 4R	LEI; 2R	WIG; 3R	WIG; 1R	WIG; 2R	WIG; 2R	WIG; 1R	LEI; 1R	LEI; 2R				
2025	WIG; 1R	WIG; 3R	ROS; 1R	ROS; 1R	LEI; 2R	LEI; 1R	HIL; DNP		LEI; 3R	LEI; 1R	LEI; 2R	LEI; 1R	ROS; 1R	ROS; 2R	HIL; 1R	HIL; 3R	LEI; 2R	LEI; 2R	LEI; 1R	LEI; 1R	LEI; 1R	HIL; 2R	HIL; 1R	Did not participate				LEI; 1R	LEI; 1R	LEI; 1R	WIG; 1R	WIG; 2R	WIG; 2R	WIG; 1R

Performance Table Legend
W	Won the tournament	F	Finalist	SF	Semifinalist	QF	Quarterfinalist	#R; RR; Prel.	Lost in # round Round-robin; Preliminary round	DQ	Disqualified
DNQ	Did not qualify	DNP	Did not participate	WD	Withdrew	NH	Tournament not held	#R; RR; Prel.	Lost in # round Round-robin; Preliminary round	NYF	Not yet founded
