= Leighton Bennett =

English professional darts player

Personal information
- Nickname: Boom Boom
- Born: 31 December 2005 (age 20) Lincoln, England

Sport
- Sport: Darts
- Playing since: 2014
- Darts: 18g Target Signature
- Laterality: Right-handed
- Walk-on music: "Boom Boom Boom" by The Outhere Brothers

Organisation (see split in darts)
- BDO: 2019–2020
- PDC: 2021–2024 (Tour Card: 2024)

WDF major events – best performances
- World Championship: Last 32: 2020

PDC premier events – best performances
- UK Open: Last 160: 2024

Other tournament wins
- Years
BDO World Youth Championship	2019
Cambridgeshire Open	2018
WDF Europe Youth Cup Boys Singles	2019
JDC Advanced Tour	2021 (x4)
Newark Open	2023

Leighton Bennett (born 31 December 2005) is an English former professional darts player who competed in Professional Darts Corporation (PDC) and British Darts Organisation (BDO) events. He won the 2019 BDO World Youth Championship. He has received an eight-year suspension from DRA–sanctioned darts events after being found guilty of match-fixing.

== Career ==
=== BDO ===
In August 2018, Bennett won the Cambridgeshire Open, aged 12; in the semi-final, he beat Ricky Evans, before seeing off Rhys Hayden in the final. In October 2018, he booked his place in the final of the 2019 BDO World Youth Darts Championship. He beat Nathan Girvan 3–0 in the Final to become 2019 BDO World Youth Champion. In 2019, Bennett started competing on the men's BDO tour. He reached the Final of the Luxembourg Open and was also a Semi-finalist in the Welsh Open, French Open, German Open, Antwerp Open and Polish Open. Bennett qualified for the 2020 BDO World Darts Championship, becoming the youngest player ever to compete in the Men's tournament. He also became the first player to compete in the Men's tournament and Youth final in the same year.

=== PDC ===
In 2024, Bennett entered the UK Q-School. He made it to stage 2 after making a quarter-final on the third day of stage one. He would go on to automatically win a PDC Tour Card after beating Thomas Cromwell 6–3 in the final on the third day of stage two.

As he had gained a Tour card, Bennett played in the 2024 PDC Players Championship series. At Players Championship 1, Bennett won his first round match against Brett Claydon 6–3. In his second round match against Lukas Wenig in the Players Championships, Bennett hit a nine-dart finish en route to a 6–5 victory. In the third round he was defeated 6–5 by Cameron Menzies. At PC2, Bennett beat Boris Krčmar 6–2 before losing to Jonny Clayton 6–4 in the second round. At PC3, he shocked Dave Chisnall with a 6–1 first round win, then defeated Pascal Rupprecht 6–5 and Arron Monk 6–1 before being defeated in the last 16 by Peter Wright 6–1. At PC4, Bennett played Wright again, but lost 6–5 in the first round.

In August 2024, Bennett was suspended from all DRA events, including PDC events, for allegedly suspicious betting patterns, which breach betting and integrity rules. In December 2024, following a guilty plea, Bennett was banned for eight years.

== World Championship results ==
=== BDO ===
- 2020: First round (lost to Scott Mitchell 1–3) (sets)

=== BDO (Youth) ===
- 2019: Winner (beat Nathan Girvan 3–0) (sets)
- 2020: Runner-up (lost to Keane Barry 0–3)

=== WDF (Boys) ===
- 2022: Semi-finals (lost to Charlie Large 1–2)

== Performance timeline ==
Tournament	2024
PDC Ranked televised events
UK Open	1R

PDC Players Championships

Season	1	2	3	4	5	6	7	8	9	10	11	12	13	14	15	16	17	18	19	20	21	22	23	24	25	26	27	28	29	30
2024	WIG; 3R	WIG; 2R	LEI; 4R	LEI; 1R	HIL; 2R	HIL; 4R	LEI; 1R	LEI; 1R	HIL; 2R	HIL; 2R	HIL; 1R	HIL; 1R	MIL; 1R	MIL; 1R	MIL; 1R	MIL; 2R	MIL; 1R	Did not participate												

Performance Table Legend
W	Won the tournament	F	Finalist	SF	Semifinalist	QF	Quarterfinalist	#R; RR; L#	Lost in # round Round-robin; Last # stage	DQ	Disqualified
DNQ	Did not qualify	DNP	Did not participate	WD	Withdrew	NH	Tournament not held	#R; RR; L#	Lost in # round Round-robin; Last # stage	NYF	Not yet founded
