= Nathan Girvan =

Scottish darts player (born 2002)

Personal information
- Born: 6 November 2002 (age 23) Forfar, Scotland

Sport
- Sport: Darts
- Playing since: 2010
- Darts: 22g Target
- Laterality: Right-handed

Organisation (see split in darts)
- BDO: 2017–2020
- PDC: 2021–

WDF major events – best performances
- World Championship: Runner Up: 2017 (Youth), 2019 (Youth)
- World Masters: Semi Final: 2017 (Youth)
- World Trophy: Last 24 (Qualifiers)
- Finder Masters: Runner Up: 2017 (Youth)

PDC premier events – best performances
- UK Open: Last 96: 2025

Other tournament wins
- Tournament: Years
- Welsh Open Boys: 2017

Nathan Girvan (born 6 November 2002) is a Scottish professional darts player who competes in Professional Darts Corporation (PDC) events. He reached the final of the 2017 BDO World Youth Darts Championship and also in 2019.

== Career ==
In 2016, Girvan topped the Scotland Youth tables after claiming eight titles. In 2017 he reached the final BDO World Youth Darts Championship which took place at the Lakeside Country Club in Frimley Green. The Youth tournament was played in November 2016, in the semifinal he defeated Dutch player Maikel Verberk 4–1, which included a 170 checkout. He faced Justin van Tergouw in the final, he lost 3–0. In October 2018, Girvan booked his place in the final of the 2019 BDO World Youth Darts Championship. He beat England's Connor Arberry 3–2 and played Leighton Bennett in the Final, but he once again lost 3–0. In 2022, Girvan reached the 2022 PDC World Youth Championship final, falling to a 6–1 defeat to Josh Rock.

== World Championship results ==
=== BDO ===
- 2017: Final (lost to Justin van Tergouw 0–3) (Youth) (sets)
- 2019: Final (lost to Leighton Bennett 0–3) (Youth)

=== JDC (Youth) ===
- 2019: Last 16: (lost to Keane Barry 2-4) (legs)
