= Jarred Cole =

English professional darts player

Personal information
- Nickname: "King of the Castle"
- Born: 28 June 2000 (age 26) Welwyn Garden City, England
- Home town: Hatfield, Hertfordshire, England

Sport
- Sport: Darts
- Playing since: 2015
- Darts: 23g Target Signature
- Laterality: Right-handed
- Walk-on music: "King Of My Castle" by Wamdue Project

Organisation (see split in darts)
- PDC: 2016–present
- WDF: 2022–present

WDF major events – best performances
- World Championship: Last 16: 2022

PDC premier events – best performances
- UK Open: Last 128: 2019

Other tournament wins
- Years
WDF Europe Cup Youth Singles	2017
Finder Darts Masters Youth	2017
PDC Development Tour	2018, 2023
Mad World Champion Belt holder	2021

Jarred Cole (born 28 June 2000) is an English professional darts player who competes in World Darts Federation (WDF) and Professional Darts Corporation (PDC) events.

== Career ==
=== 2017 ===
Cole first started his professional career playing in British Darts Organisation and Junior Darts Corporation events. In 2017 Cole managed to pick up three wins on the Junior Darts Corporation UK Tour. Further on in 2017 Cole was also selected to play in the 2017 Finder Darts Masters Youth event for the BDO where he won beating Nathan Girvan 2-0 in the Final as of the 21st of February 2019 this remains Coles only TV title.

=== 2018 ===
Cole played in the PDC Development Tour and on the PDC Pro Tour this year and at the PDC Development tour 16 Cole claimed his first PDC Title. Cole had also won a one year scholarship from the PDPA and JDC to play on the Pro Tour but as this expired at the end of 2018 Cole had to go to Q-School at the start of 2019.

=== 2019 ===
Cole participated in PDC Q-School, where he failed to gain a two-year tour card.

=== 2024 ===
Cole won the WDF England Classic, defeating Canadian Jeff Smith 5-3 in the final.

== World Championship results ==
=== WDF ===
- 2022: Third round (lost to Brian Raman 0–3)

== Performance timeline ==
=== PDC Players Championships ===
Season	1	2	3	4	5	6	7	8	9	10	11	12	13	14	15	16	17	18	19	20	21	22	23	24	25	26	27	28	29	30
2018	BAR; DNP	BAR; 3R	BAR; 1R	BAR; 1R	MIL; 2R	MIL; 1R	BAR; 1R	BAR; 1R	WIG; 2R	WIG; 3R	MIL; DNP	MIL; 2R	WIG; DNP		BAR; QF	BAR; 1R	BAR; 1R	BAR; 2R	DUB; 1R	DUB; 1R	BAR; 3R	BAR; 2R								
2023	Did not participate										LEI; 2R	LEI; 2R	HIL; DNP	HIL; 2R	LEI; DNP		HIL; 1R	HIL; 1R	Did not participate									BAR; 2R	BAR; DNP	
