= Jurjen van der Velde =

Dutch darts player (born 2002)

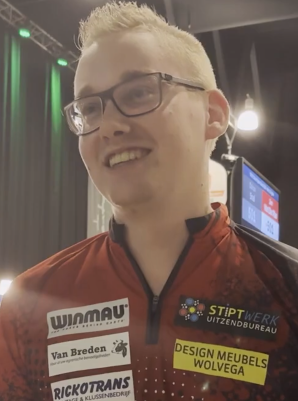
- Van der Velde at the 2025 Dutch Open

Personal information
- Born: 4 December 2002 (age 23) Zevenhuizen, Westerkwartier, Netherlands

Sport
- Sport: Darts
- Playing since: 2015
- Darts: 21g Winmau Signature
- Laterality: Right-handed
- Walk-on music: "Crazy Crazy Nights" by Kiss

Organisation (see split in darts)
- BDO: 2018–2020
- PDC: 2019–present (Tour Card: 2023–2024; 2026–)
- WDF: 2018–2022, 2025
- Current world ranking: (PDC) 99 ▲5 (5 November 2026)

WDF major events – best performances
- World Masters: Last 32: 2022
- Dutch Open: Quarter-final: 2022

PDC premier events – best performances
- UK Open: Last 32: 2025
- Grand Slam: Last 16: 2025

Other tournament wins
- Years
Youth events
| BDO World Masters | 2018 |
| German Open | 2018 |
| JDC World Championship | 2018 |
| Next Talent of Darts | 2018 |
| Toon Greebe Youth Open | 2018 |
| West Fries Open | 2018 |
Medal record
Men's Darts
Representing Netherlands
WDF World Cup
| Bronze medal – third place | 2019 Cluj | Boys singles |
| Bronze medal – third place | 2019 Cluj | Boys pairs |
WDF Europe Cup Youth
| Gold medal – first place | 2018 Ankara | Boys singles |
| Gold medal – first place | 2018 Ankara | Boys team |
| Gold medal – first place | 2018 Ankara | Boys overall |
| Gold medal – first place | 2019 Ankara | Boys pairs |
| Gold medal – first place | 2019 Ankara | Boys overall |
| Silver medal – second place | 2019 Ankara | Boys pairs |
| Silver medal – second place | 2019 Ankara | Boys team |
| Bronze medal – third place | 2018 Ankara | Boys pairs |

Jurjen van der Velde (born 4 December 2002) is a Dutch professional darts player who competes in Professional Darts Corporation (PDC) events and World Darts Federation (WDF) tournaments. He has won titles in the PDC's secondary tours, winning three Challenge Tours and seven Development Tours. He reached the quarter-finals at the World Darts Federation's 2022 Dutch Open.

Van der Velde found success in the British Darts Organisation (BDO)'s youth system, most notably winning the 2018 World Youth Masters. He is also a multi-medalist at WDF boys' events, at both the WDF Europe Cup Youth and WDF World Cup. He also won the Junior Darts Corporation's JDC World Darts Championship in 2018.

== Career ==
Van der Velde was able to win a number of youth titles at the age of 15. The Dutchman made his breakthrough in 2018. He won the 2018 German Open, only losing one leg in the semi-finals, followed by a whitewash victory in the final. He also won the singles competition at the 2018 WDF Europe Cup Youth, defeated Keane Barry in the decider leg. In the team competition and the general classification, he also won a gold medals, and in the pair competition – silver. This was followed by victory at the World Youth Masters, where he again won the deciding leg against Keane Barry. As a result, Van der Velde was invited to the 2018 Finder Youth Darts Masters, but was narrowly eliminated in the group-stage. He ended the year of success with a victory in the JDC World Darts Championship against Lennon Cradock.

In 2019, he was invited by the home federation to participate in the 2019 WDF World Cup for the youth players and to participate in the 2019 WDF Europe Cup Youth. During the WDF World Cup, he won two bronze medals in youth competitions. In the singles tournament, he was surprisingly eliminated in a semi-finals match against Mehrdad Seyfi. During WDF Europe Youth Cup, he won two gold and two silver medals.

In 2019, he also plays at the PDC Development Tour and reached the last 16 on his first weekend. His results throughout the PDC Development season allowed him to take part in the 2019 PDC World Youth Championship. In the tournament, he was joined in his group by Joe Davis and Max Hopp. He was eliminated after losing to both players.

In 2020, he only made the Last 32 in ten events on the Development Tour. At the 2020 PDC World Youth Championship he was eliminated in the group stage after losing to Ted Evetts, finishing second after beating Vilém Šedivý. In 2021, he won his first Professional Darts Corporation Development Tour event and qualified for the 2021 PDC World Youth Championship. His group contained Kevin Doets, Rusty-Jake Rodriguez and Fabian Schmutzler, and Van der Velde lost all three matches.

In early 2022, he qualified for the 2022 UK Open, through his Development Tour ranking, after failing to win a card at PDC Q-School. He defeated Mickey Mansell in the first round 6–4 in legs. In the second round he faced Jim Williams and lost to him 6–3 in legs. At the beginning of May 2022, he had his second victory on the PDC Development Tour before celebrating his first triumphs on the PDC Challenge Tour in July and September. Meanwhile, in June 2022, he participated in the 2022 Dutch Open and was eliminated in the quarter-finals, lost to eventual winner Jelle Klaasen 5–2 in legs.

In November 2024, Van der Velde was defeated by compatriot Gian van Veen 6–5 in the 2024 World Youth Championship final, missing five match darts.

Van der Velde reached the last 32 of the 2025 UK Open, including wins over Bradley Brooks and Keane Barry. He was eliminated by Nathan Aspinall in a 10–2 defeat.

== World Championship results ==
=== PDC ===
- 2026: First round (lost to Danny Noppert 1–3)

== Performance timeline ==
Jurjen van der Velde's performance timeline is as follows:

=== WDF ===
| Tournament | 2022 | 2025 |
|---|---|---|
WDF Ranked televised events
| World Masters | 3R | DNP |
| Dutch Open | QF | 7R |

=== PDC ===
| Tournament | 2019 | 2020 | 2021 | 2022 | 2023 | 2024 | 2025 | 2026 |
|---|---|---|---|---|---|---|---|---|
PDC Ranked televised events
| World Championship | Did not qualify | | | | | | | 1R |
| World Masters (Note: A non-ranked event until 2025) | Did not qualify | | | | | | | DNP |
| UK Open | DNQ | | | 2R | 3R | 2R | 5R | 2R |
| Grand Slam | Did not qualify | | | | | | 2R | |
PDC Non-ranked televised events
| World Youth Championship | RR | RR | RR | RR | 3R | F | 3R | 4R |
Career statistics
| Season-end ranking (PDC) | – | – | – | 216 | 114 | 88 | 104 | |

==== European Tour ====
| Tournament | 2023 | 2026 |
|---|---|---|
| European Darts Open | 1R | DNQ |
| European Darts Grand Prix | DNQ | 1R |

==== Players Championships ====
| Season | 1 | 2 | 3 | 4 | 5 | 6 | 7 | 8 | 9 | 10 | 11 | 12 | 13 | 14 | 15 | 16 | 17 | 18 | 19 | 20 | 21 | 22 | 23 | 24 | 25 | 26 | 27 | 28 | 29 | 30 | 31 | 32 | 33 | 34 |
|---|---|---|---|---|---|---|---|---|---|---|---|---|---|---|---|---|---|---|---|---|---|---|---|---|---|---|---|---|---|---|---|---|---|---|
| 2022 (Note: Not a Tour card holder) | Did not participate | | | | | | | | | | | | | | | | | | | | | | | | BAR; 1R | BAR; 1R | BAR; 1R | BAR; 2R | BAR; 1R | BAR; 1R | | | | |
| 2023 | BAR; 4R | BAR; 1R | BAR; 1R | BAR; 1R | BAR; 2R | BAR; 3R | HIL; 2R | HIL; 3R | WIG; 1R | WIG; 3R | LEI; 4R | LEI; 2R | HIL; 2R | HIL; 1R | LEI; 1R | LEI; 1R | HIL; 1R | HIL; 2R | BAR; 1R | BAR; 1R | BAR; 2R | BAR; 1R | BAR; 2R | BAR; 3R | BAR; 1R | BAR; 1R | BAR; 2R | BAR; 3R | BAR; 2R | BAR; 1R | | | | |
| 2024 | WIG; 1R | WIG; 2R | LEI; 1R | LEI; 1R | HIL; 2R | HIL; 1R | LEI; 1R | LEI; 1R | HIL; 1R | HIL; 1R | HIL; 1R | HIL; 3R | MIL; 1R | MIL; 1R | MIL; 2R | MIL; 1R | MIL; 1R | MIL; 1R | MIL; 1R | WIG; 2R | WIG; 2R | LEI; 3R | LEI; 3R | WIG; DNP | WIG; 2R | WIG; 1R | WIG; 2R | WIG; 1R | LEI; 1R | LEI; 1R | | | | |
| 2025 | Did not participate | | | | | | | | | | | | | | HIL; 1R | HIL; 1R | Did not participate | | | | | | | | | | | | | | | | | |
| 2026 | HIL; 3R | HIL; 1R | WIG; 2R | WIG; 1R | LEI; 1R | LEI; 4R | LEI; 2R | LEI; 2R | WIG; 1R | WIG; 1R | MIL; 2R | MIL; 3R | HIL; 2R | HIL; 2R | LEI; 2R | LEI; 1R | LEI; 1R | LEI; 3R | MIL; 1R | MIL; 1R | WIG; 1R | WIG; 2R | LEI; 1R | LEI; 1R | HIL; 2R | HIL; 2R | LEI; 2R | LEI; 2R | ROS; 1R | ROS; 2R | ROS; 2R | ROS; 2R | LEI; 3R | LEI; 3R |

==== Challenge Tour ====
| Season | 1 | 2 | 3 | 4 | 5 | 6 | 7 | 8 | 9 | 10 | 11 | 12 | 13 | 14 | 15 | 16 | 17 | 18 | 19 | 20 | 21 | 22 | 23 | 24 |
|---|---|---|---|---|---|---|---|---|---|---|---|---|---|---|---|---|---|---|---|---|---|---|---|---|
| 2022 | Did not participate | | | | | L32 | L32 | L32 | L128 | L128 | L256 | L16 | W | L128 | L64 | L128 | QF | W | L128 | L256 | L64 | L128 | L16 | L64 |
| 2025 | L64 | L64 | L32 | L512 | L16 | L64 | L64 | L32 | L128 | L128 | L32 | L32 | QF | L256 | L128 | Did not participate | | | | | L128 | W | SF | SF |

Key

Performance Table Legend
| W | Won the tournament | F | Finalist | SF | Semifinalist | QF | Quarterfinalist | #R; RR; Prel. | Lost in # round Round-robin; Preliminary round | DQ | Disqualified |
| DNQ | Did not qualify | DNP | Did not participate | WD | Withdrew | NH | Tournament not held | #R; RR; Prel. | Lost in # round Round-robin; Preliminary round | NYF | Not yet founded |

== Titles ==
=== PDC ===
- PDC secondary tours
  - PDC Development Tour (7)
    - 2021 (×1): 1
    - 2022 (×1): 7
    - 2024 (×1): 4
    - 2025 (×2): 14, 20
    - 2026 (×2): 1, 3
  - PDC Challenge Tour (3)
    - 2022 (×2): 13, 18
    - 2025 (×1): 22
