= Ryan Meikle =

English darts player (born 1996)

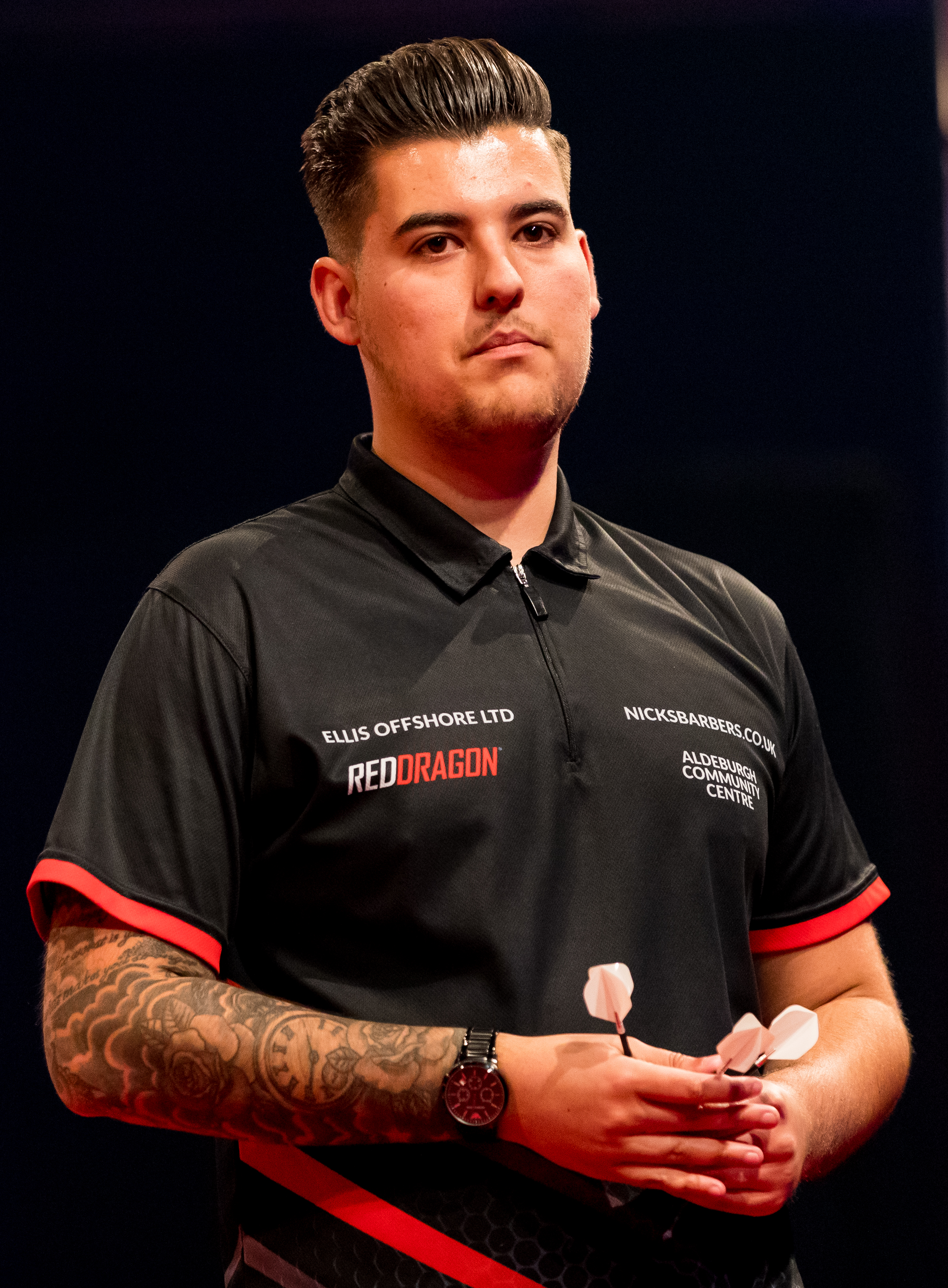
- Meikle in 2019

Personal information
- Nickname: The Barber
- Born: 13 August 1996 (age 30) Ipswich, Suffolk, England
- Home town: Leiston, Suffolk, England

Sport
- Sport: Darts
- Playing since: 2014
- Darts: 22g Red Dragon
- Laterality: Left-handed
- Walk-on music: "This Girl" by Kungs vs. Cookin' on 3 Burners

Organisation (see split in darts)
- PDC: 2015–present (Tour Card: 2016–present)
- Current world ranking: (PDC) 67 ▼2 (5 November 2026)

PDC premier events – best performances
- World Championship: Last 32: 2026
- UK Open: Last 32: 2018, 2024
- European Championship: Last 32: 2022
- PC Finals: Last 16: 2019

Other tournament wins
- Years
PDC Development Tour	2017, 2018, 2019 (x2), 2020 (x2)

Ryan Meikle (/ˈmiːkəl/; born 13 August 1996) is an English professional darts player who competes in Professional Darts Corporation (PDC) events. He reached the last 16 at the 2019 Players Championship Finals.

In his youth career, Meikle won six PDC Development Tours and made the semi-finals at the 2019 PDC World Youth Championship.

== Career ==
Born in Ipswich, Suffolk, Meikle is a barber by trade, hence his nickname of "The Barber". He won a PDC Tour Card by qualifying from the second day of Q–School in 2016.

He made his PDC European Tour debut in the 2016 International Darts Open in Riesa, Germany, where he whitewashed Michael Rasztovits 6–0. He was scheduled to play world number one Michael van Gerwen in the next round, but an ankle injury forced Van Gerwen to withdraw, giving Meikle a bye to round three, where he lost 6–2 to Yordi Meeuwisse.

In 2018, he won his second PDC Development Tour title, defeating Rowby-John Rodriguez 5–3 in the final of Development Tour 11 in Wigan.

Meikle made the semi-finals of the 2019 PDC World Youth Championship but lost 6–3 to Adam Gawlas.

He qualified for the 2020 PDC World Championship where he lost on his debut against Yuki Yamada. He played his last season on the PDC Development Tour in 2020. During his six years on the tour, he has won six PDC Development Tour titles.

Meikle was able to qualify for the 2021 PDC World Championship but again lost in the first round, this time to Keegan Brown, 3–0 in sets.

In his third World Championship appearance, Meikle was able to win his first round match for the first time, defeating Fabian Schmutzler 3–0 in the 2022 edition before losing against Peter Wright 3–0.

At the 2023 World Championship, he defeated Lisa Ashton 3–2 in a deciding set in the first round. He then lost to Raymond van Barneveld 3–1.

Despite failing to win his opening game at the 2023 UK Open and failing to qualify for any further major tournaments, Meikle was able to stay in top 64 of the PDC Order of Merit and continued on the Pro Tour in 2024. He made it to the fifth round of the 2024 UK Open, reaching the last 32 for the first time. He was also able to qualify for the 2024 Players Championship Finals as the fifty-ninth seed. He defeated the sixth seed Gary Anderson 6–5 in a deciding leg in the first round, before losing to Martin Schindler. He qualified for the 2025 PDC World Championship. Meikle defeated Fallon Sherrock 3–2 in the first round but lost to Luke Littler 3–1 in the second round.

== Personal life ==
Meikle is a supporter of Ipswich Town F.C.. He has a son.

== World Championship results ==
=== PDC World Championship ===
- 2020: First round (lost to Yuki Yamada 1–3)
- 2021: First round (lost to Keegan Brown 0–3)
- 2022: Second round (lost to Peter Wright 0–3)
- 2023: Second round (lost to Raymond van Barneveld 1–3)
- 2025: Second round (lost to Luke Littler 1–3)
- 2026: Third round (lost to Justin Hood 1–4)

== Performance timeline ==
Meikle's performance timeline is as follows:

=== PDC ===
Tournament	2015	2016	2017	2018	2019	2020	2021	2022	2023	2024	2025	2026
World Championship	Did not qualify					1R	1R	2R	2R	DNQ	2R	3R
World Masters	Did not qualify										Prel.	WD
UK Open	DNP	DNQ	2R	4R	2R	1R	2R	4R	3R	5R	3R	3R
European Championship	Did not qualify							1R	DNQ			
Players Championship Finals	DNP	DNQ			3R	1R	2R	1R	DNQ	2R	1R	
Non-ranked televised events
PDC World Youth Championship	1R	1R	1R	3R	SF	QF	DNP					
Career statistics
Year-end ranking	-	113	92	81	69	97	60	45	59	60	56	

==== European Tour ====
Season	1	2	3	4	5	6	7	8	9	10	11	12	13	14	15
2016	Did not qualify						IDO; 3R	DNQ							
2017	GDC; 1R	Did not qualify								GDG; 1R	DNQ				
2018	EDO; 1R	GDG; 2R	Did not qualify												
2019	EDO; 1R	Did not qualify									EDM; 2R	IDO; DNQ	GDT; 1R		
2022	DNQ		GDG; 1R	DNQ			EDG; 2R	DDC; 3R	EDM; DNQ	HDT; QF	GDO; DNQ	BDO; 2R	GDT; 1R		
2023	BSD; 1R	EDO; 3R	IDO; 1R	GDG; DNQ	ADO; 2R	Did not qualify									
2024	Did not qualify						DDC; 1R	EDO; 1R	DNQ			SDT; 1R	CDO; DNQ		
2025	Did not qualify						DDC; 2R	EDO; DNQ	BSD; 1R	Did not qualify					
2026	DNQ		BDO; 2R	Did not qualify						HDT	CDO; DNQ	FDT	SDT	DDC	

==== Players Championships ====
Season	1	2	3	4	5	6	7	8	9	10	11	12	13	14	15	16	17	18	19	20	21	22	23	24	25	26	27	28	29	30	31	32	33	34
2016	BAR; 1R	BAR; 2R	BAR; 1R	BAR; 1R	BAR; 3R	BAR; 4R	BAR; 2R	COV; 1R	COV; 1R	BAR; 4R	BAR; 2R	BAR; 1R	BAR; 1R	BAR; 1R	BAR; 1R	BAR; 1R	DUB; 1R	DUB; 2R	BAR; 1R	BAR; 2R														
2017	BAR; 3R	BAR; 2R	BAR; 2R	BAR; 1R	MIL; 1R	MIL; 4R	BAR; 2R	BAR; 1R	WIG; 1R	WIG; 1R	MIL; 1R	MIL; 1R	WIG; 3R	WIG; 1R	BAR; 1R	BAR; 4R	BAR; 3R	BAR; 3R	DUB; 3R	DUB; 1R	BAR; 1R	BAR; 1R												
2018	BAR; 1R	BAR; 4R	BAR; 1R	BAR; 2R	MIL; 1R	MIL; 1R	BAR; 1R	BAR; 1R	WIG; 2R	WIG; 1R	MIL; 1R	MIL; 2R	WIG; 1R	WIG; 4R	BAR; 2R	BAR; 1R	BAR; DNP		DUB; 1R	DUB; 2R	BAR; 3R	BAR; 1R												
2019	WIG; 2R	WIG; 1R	WIG; 2R	WIG; 1R	BAR; 1R	BAR; 3R	WIG; 2R	WIG; 2R	BAR; 1R	BAR; 1R	BAR; 2R	BAR; 1R	BAR; 3R	BAR; 2R	BAR; QF	BAR; 2R	WIG; 2R	WIG; 1R	BAR; 2R	BAR; 1R	HIL; 2R	HIL; 3R	BAR; 3R	BAR; 1R	BAR; 3R	BAR; 2R	DUB; 1R	DUB; 3R	BAR; 1R	BAR; 2R				
2020	BAR; 3R	BAR; 1R	WIG; DNP		WIG; 1R	WIG; 2R	BAR; 2R	BAR; 2R	MIL; 1R	MIL; 1R	MIL; 4R	MIL; 3R	MIL; 1R	NIE; 1R	NIE; 2R	NIE; 1R	NIE; 3R	NIE; 1R	COV; 1R	COV; 4R	COV; 1R	COV; 1R	COV; 3R											
2021	BOL; 1R	BOL; 2R	BOL; 1R	BOL; 3R	MIL; 3R	MIL; 3R	MIL; 2R	MIL; 2R	NIE; 4R	NIE; 1R	NIE; 2R	NIE; 1R	MIL; 2R	MIL; 3R	MIL; 3R	MIL; 3R	Did not participate				BAR; 1R	BAR; 1R	BAR; 1R	BAR; 1R	BAR; QF	BAR; 2R	BAR; 2R	BAR; 2R	BAR; 1R	BAR; 1R				
2022	BAR; 1R	BAR; 4R	WIG; 2R	WIG; 4R	BAR; 1R	BAR; 3R	NIE; 2R	NIE; 2R	BAR; 1R	BAR; 2R	BAR; 3R	BAR; 2R	BAR; 1R	WIG; 4R	WIG; 3R	NIE; 2R	NIE; 2R	BAR; 4R	BAR; 1R	BAR; 2R	BAR; 2R	BAR; 1R	BAR; 1R	BAR; DNP	BAR; 1R	BAR; 1R	BAR; SF	BAR; 1R	BAR; 3R	BAR; 1R				
2023	BAR; 1R	BAR; 2R	BAR; 1R	BAR; 3R	BAR; 1R	BAR; 1R	HIL; 2R	HIL; 2R	WIG; 1R	WIG; 1R	LEI; 1R	LEI; 1R	HIL; 1R	HIL; 2R	LEI; 1R	LEI; 1R	HIL; 4R	HIL; 4R	BAR; 2R	BAR; 1R	BAR; 1R	BAR; 2R	BAR; 3R	BAR; 2R	BAR; 1R	BAR; 1R	BAR; 2R	BAR; DNP	BAR; 2R	BAR; 1R				
2024	WIG; 1R	WIG; 1R	LEI; 3R	LEI; 1R	HIL; 1R	HIL; 2R	LEI; QF	LEI; 2R	HIL; 2R	HIL; 1R	HIL; 3R	HIL; 4R	MIL; 3R	MIL; 2R	MIL; 2R	MIL; 1R	MIL; 1R	MIL; 3R	MIL; 1R	WIG; 1R	WIG; 2R	LEI; 2R	LEI; 2R	WIG; 1R	WIG; 1R	WIG; 2R	WIG; 1R	WIG; 2R	LEI; 4R	LEI; 1R				
2025	WIG; 2R	WIG; 2R	ROS; 2R	ROS; 3R	LEI; 1R	LEI; 3R	HIL; 1R	HIL; 1R	LEI; 2R	LEI; 2R	LEI; 3R	LEI; 1R	ROS; 1R	ROS; 1R	HIL; 1R	HIL; 2R	LEI; 2R	LEI; 3R	LEI; 2R	LEI; 1R	LEI; 4R	HIL; 4R	HIL; 3R	MIL; 1R	MIL; 1R	HIL; 1R	HIL; 1R	LEI; 1R	LEI; QF	LEI; 1R	WIG; 2R	WIG; 1R	WIG; 1R	WIG; 3R
2026	HIL; 1R	HIL; 1R	WIG; 1R	WIG; 2R	LEI; 1R	LEI; 1R	LEI; 3R	LEI; 1R	WIG; 1R	WIG; 1R	MIL; 1R	MIL; 3R	HIL; 1R	HIL; 2R	LEI; 2R	LEI; 3R	LEI; 3R	LEI; 1R	MIL; 2R	MIL; 1R	WIG; 2R	WIG; 1R	LEI; 1R	LEI; 2R	HIL; 1R	HIL; 2R	LEI; 1R	LEI; 1R	ROS; 1R	ROS; 2R	ROS; 1R	ROS; 1R	LEI; 1R	LEI; 1R

Performance Table Legend
W	Won the tournament	F	Finalist	SF	Semifinalist	QF	Quarterfinalist	#R; RR; Prel.	Lost in # round Round-robin; Preliminary round	DQ	Disqualified
DNQ	Did not qualify	DNP	Did not participate	WD	Withdrew	NH	Tournament not held	#R; RR; Prel.	Lost in # round Round-robin; Preliminary round	NYF	Not yet founded
