= 2021 PDC World Youth Championship =

2021 PDC Unicorn World Youth Championship

Tournament information
- Dates: 28 November 2021
- Venue: Butlin's Minehead
- Location: Minehead
- Country: England
- Organisation(s): PDC
- Format: Legs; First to 4 (group stage); First to 5 (knockout phase); First to 6 (Final)
- Prize fund: £45,000
- Winner's share: £10,000
- High checkout: 170 Ted Evetts (semi-final)

Champion(s)
- Ted Evetts

The 2021 PDC Unicorn World Youth Championship was the eleventh edition of the PDC World Youth Championship, a tournament organised by the Professional Darts Corporation for darts players aged between 16 and 23. In a change from previous years, the whole tournament was played at Butlin's Minehead, Minehead, on 28 November 2021. The final took place on the stage, before the final of the 2021 Players Championship Finals.

England's Bradley Brooks was the defending champion after defeating compatriot Joe Davis 6–5 in the 2020 final, but lost 5–3 to Dutch player Kevin Doets in the second round (last 16).

Ted Evetts was crowned World Youth Champion for the first time after defeating Nathan Rafferty 6–4 in the final. As Evetts had already secured his World Championship spot, an additional qualifier was available at the PDPA World Championship Qualifier.

== Prize money ==
The prize fund for the Youth Championship was reduced to £45,000 due to the smaller field of participants, with the winner still receiving £10,000. The winner also gets a spot at the 2022 PDC World Darts Championship and the 2022 Grand Slam of Darts, whereas the Runner-up gets also a place at the 2022 Grand Slam of Darts.

Position (num. of players)		Prize money (Total: £45,000)
Winner	(1)	£10,000
Runner-up	(1)	£5,000
Semi-finalists	(2)	£2,500
Quarter-finalists	(4)	£1,750
Last 16	(8)	£1,000
Third in group	(8)	£750
Fourth in group	(8)	£500

== Qualifiers and Format ==
The smaller field of 32 players was made up of PDC Tour Card Holders, Development Tour players and International Qualifiers. Play in Minehead saw the 32 players compete in a round-robin format during the afternoon in Reds Bar, with the top two players in each group progressing to the last 16. The final was played on the main stage in the evening between the semi-finals and final of the Players Championship Finals.

Mike van Duivenbode, Bence Katona and Nico Kurz withdrew from the original field of qualifiers and were replaced by Lewis Pride, Maikel Verberk, and Jack Male, the next ranked players from the respective UK and European Orders of Merit.

The following players participated:

PDC Tour Card Holders

- Keane Barry
- Bradley Brooks
- John Brown
- Ted Evetts
- Adam Gawlas
- Geert Nentjes
- Callan Rydz
- Ciarán Teehan
- Lewy Williams
- Niels Zonneveld

UK Development Tour Order of Merit

1. Nathan Rafferty
2. Keelan Kay
3. Dom Taylor
4. Reece Colley
5. Liam Meek
6. Jarred Cole
7. Cameron Anderson
8. Joshua Richardson
9. Lewis Pride
10. Jack Male

EU Development Tour Order of Merit

1. Rusty-Jake Rodriguez
2. Fabian Schmutzler
3. Sebastian Białecki
4. Jurjen van der Velde
5. Niko Springer
6. Kevin Doets
7. ~~Mike van Duivenbode~~
8. ~~Nico Kurz~~
9. Maikel Verberk

International Qualifiers

- (Austria) Tobias Fischer – South-East Europe Qualifier
- ~~Adam Leek~~ – Australian Qualifier
- ~~(Hungary) Bence Katona~~ – East Europe Qualifier
- Lee Lok Yin – Hong Kong Qualifier
- Shusaku Nakamura – Japan Qualifier
- (Spain) Victor Manuel Rodriguez – South-West Europe Qualifier
- (Netherlands) Owen Roelofs – West Europe Qualifier

=== Seedings ===
The top eight ranked players from the PDC Order of Merit are seeded at the time of the draw.

1. Callan Rydz
2. Bradley Brooks
3. Ted Evetts
4. Keane Barry
5. Ciarán Teehan
6. Lewy Williams
7. Rusty-Jake Rodriguez
8. Adam Gawlas

== Draw ==
=== Group stage ===
All group matches are best of seven legs
After three games, the top two in each group qualify for the knock-out stage

NB: P = Played; W = Won; L = Lost; LF = Legs for; LA = Legs against; +/− = Plus/minus record, in relation to legs; Pts = Points; Avg = Three-dart average in group matches; Status = Qualified to knockout stage

==== Group A ====
Standings Table
Pos.	Player	P	W	L	LF	LA	+/−	Avg	Pts	Status
1	Jack Male (Alt)	3	3	0	12	4	+8	81.23	6	Q
2	Callan Rydz (1)	3	2	1	9	5	+4	85.73	4	Q
3	(Netherlands) Owen Roelofs (Q)	3	1	2	7	11	–4	87.51	2	
4	John Brown	3	0	3	4	12	–8	78.83	0	

Jack Male (82.14)	4–2	(Netherlands) Owen Roelofs (87.39)
Callan Rydz (87.13)	4–0	John Brown (72.29)
John Brown (82.90)	3–4	(Netherlands) Owen Roelofs (82.56)
Callan Rydz (75.94)	1–4	Jack Male (81.92)
John Brown (81.29)	1–4	Jack Male (79.64)
Callan Rydz (94.11)	4–1	(Netherlands) Owen Roelofs (92.59)

==== Group B ====
Standings Table
Pos.	Player	P	W	L	LF	LA	+/−	Avg	Pts	Status
1	Adam Gawlas (8)	3	3	0	12	4	+8	96.78	6	Q
2	Nathan Rafferty	3	2	1	10	7	+3	87.18	4	Q
3	Reece Colley	3	1	2	9	10	–1	90.62	2	
4	Joshua Richardson	0	0	3	2	12	–10	80.84	0	

Nathan Rafferty (81.24)	4–0	Joshua Richardson (79.09)
Adam Gawlas (99.82)	4–2	Reece Colley (93.77)
Reece Colley (86.54)	4–2	Joshua Richardson (88.63)
Adam Gawlas (90.31)	4–2	Nathan Rafferty (94.79)
Nathan Rafferty (85.50)	4–3	Reece Colley (91.55)
Adam Gawlas (100.20)	4–0	Joshua Richardson (74.79)

==== Group C ====
Standings Table
Pos.	Player	P	W	L	LF	LA	+/−	Avg	Pts	Status
1	Liam Meek	3	3	0	12	5	+7	87.88	6	Q
2	Keane Barry (4)	3	2	1	10	9	+1	84.58	4	Q
3	Shusaku Nakamura (Q)	3	1	2	9	10	–1	79.50	2	
4	Jarred Cole	0	0	3	5	12	–7	86.60	0	

Jarred Cole (91.80)	2–4	Shusaku Nakamura (80.56)
Keane Barry (87.70)	2–4	Liam Meek (86.84)
Liam Meek (86.24)	4–2	Shusaku Nakamura (81.73)
Keane Barry (87.67)	4–2	Jarred Cole (86.57)
Liam Meek (90.56)	4–1	Jarred Cole (81.42)
Keane Barry (78.37)	4–3	Shusaku Nakamura (76.22)

==== Group D ====
Standings Table
Pos.	Player	P	W	L	LF	LA	+/−	Avg	Pts	Status
1	Ciarán Teehan (5)	3	3	0	12	6	+6	85.46	6	Q
2	Geert Nentjes	3	2	1	9	7	+2	89.29	4	Q
3	Dom Taylor	3	1	2	10	10	0	81.24	2	
4	(Spain) Victor Manuel Rodriguez (Q)	3	0	3	4	12	–8	75.17	0	

Geert Nentjes (93.94)	4–0	(Spain) Victor Manuel Rodriguez (74.10)
Ciarán Teehan (78.64)	4–3	Dom Taylor (79.94)
Dom Taylor (80.86)	4–2	(Spain) Victor Manuel Rodriguez (72.79)
Ciarán Teehan (89.10)	4–1	Geert Nentjes (84.85)
Geert Nentjes (89.09)	4–3	Dom Taylor (82.93)
Ciarán Teehan (88.63)	4–2	(Spain) Victor Manuel Rodriguez (78.63)

==== Group E ====
Standings Table
Pos.	Player	P	W	L	LF	LA	+/−	Avg	Pts	Status
1	Bradley Brooks (2)	3	3	0	12	6	+6	80.78	6	Q
2	Lewis Pride (Alt)	3	2	1	9	7	+2	79.97	4	Q
3	Lee Lok Yin (Q)	3	1	2	9	8	+1	71.98	2	
4	(Austria) Tobias Fischer (Q)	3	0	3	3	12	–9	64.03	0	

Lee Lok Yin (65.35)	4–0	(Austria) Tobias Fischer (56.47)
Bradley Brooks (72.82)	4–1	Lewis Pride (67.91)
Lewis Pride (91.09)	4–0	(Austria) Tobias Fischer (67.62)
Bradley Brooks (91.81)	4–2	Lee Lok Yin (79.78)
Lewis Pride (80.90)	4–3	Lee Lok Yin (70.80)
Bradley Brooks (77.72)	4–3	(Austria) Tobias Fischer (67.99)

==== Group F ====
Standings Table
Pos.	Player	P	W	L	LF	LA	+/−	Avg	Pts	Status
1	Rusty-Jake Rodriguez (7)	3	3	0	12	6	+6	87.67	6	Q
2	Kevin Doets	3	2	1	9	6	+3	92.75	4	Q
3	Fabian Schmutzler	3	1	2	7	11	–4	85.55	2	
4	Jurjen van der Velde	3	0	3	7	12	–5	87.59	0	

Fabian Schmutzler (77.24)	4–3	Jurjen van der Velde (74.89)
Rusty-Jake Rodriguez (82.38)	4–1	Kevin Doets (80.80)
Jurjen van der Velde (91.13)	2–4	Kevin Doets (90.10)
Rusty-Jake Rodriguez (83.43)	4–3	Fabian Schmutzler (87.13)
Fabian Schmutzler (92.28)	0–4	Kevin Doets (107.36)
Rusty-Jake Rodriguez (97.19)	4–2	Jurjen van der Velde (96.76)

==== Group G ====
Standings Table
Pos.	Player	P	W	L	LF	LA	+/−	Avg	Pts	Status
1	Ted Evetts (3)	3	3	0	12	6	+6	88.24	6	Q
2	Keelan Kay	3	2	1	9	4	+5	84.45	4	Q
3	Niko Springer	3	1	2	7	9	–2	87.08	2	
4	Sebastian Białecki	3	0	3	3	12	–9	82.82	0	

Keelan Kay (82.36)	4–0	Sebastian Białecki (79.17)
Ted Evetts (94.34)	4–3	Niko Springer (84.16)
Sebastian Białecki (88.09)	1–4	Niko Springer (90.19)
Ted Evetts (82.17)	4–1	Keelan Kay (82.59)
Keelan Kay (88.41)	4–0	Niko Springer (86.90)
Ted Evetts (88.21)	4–2	Sebastian Białecki (81.21)

==== Group H ====
Standings Table
Pos.	Player	P	W	L	LF	LA	+/−	Avg	Pts	Status
1	Lewy Williams (6)	3	3	0	12	3	+9	88.63	6	Q
2	Niels Zonneveld	3	2	1	8	6	+2	89.37	4	Q
3	Maikel Verberk (Alt)	3	1	2	8	11	–3	86.66	2	
4	Cameron Anderson	3	0	3	4	12	–8	81.10	0	

Cameron Anderson (93.14)	3–4	Maikel Verberk (85.73)
Lewy Williams (92.49)	4–0	Niels Zonneveld (76.19)
Niels Zonneveld (100.20)	4–0	Cameron Anderson (78.37)
Lewy Williams (92.30)	4–2	Maikel Verberk (88.68)
Niels Zonneveld (91.71)	4–2	Maikel Verberk (85.56)
Lewy Williams (81.10)	4–1	Cameron Anderson (71.80)

=== Knockout stage ===
Second round (best of 9 legs)
A1	Jack Male (Alt) 84.38	0
B2	Nathan Rafferty 98.88	5
B1	Adam Gawlas (8) 89.62	5
A2	Callan Rydz (1) 88.55	4
C1	Liam Meek 95.72	2
D2	Geert Nentjes 101.02	5
D1	Ciarán Teehan (5) 86.12	1
C2	Keane Barry (4) 89.53	5
E1	Bradley Brooks (2) 92.68	3
F2	Kevin Doets 103.99	5
F1	Rusty-Jake Rodriguez (7) 97.36	5
E2	Lewis Pride (Alt) 91.35	1
G1	Ted Evetts (3) 97.60	5
H2	Niels Zonneveld 82.83	0
H1	Lewy Williams (6) 88.30	1
G2	Keelan Kay 89.53	5

Quarter-finals (best of 9 legs)
B2	Nathan Rafferty 94.26	5
B1	Adam Gawlas (8) 85.28	4
D2	Geert Nentjes 85.32	5
C2	Keane Barry (4) 91.55	3
F2	Kevin Doets 92.19	5
F1	Rusty-Jake Rodriguez (7) 81.65	1
G1	Ted Evetts (3) 94.76	5
G2	Keelan Kay 82.31	3

Semi-finals (best of 9 legs)
B2	Nathan Rafferty 99.82	5
D2	Geert Nentjes 84.72	3
F2	Kevin Doets 80.03	1
G1	Ted Evetts (3) 89.42	5

Final (best of 11 legs)
B2	Nathan Rafferty 93.66	4
G1	Ted Evetts (3) 95.44	6

== Representation ==
This table shows the number of players by country in the 2022 PDC World Youth Championship. A total of 12 nationalities were represented.

	(England) ENG	(Netherlands) NED	(Republic of Ireland) IRL	(Austria) AUT	(Wales) WAL	(Germany) GER	(Northern Ireland) NIR	(Czech Republic) CZE	(Poland) POL	(Hong Kong) HKG	(Japan) JPN	(Spain) SPA	Total
Final	1	—N/a					1	—N/a					2
Semi-finals	1	2	—N/a				1	—N/a					4
Quarter-finals	2	2	1	1	—N/a		1	1	—N/a				8
Second round	6	3	2	1	2	—N/a	1	1	—N/a				16
Group stage	12	6	2	2	2	2	1	1	1	1	1	1	32
Total	12	6	2	2	2	2	1	1	1	1	1	1	32
