= Ted Evetts =

English darts player (born 1997)

Personal information
- Nickname: Super Ted
- Born: 3 August 1997 (age 29) Southam, Warwickshire, England
- Home town: Stockton, Warwickshire, England

Sport
- Sport: Darts
- Playing since: 2013
- Darts: 23g Unicorn Signature
- Laterality: Right-handed
- Walk-on music: "Country Roads" by Hermes House Band

Organisation (see split in darts)
- PDC: 2014–present (Tour Card: 2016–2017, 2019–2023)
- Current world ranking: (PDC) 161 ▼1 (18 October 2026)

WDF major events – best performances
- World Masters: Last 80: 2015

PDC premier events – best performances
- World Championship: Last 64: 2018, 2019
- UK Open: Last 32: 2017, 2023
- Grand Slam: Group Stage: 2016, 2022
- European Championship: Last 32: 2019, 2021
- PC Finals: Last 64: 2019

Other tournament wins
- Years
| PDC Challenge Tour | 2018 (x2), 2025 |
| PDC Development Tour | 2017, 2018 (x3), 2019 (x8), 2020, 2021 |
| PDC World Youth Championship | 2021 |

Ted Evetts (born 3 August 1997) is an English darts player who competes in Professional Darts Corporation (PDC) events. He is a former World Youth champion, having won the 2021 PDC World Youth Championship. During his youth career, he won a total of 14 PDC Development Tours, making him one of the most successful players in the history of the PDC's youth system. He has competed at five PDC World Championships, most notably losing to female player Fallon Sherrock in the first round of the 2020 event.

== Career ==
After competing on the PDC Development Tour in 2014 and 2015, Evetts gained a PDC Tour Card on the second day of 2016 Q-School. Evetts was a qualifier for the 2016 Grand Slam of Darts, which was his first televised event. He lost all of three of his group games.

Evetts went on to hit the first nine-dart finish on the 2017 PDC Pro Tour. He qualified for the 2018 PDC World Darts Championship, losing in the first round to Gerwyn Price.

Evetts won his first PDC World Championship match in the first round of the 2019 edition when he defeated Simon Stevenson 3–0. He lost 0–3 to Adrian Lewis in the next round. Evetts reached his first senior quarter-final at the 2019 German Darts Grand Prix. He beat Mark Wilson, Jonny Clayton and Ricky Evans before losing to eventual winner Michael van Gerwen 6–5.

On 17 December 2019, Evetts lost to Fallon Sherrock at the 2020 PDC World Darts Championship in the first round. This was the first time a woman won at the PDC World Championship, and Evetts was praised by the presenting team and on social media for his gracious reaction.

At the age of 24, Evetts won the 2021 PDC World Youth Championship after defeating Nathan Rafferty 6–4 in the final. It was his seventh and final year competing in the event before exceeding the age limit. He entered the 2022 PDC World Championship in need of a minimum of two wins to keep his Tour Card, but suffered a 3–1 loss to Jim Williams in the first round. He regained his Tour Card at 2022 Q-School.

Evetts lost his Tour Card at the end of 2023. He reached the quarter-finals of Players Championship 24 on the 2024 PDC Pro Tour as a reserve player, where he was beaten by Stephen Bunting in a deciding leg. In 2025, Evetts won his third PDC Challenge Tour title by defeating Michael Unterbuchner 5–1 in the final of event nine. He finished third on the 2025 Challenge Tour Order of Merit ranking, which secured him qualification for the 2026 PDC World Championship.

== Personal life ==
Evetts was the subject of a PDC documentary titled Ted Evetts - On the Other Side of History, released in July 2021, in which he was interviewed about his career and his loss to Fallon Sherrock at the 2020 PDC World Championship. He praised Sherrock, who he had known for years prior to the match. He also shed light on the abuse he received on social media in the aftermath of the defeat, recounting that he "must have had probably well over 1,000 messages of pure hate".

Outside of darts, Evetts is a qualified chef.

== World Championship results ==
=== PDC World Championship ===
- 2018: First round (lost to Gerwyn Price 0–3)
- 2019: Second round (lost to Adrian Lewis 0–3)
- 2020: First round (lost to Fallon Sherrock 2–3)
- 2022: First round (lost to Jim Williams 1–3)
- 2026: First round (lost to Luke Humphries 1–3)

== Performance timeline ==
=== BDO ===
| Tournament | 2015 |
|---|---|
BDO Ranked televised events
| World Masters | 3R |

=== PDC ===
| Tournament | 2015 | 2016 | 2017 | 2018 | 2019 | 2020 | 2021 | 2022 | 2023 | 2024 | 2025 | 2026 |
|---|---|---|---|---|---|---|---|---|---|---|---|---|
PDC Ranked televised events
| World Championship | Did not qualify | | | 1R | 2R | 1R | DNQ | 1R | DNQ | | | 1R |
| UK Open | DNQ | | 4R | 2R | 2R | 3R | 3R | 3R | 5R | DNP | | 1R |
| European Championship | Did not qualify | | | | 1R | DNQ | 1R | DNQ | | DNP | | |
| Grand Slam | DNQ | RR | Did not qualify | | | | | RR | DNQ | | | |
| Players Championship Finals | Did not qualify | | | | 1R | Did not qualify | | | | | | |
PDC Non-ranked televised events
| World Youth Championship | 2R | QF | QF | SF | 3R | 2R | W | DNP | | | | |
Career statistics
| Year-end ranking | – | 115 | 81 | 76 | 81 | 60 | 75 | 102 | 81 | 150 | 115 | |

==== European Tour ====
| Season | 1 | 2 | 3 | 4 | 5 | 6 | 7 | 8 | 9 | 10 | 11 | 12 | 13 |
|---|---|---|---|---|---|---|---|---|---|---|---|---|---|
| 2016 | Did not qualify | | | | | | | | | GDC; 2R | | | |
| 2017 | GDC; DNQ | GDM; 2R | Did not qualify | | | | | | | IDO; 1R | EDT; DNQ | | |
| 2018 | Did not qualify | | | | | | | DDO; 1R | EDM; DNQ | GDC; 1R | DNQ | | |
| 2019 | EDO; 2R | GDC; DNQ | GDG; QF | GDO; 2R | Did not qualify | | | | CDO; 3R | ADC; 1R | DNQ | | |
| 2021 | HDT; DNQ | GDT; 3R | | | | | | | | | | | |
| 2022 | IDO; DNQ | GDC; WD | Did not qualify | | | CDO; 1R | Did not qualify | | | HDT; 1R | DNQ | | |
| 2023 | BSD; 2R | EDO; 2R | Did not qualify | | | | BDO; 2R | DNQ | | EDM; 1R | DNQ | | |

==== Players Championships ====
| Season | 1 | 2 | 3 | 4 | 5 | 6 | 7 | 8 | 9 | 10 | 11 | 12 | 13 | 14 | 15 | 16 | 17 | 18 | 19 | 20 | 21 | 22 | 23 | 24 | 25 | 26 | 27 | 28 | 29 | 30 | 31 | 32 | 33 | 34 |
|---|---|---|---|---|---|---|---|---|---|---|---|---|---|---|---|---|---|---|---|---|---|---|---|---|---|---|---|---|---|---|---|---|---|---|
| 2016 | BAR; 2R | BAR; 2R | BAR; 1R | BAR; 2R | BAR; 1R | BAR; 1R | BAR; 2R | COV; 1R | COV; 2R | BAR; 1R | BAR; 2R | BAR; 1R | BAR; 1R | BAR; 3R | BAR; 1R | BAR; 3R | DUB; 1R | DUB; 1R | BAR; 1R | BAR; 2R | | | | | | | | | | | | | | |
| 2017 | BAR; 1R | BAR; 4R | BAR; 2R | BAR; 2R | MIL; 1R | MIL; 2R | BAR; 1R | BAR; 1R | WIG; 4R | WIG; 2R | MIL; 2R | MIL; 1R | WIG; 3R | WIG; 1R | BAR; 2R | BAR; 1R | BAR; 4R | BAR; 1R | DUB; 1R | DUB; 1R | BAR; 1R | BAR; 1R | | | | | | | | | | | | |
| 2018 (Note: Not a Tour card holder) | Did not participate | | | | | | BAR; 1R | BAR; 1R | WIG; 1R | WIG; 3R | MIL; 1R | MIL; 1R | WIG; 1R | WIG; 2R | BAR; 2R | BAR; 2R | BAR; DNP | | DUB; 2R | DUB; 1R | BAR; 2R | BAR; 2R | | | | | | | | | | | | |
| 2019 | WIG; 2R | WIG; 1R | WIG; 2R | WIG; 2R | BAR; 3R | BAR; 2R | WIG; 2R | WIG; 1R | BAR; 3R | BAR; 2R | BAR; 1R | BAR; 3R | BAR; 2R | BAR; 3R | BAR; 2R | BAR; 2R | WIG; 2R | WIG; 3R | BAR; 1R | BAR; 1R | HIL; 3R | HIL; 1R | BAR; 1R | BAR; 1R | BAR; 1R | BAR; 1R | DUB; 4R | DUB; 1R | BAR; 1R | BAR; 1R | | | | |
| 2020 | BAR; 2R | BAR; 1R | WIG; 4R | WIG; 1R | WIG; 1R | WIG; 2R | BAR; 2R | BAR; 1R | MIL; 1R | MIL; 2R | MIL; 1R | MIL; 1R | MIL; 1R | NIE; 2R | NIE; 1R | NIE; 2R | NIE; 2R | NIE; 1R | COV; 1R | COV; 1R | COV; 3R | COV; 1R | COV; 1R | | | | | | | | | | | |
| 2021 | BOL; 4R | BOL; 1R | BOL; 1R | BOL; 3R | MIL; 1R | MIL; 1R | MIL; 2R | MIL; 1R | NIE; 1R | NIE; 1R | NIE; 1R | NIE; 4R | MIL; 1R | MIL; QF | MIL; 1R | MIL; 2R | COV; 1R | COV; 2R | COV; 2R | COV; 1R | BAR; 2R | BAR; 2R | BAR; 2R | BAR; 1R | BAR; 1R | BAR; 2R | BAR; 1R | BAR; 1R | BAR; 1R | BAR; 1R | | | | |
| 2022 | BAR; 2R | BAR; 1R | WIG; 1R | WIG; 1R | BAR; 1R | BAR; 1R | NIE; 3R | NIE; 2R | BAR; 2R | BAR; 1R | BAR; 1R | BAR; 1R | BAR; 1R | WIG; 1R | WIG; 1R | NIE; 2R | NIE; 2R | BAR; 1R | BAR; 1R | BAR; 1R | BAR; 1R | BAR; 2R | BAR; SF | BAR; 2R | BAR; 2R | BAR; 1R | BAR; 2R | BAR; 4R | BAR; 1R | BAR; 1R | | | | |
| 2023 | BAR; 2R | BAR; 1R | BAR; 2R | BAR; 1R | BAR; 1R | BAR; 2R | HIL; 1R | HIL; 2R | WIG; 2R | WIG; 1R | LEI; 1R | LEI; 1R | HIL; 1R | HIL; 2R | LEI; 1R | LEI; 3R | HIL; 1R | HIL; 1R | BAR; 1R | BAR; 3R | BAR; 1R | BAR; 1R | BAR; 2R | BAR; 1R | BAR; 1R | BAR; 1R | BAR; 1R | BAR; 1R | BAR; 1R | BAR; 1R | | | | |
| 2024 | Did not participate | | | | | | | | | | | | | | | | | | | | | | | WIG; QF | WIG; DNP | | | WIG; 2R | LEI; DNP | | | | | |
| 2025 | WIG; 1R | Did not participate | | | | | HIL; 1R | HIL; 4R | LEI; 1R | LEI; 1R | LEI; 2R | LEI; 1R | ROS; 3R | ROS; 1R | HIL; 2R | HIL; 1R | LEI; 1R | LEI; 2R | LEI; 1R | LEI; 2R | LEI; 1R | HIL; 1R | HIL; 1R | MIL; 1R | MIL; 2R | HIL; 1R | HIL; 1R | LEI; 1R | LEI; 1R | LEI; 1R | WIG; 1R | WIG; 2R | WIG; 1R | WIG; 1R |
| 2026 | Did not participate | | | | | | | | WIG; 1R | WIG; 2R | Did not participate | | | | LEI; 1R | Did not participate | | | | | | | | | HIL; 2R | HIL; 1R | LEI; DNP | LEI; 1R | ROS | ROS | ROS | ROS | LEI | LEI |

Performance Table Legend
| W | Won the tournament | F | Finalist | SF | Semifinalist | QF | Quarterfinalist | #R; RR; L# | Lost in # round Round-robin; Last # stage | DQ | Disqualified |
| DNQ | Did not qualify | DNP | Did not participate | WD | Withdrew | NH | Tournament not held | #R; RR; L# | Lost in # round Round-robin; Last # stage | NYF | Not yet founded |
