= 2020 PDC World Youth Championship =

2020 PDC Unicorn World Youth Championship

Tournament information
- Dates: 28 September 2020; 29 November 2020 (final)
- Venue: Metrodome, Barnsley (early rounds); Ricoh Arena, Coventry (final)
- Country: England
- Organisation(s): PDC
- Format: Legs; First to 5 (group stage); First to 6 (knockout phase)
- Prize fund: £60,000
- Winner's share: £10,000
- High checkout: 170 Gian van Veen (Last 32)

Champion(s)
- (England) Bradley Brooks

The 2020 PDC Unicorn World Youth Championship was the tenth edition of the PDC World Youth Championship, a tournament organised by the Professional Darts Corporation for darts players aged between 16 and 23.

The group stage and knock-out phase from the last 32 to the semi-finals were played at Metrodome, Barnsley, on 28 September 2020. The final took place on 29 November 2020 at the Ricoh Arena, Coventry, before the final of the 2020 Players Championship Finals.

England's Luke Humphries was the reigning champion after defeating Adam Gawlas of the Czech Republic 6–0 in the 2019 final, but he was unable to defend his title, as he was over the age limit.

England's Bradley Brooks won the title after defeating compatriot Joe Davis 6–5 in the final.

== Prize money ==
Position (no. of players)		Prize money (Total: £60,000)
Winner	(1)	£10,000
Runner-up	(1)	£5,000
Semi-finalists	(2)	£2,500
Quarter-finalists	(4)	£1,600
Last 16	(8)	£1,000
Last 32	(16)	£500
Second in group	(32)	£300
Third in group	(32)	£250

== Qualifiers ==
The field of 96 players is made of PDC Tour Card Holders, Development Tour players and International Qualifiers. All entrants ranked on the PDC Order of Merit were seeded first, with the top players on the Development Tour Order of Merit following up to 32 seeds. The numbers of International Qualifiers were significantly reduced due to the disruption caused by the COVID-19 pandemic.

PDC Order of Merit Qualifiers:

1. (Netherlands) Jeffrey de Zwaan
2. (Germany) Martin Schindler
3. (England) Harry Ward
4. (England) Ted Evetts
5. (Netherlands) Geert Nentjes
6. (Netherlands) Niels Zonneveld
7. (Scotland) William Borland
8. (England) Callan Rydz
9. (England) Ryan Meikle
10. (England) Bradley Brooks
11. (Netherlands) Jitse van der Wal
12. (Wales) Lewy Williams
13. (Belgium) Brian Raman
14. (Northern Ireland) Nathan Rafferty
15. (England) Dom Taylor
16. (Netherlands) Kevin Doets
17. (Netherlands) Maikel Verberk

Development Tour Qualifiers:

18. (Republic of Ireland) Keane Barry
19. (Netherlands) Berry van Peer
20. (Netherlands) Damian Mol
21. (England) Joe Davis
22. (England) Keelan Kay
23. (Wales) Rhys Griffin
24. (Poland) Sebastian Białecki
25. (Hong Kong) Lee Lok Yin
26. (Netherlands) Owen Roelofs
27. (Czech Republic) Adam Gawlas
28. (England) Jaikob Selby-Rivas
29. (England) Lewis Pride
30. (Austria) Rusty-Jake Rodriguez
31. (England) Jack Main
32. (Netherlands) Gian van Veen
33. (England) Thomas Lovely
34. (Wales) Liam Meek
35. (England) Joshua Richardson
36. (Netherlands) Daan Bastiaansen
37. (England) Jarred Cole
38. (Netherlands) Jamai van den Herik
39. (Germany) Kevin Troppmann
40. (Netherlands) Danny van Trijp
41. (Netherlands) Henk Snijder
42. (England) Reece Colley
43. (Italy) Marcus Tommaso Brambati
44. (England) John Brown
45. (Scotland) Nathan Girvan
46. (England) Kalem Marsh
47. (Wales) Mikey Rees
48. (Wales) Justin Smith
49. (Scotland) Keith O'Neill
50. (England) Cameron Doyle
51. (England) Henry Cutting
52. (England) Lewis Gurney
53. (Germany) Ole Holtkamp
54. (Netherlands) Moreno Blom
55. (Germany) Sven Hesse
56. (Wales) Luke Colwill
57. (Netherlands) Levy Frauenfelder
58. (England) Ben Cheeseman
59. (England) Josh McCarthy
60. (Germany) Robin Beger
61. (Netherlands) Bertus Herks
62. (England) William Blackwell
63. (England) Charlie Symons
64. (England) James Beeton
65. (England) Brad Phillips
66. (England) Bradley Halls
67. (England) Owen Maiden
68. (England) George Killington
69. (Czech Republic) Roman Benecký
70. (England) Ben McCaffery
71. (England) Jack Kirtland
72. (Netherlands) Maartendirk Woord
73. (Netherlands) Brent Plaisier
74. (England) Adam Paxton
75. (Netherlands) Sam Coenders
76. (England) Aaron Ayres
77. (England) Callum Wildridge
78. (England) Daniel Perry
79. (Netherlands) Timo van den Elshout
80. (England) Michael Poole
81. (Germany) Egor Tvorogov
82. (Czech Republic) Vilem Sedivy
83. (England) Fred Box
84. (England) Jack Male
85. (Netherlands) Jurjen van der Velde
86. (Wales) Alec Small
87. (England) Ryan Payne
88. (England) Scott Hope
89. (Wales) Joshua Lloyd
90. (England) Thomas Cromwell
91. (England) Connor Pickett
92. (England) Henry Reddin
93. (Gibraltar) Justin Hewitt

International qualifiers:

- (Gibraltar) Sean Negrette
- (England) Nathan Potter
- (Hong Kong) Man Lok Leung

== Draw ==
=== Group stage ===
==== Group 1 ====
Pos.	Player	P	W	L	LF	LA	+/−	Pts	Status
1	(Netherlands) Jeffrey de Zwaan (1)	2	2	0	10	3	+7	4	Q
2	(Netherlands) Daan Bastiaansen	2	1	1	7	8	–1	2	Eliminated
3	(England) Cameron Doyle	2	0	2	4	10	–6	0	Eliminated

73.7 Daan Bastiaansen (Netherlands)	5 – 3	(England) Cameron Doyle 74.9
90.8 Jeffrey de Zwaan (Netherlands)	5 – 1	(England) Cameron Doyle 66.2
91.1 Jeffrey de Zwaan (Netherlands)	5 – 2	(Netherlands) Daan Bastiaansen 80.8

==== Group 2 ====
Pos.	Player	P	W	L	LF	LA	+/−	Pts	Status
1	(Netherlands) Gian van Veen (32)	2	1	1	9	7	+2	2	Q
2	(England) Charlie Symons	2	1	1	9	9	0	2	Eliminated
3	(England) Scott Hope	2	1	1	7	9	–2	2	Eliminated

72.0 Charlie Symons (England)	4 – 5	(England) Scott Hope 72.9
77.5 Gian van Veen (Netherlands)	4 – 5	(England) Charlie Symons 83.1
78.0 Gian van Veen (Netherlands)	5 – 2	(England) Scott Hope 78.5

==== Group 3 ====
Pos.	Player	P	W	L	LF	LA	+/−	Pts	Status
1	(England) Joshua Richardson	2	2	0	10	6	+4	4	Q
2	(Netherlands) Kevin Doets (16)	2	1	1	9	5	+4	2	Eliminated
3	(Germany) Sven Hesse	2	0	2	2	10	–8	0	Eliminated

75.7 Joshua Richardson (England)	5 – 2	(Germany) Sven Hesse 69.4
87.4 Kevin Doets (Netherlands)	5 – 0	(Germany) Sven Hesse 70.7
84.6 Kevin Doets (Netherlands)	4 – 5	(England) Joshua Richardson 78.9

==== Group 4 ====
Pos.	Player	P	W	L	LF	LA	+/−	Pts	Status
1	(Netherlands) Moreno Blom	2	2	0	10	6	+4	4	Q
2	(Netherlands) Maikel Verberk (17)	2	1	1	9	8	+1	2	Eliminated
3	(Netherlands) Levy Frauenfelder	2	0	2	5	10	–5	0	Eliminated

88.8 Moreno Blom (Netherlands)	5 – 2	(Netherlands) Levy Frauenfelder 86.1
85.9 Maikel Verberk (Netherlands)	5 – 3	(Netherlands) Levy Frauenfelder 80.0
94.1 Maikel Verberk (Netherlands)	4 – 5	(Netherlands) Moreno Blom 92.4

==== Group 5 ====
Pos.	Player	P	W	L	LF	LA	+/−	Pts	Status
1	(England) Callan Rydz (8)	2	2	0	10	6	+4	4	Q
2	(Germany) Ole Holtkamp	2	1	1	7	7	0	2	Eliminated
3	(Netherlands) Bertus Herks	2	0	2	6	10	–4	0	Eliminated

85.0 Ole Holtkamp (Germany)	5 – 2	(Netherlands) Bertus Herks 81.1
83.7 Callan Rydz (England)	5 – 4	(Netherlands) Bertus Herks 79.6
91.5 Callan Rydz (England)	5 – 2	(Germany) Ole Holtkamp 83.4

==== Group 6 ====
Pos.	Player	P	W	L	LF	LA	+/−	Pts	Status
1	(Hong Kong) Lee Lok Yin (25)	2	2	0	10	3	+7	4	Q
2	(England) Callum Wildridge	2	1	1	5	8	–3	2	Eliminated
3	(Netherlands) Henk Snijder	2	0	2	6	10	–4	0	Eliminated

76.8 Henk Snijder (Netherlands)	3 – 5	(England) Callum Wildridge 74.7
82.9 Lee Lok Yin (Hong Kong)	5 – 3	(Netherlands) Henk Snijder 77.3
86.4 Lee Lok Yin (Hong Kong)	5 – 0	(England) Callum Wildridge 74.9

==== Group 7 ====
Pos.	Player	P	W	L	LF	LA	+/−	Pts	Status
1	(England) Ryan Meikle (9)	2	2	0	10	1	+9	4	Q
2	(Netherlands) Timo van den Elshout	2	1	1	5	9	–4	2	Eliminated
3	(Gibraltar) Sean Negrette	2	0	2	5	10	–5	0	Eliminated

76.9 Timo van den Elshout (Netherlands)	5 – 4	(Gibraltar) Sean Negrette 74.2
85.3 Ryan Meikle (England)	5 – 1	(Gibraltar) Sean Negrette 76.3
87.4 Ryan Meikle (England)	5 – 0	(Netherlands) Timo van den Elshout 81.2

==== Group 8 ====
Pos.	Player	P	W	L	LF	LA	+/−	Pts	Status
1	(Poland) Sebastian Białecki (24)	2	2	0	10	3	+7	4	Q
2	(Wales) Mikey Rees	2	1	1	6	8	–2	2	Eliminated
3	(England) Thomas Lovely	2	0	2	5	10	–5	0	Eliminated

84.6 Thomas Lovely (England)	3 – 5	(Wales) Mikey Rees 88.6
90.6 Sebastian Białecki (Poland)	5 – 2	(England) Thomas Lovely 77.3
79.7 Sebastian Białecki (Poland)	5 – 1	(Wales) Mikey Rees 76.8

==== Group 9 ====
Pos.	Player	P	W	L	LF	LA	+/−	Pts	Status
1	(England) Ted Evetts (4)	2	2	0	10	1	+9	4	Q
2	(Netherlands) Jurjen van der Velde	2	1	1	6	7	–1	2	Eliminated
3	(Czech Republic) Vilem Sedivy	2	0	2	2	10	–8	0	Eliminated

76.8 Vilem Sedivy (Czech Republic)	2 – 5	(Netherlands) Jurjen van der Velde 74.8
78.3 Ted Evetts (England)	5 – 0	(Czech Republic) Vilem Sedivy 69.9
83.2 Ted Evetts (England)	5 – 1	(Netherlands) Jurjen van der Velde 78.0

==== Group 10 ====
Pos.	Player	P	W	L	LF	LA	+/−	Pts	Status
1	(England) Lewis Pride (29)	2	1	1	9	8	+1	2	Q
2	(England) William Blackwell	2	1	1	8	8	0	2	Eliminated
3	(England) Kalem Marsh	2	1	1	8	9	–1	2	Eliminated

70.3 Kalem Marsh (England)	3 – 5	(England) William Blackwell 75.5
79.0 Lewis Pride (England)	4 – 5	(England) Kalem Marsh 71.7
72.5 Lewis Pride (England)	5 – 3	(England) William Blackwell 69.9

==== Group 11 ====
Pos.	Player	P	W	L	LF	LA	+/−	Pts	Status
1	(Belgium) Brian Raman (13)	2	2	0	10	7	+3	4	Q
2	(England) Nathan Potter	2	1	1	9	9	0	2	Eliminated
3	(Netherlands) Maartendirk Woord	2	0	2	7	10	–3	0	Eliminated

75.9 Maartendirk Woord (Netherlands)	4 – 5	(England) Nathan Potter 82.9
87.4 Brian Raman (Belgium)	5 – 3	(Netherlands) Maartendirk Woord 80.5
76.2 Brian Raman (Belgium)	5 – 4	(England) Nathan Potter 75.8

==== Group 12 ====
Pos.	Player	P	W	L	LF	LA	+/−	Pts	Status
1	(Germany) Kevin Troppmann	2	2	0	10	3	+7	4	Q
2	(Netherlands) Damian Mol (20)	2	1	1	6	5	+1	2	Eliminated
3	(Wales) Joshua Lloyd	2	0	2	2	10	–8	0	Eliminated

77.0 Kevin Troppmann (Germany)	5 – 2	(Wales) Joshua Lloyd 73.5
76.7 Damian Mol (Netherlands)	5 – 0	(Wales) Joshua Lloyd 64.8
79.2 Damian Mol (Netherlands)	1 – 5	(Germany) Kevin Troppmann 93.3

==== Group 13 ====
Pos.	Player	P	W	L	LF	LA	+/−	Pts	Status
1	(Hong Kong) Man Lok Leung	2	2	0	10	4	+6	4	Q
2	(Netherlands) Geert Nentjes (5)	2	1	1	8	8	0	2	Eliminated
3	(Italy) Marcus Tommaso Brambati	2	0	2	4	10	–6	0	Eliminated

65.7 Marcus Tommaso Brambati (Italy)	1 – 5	(Hong Kong) Man Lok Leung 80.3
83.3 Geert Nentjes (Netherlands)	5 – 3	(Italy) Marcus Tommaso Brambati 72.8
82.3 Geert Nentjes (Netherlands)	3 – 5	(Hong Kong) Man Lok Leung 83.5

==== Group 14 ====
Pos.	Player	P	W	L	LF	LA	+/−	Pts	Status
1	(England) Jaikob Selby-Rivas (28)	2	2	0	10	4	+6	4	Q
2	(England) Ben Cheeseman	2	1	1	6	8	–2	2	Eliminated
3	(England) Josh McCarthy	2	0	2	6	10	–4	0	Eliminated

86.2 Ben Cheeseman (England)	5 – 3	(England) Josh McCarthy 79.7
85.8 Jaikob Selby-Rivas (England)	5 – 3	(England) Josh McCarthy 71.5
86.6 Jaikob Selby-Rivas (England)	5 – 1	(England) Ben Cheeseman 70.9

==== Group 15 ====
Pos.	Player	P	W	L	LF	LA	+/−	Pts	Status
1	(England) Jack Male	2	2	0	10	6	+4	4	Q
2	(Wales) Lewy Williams (12)	2	1	1	9	6	+3	2	Eliminated
3	(England) Michael Poole	2	0	2	3	10	–7	0	Eliminated

70.5 Michael Poole (England)	2 – 5	(England) Jack Male 74.4
86.0 Lewy Williams (Wales)	5 – 1	(England) Michael Poole 77.3
85.8 Lewy Williams (Wales)	4 – 5	(England) Jack Male 81.8

==== Group 16 ====
Pos.	Player	P	W	L	LF	LA	+/−	Pts	Status
1	(England) Joe Davis (21)	2	2	0	10	4	+6	4	Q
2	(Scotland) Keith O'Neill	2	1	1	7	8	–1	2	Eliminated
3	(Czech Republic) Roman Benecký	2	0	2	5	10	–5	0	Eliminated

75.4 Keith O'Neill (Scotland)	5 – 3	(Czech Republic) Roman Benecký 77.5
90.4 Joe Davis (England)	5 – 2	(Czech Republic) Roman Benecký 79.5
85.0 Joe Davis (England)	5 – 2	(Scotland) Keith O'Neill 79.5

==== Group 17 ====
Pos.	Player	P	W	L	LF	LA	+/−	Pts	Status
1	(Germany) Martin Schindler (2)	2	2	0	10	3	+7	4	Q
2	(England) Owen Maiden	2	1	1	6	7	–1	2	Eliminated
3	(Netherlands) Brent Plaisier	2	0	2	4	10	–6	0	Eliminated

72.9 Owen Maiden (England)	5 – 2	(Netherlands) Brent Plaisier 70.6
80.5 Martin Schindler (Germany)	5 – 2	(Netherlands) Brent Plaisier 73.1
95.3 Martin Schindler (Germany)	5 – 1	(England) Owen Maiden 75.8

==== Group 18 ====
Pos.	Player	P	W	L	LF	LA	+/−	Pts	Status
1	(England) Jack Main (31)	2	2	0	10	4	+6	4	Q
2	(Wales) Alec Small	2	1	1	6	7	–1	2	Eliminated
3	(Netherlands) Jamai van den Herik	2	0	2	5	10	–5	0	Eliminated

77.2 Jamai van den Herik (Netherlands)	2 – 5	(Wales) Alec Small 83.8
74.9 Jack Main (England)	5 – 3	(Netherlands) Jamai van den Herik 68.0
69.1 Jack Main (England)	5 – 1	(Wales) Alec Small 67.5

==== Group 19 ====
Pos.	Player	P	W	L	LF	LA	+/−	Pts	Status
1	(England) Dom Taylor (15)	2	1	1	6	5	+1	2	Q
2	(England) Daniel Perry	2	1	1	5	5	0	2	Eliminated
3	(England) Lewis Gurney	2	1	1	5	6	–1	2	Eliminated

85.9 Lewis Gurney (England)	0 – 5	(England) Daniel Perry 93.9
71.8 Dom Taylor (England)	1 – 5	(England) Lewis Gurney 76.7
89.5 Dom Taylor (England)	5 – 0	(England) Daniel Perry 78.6

==== Group 20 ====
Pos.	Player	P	W	L	LF	LA	+/−	Pts	Status
1	(Republic of Ireland) Keane Barry (18)	2	2	0	10	2	+8	4	Q
2	(England) John Brown	2	1	1	5	9	–4	2	Eliminated
3	(England) Thomas Cromwell	2	0	2	6	10	–4	0	Eliminated

79.1 John Brown (England)	5 – 4	(England) Thomas Cromwell 72.7
91.9 Keane Barry (Republic of Ireland)	5 – 2	(England) Thomas Cromwell 79.2
93.9 Keane Barry (Republic of Ireland)	5 – 0	(England) John Brown 77.8

==== Group 21 ====
Pos.	Player	P	W	L	LF	LA	+/−	Pts	Status
1	(Scotland) William Borland (7)	2	2	0	10	1	+9	4	Q
2	(England) James Beeton	2	1	1	6	6	0	2	Eliminated
3	(England) Jack Kirtland	2	0	2	1	10	–9	0	Eliminated

82.4 James Beeton (England)	5 – 1	(England) Jack Kirtland 77.8
88.4 William Borland (Scotland)	5 – 0	(England) Jack Kirtland 63.9
84.8 William Borland (Scotland)	5 – 1	(England) James Beeton 80.5

==== Group 22 ====
Pos.	Player	P	W	L	LF	LA	+/−	Pts	Status
1	(England) Fred Box	2	2	0	10	3	+7	4	Q
2	(Netherlands) Owen Roelofs (26)	2	1	1	8	6	+2	2	Eliminated
3	(England) Brad Phillips	2	0	2	1	10	–9	0	Eliminated

68.6 Brad Phillips (England)	0 – 5	(England) Fred Box 85.4
83.0 Owen Roelofs (Netherlands)	5 – 1	(England) Brad Phillips 71.5
78.1 Owen Roelofs (Netherlands)	3 – 5	(England) Fred Box 81.9

==== Group 23 ====
Pos.	Player	P	W	L	LF	LA	+/−	Pts	Status
1	(England) Bradley Brooks (10)	2	2	0	10	1	+9	4	Q
2	(England) Henry Cutting	2	1	1	6	6	0	2	Eliminated
3	(Netherlands) Sam Coenders	2	0	2	1	10	–9	0	Eliminated

77.7 Henry Cutting (England)	5 – 1	(Netherlands) Sam Coenders 66.9
87.4 Bradley Brooks (England)	5 – 0	(Netherlands) Sam Coenders 70.3
89.1 Bradley Brooks (England)	5 – 1	(England) Henry Cutting 86.4

==== Group 24 ====
Pos.	Player	P	W	L	LF	LA	+/−	Pts	Status
1	(Wales) Rhys Griffin (23)	2	1	1	8	5	+3	2	Q
2	(Netherlands) Danny van Trijp	2	1	1	9	8	+1	2	Eliminated
3	(Wales) Justin Smith	2	1	1	5	9	–4	2	Eliminated

88.0 Danny van Trijp (Netherlands)	4 – 5	(Wales) Justin Smith 90.4
87.1 Rhys Griffin (Wales)	3 – 5	(Netherlands) Danny van Trijp 87.8
85.4 Rhys Griffin (Wales)	5 – 0	(Wales) Justin Smith 80.0

==== Group 25 ====
Pos.	Player	P	W	L	LF	LA	+/−	Pts	Status
1	(England) Jarred Cole	2	2	0	10	4	+6	4	Q
2	(England) Harry Ward (3)	2	1	1	7	7	0	2	Eliminated
3	(England) Adam Paxton	2	0	2	4	10	–6	0	Eliminated

88.8 Jarred Cole (England)	5 – 2	(England) Adam Paxton 77.0
98.2 Harry Ward (England)	5 – 2	(England) Adam Paxton 82.3
79.6 Harry Ward (England)	2 – 5	(England) Jarred Cole 83.2

==== Group 26 ====
Pos.	Player	P	W	L	LF	LA	+/−	Pts	Status
1	(Austria) Rusty-Jake Rodriguez (30)	2	2	0	10	3	+7	4	Q
2	(England) Connor Pickett	2	1	1	7	6	+1	2	Eliminated
3	(Germany) Egor Tvorogov	2	0	2	2	10	–8	0	Eliminated

74.7 Egor Tvorogov (Germany)	1 – 5	(England) Connor Pickett 74.6
89.6 Rusty-Jake Rodriguez (Austria)	5 – 1	(Germany) Egor Tvorogov 79.4
82.3 Rusty-Jake Rodriguez (Austria)	5 – 2	(England) Connor Pickett 75.9

==== Group 27 ====
Pos.	Player	P	W	L	LF	LA	+/−	Pts	Status
1	(Northern Ireland) Nathan Rafferty (14)	2	2	0	10	4	+6	4	Q
2	(England) Reece Colley	2	1	1	8	8	0	2	Eliminated
3	(Germany) Robin Beger	2	0	2	4	10	–6	0	Eliminated

77.8 Reece Colley (England)	5 – 3	(Germany) Robin Beger 81.1
80.4 Nathan Rafferty (Northern Ireland)	5 – 1	(Germany) Robin Beger 74.7
84.6 Nathan Rafferty (Northern Ireland)	5 – 3	(England) Reece Colley 87.6

==== Group 28 ====
Pos.	Player	P	W	L	LF	LA	+/−	Pts	Status
1	(England) Bradley Halls	2	2	0	10	3	+7	4	Q
2	(Netherlands) Berry van Peer (19)	2	1	1	6	5	+1	2	Eliminated
3	(Gibraltar) Justin Hewitt	2	0	2	2	10	–8	0	Eliminated

75.1 Bradley Halls (England)	5 – 2	(Gibraltar) Justin Hewitt 72.0
81.7 Berry van Peer (Netherlands)	5 – 0	(Gibraltar) Justin Hewitt 71.7
78.6 Berry van Peer (Netherlands)	1 – 5	(England) Bradley Halls 82.2

==== Group 29 ====
Pos.	Player	P	W	L	LF	LA	+/−	Pts	Status
1	(Netherlands) Niels Zonneveld (6)	2	2	0	10	1	+9	4	Q
2	(Wales) Luke Colwill	2	1	1	6	9	–3	2	Eliminated
3	(England) Aaron Ayres	2	0	2	4	10	–6	0	Eliminated

77.9 Luke Colwill (Wales)	5 – 4	(England) Aaron Ayres 75.4
93.9 Niels Zonneveld (Netherlands)	5 – 0	(England) Aaron Ayres 66.0
81.0 Niels Zonneveld (Netherlands)	5 – 1	(Wales) Luke Colwill 72.7

==== Group 30 ====
Pos.	Player	P	W	L	LF	LA	+/−	Pts	Status
1	(Czech Republic) Adam Gawlas (27)	2	2	0	10	4	+6	4	Q
2	(England) Ryan Payne	2	1	1	7	9	–2	2	Eliminated
3	(England) Ben McCaffery	0	0	2	6	10	–4	0	Eliminated

75.2 Ben McCaffery (England)	4 – 5	(England) Ryan Payne 80.6
85.8 Adam Gawlas (Czech Republic)	5 – 2	(England) Ben McCaffery 77.7
81.0 Adam Gawlas (Czech Republic)	5 – 2	(England) Ryan Payne 77.1

==== Group 31 ====
Pos.	Player	P	W	L	LF	LA	+/−	Pts	Status
1	(Wales) Liam Meek	2	2	0	10	5	+5	4	Q
2	(Netherlands) Jitse van der Wal (11)	2	1	1	7	8	–1	2	Eliminated
3	(Scotland) Nathan Girvan	2	0	2	6	10	–4	0	Eliminated

83.0 Liam Meek (Wales)	5 – 3	(Scotland) Nathan Girvan 84.8
78.7 Jitse van der Wal (Netherlands)	5 – 3	(Scotland) Nathan Girvan 77.9
72.7 Jitse van der Wal (Netherlands)	2 – 5	(Wales) Liam Meek 79.2

==== Group 32 ====
Pos.	Player	P	W	L	LF	LA	+/−	Pts	Status
1	(England) George Killington	2	2	0	10	1	+9	4	Q
2	(England) Keelan Kay (22)	2	1	1	5	7	–2	2	Eliminated
3	(England) Henry Reddin	2	0	2	3	10	–7		Eliminated

76.7 George Killington (England)	5 – 1	(England) Henry Reddin 74.1
79.2 Keelan Kay (England)	5 – 2	(England) Henry Reddin 69.5
82.4 Keelan Kay (England)	0 – 5	(England) George Killington 95.1

=== Knockout Phase ===
Last 32 (best of 11 legs); 28 September
1	(Netherlands) Jeffrey de Zwaan 87.7	6
32	(Netherlands) Gian van Veen 74.7	3
(England) Joshua Richardson 78.7	3
(Netherlands) Moreno Blom 82.1	6
8	(England) Callan Rydz 86.1	6
25	(Hong Kong) Lee Lok Yin 85.6	3
9	(England) Ryan Meikle 91.1	6
24	(Poland) Sebastian Białecki 80.1	0
4	(England) Ted Evetts 76.7	5
29	(England) Lewis Pride 77.4	6
13	(Belgium) Brian Raman 87.3	6
(Germany) Kevin Troppmann 81.2	2
(Hong Kong) Man Lok Leung 86.8	5
28	(England) Jaikob Selby-Rivas 80.3	6
(England) Jack Male 84.2	3
21	(England) Joe Davis 85.5	6
2	(Germany) Martin Schindler 87.7	6
31	(England) Jack Main 89.3	3
15	(England) Dom Taylor 80.9	3
18	(Republic of Ireland) Keane Barry 90.9	6
7	(Scotland) William Borland 101.2	6
(England) Fred Box 90.0	4
10	(England) Bradley Brooks 87.3	6
23	(Wales) Rhys Griffin 77.7	2
(England) Jarred Cole 91.2	6
30	(Austria) Rusty-Jake Rodriguez 90.0	5
14	(Northern Ireland) Nathan Rafferty 86.0	6
(England) Bradley Halls 79.9	3
6	(Netherlands) Niels Zonneveld 92.0	6
27	(Czech Republic) Adam Gawlas 93.3	1
(Wales) Liam Meek 81.1	3
(England) George Killington 87.9	6

Last 16 (best of 11 legs); 28 September
1	(Netherlands) Jeffrey de Zwaan 90.2	6
(Netherlands) Moreno Blom 79.6	5
8	(England) Callan Rydz 95.3	5
9	(England) Ryan Meikle 98.9	6
29	(England) Lewis Pride 88.3	4
13	(Belgium) Brian Raman 96.3	6
28	(England) Jaikob Selby-Rivas 81.7	2
21	(England) Joe Davis 86.1	6
2	(Germany) Martin Schindler 93.7	6
18	(Republic of Ireland) Keane Barry 95.1	5
7	(Scotland) William Borland 93.2	4
10	(England) Bradley Brooks 94.0	6
(England) Jarred Cole 84.6	2
14	(Northern Ireland) Nathan Rafferty 93.6	6
6	(Netherlands) Niels Zonneveld 90.2	6
(England) George Killington 89.0	5

Quarter-finals (best of 11 legs); 28 September
1	(Netherlands) Jeffrey de Zwaan 91.8	6
9	(England) Ryan Meikle 98.1	5
13	(Belgium) Brian Raman 88.7	4
21	(England) Joe Davis 92.3	6
2	(Germany) Martin Schindler 91.0	5
10	(England) Bradley Brooks 84.4	6
14	(Northern Ireland) Nathan Rafferty 77.1	2
6	(Netherlands) Niels Zonneveld 81.7	6

Semi-finals (best of 11 legs); 28 September
1	(Netherlands) Jeffrey de Zwaan 81.3	5
21	(England) Joe Davis 87.4	6
10	(England) Bradley Brooks 93.7	6
6	(Netherlands) Niels Zonneveld 86.9	1

Final (best of 11 legs); 29 November
21	(England) Joe Davis 78.16	5
10	(England) Bradley Brooks 81.63	6
