= Fabian Schmutzler =

German darts player (born 2005)

Personal information
- Full name: Fabian Schmutzler
- Nickname: "The Fabulous Fab"
- Born: 19 October 2005 (age 21) Frankfurt am Main, Hessen, Germany

Sport
- Sport: Darts
- Playing since: 2019
- Darts: 24g One80
- Laterality: Right-handed
- Walk-on music: "Turn It Up" by Armin van Buuren

Organisation (see split in darts)
- PDC: 2021–

PDC premier events – best performances
- World Championship: Last 96: 2022
- UK Open: Last 96: 2022

Other tournament wins
- Years
PDC Development Tour	2021 (x2)

Fabian Schmutzler (born 19 October 2005) is a German professional darts player who competes in Professional Darts Corporation (PDC) events. He was the second-youngest player ever to compete in the PDC World Darts Championship. He won two titles on the PDC Development Tour in 2021.

== Career ==
In December 2018, Schmutzler got an electronic dartboard from his mother as a holiday gift. In February 2019, he really started playing darts and won his first national youth's tournament very quickly. Schmutzler plays in the DDV Bundesliga for the ESV Blaugold Flörsheim and is also part of the national team. After reaching the required age, Schmutzler gained his first experiences at the Professional Darts Corporation in November 2021 at the PDC Development Tour tournaments in Niedernhausen.

Right at his very first event, he played his way into the finals and could only be stopped there by the Rusty-Jake Rodriguez, who defeated him by 3–5 in legs. On November, he won his first international tournament against Marcel Gerdon by 5–2 in legs. The next day, he repeated his success by defeating Adam Gawlas by 5–2 in legs. Since Rusty-Jake Rodriguez already qualified for the 2022 PDC World Darts Championship via 2022 PDC Pro Tour, as a second ranked player in the European Development Tour Order of Merit, at just 16 years old he qualified for his first World Darts Championship.

At the 2021 PDC World Youth Championship at the end of November, Schmutzler did not survive the group stage, where he lost his decisive game against Keelan Kay. In December, Schmutzler made his PDC World Darts Championship debut against Ryan Meikle, but failed to win a set and lost. After attending PDC Q-School for the first time, Schmutzler made his European Tour debut at the 2022 International Darts Open, where he lost to Daryl Gurney by 2–6 in legs. Schmutzler was also at the 2022 UK Open for the first time. There he started this tournament with a 6–5 win against Kai Fan Leung and thus celebrated his first victory on television stage. He also edged Steve Clayson by 6–2 in legs. In the third round he lost to Adrian Lewis by 0–6 in legs.

== World Championship results ==
=== PDC ===
- 2022: First round (lost to Ryan Meikle 0–3) (sets)

== Performance timeline ==
Tournament	2021	2022
PDC Ranked televised events
World Championship	DNQ	1R
UK Open	DNQ	3R
PDC Non-ranked televised events
World Youth Championship	RR	RR
Career statistics
Season-end ranking (PDC)	–	182
