= Zevenhuizen, Westerkwartier =

Zevenhuizen Zeuvenhuzen (Gronings)
- Village
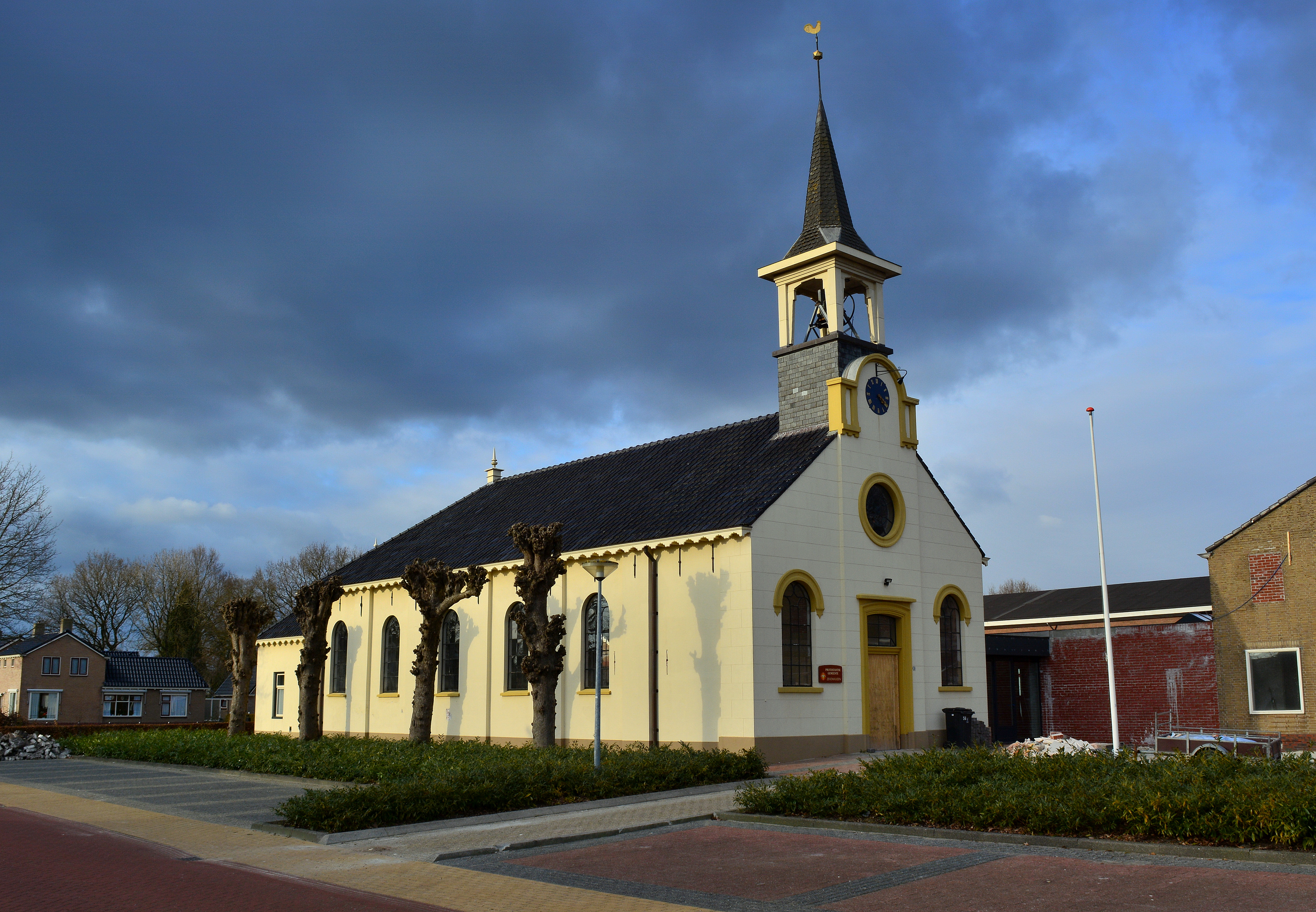
- Church of Zevenhuizen

- Flag Coat of arms

- Location in the province of Groningen in the Netherlands Zevenhuizen (Netherlands)
- Coordinates: 53°8′N 6°21′E
- Country: Netherlands
- Province: Groningen
- Municipality: Westerkwartier
- Elevation: 4.5 m (15 ft)

Population (2021)
  - Total: 2,725
- Time zone: UTC+1 (CET)
  - Summer (DST): UTC+2 (CEST)
- Postcode: 9354
- Area code: 0594
- Website: 7huizen.nl

Zevenhuizen (Dutch: [ˈzeːvə(n)ˌɦœyzə(n)]; Gronings: Zeuvenhuzen, Zeuv'nhoezen or Seubnhuuzen) is a village in the municipality of Westerkwartier in the province of Groningen in the Netherlands. As of 2021, it had a population of 2,725.

== History ==
Zevenhuizen is a relatively young village. For centuries there was no village, only a wild raised bog. Initially, this peat was excavated and reclaimed on a small scale by the farmers as an extension of the estates of Vredewold (with Tolbert as its main town).

After the establishment of the Van Ewsums at Nienoord, peat extraction was tackled on a large scale. The pattern of a peat colony is clearly recognizable in the numerous canals of Zevenhuizen. Along these canals were dirt roads, which have since been asphalted. A large peat fire, as a result of buckwheat fires on 11 June 1833, destroyed a vital part of the peat between De Wilp and Leek and with it a large part of the village of Zevenhuizen. The fire killed four people, burned more than 60 houses, and destroyed 1,167,000 tons of peat.

Zevenhuizen became a church village in 1835; the Reformed church of Zevenhuizen was built in that year, the spire was erected three years later and the clock was taken over from the Frisian municipality of Oudeschoot. However, the church was so badly built that a new church had to be built on the same spot in 1869, the current church. In 1844 the seceding Reformed founded their own church on the Evertswijk. Around 1850 there were already 430 houses and 2,600 inhabitants. In 1893, the village was released from its isolation by the construction of the paved road Leek-Zevenhuizen.

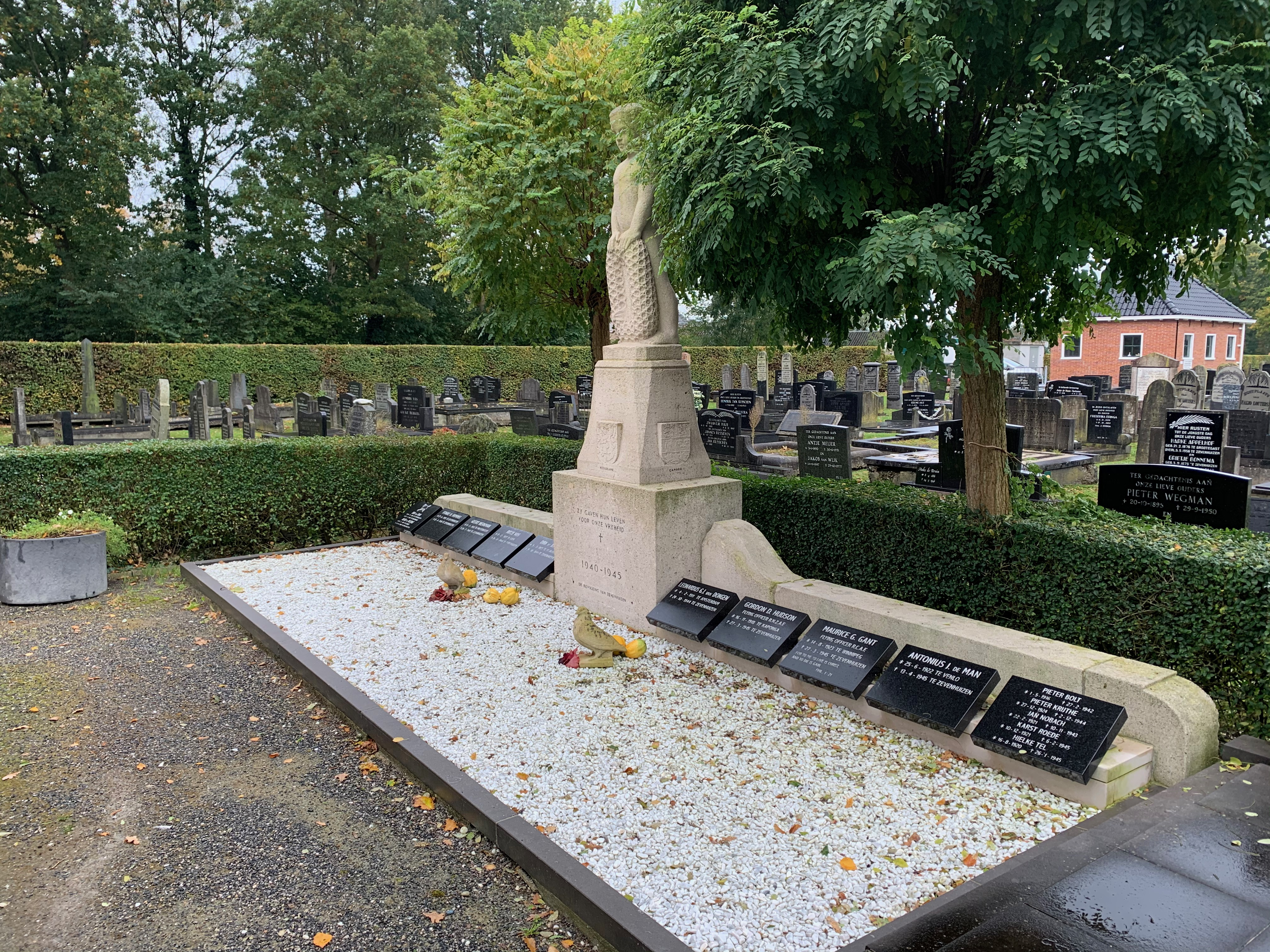
The memorial for all fallen victims during World War II occupation

After the Second World War, a memorial dedicated to all fallen victims during the German occupation was erected at the cemetery on the Kerkhoflaan.

In 1920-21 the Reformed church was renovated and in 1957 a new Reformed church was built in the village with a somewhat unusual white roof ridge. The old building at Evertswijk 23 was taken into use by a contractor and later demolished. The new Reformed church was also demolished in 2020.

Zevenhuizen initially belonged to the municipality of Leek, but during a municipal reorganization in 2019, Leek was absorbed into the merged municipality of Westerkwartier.

== Notable people ==
- Kim Polling (1999), judoka

== Bibliography ==
- Flonk, Albert; Kuiper, Gerrit; Russchen, Jannes (2004). Historie van en over Zeu'mhusen. Zevenhuizen.
