= 2023 PDC Players Championship series =

2023 Darts tournament series

The 2023 PDC Players Championship series consisted of 30 darts tournaments on the 2023 PDC Pro Tour.

The Top 64 on the Players Championship Order of Merit qualified for the 2023 Players Championship Finals.

== Prize money ==
The prize money for the Players Championship events remained at 2022 levels, with each event having a prize fund of £100,000.

This is how the prize money was divided:

Stage (no. of players)		Prize money (Total: £100,000)
Winner	(1)	£12,000
Runner-up	(1)	£8,000
Semi-finalists	(2)	£4,000
Quarter-finalists	(4)	£3,000
Fourth round	(8)	£2,000
Third round	(16)	£1,250
Second round	(32)	£750
First round	(64)	N/A

== February ==
=== Players Championship 1 ===
Players Championship 1 was contested on Saturday 11 February 2023 at the Barnsley Metrodome. The tournament was won by Ryan Searle, who defeated Jamie Hughes 8–4 in the final.

Quarter-finals (best of 11 legs)
17	Ryan Searle 93.95	6
8	Dirk van Duijvenbode 94.07	5
13	Jonny Clayton 101.91	6
5	Dave Chisnall 87.42	1
31	Callan Rydz 99.63	4
Jamie Hughes 90.04	6
Dylan Slevin 91.53	6
27	Daryl Gurney 86.78	5

Semi-finals (best of 13 legs)
17	Ryan Searle 95.39	7
13	Jonny Clayton 102.69	4
Jamie Hughes 89.33	7
Dylan Slevin 89.83	2

Final (best of 15 legs)
17	Ryan Searle 100.75	8
Jamie Hughes 93.07	4

=== Players Championship 2 ===
Players Championship 2 was contested on Sunday 12 February 2023 at the Barnsley Metrodome. The tournament was won by Danny Noppert, who defeated Simon Whitlock 8–3 in the final.

Quarter-finals (best of 11 legs)
1	Luke Humphries 101.96	6
24	James Wade 100.54	5
Richard Veenstra 95.31	5
Simon Whitlock 94.81	6
31	Brendan Dolan 97.27	6
7	Michael Smith 84.36	3
30	Callan Rydz 84.69	4
11	Danny Noppert 93.66	6

Semi-finals (best of 13 legs)
1	Luke Humphries 95.82	4
Simon Whitlock 100.30	7
31	Brendan Dolan 93.97	3
11	Danny Noppert 90.46	7

Final (best of 15 legs)
Simon Whitlock 89.53	3
11	Danny Noppert 100.70	8

=== Players Championship 3 ===
Players Championship 3 was contested on Saturday 18 February 2023 at the Barnsley Metrodome. The tournament was won by Kim Huybrechts, who defeated Gabriel Clemens 8–1 in the final.

Quarter-finals (best of 11 legs)
16	Andrew Gilding 97.94	5
8	Gerwyn Price 97.63	6
29	Kim Huybrechts 94.10	6
12	Josh Rock 95.49	5
18	Gabriel Clemens 84.73	6
23	Madars Razma 86.05	3
Matt Campbell 102.25	6
Gian van Veen 96.43	3

Semi-finals (best of 13 legs)
8	Gerwyn Price 97.34	3
29	Kim Huybrechts 95.22	7
18	Gabriel Clemens 92.98	7
Matt Campbell 91.19	4

Final (best of 15 legs)
29	Kim Huybrechts 92.60	8
18	Gabriel Clemens 85.89	1

=== Players Championship 4 ===
Players Championship 4 was contested on Sunday 19 February 2023 at the Barnsley Metrodome. The tournament was won by Dirk van Duijvenbode, who defeated Ryan Searle 8–2 in the final.

Quarter-finals (best of 11 legs)
Maik Kuivenhoven 97.27	5
9	Ryan Searle 105.73	6
Krzysztof Kciuk 94.77	0
5	Dave Chisnall 104.86	6
31	Jim Williams 99.17	3
10	Joe Cullen 108.84	6
19	Stephen Bunting 89.84	5
6	Dirk van Duijvenbode 89.79	6

Semi-finals (best of 13 legs)
9	Ryan Searle 96.48	7
5	Dave Chisnall 90.65	4
10	Joe Cullen 99.20	6
6	Dirk van Duijvenbode 100.72	7

Final (best of 15 legs)
9	Ryan Searle 88.66	2
6	Dirk van Duijvenbode 100.08	8

== March ==
=== Players Championship 5 ===
Players Championship 5 was contested on Saturday 11 March 2023 at the Barnsley Metrodome. The tournament was won by Ross Smith, who defeated Gary Anderson 8–6 in the final.

Quarter-finals (best of 11 legs)
Ross Smith 98.26	6
8	Nathan Aspinall 96.38	3
13	Martin Schindler 93.81	6
5	Dirk van Duijvenbode 94.38	4
Gary Anderson 100.63	6
Chris Landman 91.42	4
19	Gerwyn Price 100.03	6
Raymond van Barneveld 69.84	1

Semi-finals (best of 13 legs)
Ross Smith 97.21	7
13	Martin Schindler 91.26	6
Gary Anderson 96.12	7
19	Gerwyn Price 95.71	5

Final (best of 15 legs)
Ross Smith 93.69	8
Gary Anderson 92.12	6

=== Players Championship 6 ===
Players Championship 6 was contested on Sunday 12 March 2023 at the Barnsley Metrodome. The tournament was won by Dirk van Duijvenbode, who defeated Ryan Searle 8–4 in the final.

Quarter-finals (best of 11 legs)
1	Luke Humphries 98.40	6
25	Ross Smith 106.63	4
4	Michael van Gerwen 101.91	2
5	Dirk van Duijvenbode 102.38	6
2	Dave Chisnall 101.69	5
10	Ryan Searle 93.57	6
Mike De Decker 88.80	6
Gian van Veen 92.24	4

Semi-finals (best of 13 legs)
1	Luke Humphries 99.94	6
5	Dirk van Duijvenbode 105.36	7
10	Ryan Searle 107.14	7
Mike De Decker 94.93	4

Final (best of 15 legs)
5	Dirk van Duijvenbode 103.92	8
10	Ryan Searle 96.97	4

=== Players Championship 7 ===
Players Championship 7 was contested on Sunday 19 March 2023 at Halle 39 in Hildesheim. Brendan Dolan hit a nine-dart finish in his match against Richard Veenstra. The tournament was won by Michael van Gerwen, who defeated Josh Rock 8–4 in the final.

Quarter-finals (best of 11 legs)
17	Dimitri Van den Bergh 86.08	3
9	Josh Rock 94.55	6
20	Krzysztof Ratajski 102.58	6
Mickey Mansell 95.17	5
2	Dave Chisnall 104.22	4
Bradley Brooks 97.58	6
3	Dirk van Duijvenbode 98.87	4
6	Michael van Gerwen 104.95	6

Semi-finals (best of 13 legs)
9	Josh Rock 95.76	7
20	Krzysztof Ratajski 96.18	3
Bradley Brooks 92.23	5
6	Michael van Gerwen 96.05	7

Final (best of 15 legs)
9	Josh Rock 99.75	4
6	Michael van Gerwen 98.29	8

=== Players Championship 8 ===
Players Championship 8 was contested on Monday 20 March 2023 at Halle 39 in Hildesheim. William O'Connor hit a nine-dart finish in his match against Jimmy Hendriks. The tournament was won by Gary Anderson, who defeated Krzysztof Ratajski 8–5 in the final.

Quarter-finals (best of 11 legs)
Gary Anderson 96.10	6
Gian van Veen 91.25	2
13	Gerwyn Price 95.40	6
Luke Woodhouse 89.73	5
18	Krzysztof Ratajski 100.62	6
26	Brendan Dolan 102.34	5
19	Ross Smith 96.84	3
Ricardo Pietreczko 93.45	6

Semi-finals (best of 13 legs)
Gary Anderson 101.08	7
13	Gerwyn Price 88.79	3
18	Krzysztof Ratajski 109.74	7
Ricardo Pietreczko 102.87	2

Final (best of 15 legs)
Gary Anderson 99.77	8
18	Krzysztof Ratajski 93.31	5

== April ==
=== Players Championship 9 ===
Players Championship 9 was contested on Saturday 15 April 2023 at the Robin Park Tennis Centre in Wigan. The tournament was won by Krzysztof Ratajski, who defeated Chris Landman 8–1 in the final.

Quarter-finals (best of 11 legs)
Chris Landman 95.18	6
9	Martin Schindler 89.15	5
20	Brendan Dolan 95.20	6
21	James Wade 95.44	5
15	Krzysztof Ratajski 99.72	6
7	Josh Rock 97.05	4
Gary Anderson 98.61	1
11	Jonny Clayton 108.16	6

Semi-finals (best of 13 legs)
Chris Landman 88.67	7
20	Brendan Dolan 91.16	5
15	Krzysztof Ratajski 98.23	7
11	Jonny Clayton 94.53	6

Final (best of 15 legs)
Chris Landman 83.76	1
15	Krzysztof Ratajski 94.17	8

=== Players Championship 10 ===
Players Championship 10 was contested on Sunday 16 April 2023 at the Robin Park Tennis Centre in Wigan. Martin Schindler and Josh Rock both hit nine-dart finishes in their wins over Boris Krčmar and Jonny Clayton respectively. The tournament was won by Dirk van Duijvenbode, who defeated José de Sousa 8–3 in the final.

Quarter-finals (best of 11 legs)
16	José de Sousa 90.05	6
Martin Schindler 92.44	5
4	Damon Heta 91.59	4
Ian White 91.06	6
15	Dimitri Van den Bergh 98.40	6
7	Josh Rock 97.61	4
3	Dirk van Duijvenbode 100.27	6
Martijn Kleermaker 93.18	2

Semi-finals (best of 13 legs)
16	José de Sousa 100.85	7
Ian White 98.23	2
15	Dimitri Van den Bergh 90.98	6
3	Dirk van Duijvenbode 91.01	7

Final (best of 15 legs)
16	José de Sousa 94.37	3
3	Dirk van Duijvenbode 99.92	8

== May ==
=== Players Championship 11 ===
Players Championship 11 was contested on Saturday 20 May 2023 at the Leicester Arena. The tournament was won by Rob Cross, who defeated Mike De Decker 8–3 in the final.

Quarter-finals (best of 11 legs)
Joe Murnan 89.24	1
9	Rob Cross 102.41	6
13	Joe Cullen 103.55	1
Radek Szagański 107.80	6
31	Mike De Decker 105.27	6
7	Gerwyn Price 96.42	5
Niels Zonneveld 90.79	6
Jimmy Hendriks 79.12	3

Semi-finals (best of 13 legs)
9	Rob Cross 94.30	7
Radek Szagański 99.52	6
31	Mike De Decker 95.26	7
Niels Zonneveld 95.77	5

Final (best of 15 legs)
9	Rob Cross 101.59	8
31	Mike De Decker 86.94	3

=== Players Championship 12 ===
Players Championship 12 was contested on Sunday 21 May 2023 at the Leicester Arena. The tournament was won by Jonny Clayton, who defeated Josh Rock 8–5 in the final.

Quarter-finals (best of 11 legs)
1	Dave Chisnall 92.25	2
9	Jonny Clayton 93.02	6
4	Damon Heta 92.06	6
21	Chris Dobey 95.31	5
Boris Krčmar 94.20	5
7	Josh Rock 97.22	6
14	Andrew Gilding 87.68	6
11	Joe Cullen 94.09	3

Semi-finals (best of 13 legs)
9	Jonny Clayton 103.45	7
4	Damon Heta 99.87	6
7	Josh Rock 101.29	7
14	Andrew Gilding 89.57	5

Final (best of 15 legs)
9	Jonny Clayton 98.30	8
7	Josh Rock 99.52	5

== June ==
=== Players Championship 13 ===
Players Championship 13 was contested on Monday 12 June 2023 at Halle 39 in Hildesheim. Dave Chisnall hit a nine-dart finish in his match against Ricardo Pietreczko. The tournament was won by Michael Smith, who defeated Gary Anderson 8–7 in the final.

Quarter-finals (best of 11 legs)
Danny Lauby 88.19	4
9	Michael Smith 86.98	6
Christian Perez 88.31	2
Connor Scutt 96.00	6
18	Chris Dobey 99.17	5
23	Gary Anderson 96.47	6
3	Damon Heta 96.44	6
6	Gerwyn Price 92.17	4

Semi-finals (best of 13 legs)
9	Michael Smith 92.07	7
Connor Scutt 91.11	3
23	Gary Anderson 101.38	7
3	Damon Heta 95.38	3

Final (best of 15 legs)
9	Michael Smith 93.87	8
23	Gary Anderson 93.96	7

=== Players Championship 14 ===
Players Championship 14 was contested on Tuesday 13 June 2023 at Halle 39 in Hildesheim. Josh Rock and Bradley Brooks both hit nine-dart finishes in their matches against Jurjen van der Velde and Daryl Gurney respectively. The tournament was won by Damon Heta, who defeated Luke Woodhouse 8–2 in the final.

Quarter-finals (best of 11 legs)
Luke Woodhouse 86.45	6
9	Danny Noppert 89.65	4
Mensur Suljović 103.93	6
12	Andrew Gilding 87.97	4
Mario Vandenbogaerde 82.27	2
Christian Kist 86.33	6
3	Damon Heta 100.20	6
Mickey Mansell 77.75	0

Semi-finals (best of 13 legs)
Luke Woodhouse 82.55	7
Mensur Suljović 78.45	2
Christian Kist 94.58	4
3	Damon Heta 92.50	7

Final (best of 15 legs)
Luke Woodhouse 77.09	2
3	Damon Heta 89.83	8

== July ==
=== Players Championship 15 ===
Players Championship 15 was contested on Monday 10 July 2023 at the Leicester Arena. The tournament was won by Luke Humphries, who hit a nine-dart finish in his win over Matt Campbell, defeating Dave Chisnall 8–7 in the final.

Quarter-finals (best of 11 legs)
1	Dave Chisnall 97.88	6
9	Joe Cullen 103.25	3
Berry van Peer 97.68	3
12	Ryan Searle 95.89	6
2	Luke Humphries 105.64	6
7	Jonny Clayton 100.03	3
Radek Szagański 83.65	2
22	Brendan Dolan 90.00	6

Semi-finals (best of 13 legs)
1	Dave Chisnall 103.32	7
12	Ryan Searle 94.91	3
2	Luke Humphries 94.62	7
22	Brendan Dolan 83.61	2

Final (best of 15 legs)
1	Dave Chisnall 96.78	7
2	Luke Humphries 98.46	8

=== Players Championship 16 ===
Players Championship 16 was contested on Tuesday 11 July 2023 at the Leicester Arena. The tournament was won by Damon Heta, who defeated Ryan Joyce 8–4 in the final.

Quarter-finals (best of 11 legs)
17	Andrew Gilding 97.31	5
8	Joe Cullen 92.06	6
4	Damon Heta 95.64	6
21	James Wade 96.27	3
15	José de Sousa 109.35	6
Jonny Clayton 99.69	3
3	Dirk van Duijvenbode 89.85	4
Ryan Joyce 84.29	6

Semi-finals (best of 13 legs)
8	Joe Cullen 87.86	2
4	Damon Heta 97.38	7
15	José de Sousa 93.65	4
Ryan Joyce 93.00	7

Final (best of 15 legs)
4	Damon Heta 103.55	8
Ryan Joyce 88.48	4

== August ==
=== Players Championship 17 ===
Players Championship 17 was contested on Saturday 26 August 2023 at Halle 39 in Hildesheim. The tournament was won by Gerwyn Price, who defeated Josh Rock 8–5 in the final.

Quarter-finals (best of 11 legs)
17	Daryl Gurney 95.34	2
Ritchie Edhouse 96.86	6
Jeff Smith 86.67	1
5	Gerwyn Price 105.53	6
Danny van Trijp 100.15	6
23	William O'Connor 86.21	1
3	Josh Rock 92.96	6
11	Andrew Gilding 96.10	4

Semi-finals (best of 13 legs)
Ritchie Edhouse 91.74	6
5	Gerwyn Price 99.10	7
Danny van Trijp 85.69	1
3	Josh Rock 88.22	7

Final (best of 15 legs)
5	Gerwyn Price 94.48	8
3	Josh Rock 95.44	5

=== Players Championship 18 ===
Players Championship 18 was contested on Sunday 27 August 2023 at Halle 39 in Hildesheim. The tournament was won by Gerwyn Price, who defeated Gian van Veen 8–1 in the final.

Quarter-finals (best of 11 legs)
16	Stephen Bunting 91.64	6
Richard Veenstra 91.99	3
4	Gerwyn Price 98.02	6
5	Rob Cross 85.97	0
Gian van Veen 106.04	6
Jeffrey de Zwaan 95.56	2
Darryl Pilgrim 84.69	0
6	Joe Cullen 95.94	6

Semi-finals (best of 13 legs)
16	Stephen Bunting 90.38	2
4	Gerwyn Price 101.44	7
Gian van Veen 105.05	7
6	Joe Cullen 96.97	1

Final (best of 15 legs)
4	Gerwyn Price 98.52	8
Gian van Veen 93.66	1

== September ==
=== Players Championship 19 ===
Players Championship 19 was contested on Sunday 3 September 2023 at the Barnsley Metrodome. Vincent van der Voort hit a nine-dart finish in his loss to Radek Szagański. The tournament was won by Callan Rydz, who defeated Dave Chisnall 8–7 in the final.

Quarter-finals (best of 11 legs)
1	Dave Chisnall 105.71	6
8	Joe Cullen 99.42	2
Ryan Joyce 96.06	6
28	Brendan Dolan 93.82	5
15	Ross Smith 93.34	4
Callan Rydz 98.68	6
19	James Wade 87.58	6
Cameron Menzies 87.42	4

Semi-finals (best of 13 legs)
1	Dave Chisnall 103.27	7
Ryan Joyce 92.34	2
Callan Rydz 100.17	7
19	James Wade 96.70	4

Final (best of 15 legs)
1	Dave Chisnall 92.51	7
Callan Rydz 91.90	8

=== Players Championship 20 ===
Players Championship 20 was contested on Monday 4 September 2023 at the Barnsley Metrodome. The tournament was won by Luke Humphries, who hit a nine-dart finish in his win over Andy Boulton, defeating Kevin Doets 8–6 in the final.

Quarter-finals (best of 11 legs)
Kevin Doets 96.86	6
24	Gabriel Clemens 87.34	1
Jermaine Wattimena 93.22	3
28	Mike De Decker 90.22	6
31	Callan Rydz 95.06	6
7	Rob Cross 104.42	5
3	Luke Humphries 99.79	6
11	Michael Smith 92.21	2

Semi-finals (best of 13 legs)
Kevin Doets 91.08	7
28	Mike De Decker 89.49	5
31	Callan Rydz 97.78	1
3	Luke Humphries 107.14	7

Final (best of 15 legs)
Kevin Doets 92.97	6
3	Luke Humphries 94.79	8

=== Players Championship 21 ===
Players Championship 21 was contested on Tuesday 5 September 2023 at the Barnsley Metrodome. Robert Owen hit a nine-dart finish in his loss to Ritchie Edhouse. The tournament was won by Gerwyn Price, who defeated Daniel Klose 8–6 in the final.

Quarter-finals (best of 11 legs)
16	Ross Smith 98.40	5
25	Daryl Gurney 91.68	6
4	Gerwyn Price 99.84	6
12	Danny Noppert 91.64	1
2	Luke Humphries 95.84	2
10	Peter Wright 96.92	6
30	Chris Dobey 95.96	4
Daniel Klose 93.43	6

Semi-finals (best of 13 legs)
25	Daryl Gurney 94.52	3
4	Gerwyn Price 99.04	7
10	Peter Wright 91.52	3
Daniel Klose 100.89	7

Final (best of 15 legs)
4	Gerwyn Price 96.57	8
Daniel Klose 89.99	6

=== Players Championship 22 ===
Players Championship 22 was contested on Wednesday 27 September 2023 at the Barnsley Metrodome. Jeff Smith hit a nine-dart finish in his win against Ross Montgomery. The tournament was won by Danny Noppert, who defeated Christian Kist 8–7 in the final.

Quarter-finals (best of 11 legs)
1	Damon Heta 93.43	6
25	Raymond van Barneveld 87.25	5
Christian Kist 101.20	6
Kevin Doets 91.84	4
15	James Wade 92.68	4
7	Danny Noppert 93.84	6
19	Gary Anderson 109.31	5
6	Michael Smith 99.80	6

Semi-finals (best of 13 legs)
1	Damon Heta 88.36	2
Christian Kist 93.92	7
7	Danny Noppert 102.34	7
6	Michael Smith 86.05	1

Final (best of 15 legs)
Christian Kist 97.14	7
7	Danny Noppert 95.74	8

=== Players Championship 23 ===
Players Championship 23 was contested on Thursday 28 September 2023 at the Barnsley Metrodome. The tournament was won by Dave Chisnall, who defeated Luke Humphries 8–3 in the final.

Quarter-finals (best of 11 legs)
1	Dave Chisnall 100.20	6
25	Brendan Dolan 83.79	0
29	Ricardo Pietreczko 98.49	3
Christian Kist 109.20	6
2	Luke Humphries 101.36	6
7	Jonny Clayton 89.38	3
19	Gary Anderson 106.03	6
27	Chris Dobey 95.13	1

Semi-finals (best of 13 legs)
1	Dave Chisnall 101.97	7
Christian Kist 97.21	6
19	Gary Anderson 96.19	4
2	Luke Humphries 96.55	7

Final (best of 15 legs)
1	Dave Chisnall 103.98	8
2	Luke Humphries 101.94	3

=== Players Championship 24 ===
Players Championship 24 was contested on Friday 29 September 2023 at the Barnsley Metrodome. The tournament was won by Gary Anderson, who defeated Ryan Joyce 8–4 in the final.

Quarter-finals (best of 11 legs)
17	Gary Anderson 102.73	6
Martin Lukeman 96.53	5
20	Daryl Gurney 93.46	3
12	Stephen Bunting 101.65	6
31	Ryan Joyce 105.76	6
7	Michael van Gerwen 101.85	3
3	Damon Heta 101.66	1
6	Jonny Clayton 100.57	6

Semi-finals (best of 13 legs)
17	Gary Anderson 95.69	7
12	Stephen Bunting 94.41	5
31	Ryan Joyce 98.38	7
6	Jonny Clayton 99.94	3

Final (best of 15 legs)
17	Gary Anderson 103.68	8
31	Ryan Joyce 92.81	4

== October ==
=== Players Championship 25 ===
Players Championship 25 was contested on Wednesday 18 October 2023 at the Barnsley Metrodome. Gary Anderson and Brendan Dolan both hit nine-dart finishes in their matches against Keane Barry and Martijn Kleermaker respectively. The tournament was won by Gary Anderson, who defeated Josh Rock 8–4 in the final.

Quarter-finals (best of 11 legs)
Martijn Kleermaker 87.75	3
25	Brendan Dolan 99.47	6
4	Josh Rock 98.73	6
5	Rob Cross 93.71	3
15	Gary Anderson 107.02	6
7	Danny Noppert 94.34	4
Cam Crabtree 78.04	3
Jim Williams 86.69	6

Semi-finals (best of 13 legs)
25	Brendan Dolan 94.88	5
4	Josh Rock 96.40	7
15	Gary Anderson 96.28	7
Jim Williams 96.03	5

Final (best of 15 legs)
4	Josh Rock 91.16	4
15	Gary Anderson 97.39	8

=== Players Championship 26 ===
Players Championship 26 was contested on Thursday 19 October 2023 at the Barnsley Metrodome. The tournament was won by Ryan Joyce, who defeated Gerwyn Price 8–7 in the final.

Quarter-finals (best of 11 legs)
Ryan Joyce 95.96	6
24	José de Sousa 91.65	5
Ritchie Edhouse 97.02	6
12	Peter Wright 95.19	4
2	Luke Humphries 105.29	6
10	Gary Anderson 99.22	2
3	Gerwyn Price 99.72	6
27	Chris Dobey 91.57	3

Semi-finals (best of 13 legs)
Ryan Joyce 105.54	7
Ritchie Edhouse 101.24	4
2	Luke Humphries 98.12	6
3	Gerwyn Price 105.23	7

Final (best of 15 legs)
Ryan Joyce 95.80	8
3	Gerwyn Price 96.70	7

=== Players Championship 27 ===
Players Championship 27 was contested on Friday 20 October 2023 at the Barnsley Metrodome. Daryl Gurney hit a nine-dart finish in his match against Nick Fullwell. The tournament was won by Radek Szagański, who defeated Connor Scutt 8–5 in the final.

Quarter-finals (best of 11 legs)
Connor Scutt 95.87	6
9	Gary Anderson 98.81	4
13	Ryan Searle 101.72	5
28	Gian van Veen 100.86	6
15	Ricardo Pietreczko 89.33	6
Niels Zonneveld 88.31	4
Maik Kuivenhoven 78.00	1
Radek Szagański 92.73	6

Semi-finals (best of 13 legs)
Connor Scutt 93.34	7
28	Gian van Veen 91.60	5
15	Ricardo Pietreczko 89.38	3
Radek Szagański 96.91	7

Final (best of 15 legs)
Connor Scutt 89.84	5
Radek Szagański 98.28	8

=== Players Championship 28 ===
Players Championship 28 was contested on Saturday 21 October 2023 at the Barnsley Metrodome. The tournament was won by Ross Smith, who hit a nine-dart finish in his win over Robbie Knops, defeating Damon Heta 8–6 in the final.

Quarter-finals (best of 11 legs)
Dom Taylor 94.22	6
25	Raymond van Barneveld 92.30	2
13	Ross Smith 102.82	6
Ricky Evans 87.20	2
2	Damon Heta 89.42	6
26	Luke Woodhouse 87.07	2
Mickey Mansell 96.92	6
11	Ricardo Pietreczko 88.43	1

Semi-finals (best of 13 legs)
Dom Taylor 93.67	6
13	Ross Smith 90.48	7
2	Damon Heta 93.43	7
Mickey Mansell 85.31	2

Final (best of 15 legs)
13	Ross Smith 104.68	8
2	Damon Heta 96.68	6

== November ==
=== Players Championship 29 ===
Players Championship 29 was contested on Wednesday 1 November 2023 at the Barnsley Metrodome. The tournament was won by Gerwyn Price, who defeated Dave Chisnall 8–3 in the final.

Quarter-finals (best of 11 legs)
1	Dave Chisnall 86.85	6
Maik Kuivenhoven 85.51	4
13	Ryan Searle 96.51	2
5	Rob Cross 100.75	6
2	Gerwyn Price 101.97	6
26	Gian van Veen 96.94	1
3	Damon Heta 98.82	6
Radek Szagański 93.18	2

Semi-finals (best of 13 legs)
1	Dave Chisnall 97.70	7
5	Rob Cross 98.30	5
2	Gerwyn Price 92.96	7
3	Damon Heta 98.11	4

Final (best of 15 legs)
1	Dave Chisnall 87.39	3
2	Gerwyn Price 100.31	8

=== Players Championship 30 ===
Players Championship 30 was contested on Thursday 2 November 2023 at the Barnsley Metrodome. Ricky Evans hit a nine-dart finish in his match against Callan Rydz. The tournament was won by Dave Chisnall, who defeated Jim Williams 8–4 in the final.

Quarter-finals (best of 11 legs)
1	Dave Chisnall 111.35	6
Scott Waites 96.89	2
20	Gian van Veen 100.00	6
Cam Crabtree 96.89	2
2	Damon Heta 99.49	6
7	Michael Smith 94.72	2
Jim Williams 98.35	6
6	Danny Noppert 97.00	3

Semi-finals (best of 13 legs)
1	Dave Chisnall 97.94	7
20	Gian van Veen 87.84	4
2	Damon Heta 88.87	5
Jim Williams 86.64	7

Final (best of 15 legs)
1	Dave Chisnall 96.46	8
Jim Williams 94.19	4

== Players Championship Order of Merit ==
The top 64 players from the Players Championship Order of Merit, which was solely based on prize money won in the thirty Players Championship events during the season, qualified for the 2023 Players Championship Finals, held in November.

Prize money in the table is in units of £1,000.

Rank	Player	Prize money	Rank	Player	Prize money
1	Gerwyn Price	79.25	33	Martin Schindler	30.5
2	Gary Anderson	77.75	34	Jim Williams	30
3	Damon Heta	74.5	35	Kevin Doets	30
4	Dave Chisnall	73.5	36	Raymond van Barneveld	29
5	Josh Rock	64	37	Connor Scutt	28.75
6	Dirk van Duijvenbode	62.25	38	Richard Veenstra	28.25
7	Luke Humphries	61.75	39	Ian White	27.25
8	Ross Smith	57	40	Michael van Gerwen	27.25
9	Danny Noppert	54.25	41	Mario Vandenbogaerde	27
10	Ryan Searle	53.5	42	Christian Kist	25.75
11	Ryan Joyce	51.75	43	Jamie Hughes	23.75
12	Jonny Clayton	49	44	Niels Zonneveld	23.75
13	Rob Cross	44.75	45	Simon Whitlock	22.75
14	Krzysztof Ratajski	42.25	46	Ritchie Edhouse	22.25
15	James Wade	41.5	47	Steve Lennon	21.5
16	Stephen Bunting	40.5	48	Chris Landman	21.25
17	Gian van Veen	39.75	49	Mickey Mansell	20.75
18	Andrew Gilding	39.5	50	William O'Connor	19.75
19	Brendan Dolan	37.5	51	Maik Kuivenhoven	19.5
20	Luke Woodhouse	37.25	52	Cameron Menzies	19.5
21	Daryl Gurney	36.75	53	Stephen Burton	19.5
22	Joe Cullen	36.75	54	Daniel Klose	19.5
23	Ricardo Pietreczko	35.75	55	Boris Krčmar	19.25
24	Mike De Decker	35.5	56	Matt Campbell	18.75
25	Callan Rydz	35.25	57	Scott Williams	18.5
26	Radek Szagański	34.5	58	Martin Lukeman	18.5
27	Michael Smith	34	59	Jermaine Wattimena	18.25
28	Gabriel Clemens	34	60	Rowby-John Rodriguez	18
29	Chris Dobey	33.5	61	Lee Evans	18
30	José de Sousa	33.25	62	Jules van Dongen	18
31	Dimitri Van den Bergh	32.5	63	Steve Beaton	17.75
32	Kim Huybrechts	32	64	Ricky Evans	17.5

== Top averages ==
The table lists all players who achieved a three-dart average of at least 110 in a match. In the case one player has multiple records, this is indicated by the number in brackets.

#	Player	Round	Average	Event	Result	Ref
1	Luke Humphries	2	119.15	1	Won	
2	Dave Chisnall	1	117.41	8	Won	
3	Daryl Gurney	2	117.12	27	Won	
4	Ryan Searle	1	116.36	29	Won	
5	Damon Heta	4	116.12	29	Won	
6	Dirk van Duijvenbode	3	115.70	6	Won	
7	Cameron Menzies	3	114.58	19	Won	
8	George Killington	2	114.15	19	Won	
9	Jim Williams	1	114.13	22	Won	
10	Raymond van Barneveld	1	113.58	10	Won	
11	Gerwyn Price	1	113.57	13	Won	
12	Gary Anderson	3	113.54	25	Won	
13	Dave Chisnall (2)	3	113.18	7	Won	
14	Dirk van Duijvenbode (2)	2	112.73	9	Won	
15	Michael van Gerwen	3	112.32	24	Won	
16	Josh Rock	3	112.35	17	Won	
17	Kim Huybrechts	1	112.20	3	Won	
18	Jonny Clayton	3	111.95	3	Won	
19	Gary Anderson (2)	4	111.92	5	Won	
20	Rob Cross	3	111.83	26	Lost	
21	Dirk van Duijvenbode (3)	2	111.55	23	Won	
22	Michael van Gerwen (2)	4	111.42	24	Won	
23	Gary Anderson (3)	3	111.38	23	Won	
24	Michael Smith	2	111.38	27	Lost	
25	Dave Chisnall (3)	Quarter-Final	111.35	30	Won	
26	Stephen Bunting	1	111.34	28	Won	
27	Dirk van Duijvenbode (4)	3	111.33	9	Won	
28	Gian van Veen	1	111.33	20	Won	
29	Stephen Bunting (2)	2	111.29	7	Won	
30	Stephen Bunting (3)	3	111.11	22	Won	
31	Callan Rydz	3	111.06	1	Won	
32	Rob Cross (2)	4	111.00	12	Lost	
33	Ricardo Pietreczko	2	110.97	16	Won	
34	Josh Rock (2)	3	110.72	3	Won	
35	Gary Anderson (4)	4	110.50	8	Won	
36	Joe Cullen	3	110.35	19	Won	
37	Luke Humphries (2)	2	110.30	7	Won	
