= 2022 PDC Calendar (January–May) =

List of darts tournaments

This is a list of the 2022 Professional Darts Corporation calendar of events held between January and May, with player progression documented from the quarterfinals stage where applicable.

The list includes European tour events, Players Championships events, World Series of Darts events and PDC majors. It also includes PDC secondary tours (Challenge Tour, Development Tour, and Women's Series) as well as PDC affiliate tours (Championship Dart Circuit, Dart Players Australia, Dart Players New Zealand, PDC Asia, EuroAsian Darts Corporation, and PDC Nordic & Baltic) and PDC qualifying events.

Legend
Premier Events
World Series of Darts
European Tour Events
Players Championships
Challenge Tour
Development Tour
Women's Series
Qualifying Events
Affiliate Tours

== January ==
Date	Tournament	Champions	Runners-up	Semi-finalists	Quarter-finalists
9–15	2022 European Q-School (Germany) Niedernhausen	Does not apply			
9–15	2022 UK Q-School (England) Milton Keynes	Does not apply			
21	Challenge Tour 1 (England) Milton Keynes	Scott Williams	Robert Owen	Jim McEwan; Danny Lauby	James Richardson; Michael Flynn; Darren Johnson; Robert Rickwood
21	Challenge Tour 2 (England) Milton Keynes	Scott Williams	Lee Evans	Chris Gilliland; Karel Sedláček	Scott Marsh; Andy Jenkins; Thibault Tricole; Jim Moston
22	Challenge Tour 3 (England) Milton Keynes	Steve Haggerty	Haupai Puha	Lee Evans; Matthew Edgar	Andy Jenkins; Daniel Klose; Jim McEwan; Graham Hall
22	Challenge Tour 4 (England) Milton Keynes	Stu Wilson	Peter Burgoyne	Ryan de Vreede; Gavin Carlin	Roman Benecký; Jeremy van der Winkel; Leighton Bennett; Carlo van Peer
23	Challenge Tour 5 (England) Milton Keynes	Jim McEwan	Stephen Burton	Matthew Edgar; Darren Penhall	Keelan Kay; Jason Hogg; Steven Noster; Thomas Lovely
28	2022 European Tour 2 – Nordic & Baltic Qualifier (Denmark) Slangerup	Does not apply			
28–30	2022 Masters (England) Milton Keynes	Joe Cullen	Dave Chisnall	Jonny Clayton; José de Sousa	Gerwyn Price; Michael Smith; Simon Whitlock; Michael van Gerwen
29	PDC Nordic & Baltic ProTour 1 (Denmark) Slangerup	Vladimir Andersen	Daniel Larsson	Ricky Nauman; Benjamin Drue Reus	Matthías Örn Friðriksson; Allan Daugbjerg Olsen; Brian Løkken; Marko Kantele
29	2022 European Tour 3 – Nordic & Baltic Qualifier (Denmark) Slangerup	Does not apply			
30	PDC Nordic & Baltic ProTour 2 (Denmark) Slangerup	Madars Razma	Darius Labanauskas	Benjamin Drue Reus; Daniel Larsson	Vladimir Andersen; Matthías Örn Friðriksson; Andreas Toft Jørgensen; Ricky Nauman

== February ==
Date	Tournament	Champions	Runners-up	Semi-finalists	Quarter-finalists
3	Premier League Night 1 (Wales) Cardiff	Peter Wright	Jonny Clayton	James Wade; Gary Anderson	Joe Cullen; Gerwyn Price; Michael Smith; Michael van Gerwen
5	2022 PDC Players Championship 1 (England) Barnsley	Luke Humphries	Ryan Searle	Peter Wright; Daryl Gurney	Krzysztof Ratajski; Jonny Clayton; Gary Anderson; Joe Cullen
6	2022 PDC Players Championship 2 (England) Barnsley	Peter Wright	Gerwyn Price	Boris Krčmar; Damon Heta	Stephen Burton; Niels Zonneveld; Stephen Bunting; Rob Cross
10	Premier League Night 2 (England) Liverpool	Jonny Clayton	Joe Cullen	Michael van Gerwen; Gerwyn Price	Peter Wright; Michael Smith; James Wade; Gary Anderson
11	2022 European Tour 2 – Tour Card Qualifier (England) Wigan	Does not apply			
11	2022 European Tour 3 – Tour Card Qualifier (England) Wigan	Does not apply			
12	2022 PDC Players Championship 3 (England) Wigan	Joe Cullen	Damon Heta	Michael van Gerwen; Connor Scutt	James Wade; Joe Murnan; Keane Barry; José de Sousa
13	2022 PDC Players Championship 4 (England) Wigan	Joe Cullen	Dimitri Van den Bergh	Gerwyn Price; Krzysztof Ratajski	Luke Humphries; Rob Cross; Dave Chisnall; Daryl Gurney
17	Premier League Night 3 (Northern Ireland) Belfast	Gerwyn Price	James Wade	Michael van Gerwen; Peter Wright	Michael Smith; Joe Cullen; Gary Anderson; Jonny Clayton
18	Development Tour 1 (England) Wigan	Bradley Brooks	Christopher Holt	Sebastian Białecki; Nathan Rafferty	Jacob Gwynne; Justin Hewitt; Niels Zonneveld; Jurjen van der Velde
18	2022 European Tour 4 – Nordic & Baltic Qualifier (Sweden) Gothenburg	Does not apply			
18	Development Tour 2 (England) Wigan	Keane Barry	Conor Heneghan	Jarred Cole; Jurjen van der Velde	Dom Taylor; Dylan Slevin; Tomáš Houdek; Niels Zonneveld
19	2022 European Tour 5 – Nordic & Baltic Qualifier (Sweden) Gothenburg	Does not apply			
19	Development Tour 3 (England) Wigan	Josh Rock	Lewy Williams	Adam Gawlas; Keenan Thomas	Keelan Kay; Bradley Brooks; Nathan Rafferty; Tomáš Houdek
19	2022 European Tour 6 – Nordic & Baltic Qualifier (Sweden) Gothenburg	Does not apply			
19	Development Tour 4 (England) Wigan	Kevin Doets	Josh Rock	Nathan Girvan; Jarred Cole	Keane Barry; Niels Zonneveld; Lewy Williams; Bradley Brooks
19	2022 European Tour 7 – Nordic & Baltic Qualifier (Sweden) Gothenburg	Does not apply			
20	Development Tour 5 (England) Wigan	Josh Rock	Nathan Girvan	Kevin Doets; Bradley Brooks	Alec Small; Owen Roelofs; Fabian Schmutzler; Oliver King
20	2022 European Tour 8 – Nordic & Baltic Qualifier (Sweden) Gothenburg	Does not apply			
20	2022 European Tour 9 – Nordic & Baltic Qualifier (Sweden) Gothenburg	Does not apply			
23	2022 European Tour 1 – Associate Member Qualifier (Germany) Riesa	Does not apply			
23	2022 European Tour 2 – Associate Member Qualifier (Germany) Riesa	Does not apply			
23	2022 European Tour 3 – Associate Member Qualifier (Germany) Riesa	Does not apply			
24	2022 European Tour 1 – Host Nation Qualifier (Germany) Riesa	Does not apply			
24	2022 European Tour 2 – Host Nation Qualifier (Germany) Riesa	Does not apply			
24	2022 European Tour 3 – Host Nation Qualifier (Germany) Riesa	Does not apply			
25–27	2022 International Darts Open (Germany) Riesa	Gerwyn Price	Peter Wright	Nathan Aspinall; Jonny Clayton	James Wade; Danny Noppert; Dimitri Van den Bergh; Michael Smith
26	EADC Tour 1 (Russia) Moscow	Aleksei Kadochnikov	Anton Kolesov	Boris Koltsov; Maxim Aldoshin	Vitaliy Khohryakov; Roman Obukhov; Eldar Abdullaev; Vladimir Akshulakov
26	EADC Tour 2 (Russia) Moscow	Dmitriy Sitkarev	Roman Obukhov	Eldar Abdullaev; Artem Klyuev	Boris Koltsov; Anton Kolesov; Aleksei Kadochnikov; Rinat Akhmartyanov
27	EADC Tour 3 (Russia) Moscow	Boris Koltsov	Andrey Pontus	Maxim Aldoshin; Evgeniy Demidenko	Evgenii Izotov; Victor Kovalev; Roman Obukhov; Rinat Akhmartyanov

== March ==
Date	Tournament	Champions	Runners-up	Semi-finalists	Quarter-finalists
3	Premier League Night 4 (England) Exeter	Michael van Gerwen	Peter Wright	Michael Smith; James Wade	Jonny Clayton; Joe Cullen; Gerwyn Price; Gary Anderson
4–6	2022 UK Open (England) Minehead	Danny Noppert	Michael Smith	Keane Barry; William O'Connor	James Wade; Sebastian Białecki; Damon Heta; Gerwyn Price
5	2022 European Tour 2 – Eastern Europe Qualifier (Hungary) Budapest	Does not apply			
5	2022 European Tour 3 – Eastern Europe Qualifier (Hungary) Budapest	Does not apply			
6	2022 European Tour 4 – Eastern Europe Qualifier (Hungary) Budapest	Does not apply			
6	2022 European Tour 5 – Eastern Europe Qualifier (Hungary) Budapest	Does not apply			
10	Premier League Night 5 (England) Brighton	Michael van Gerwen	Michael Smith	Jonny Clayton; Joe Cullen	Gary Anderson; Peter Wright; James Wade; Gerwyn Price
11–13	2022 German Darts Championship (Germany) Hildesheim	Michael van Gerwen	Rob Cross	Daryl Gurney; Dimitri Van den Bergh	Karel Sedláček; Jonny Clayton; Michael Smith; Peter Wright
12	Women's Series 1 (England) Barnsley	Lisa Ashton	Rhian Griffiths	Lorraine Winstanley; Chloe O'Brien	Tracy North; Fallon Sherrock; Aileen de Graaf; Juliet Findley
12	Women's Series 2 (England) Barnsley	Lisa Ashton	Robyn Byrne	Maria O'Brien; Fallon Sherrock	Jane Densley; Chloe O'Brien; Steph Clarke; Lorraine Winstanley
13	Women's Series 3 (England) Barnsley	Fallon Sherrock	Jo Locke	Aileen de Graaf; Rhian Griffiths	Lerena Rietbergen; Natalie Gilbert; Roz Bulmer; Laura Turner
13	Women's Series 4 (England) Barnsley	Lisa Ashton	Fallon Sherrock	Lorraine Winstanley; Kirsty Hutchinson	Rhian O'Sullivan; Jane Densley; Aileen de Graaf; Trina Gulliver
17	Premier League Night 6 (England) Nottingham	Gary Anderson	Michael Smith	Gerwyn Price; Peter Wright	James Wade; Michael van Gerwen; Jonny Clayton; Joe Cullen
18	2022 European Tour 4 – Tour Card Qualifier (England) Barnsley	Does not apply			
18	2022 European Tour 5 – Tour Card Qualifier (England) Barnsley	Does not apply			
19	2022 PDC Players Championship 5 (England) Barnsley	Damon Heta	Gary Anderson	Joe Cullen; Dimitri Van den Bergh	Rob Cross; Dirk van Duijvenbode; Daryl Gurney; Mike De Decker
20	2022 PDC Players Championship 6 (England) Barnsley	Jim Williams	Ricky Evans	Martin Schindler; Danny Noppert	Josh Rock; Michael Smith; Ian White; Gabriel Clemens
24	Premier League Night 7 (Netherlands) Rotterdam	Joe Cullen	Michael van Gerwen	Peter Wright; Jonny Clayton	James Wade; Gary Anderson; Gerwyn Price; Michael Smith
26	2022 PDC Players Championship 7 (Germany) Niedernhausen	Gerwyn Price	Madars Razma	Rob Cross; Kevin Doets	Dirk van Duijvenbode; Scott Williams; Gary Blades; José de Sousa
27	2022 PDC Players Championship 8 (Germany) Niedernhausen	Michael van Gerwen	Martin Schindler	Adrian Lewis; Luke Humphries	Daryl Gurney; Stephen Bunting; Brendan Dolan; James Wade
31	Premier League Night 8 (England) Birmingham	Jonny Clayton	James Wade	Joe Cullen; Peter Wright	Michael van Gerwen; Gerwyn Price; Gary Anderson; Michael Smith

== April ==
Date	Tournament	Champions	Runners-up	Semi-finalists	Quarter-finalists
1	Challenge Tour 6 (Germany) Hildesheim	Scott Williams	Scott Marsh	Nathan Girvan; Peter Jacques	Graham Usher; Michael Flynn; Jeremy van der Winkel; Kenny Neyens
1	2022 PDC Players Championship 9 (England) Barnsley	Danny Jansen	Andrew Gilding	Dave Chisnall; Danny Noppert	Mario Vandenbogaerde; Chris Dobey; Michael van Gerwen; José de Sousa
1	Challenge Tour 7 (Germany) Hildesheim	(Switzerland) Stefan Bellmont	(Czech Republic) Karel Sedláček	(Poland) Sebastian Białecki (Scotland) Nathan Girvan	(Netherlands) Jeremy van der Winkel (Belgium) Kenny Neyens (Spain) Toni Alcinas (Republic of Ireland) Michael Flynn
2	Challenge Tour 8 (Germany) Hildesheim	Stephen Burton	Danny van Trijp	David Pallett; Thomas Lovely	Dan Read; Sebastian Białecki; Patrick Peters; Kevin Blomme
2	2022 PDC Players Championship 10 (England) Barnsley	Michael van Gerwen	Peter Wright	Damon Heta; José de Sousa	Jeff Smith; Nathan Aspinall; Adrian Lewis; Luke Humphries
2	Challenge Tour 9 (Germany) Hildesheim	Danny van Trijp	Lukas Wenig	Christian Kist; Kenny Neyens	Matthew Edgar; Jelle Klaasen; Roy van de Griendt; Jeremy van der Winkel
3	2022 PDC Players Championship 11 (England) Barnsley	Ryan Searle	Nathan Aspinall	Rob Cross; Dave Chisnall	Josh Rock; Joe Cullen; Vincent van der Voort; Callan Rydz
3	Challenge Tour 10 (Germany) Hildesheim	Andy Jenkins	Karel Sedláček	Gavin Carlin; Robert Owen	Scott Marsh; Paulo Ferreira; Gary Blades; Stephen Burton
7	Premier League Night 9 (England) Leeds	Michael van Gerwen	James Wade	Peter Wright; Jonny Clayton	Michael Smith; Gary Anderson; Joe Cullen; Gerwyn Price
8	2022 European Tour 6 – Tour Card Qualifier (England) Barnsley	Does not apply			
8	2022 European Tour 7 – Tour Card Qualifier (England) Barnsley	Does not apply			
9	2022 PDC Players Championship 12 (England) Barnsley	Dirk van Duijvenbode	Ryan Searle	Michael Smith; Damon Heta	Gordon Mathers; Simon Whitlock; Jonny Clayton; José Justicia
10	2022 PDC Players Championship 13 (England) Barnsley	Nathan Aspinall	Matt Campbell	Gabriel Clemens; Brendan Dolan	Martin Lukeman; Martijn Kleermaker; Scott Waites; Rob Cross
14	Premier League Night 10 (England) Manchester	James Wade	Joe Cullen	Gerwyn Price; Jonny Clayton	Peter Wright; Gary Anderson; Michael van Gerwen; Michael Smith
16–18	2022 German Darts Grand Prix (Germany) Munich	Luke Humphries	Martin Lukeman	Damon Heta; Michael van Gerwen	Martin Schindler; Jonny Clayton; Keegan Brown; Wesley Plaisier
21	Premier League Night 11 (Scotland) Aberdeen	Jonny Clayton	Michael van Gerwen	Peter Wright; James Wade	Gary Anderson; Joe Cullen; Michael Smith; Gerwyn Price
22	2022 European Tour 5 – Host Nation Qualifier (Germany) Hildesheim	Does not apply			
22	2022 European Tour 5 – Associate Member Qualifier (Germany) Hildesheim	Does not apply			
22	2022 European Tour 7 – Host Nation Qualifier (Germany) Hildesheim	Does not apply			
22	2022 European Tour 7 – Associate Member Qualifier (Germany) Hildesheim	Does not apply			
23	2022 European Tour 9 – Host Nation Qualifier (Germany) Hildesheim	Does not apply			
23	2022 European Tour 6 – Eastern Europe Qualifier (Hungary) Budapest	Does not apply			
23	2022 European Tour 9 – Associate Member Qualifier (Germany) Hildesheim	Does not apply			
23	2022 European Tour 7 – Eastern Europe Qualifier (Hungary) Budapest	Does not apply			
23	2022 European Tour 11 – Host Nation Qualifier (Germany) Hildesheim	Does not apply			
23	2022 European Tour 11 – Associate Member Qualifier (Germany) Hildesheim	Does not apply			
24	2022 European Tour 4 – Associate Member Qualifier (Germany) Hildesheim	Does not apply			
24	2022 European Tour 8 – Eastern Europe Qualifier (Hungary) Budapest	Does not apply			
24	2022 European Tour 6 – Associate Member Qualifier (Germany) Hildesheim	Does not apply			
24	2022 European Tour 9 – Eastern Europe Qualifier (Hungary) Budapest	Does not apply			
24	2022 European Tour 8 – Associate Member Qualifier (Germany) Hildesheim	Does not apply			
24	2022 European Tour 10 – Associate Member Qualifier (Germany) Hildesheim	Does not apply			
28	Premier League Night 12 (Republic of Ireland) Dublin	James Wade	Jonny Clayton	Gerwyn Price; Michael Smith	Michael van Gerwen; Joe Cullen; Gary Anderson; Peter Wright
28	2022 European Tour 4 – Host Nation Qualifier (Austria) Graz	Does not apply			
29 April– 1 May	2022 Austrian Darts Open (Austria) Graz	Michael van Gerwen	Danny Noppert	Stephen Bunting; Nathan Aspinall	Rob Cross; Dirk van Duijvenbode; Ricky Evans; Joe Cullen
30	Women's Series 5 (England) Wigan	Trina Gulliver	Laura Turner	Jane Densley; Fallon Sherrock	Rhian O'Sullivan; Lorraine Winstanley; Mikuru Suzuki; Kirsty Hutchinson
30	Women's Series 6 (England) Wigan	Lisa Ashton	Laura Turner	Chloe O'Brien; Robyn Byrne	Samantha Kirton; Sarah Roberts; Michelle Andrews; Mikuru Suzuki

== May ==
Date	Tournament	Champions	Runners-up	Semi-finalists	Quarter-finalists
1	Women's Series 7 (England) Wigan	Fallon Sherrock	Lisa Ashton	Jane Densley; Mikuru Suzuki	Vicky Pruim; Rhian Griffiths; Laura Turner; Astrid Trouwborst
1	Women's Series 8 (England) Wigan	Lisa Ashton	Katie Sheldon	Lorraine Winstanley; Fallon Sherrock	Aileen de Graaf; Rhian O'Sullivan; Corrine Hammond; Vicky Pruim
5	Premier League Night 13 (Scotland) Glasgow	Jonny Clayton	Michael van Gerwen	Gary Anderson; Michael Smith	Peter Wright; James Wade; Gerwyn Price; Joe Cullen
6	Development Tour 6 (England) Wigan	Nathan Rafferty	Lewy Williams	Geert Nentjes; Jarred Cole	Jurjen van der Velde; Nathan Girvan; Christopher Holt; Rusty-Jake Rodriguez
6–8	2022 European Darts Open (Germany) Leverkusen	Michael van Gerwen	Dimitri Van den Bergh	Luke Humphries; James Wade	Nathan Aspinall; Dirk van Duijvenbode; Josh Rock; Ryan Searle
6	Development Tour 7 (England) Wigan	Jurjen van der Velde	Geert Nentjes	Nathan Rafferty; Justin van Tergouw	Rusty-Jake Rodriguez; Lewy Williams; Dylan Slevin; Maikel Verberk
7	Development Tour 8 (England) Wigan	Conor Heneghan	Jitse van der Wal	Sebastian Białecki; Rusty-Jake Rodriguez	Bram van Dijk; Geert Nentjes; Charlie Manby; Killian Heffernan
7	Development Tour 9 (England) Wigan	Nathan Girvan	Nathan Rafferty	Keelan Kay; Gergely Lakatos	Adam Gawlas; John Brown; Dom Taylor; Bradley Brooks
8	Development Tour 10 (England) Wigan	Geert Nentjes	Jitse van der Wal	Craig Galliano; Gian van Veen	Nathan Girvan; Dom Taylor; Lewy Williams; Fabian Schmutzler
9	2022 European Tour 8 – Tour Card Qualifier (England) Wigan	Does not apply			
9	2022 European Tour 9 – Tour Card Qualifier (England) Wigan	Does not apply			
10	2022 PDC Players Championship 14 (England) Wigan	Michael Smith	John O'Shea	Damon Heta; Dave Chisnall	James Wilson; Ritchie Edhouse; Krzysztof Ratajski; Maik Kuivenhoven
11	2022 PDC Players Championship 15 (England) Wigan	Michael Smith	Callan Rydz	Alan Soutar; Ryan Joyce	Josh Rock; Florian Hempel; Dirk van Duijvenbode; Damon Heta
12	2022 European Tour 6 – Host Nation Qualifier (Czech Republic) Prague	Does not apply			
12	Premier League Night 14 (England) Sheffield	Gerwyn Price	Michael van Gerwen	Joe Cullen; Michael Smith	James Wade; Gary Anderson; Peter Wright; Jonny Clayton
13–15	2022 Czech Darts Open (Czech Republic) Prague	Luke Humphries	Rob Cross	Vincent van der Voort; José de Sousa	Adam Gawlas; Ross Smith; Michael van Gerwen; Rowby-John Rodriguez
14	CDC Tour 1 (United States) Brownsburg	Matt Campbell	Danny Baggish	Jacob Taylor; Jeff Springer	Keith Way; Chuck Puleo; Jim Widmayer; Alex Spellman
14	CDC Tour 2 (United States) Brownsburg	Leonard Gates	Chuck Puleo	Joey Lynaugh; John Norman Jnr	Danny Baggish; Jim Widmayer; David Cameron; Danny Lauby
15	CDC Tour 3 (United States) Brownsburg	Danny Baggish	Leonard Gates	Chuck Puleo; John Norman Jnr	Kevin Luke; Jeff Springer; Joey Lynaugh; Robbie Phillips
19	Premier League Night 15 (England) London	Joe Cullen	Jonny Clayton	Michael Smith; Peter Wright	Gerwyn Price; Michael van Gerwen; James Wade; Gary Anderson
20–22	2022 European Darts Grand Prix (Germany) Stuttgart	Luke Humphries	Rob Cross	Damon Heta; Peter Wright	Martin Schindler; Rowby-John Rodriguez; Brendan Dolan; Danny Noppert
26	2022 European Tour 8 – Host Nation Qualifier (Netherlands) Zwolle	Does not apply			
26	Premier League Night 16 (England) Newcastle upon Tyne	Michael Smith	Jonny Clayton	Joe Cullen; Gerwyn Price	Gary Anderson; Peter Wright; Michael van Gerwen; James Wade
27–29	2022 Dutch Darts Championship (Netherlands) Zwolle	Michael Smith	Danny Noppert	Andrew Gilding; Callan Rydz	Mervyn King; Dirk van Duijvenbode; Simon Whitlock; Boris Krčmar

== See also ==
- 2022 PDC Calendar (June–December)
- List of players with a 2022 PDC Tour Card
- 2022 PDC Pro Tour
