= 2022 PDC Calendar (June–December) =

List of darts tournaments

This is a list of the 2022 Professional Darts Corporation calendar of events held between June and December, with player progression documented from the quarterfinals stage where applicable.

The list includes European tour events, Players Championships events, World Series of Darts events and PDC majors. It also includes PDC secondary tours (Challenge Tour, Development Tour, and Women's Series) as well as PDC affiliate tours (Championship Darts Circuit, Dartplayers Australia, Dartplayers New Zealand, PDC Asia, Eurasia Darts Corporation, and PDC Nordic & Baltic) and PDC qualifying events.

Legend
Premier Events
World Series of Darts
European Tour Events
Players Championships
Challenge Tour
Development Tour
Women's Series
Qualifying Events
Affiliate Tours

== June ==
Date	Tournament	Champions	Runners-up	Semi-finalists	Quarter-finalists
3	Development Tour 11 (Germany) Hildesheim	Nathan Rafferty	Gian van Veen	Keane Barry; Jurjen van der Velde	Jack Vincent; Lewy Williams; Cavan Phillips; Danny Jansen
3	Development Tour 12 (Germany) Hildesheim	Keane Barry	Ciarán Teehan	Dylan Slevin; Jarred Cole	Lewy Williams; Maikel Mossou; Alec Small; Jurjen van der Velde
3	2022 European Tour 10 – Nordic & Baltic Qualifier (Finland) Vääksy	Does not apply			
3–4	2022 US Darts Masters (United States) New York City	Michael Smith	Michael van Gerwen	Peter Wright; Gerwyn Price	Leonard Gates; Gary Anderson; Jonny Clayton; James Wade
4	PDC Nordic & Baltic ProTour 3 (Finland) Vääksy	Darius Labanauskas	Marko Kantele	Jani Keskinarkaus; Daniel Larsson	Ulf Ceder; Nauris Gleglu; Hannu Suominen; Johan Engström
4	Development Tour 13 (Germany) Hildesheim	Geert Nentjes	Niko Springer	Jarred Cole; Jurjen van der Velde	Lewy Williams; Bradley Brooks; Lewis Gurney; David Schlichting
4	Development Tour 14 (Germany) Hildesheim	Sebastian Białecki	Keane Barry	Bradley Brooks; Nathan Rafferty	Jarred Cole; Geert Nentjes; Josh Rock; Daan Bastiaansen
4	2022 European Tour 11 – Nordic & Baltic Qualifier (Finland) Vääksy	Does not apply			
4	2022 PDC North American Championship (United States) New York City	Leonard Gates	Danny Baggish	David Cameron; Danny Lauby	Jeff Smith; Jules van Dongen; Matt Campbell; Doug Boehm
5	PDC Nordic & Baltic ProTour 4 (Finland) Vääksy	Dennis Nilsson	Madars Razma	Veijo Viinikka; Brian Løkken	Darius Labanauskas; Daniel Larsson; Michael Ladefoged; Benjamin Drue Reus
5	Development Tour 15 (Germany) Hildesheim	Keane Barry	Owen Bates	Cam Crabtree; Owen Roelofs	Conor Heneghan; Lewy Williams; Christopher Holt; Geert Nentjes
10–11	2022 Nordic Darts Masters (Denmark) Copenhagen	Dimitri Van den Bergh	Gary Anderson	Michael Smith; James Wade	Fallon Sherrock; Gerwyn Price; Michael van Gerwen; Peter Wright
11	DPNZ Tour 1 (New Zealand) Auckland	Ben Robb	Haupai Puha	Mark Cleaver; Nevin Filimoeatu	Sonny Matekaure; John Hurring; Stu Irwin; Haunui Hira
12	DPNZ Tour 2 (New Zealand) Auckland	Warren Parry	Ben Robb	Landon Gardiner; Jimmy Samuels	Emilio Hovell; Jack Sheppard; Stu Irwin; Mike O'Grady
13	Premier League Play-Offs (Germany) Berlin	Michael van Gerwen	Joe Cullen	Jonny Clayton; James Wade	Does not apply.
14	2022 PDC Players Championship 16 (Germany) Niedernhausen	Michael Smith	Dirk van Duijvenbode	Keane Barry; Josh Rock	Luke Humphries; John Henderson; Andrew Gilding; Krzysztof Ratajski
15	2022 PDC Players Championship 17 (Germany) Niedernhausen	Scott Williams	Nathan Aspinall	Kim Huybrechts; Chris Dobey	Mike De Decker; Peter Wright; Dirk van Duijvenbode; Rob Cross
16–19	World Cup of Darts (Germany) Frankfurt	(Australia) Heta/Whitlock	(Wales) Price/Clayton	(England) Smith/Wade (Netherlands) Noppert/van Duijvenbode	(Scotland) Wright/Henderson (Belgium) Van den Bergh/Huybrechts (Germany) Clemens/Schindler (Northern Ireland) Gurney/Dolan
24–25	2022 Dutch Darts Masters (Netherlands) Amsterdam	Dimitri Van den Bergh	Dirk van Duijvenbode	James Wade; Danny Noppert	Martijn Kleermaker; Maik Kuivenhoven; Jermaine Wattimena; Vincent van der Voort
25	Women's Series 9 (England) Barnsley	Lisa Ashton	Aileen de Graaf	Lorraine Winstanley; Katie Sheldon	Joanne Locke; Fallon Sherrock; Lerena Rietbergen; Corrine Hammond
25	2022 European Tour 10 – Eastern Europe Qualifier (Czech Republic) Prague	Does not apply			
25	Women's Series 10 (England) Barnsley	Lorraine Winstanley	Rhian O'Sullivan	Aileen de Graaf; Rhian Griffiths	Deta Hedman; Laura Turner; Evonne Taylor; Tina Neylon
25	2022 European Tour 11 – Eastern Europe Qualifier (Czech Republic) Prague	Does not apply			
25	CDC Tour 4 (Canada) Cambridge	Jacob Taylor	Danny Baggish	Steve Warnock; Shaun Narain	Larry Butler; Leonard Gates; Cashmere Ventura; Doug Boehm
25	CDC Tour 5 (Canada) Cambridge	David Cameron	Leonard Gates	Keith Way; Jacob Taylor	Matt Campbell; James Solek; Gary Mawson; Alex Spellman
26	Women's Series 11 (England) Barnsley	Fallon Sherrock	Natalie Gilbert	Lisa Ashton; Aileen de Graaf	Lorraine Winstanley; Laura Turner; Corrine Hammond; Kirsty Hutchinson
26	2022 European Tour 12 – Eastern Europe Qualifier (Czech Republic) Prague	Does not apply			
26	Women's Series 12 (England) Barnsley	Lisa Ashton	Aileen de Graaf	Fallon Sherrock; Katie Sheldon	Corrine Hammond; Denise Cassidy; Chloe O'Brien; Maria O'Brien
26	2022 European Tour 13 – Eastern Europe Qualifier (Czech Republic) Prague	Does not apply			
26	CDC Tour 6 (Canada) Cambridge	David Cameron	Matt Campbell	Jules van Dongen; Leonard Gates	John Norman Jnr; Chuck Puleo; Danny Baggish; Danny Lauby

== July ==
Date	Tournament	Champions	Runners-up	Semi-finalists	Quarter-finalists
1–3	2022 European Darts Matchplay (Germany) Trier	Luke Humphries	Rowby-John Rodriguez	Madars Razma; Stephen Bunting	Nathan Aspinall; Rob Cross; Damon Heta; Ian White
7	2022 European Tour 10 – Tour Card Qualifier (England) Barnsley	Does not apply			
7	2022 European Tour 11 – Tour Card Qualifier (England) Barnsley	Does not apply			
8	2022 PDC Players Championship 18 (England) Barnsley	Dirk van Duijvenbode	Gabriel Clemens	Adrian Lewis; Nathan Aspinall	Luke Humphries; Andrew Gilding; Dave Chisnall; Daryl Gurney
9	2022 PDC Players Championship 19 (England) Barnsley	Danny Noppert	Andrew Gilding	Luke Humphries; Ryan Searle	Jamie Hughes; Rowby-John Rodriguez; Niels Zonneveld; Lee Evans
10	2022 PDC Players Championship 20 (England) Barnsley	Adrian Lewis	Boris Koltsov (Note: Boris Koltsov, of Russia, has competed under a neutral designation since the 2022 Russian invasion of Ukraine.)	Martin Schindler; Nathan Aspinall	Krzysztof Kciuk; Steve Beaton; Jonny Clayton; Jermaine Wattimena
10	2022 European Tour 10 – Host Nation Qualifier (Hungary) Budapest	Does not apply			
11	2022 PDC Players Championship 21 (England) Barnsley	Brendan Dolan	Jonny Clayton	Damon Heta; Dave Chisnall	Keegan Brown; Mensur Suljović; Peter Wright; Nathan Aspinall
15	Challenge Tour 11 (Germany) Hildesheim	Danny van Trijp	Jelle Klaasen	Graham Usher; Karel Sedláček	Roemer Mooijman; Darryl Pilgrim; Chris Landman; Patrick van den Boogard
15	Challenge Tour 12 (Germany) Hildesheim	Gian van Veen	David Pallett	Chas Barstow; Davy Proosten	Jeremy van der Winkel; Daniel Klose; Ciarán Teehan; Steven Beasley
16	Challenge Tour 13 (Germany) Hildesheim	Jurjen van der Velde	Robert Owen	Stephen Burton; Darryl Pilgrim	Dan Read; Fabian Schmutzler; Roemer Mooijman; Davy Proosten
16	Challenge Tour 14 (Germany) Hildesheim	Kenny Neyens	Michael Flynn	Jelle Klaasen; Lukas Wenig	Graham Usher; Franz Rötzsch; Robert Owen; Kevin Garcia
16–24	World Matchplay (England) Blackpool	Michael van Gerwen	Gerwyn Price	Dimitri Van den Bergh; Danny Noppert	Peter Wright; Nathan Aspinall; José de Sousa; Dirk van Duijvenbode
17	Challenge Tour 15 (Germany) Hildesheim	David Pallett	Dennie Olde Kalter	Jan Hlavácek; Lukas Wenig	François Schweyen; Gavin Carlin; Christopher Wickenden; Jacques Labre
24	Women's World Matchplay (England) Blackpool	Fallon Sherrock	Aileen de Graaf	Lisa Ashton; Lorraine Winstanley	Chloe O'Brien; Laura Turner; Katie Sheldon; Rhian Griffiths
29	2022 European Tour 12 – Nordic & Baltic Qualifier (Denmark) Slangerup	Does not apply			
30	PDC Nordic & Baltic ProTour 5 (Denmark) Slangerup	Andreas Harrysson	Darius Labanauskas	Daniel Larsson; Madars Razma	Brian Løkken; Dennis Nilsson; Ulrich Meyn; Vladimir Andersen
30	2022 European Tour 13 – Nordic & Baltic Qualifier (Denmark) Slangerup	Does not apply			
31	PDC Nordic & Baltic ProTour 6 (Denmark) Slangerup	Daniel Larsson	Vladimir Andersen	Darius Labanauskas; Madars Razma	Patrick Heinsøe; Dennis Nilsson; Ulrich Meyn; Janis Mustafejevs

== August ==
Date	Tournament	Champions	Runners-up	Semi-finalists	Quarter-finalists
2	2022 European Tour 12 – Tour Card Qualifier (England) Barnsley	Does not apply			
2	2022 European Tour 13 – Tour Card Qualifier (England) Barnsley	Does not apply			
3	2022 PDC Players Championship 22 (England) Barnsley	Nathan Aspinall	Krzysztof Ratajski	Ryan Searle; Danny Noppert	Luke Humphries; Stephen Bunting; Michael Smith; Dimitri Van den Bergh
4	2022 PDC Players Championship 23 (England) Barnsley	Keegan Brown	Nathan Aspinall	Ted Evetts; Peter Wright	Alan Soutar; Shaun Wilkinson; Michael Smith; Chris Dobey
5	2022 PDC Players Championship 24 (England) Barnsley	Rob Cross	Luke Humphries	Martin Schindler; Chris Dobey	Dimitri Van den Bergh; Madars Razma; Mensur Suljović; José de Sousa
6	2022 World Series of Darts Finals – Tour Card Qualifier (England) Barnsley	Does not apply			
6	DPNZ Tour 3 (New Zealand) Christchurch	Ben Robb	Mark Cleaver	Kayden Milne; Darren Herewini	Jamie Roberts; Stu Irwin; John Hurring; Warren Parry
7	DPNZ Tour 4 (New Zealand) Christchurch	Ben Robb	Warren Parry	Stu Irwin; Darren Herewini	John Hurring; Mark Cleaver; Tukina Weko; Hipi Tewhakaara
12–13	2022 Queensland Darts Masters (Australia) Townsville	Michael van Gerwen	Gerwyn Price	Joe Cullen; Gordon Mathers	Dimitri Van den Bergh; Haupai Puha; Michael Smith; Simon Whitlock
12	PDC Nordic & Baltic ProTour 7 (Latvia) Riga	Darius Labanauskas	Veijo Viinikka	Jyri Ussa; Paavo Myller	Teuvo Haverinen; Andreas Harrysson; Andreas Toft Jørgensen; Vladimir Andersen
13	PDC Nordic & Baltic ProTour 8 (Latvia) Riga	Darius Labanauskas	Daniel Larsson	Madars Razma; Andreas Harrysson	Ivan Springborg Poulsen; Dennis Nilsson; Benjamin Drue Reus; Andreas Toft Jørgensen
13	PDC Nordic & Baltic ProTour 9 (Latvia) Riga	Darius Labanauskas	Vladimir Andersen	Dennis Nilsson; Jani Keskinarkaus	Teemu Harju; Andreas Toft Jørgensen; Daniel Larsson; Andreas Harrysson
13	CDC Tour 7 (United States) Brownsburg	Jacob Taylor	Alex Spellman	Larry Butler; Danny Baggish	John Norman Jnr; Kiley Edmunds; Leonard Gates; Doug Boehm
13	CDC Tour 8 (United States) Brownsburg	David Cameron	Alex Spellman	Gary Mawson; Jeff Springer	Nick Linberg; Jason Brandon; Larry Butler; Danny Baggish
14	PDC Nordic & Baltic ProTour 10 (Latvia) Riga	Marko Kantele	Daniel Larsson	Dennis Nilsson; Johan Engström	Darius Labanauskas; Laimis Zubavicius; Jani Elijoki; Vladimir Andersen
14	CDC Tour 9 (United States) Brownsburg	Larry Butler	Danny Baggish	John Norman Jnr; Alex Spellman	Ryan Vander Weit; Jason Brandon; Nick Linberg; Ross Snook
19–20	2022 New South Wales Darts Masters (Australia) Wollongong	Jonny Clayton	James Wade	Gerwyn Price; Joe Cullen	Dimitri Van den Bergh; Fallon Sherrock; Simon Whitlock; Michael Smith
19	Development Tour 16 (Germany) Hildesheim	Josh Rock	Dylan Dowling	Sebastian Białecki; Conor Heneghan	Jitse van der Wal; Lewy Williams; Nathan Girvan; Owen Bates
19	Development Tour 17 (Germany) Hildesheim	Josh Rock	Nathan Girvan	Christopher Holt; Daniel Perry	Geert Nentjes; Ole Holtkamp; Daan Bastiaansen; Sebastian Białecki
20	Development Tour 18 (Germany) Hildesheim	Gian van Veen	Josh Rock	Adam Gawlas; Owen Roelofs	Dylan Slevin; Keane Barry; Robbe Dasseville; Kevin Doets
20	Development Tour 19 (Germany) Hildesheim	Lewy Williams	Kevin Doets	Keane Barry; Daniel Perry	Josh Rock; Vinay Ramnath; Zac Griffiths; Robin Beger
21	Development Tour 20 (Germany) Hildesheim	Nathan Rafferty	Kevin Doets	Geert Nentjes; Lewy Williams	Ciarán Teehan; Lewis Gurney; Ole Holtkamp; Jurjen van der Velde
26–27	2022 New Zealand Darts Masters; Hamilton	Gerwyn Price	Jonny Clayton	Dimitri Van den Bergh; Michael Smith	Joe Cullen; James Wade; Michael van Gerwen; Kayden Milne
27	Women's Series 13 (Germany) Hildesheim	Beau Greaves	Mikuru Suzuki	Katie Sheldon; Iselin Hauen	Priscilla Steenbergen; Aileen de Graaf; Rhian Griffiths; Noa-Lynn van Leuven
27	Women's Series 14 (Germany) Hildesheim	Beau Greaves	Mikuru Suzuki	Laura Turner; Lisa Ashton	Noa-Lynn van Leuven; Stefanie Rennoch; Priscilla Steenbergen; Yukie Sakaguchi
27	2022 European Tour 12 – Associate Member Qualifier (Germany) Hildesheim	Does not apply			
28	Women's Series 15 (Germany) Hildesheim	Beau Greaves	Mikuru Suzuki	Deta Hedman; Anca Zijlstra	Lerena Rietbergen; Priscilla Steenbergen; Lisa Ashton; Yukie Sakaguchi
28	Women's Series 16 (Germany) Hildesheim	Beau Greaves	Aileen de Graaf	Stefanie Rennoch; Katie Sheldon	Jitka Císařová; Astrid Trouwborst; Rhian Griffiths; Yukie Sakaguchi
28	2022 European Tour 13 – Associate Member Qualifier (Germany) Hildesheim	Does not apply			

== September ==
Date	Tournament	Champions	Runners-up	Semi-finalists	Quarter-finalists
2–4	2022 Hungarian Darts Trophy (Hungary) Budapest	Joe Cullen	William O'Connor	Nathan Aspinall; Dave Chisnall	Ryan Meikle; José de Sousa; Josh Rock; Rusty-Jake Rodriguez
9–11	2022 German Darts Open (Germany) Jena	Peter Wright	Dimitri Van den Bergh	Joe Cullen; José de Sousa	Luke Humphries; Ross Smith; Gerwyn Price; Krzysztof Ratajski
10	CDC Tour 10 (Canada) Waterdown	Danny Baggish	Stowe Buntz	Matt Campbell; John Norman Jnr	Gary Mawson; David Cameron; Alex Spellman; Jacob Taylor
10	CDC Tour 11 (Canada) Waterdown	Jim Long	Stowe Buntz	David Cameron; Danny Baggish	Justin Fawcett; Ryan Vander Weit; Alex Spellman; Leonard Gates
11	CDC Tour 12 (Canada) Waterdown	Jacob Taylor	Gary Mawson	Jim Long; John Norman Jnr	Danny Baggish; David Cameron; Stowe Buntz; Ross Snook
16–18	World Series of Darts Finals (Netherlands) Amsterdam	Gerwyn Price	Dirk van Duijvenbode	Jonny Clayton; James Wade	Ryan Joyce; Michael van Gerwen; Joe Cullen; Michael Smith
16	Challenge Tour 16 (England) Leicester	Robert Owen	Christian Kist	Robert Thornton; John Bowles	Matthew Dennant; David Wawrzewski; Llew Bevan; Prakash Jiwa
16	Challenge Tour 17 (England) Leicester	Wesley Plaisier	Robert Thornton	Karel Sedláček; Martijn Dragt	Lukas Wenig; Dan Read; Jurjen van der Velde; Lewis Pride
17	Challenge Tour 18 (England) Leicester	Jurjen van der Velde	Patrick Peters	Graham Usher; Daniel Klose	Scott Williams; Jan Hlavácek; Alan Tabern; Jim Moston
17	Challenge Tour 19 (England) Leicester	Christian Kist	Danny Lauby	Karel Sedláček; Kai Fan Leung	Thibault Tricole; Jacques Labre; Alan Tabern; Jeroen Mioch
18	Challenge Tour 20 (England) Leicester	Scott Williams	Thibault Tricole	Dan Read; Owen Roelofs	Darryl Pilgrim; Kai Fan Leung; Danny Lauby; David Pallett
22	2022 European Tour 12 – Host Nation Qualifier (Belgium) Wieze	Does not apply			
23–25	2022 Belgian Darts Open (Belgium) Wieze	Dave Chisnall	Andrew Gilding	Danny Noppert; Jonny Clayton	Adrian Lewis; José de Sousa; Gabriel Clemens; Martin Schindler
24–25	2022 PDC Asian Championship (Japan) Fukuoka	Christian Perez	Paolo Nebrida	Lourence Ilagan; Toru Suzuki	Yuichiro Ogawa; Yoshihisa Baba; Yuki Yamada; Jun Matsuda
24	DPNZ Tour 5 (New Zealand) Auckland	Mark Cleaver	John Hurring	Kayden Milne; Darren Herewini	Ben Robb; Tahi Parata; Haunui Hira; Jamie Roberts
25	DPNZ Tour 6 (New Zealand) Auckland	Ben Robb	Haupai Puha	Jimmy Samuels; Darren Herewini	Josh Roberts; Haunui Hira; John Hurring; Kayden Milne

== October ==
Date	Tournament	Champions	Runners-up	Semi-finalists	Quarter-finalists
3–9	World Grand Prix (England) Leicester	Michael van Gerwen	Nathan Aspinall	Gerwyn Price; Peter Wright	Madars Razma; Martin Lukeman; Dimitri Van den Bergh; Chris Dobey
7	Development Tour 21 (England) Wigan	Josh Rock	Rusty-Jake Rodriguez	Bradley Brooks; Dylan Slevin	Daniel Perry; Nathan Girvan; Gian van Veen; Joshua Richardson
7	Development Tour 22 (England) Wigan	Nathan Rafferty	Niko Springer	Josh Rock; Robin Beger	Gian van Veen; Rusty-Jake Rodriguez; Connor Hopkins; Dom Taylor
8	Development Tour 23 (England) Wigan	Nathan Rafferty	Lewy Williams	Brandon Weening; Sebastian Białecki	Nathan Girvan; Owen Bates; Daniel Perry; Jitse van der Wal
8	Development Tour 24 (England) Wigan	Joshua Richardson	Jurjen van der Velde	Thomas Banks; Owen Maiden	Adam Gawlas; Nathan Rafferty; Man Lok Leung; Brandon Weening
9 October/27 November	World Youth Championship (England) Wigan/Minehead	Josh Rock	Nathan Girvan	Callan Rydz; Geert Nentjes	Danny Jansen; Man Lok Leung; Keane Barry; Dylan Slevin
13	2022 European Tour 13 – Host Nation Qualifier; Gibraltar	Does not apply			
14–16	2022 Gibraltar Darts Trophy; Gibraltar	Damon Heta	Peter Wright	Rob Cross; Michael van Gerwen	Luke Humphries; Josh Rock; Nathan Aspinall; Gabriel Clemens
15	DPNZ Tour 7 (New Zealand) Dunedin	Haupai Puha	Kayden Milne	Jack Sheppard; Jimmy Samuels	Andrew Hastings; Stu Irwin; Darren Herewini; Warren Parry
15	Challenge Tour 21 (England) Leicester	Thibault Tricole	Gian van Veen	Owen Roelofs; Carlo van Peer	Reece Robinson; Colin Osborne; Ben West; Jelle Klaasen
15	Challenge Tour 22 (England) Leicester	Jacques Labre	Lee Evans	Robert Owen; Nathan Girvan	Daniel Ayres; Ryan Hogarth; Geoffrey Murray; Christian Kist
11	DPNZ Tour 8 (New Zealand) Dunedin	Ben Robb	Haupai Puha	Jimmy Samuels; Warren Parry	Kayden Milne; Jack Sheppard; Darren Herewini; Nick Kohey
16	Challenge Tour 23 (England) Leicester	Justin Smith	Matthew Dennant	Scott Taylor; Nathan Girvan	Jeremy van der Winkel; Ciarán Teehan; Lee Davies; Jordan Brooks
16	Challenge Tour 24 (England) Leicester	Andy Hamilton	Scott Taylor	Lee Budgen; Wayne Jones	Danny van Trijp; Ryan Hogarth; Jim McEwan; Scott Campbell
20	2022 PDC Players Championship 25 (England) Barnsley	Dave Chisnall	Josh Rock	Gerwyn Price; Damon Heta	Luke Humphries; Mervyn King; Mike De Decker; Gian van Veen
21	2022 PDC Players Championship 26 (England) Barnsley	Damon Heta	Dirk van Duijvenbode	Boris Krčmar; Gerwyn Price	Damian Mol; Alan Soutar; Matt Campbell; Michael Smith
22	2022 PDC Players Championship 27 (England) Barnsley	Rob Cross	Peter Wright	Callan Rydz; Ryan Meikle	Alan Soutar; Stephen Bunting; José de Sousa; Gary Anderson
23	2022 PDC Players Championship 28 (England) Barnsley	Josh Rock	Luke Humphries	Ricardo Pietreczko; Damon Heta	Max Hopp; Ross Smith; Dirk van Duijvenbode; Adrian Lewis
27–30	European Championship (Germany) Dortmund	Ross Smith	Michael Smith	Dirk van Duijvenbode; Chris Dobey	Luke Humphries; Danny Noppert; Dave Chisnall; Peter Wright
29	Women's Series 17 (England) Wigan	Beau Greaves	Mikuru Suzuki	Maria O'Brien; Lorraine Winstanley	Katie Sheldon; Mandy Smith; Deta Hedman; Aileen de Graaf
29	Women's Series 18 (England) Wigan	Beau Greaves	Lisa Ashton	Fallon Sherrock; Lorraine Winstanley	Anastasia Dobromyslova (Note: Anastasia Dobromyslova, of Russia, competed under a neutral designation because of the 2022 Russian invasion of Ukraine.); Rebecca Hoyland; Rhian O'Sullivan; Evonne Taylor
30	Women's Series 19 (England) Wigan	Beau Greaves	Fallon Sherrock	Lisa Ashton; Natalie Gilbert	Anca Zijlstra; Robyn Byrne; Kirsty Hutchinson; Anastasia Dobromyslova
30	Women's Series 20 (England) Wigan	Beau Greaves	Mikuru Suzuki	Robyn Byrne; Rhian O'Sullivan	Aileen de Graaf; Lisa Ashton; Lorraine Winstanley; Trina Gulliver

== November ==
Date	Tournament	Champions	Runners-up	Semi-finalists	Quarter-finalists
4	2022 PDC Players Championship 29 (England) Barnsley	Gerwyn Price	Gian van Veen	Dave Chisnall; Mike De Decker	Jermaine Wattimena; William O'Connor; Martin Schindler; Rob Cross
5	2022 PDC Players Championship 30 (England) Barnsley	James Wade	Steve Beaton	Dave Chisnall; Martin Schindler	Stephen Bunting; Josh Rock; Jermaine Wattimena; Connor Scutt
6	2022 Grand Slam of Darts – Tour Card Qualifier (England) Barnsley	Does not apply			
12–20	2022 Grand Slam of Darts (England) Wolverhampton	Michael Smith	Nathan Aspinall	Raymond van Barneveld; Luke Humphries	Gerwyn Price; Joe Cullen; Alan Soutar; Michael van Gerwen
25–27	2022 Players Championship Finals (England) Minehead	Michael van Gerwen	Rob Cross	Jonny Clayton; Luke Humphries	Callan Rydz; Dirk van Duijvenbode; Joe Cullen; Danny Noppert
28	2023 World Darts Championship – Tour Card Qualifier (England) Barnsley	Does not apply			

== December ==
Date	Tournament	Champions	Runners-up	Semi-finalists	Quarter-finalists
15 December–3 January	2023 PDC World Darts Championship (England) London	Michael Smith	Michael van Gerwen	Gabriel Clemens; Dimitri Van den Bergh	Gerwyn Price; Stephen Bunting; Jonny Clayton; Chris Dobey

== See also ==
- List of players with a 2022 PDC Tour Card
- 2022 PDC Pro Tour
