= 2022 in PDC =

2022 darts series

2022 Professional Darts Corporation season

Tournament information
- Dates: 9 January 2022 – 3 January 2023
- Organisation(s): Professional Darts Corporation
- World Championship: Michael Smith
- World Matchplay: Michael van Gerwen
- Premier League: Michael van Gerwen
- World Cup: Australia (Damon Heta and Simon Whitlock)
- Year-end number one: Michael Smith

The year 2022 was the 31st year in the history of the Professional Darts Corporation (PDC), a darts organisation based in the United Kingdom.

== Changes ==
=== Winmau partnership ===
2022 was the debut year of Winmau supplying the Professional Darts Corporation dartboards after Unicorn's 25-year partnership ended. They debuted at the 2022 Premier League Darts.

=== UK Open amateur qualifiers return ===
After the COVID-19 pandemic ended, the amateur qualifiers returned for the 2022 UK Open, although the format would decrease to 158 players, instead of the 160 players they had prior to the COVID-19 pandemic.

== Premier events ==
=== Ranked events ===
These events contribute to a player's ranking on the PDC Order of Merit. The prize money won in these tournaments is added to the player's total earnings over a two-year period, which determines their ranking.

Date	Event	Venue	Champion	Score	Runner-up	Ref
15 December 2021 — 3 January 2022	2022 World Championship	Alexandra Palace, London, England	Peter Wright (98.34)	7 – 5	Michael Smith (99.22)	
4–6 March 2022	UK Open	Butlin's, Minehead, England	Danny Noppert (84.82)	11 – 10	Michael Smith (90.33)	
16–24 July 2022	World Matchplay	Winter Gardens, Blackpool, England	Michael van Gerwen (101.19)	18 – 14	Gerwyn Price (96.92)	
3–9 October 2022	World Grand Prix	Leicester Arena, Leicester, England	Michael van Gerwen (91.07)	5 – 3	Nathan Aspinall (91.88)	
27–30 October 2022	European Championship	Westfalenhallen, Dortmund, Germany	Ross Smith (101.32)	11 – 8	Michael Smith (100.47)	
12–20 November 2022	Grand Slam	Aldersley Leisure Village, Wolverhampton, England	Michael Smith (96.84)	16 – 5	Nathan Aspinall (90.89)	
25–27 November 2022	Players Championship Finals	Butlin's, Minehead, England	Michael van Gerwen (99.92)	11 – 6	Rob Cross (100.33)	
15 December 2022 – 3 January 2023	2023 World Championship	Alexandra Palace, London, England	Michael Smith (100.87)	7 – 4	Michael van Gerwen (99.58)	

=== Non-ranked ===
These events do not affect the PDC Order of Merit.

Date	Event	Venue	Champion	Score	Runner-up
28–30 January	Masters	Arena MK, Milton Keynes, England	Joe Cullen (96.89)	11 – 4	Dave Chisnall (90.23)
3 February – 13 June	Premier League	Mercedes-Benz Arena, Berlin, Germany	Michael van Gerwen (99.10)	11 – 10	Joe Cullen (99.36)
16–19 June	World Cup	Eissporthalle, Frankfurt, Germany	Australia (92.80) (Damon Heta and Simon Whitlock)	3 – 1	Wales (89.22) (Gerwyn Price and Jonny Clayton)
16–18 September	World Series Finals	AFAS Live, Amsterdam, Netherlands	Gerwyn Price (100.14)	11 – 10	Dirk van Duijvenbode (97.69)

=== World Series of Darts ===
The 2022 World Series of Darts was a series of televised darts tournaments organised by the PDC, consisting of seven events held across three continents.

Three new venues made their World Series debuts, with New York City replacing Las Vegas for the US Darts Masters, and two Australian events being moved to Wollongong and Townsville. A fourth new venue was added on 11 April, with the Dutch Darts Masters making its debut at the Ziggo Dome in Amsterdam, Netherlands.

No.	Date	Event	Venue	Champion	Legs	Runner-up
1	3–4 June	US Masters	Hulu Theater, New York City, United States	Michael Smith (99.14)	8 – 4	Michael van Gerwen (96.79)
2	10–11 June	Nordic Masters	Forum Copenhagen, Copenhagen, Denmark	Dimitri Van den Bergh (98.16)	11 – 5	Gary Anderson (93.78)
3	24–25 June	Dutch Masters	Ziggo Dome, Amsterdam, Netherlands	Dimitri Van den Bergh (104.60)	8 – 2	Dirk van Duijvenbode (94.01)
4	12–13 August	Queensland Masters	Townsville Entertainment and Convention Centre, Townsville, Australia	Michael van Gerwen (99.87)	8 – 5	Gerwyn Price (89.17)
5	19–20 August	New South Wales Masters	Wollongong Entertainment Centre, Wollongong, Australia	Jonny Clayton (94.50)	8 – 1	James Wade (84.93)
6	26–27 August	New Zealand Masters	Globox Arena, Hamilton, New Zealand	Gerwyn Price (93.15)	8 – 4	Jonny Clayton (96.31)

== Pro Tour ==
The 2022 PDC Pro Tour was a series of darts tournaments organised by the PDC, made up of 30 Players Championship events and 13 European Tour events.

=== Tour cards ===
The 2022 PDC Tour Cards were awarded to:

- (64) The top 64 players from the PDC Order of Merit after the 2022 World Championship.
  - Kirk Shepherd and Robert Marijanović resigned their tour cards despite having a year left on them, meaning an extra two cards were up for grabs at Q-School
- (2) Two highest qualifiers from the 2020 Challenge Tour (Ritchie Edhouse and David Evans).
- (1) Highest qualifier from the 2021 UK Challenge Tour (Jim Williams)
- (1) Highest qualifier from the 2021 EU Challenge Tour (Matt Campbell)
- (1) Highest qualifier from the 2021 UK Development Tour (Bradley Brooks)
- (1) Highest qualifier from the 2021 EU Development Tour (Rusty-Jake Rodriguez)
- (1) Highest qualifier from the 2020 Development Tour (Berry van Peer)
- (24) 24 qualifiers from 2021 Q-School not ranked in the top 64 in the PDC Order of Merit following the World Championship.

Afterwards, the playing field was complemented by the highest qualified players from the Q-School Order of Merit until the maximum number of 128 Pro Tour Card players was reached.

=== Q-School ===
The players below won their PDC Tour Cards through Q-School.

==== UK Automatic Tour Card winners ====
- James Wilson (ENG)
- Darren Webster (ENG)
- Ross Montgomery (SCO)
- Josh Rock (NIR)

==== EU Automatic Tour Card winners ====
- José Justicia (ESP)
- Brian Raman (BEL)
- Luc Peters (NED)
- Krzysztof Kciuk (POL)

==== UK PDC Q-School Order of Merit ====
- Jamie Clark (SCO)
- Ted Evetts (ENG)
- Connor Scutt (ENG)
- Richie Burnett (WAL)
- Kevin Burness (NIR)
- Scott Waites (ENG)
- Nathan Rafferty (NIR)
- Cameron Menzies (SCO)
- John O'Shea (IRL)
- George Killington (ENG)
- Mickey Mansell (NIR)
- Nick Fullwell (ENG)
- Shaun Wilkinson (ENG)

=== EU Q-School Order of Merit ===
- Mario Vandenbogaerde (BEL)
- Jules van Dongen (USA)
- Kevin Doets (NED)
- Tony Martinez (ESP)
- Danny Jansen (NED)
- Radek Szagański (POL)
- Damian Mol (NED)
- Jimmy Hendriks (NED)
- Ricardo Pietreczko (GER)
- Vladimir Andersen (DEN)
- Rowby-John Rodriguez (AUT)

== Secondary Tours ==
The 2022 PDC Secondary Tours were series of darts tournaments organised by the PDC predominantly participated in by players without a Tour Card. There were three secondary tours – the Challenge Tour (for players who unsuccessfully participated in the 2022 Q-School), Development Tour (for players aged 16–24) and Women's Series (for female players). All three offered qualification to the 2022 Grand Slam of Darts and 2023 World Championship, while the Challenge and Development Tours offered 2023–24 PDC Tour Cards.

== PDC Nordic & Baltic Tour ==
On 26 November 2021, the PDCNB unveiled their 2022 calendar, which is set to include 5 weekends, incorporating 2 weekends in Denmark, and one weekend each in Sweden, Finland and Latvia, although the Sweden weekend will be purely held for European Tour qualifiers. The top two players on the Order of merit qualify for the 2023 PDC World Darts Championship.

Final PDCNB Order of Merit
Rank	Player	Points
1	Darius Labanauskas	6825
2	Daniel Larsson	4425
3	Vladimir Andersen	3575
4	Madars Razma	3125
5	Marko Kantele	2650
6	Dennis Nilsson	2500
7	Andreas Harrysson	2200
8	Benjamin Drue Reus	1675
9	Andreas Toft Jørgensen	1150
10	Veijo Viinikka	1100

No.	Date	Venue	Winner	Legs	Runner-up	Ref.
1	Saturday 29 January	Slangerup Dart Club, Slangerup	Vladimir Andersen (86.93)	6 – 5	Daniel Larsson (87.75)	
2	Sunday 30 January	Slangerup Dart Club, Slangerup	Madars Razma (87.21)	6 – 4	Darius Labanauskas (87.40)	
3	Saturday 4 June	Hotelli Tallukka, Vääksy	Darius Labanauskas (85.30)	6 – 3	Marko Kantele (77.10)	
4	Sunday 5 June	Hotelli Tallukka, Vääksy	Dennis Nilsson (82.10)	6 – 1	Madars Razma (79.72)	
5	Saturday 30 July	Slangerup Dart Club, Slangerup	Andreas Harrysson (92.04)	6 – 3	Darius Labanauskas (87.35)	
6	Sunday 31 July	Slangerup Dart Club, Slangerup	Daniel Larsson (84.05)	6 – 4	Vladimir Andersen (77.12)	
7	Friday 12 August	Bellevue Park Hotel, Riga	Darius Labanauskas (94.82)	6 – 2	Veijo Viinikka (82.88)	
8	Saturday 13 August	Bellevue Park Hotel, Riga	Darius Labanauskas (83.41)	6 – 4	Daniel Larsson (84.60)	
9	Saturday 13 August	Bellevue Park Hotel, Riga	Darius Labanauskas (90.45)	6 – 1	Vladimir Andersen (81.83)	
10	Sunday 14 August	Bellevue Park Hotel, Riga	Marko Kantele (88.73)	6 – 4	Daniel Larsson (88.68)	

== Dartplayers Australia Pro Tour ==
The Dartplayers Australia Tour was modified once again to reduce the amount of travel required within the context of the global pandemic. The original format was that every event would consist of five state round robin rounds. After which an online 32 player knockout round would be played. After the first event there were technical difficulties with the online knockout round. It was then decided that every state event would be played out with separate knockout stages. With the top 16 from every state after all 15 events qualifying for the Australasian Championships.

=== Online Knockout Event ===
No.	Date	Winner	Legs	Runner-up	Ref.
1	Friday 11 February	(85.38) Tim Pusey	6 – 3	David Littleboy (73.88)	

=== New South Wales ===
No.	Date	Venue	Winner	Legs	Runner-up	Ref.
2	Saturday 12 February	Warilla Bowls Club, Barrack Heights	(69.83) Jake Buckley	5 – 4	Daniel Pearson (66.95)	
3	Sunday 13 February	Warilla Bowls Club, Barrack Heights	(67.69) Mark Taafe	6 – 3	David Cairns (67.12)	
4	Friday 11 March	Warilla Bowls Club, Barrack Heights	(90.53) Dave Hanel	6 – 2	Pat Molloy (79.92)	
5	Saturday 12 March	Warilla Bowls Club, Barrack Heights	(80.64) Jamie Browne	6 – 3	Dave Hanel (72.43)	
6	Sunday 13 March	Warilla Bowls Club, Barrack Heights	(69.49) Mitchell Clegg	6 – 5	David Cairns (68.77)	
7	Friday 8 April	Warilla Bowls Club, Barrack Heights	(83.34) Dave Marland	6 – 5	Mark Taafe (78.34)	
8	Saturday 9 April	Warilla Bowls Club, Barrack Heights	(79.46) Mitchell Clegg	6 – 4	Dave Hanel (81.12)	
9	Sunday 10 April	Warilla Bowls Club, Barrack Heights	(73.57) Dave Marland	6 – 3	Mark Taafe (69.17)	
10	Friday 13 May	Warilla Bowls Club, Barrack Heights	(81.98) Dave Hanel	6 – 5	Jamie Browne (80.36)	
11	Saturday 14 May	Warilla Bowls Club, Barrack Heights	(83.98) Dave Marland	6 – 4	Daniel Pearson (76.52)	
12	Sunday 15 May	Warilla Bowls Club, Barrack Heights	(78.32) Dave Marland	6 – 5	Dave Hanel (78.14)	
13	Friday 10 June	Warilla Bowls Club, Barrack Heights	(82.73) Dave Marland	6 – 0	Dave Hanel (69.72)	
14	Saturday 11 June	Warilla Bowls Club, Barrack Heights	(76.31) Matt Liddall	6 – 3	Andrew Eagers (66.14)	
15	Sunday 12 June	Warilla Bowls Club, Barrack Heights	(77.83) Dave Hanel	6 – 2	David Cairns (76.45)	

=== Queensland ===
No.	Date	Venue	Winner	Legs	Runner-up	Ref.
2	Saturday 12 February	Surfers Paradise Golf Club, Clear Island Waters	(84.64) Raymond O'Donnell	6 – 4	Robbie King (76.91)	
3	Sunday 13 February	Surfers Paradise Golf Club, Clear Island Waters	(92.44) Raymond Smith	6 – 4	Robbie King (82.88)	
4	Friday 11 March	Surfers Paradise Golf Club, Clear Island Waters	(91.09) Raymond Smith	6 – 2	Robbie King (89.15)	
5	Saturday 12 March	Surfers Paradise Golf Club, Clear Island Waters	(86.76) Raymond Smith	6 – 3	Jeremy Fagg (81.97)	
6	Sunday 13 March	Surfers Paradise Golf Club, Clear Island Waters	(96.92) Raymond Smith	6 – 2	Robbie King (92.04)	
7	Friday 8 April	North Lakes Community Centre, North Lakes	Cancelled			
8	Saturday 9 April	North Lakes Community Centre, North Lakes	Cancelled			
9	Sunday 10 April	North Lakes Community Centre, North Lakes	Cancelled			
10	Friday 13 May	North Lakes Community Centre, North Lakes	(89.36) Robbie King	6 – 2	James Bailey (78.05)	
11	Saturday 14 May	North Lakes Community Centre, North Lakes	(75.93) Peter Willmott	6 – 5	Robbie King (77.01)	
12	Sunday 15 May	North Lakes Community Centre, North Lakes	(88.59) Robbie King	6 – 2	James Bailey (78.84)	
13	Friday 24 June	Surfers Paradise Golf Club, Clear Island Waters	(83.94) Peter Willmott	6 – 3	Matthew McLennan (78.04)	
14	Saturday 25 June	Surfers Paradise Golf Club, Clear Island Waters	(83.05) Bill Aitken	6 – 3	Matthew McLennan (81.77)	
15	Sunday 26 June	Surfers Paradise Golf Club, Clear Island Waters	(83.04) Bill Aitken	6 – 3	Matthew McLennan (76.90)	

=== Western Australia ===
No.	Date	Venue	Winner	Legs	Runner-up	Ref.
2	Saturday 12 February	Port Kennedy Tavern, Port Kennedy	(89.70) Tim Pusey	6 – 2	Justin Miles (83.48)	
3	Sunday 13 February	Port Kennedy Tavern, Port Kennedy	(69.19) Bailey Marsh	6 – 2	Dave Burke (71.19)	
4	Friday 11 March	Port Kennedy Tavern, Port Kennedy	(89.53) Bailey Marsh	6 – 5	Joe Comito (81.10)	
5	Saturday 12 March	Port Kennedy Tavern, Port Kennedy	(88.70) David Platt	6 – 2	Tim Pusey (83.18)	
6	Sunday 13 March	Port Kennedy Tavern, Port Kennedy	(82.44) Bailey Marsh	6 – 3	Brenton Lloyd (80.54)	
7	Friday 8 April	Port Kennedy Tavern, Port Kennedy	(78.50) Justin Miles	6 – 5	David Platt (76.79)	
8	Saturday 9 April	Port Kennedy Tavern, Port Kennedy	(91.52) David Platt	6 – 2	Howard Jones (84.32)	
9	Sunday 10 April	Port Kennedy Tavern, Port Kennedy	(79.72) Justin Miles	6 – 4	Bailey Marsh (83.59)	
10	Friday 13 May	Port Kennedy Tavern, Port Kennedy	(100.24) Justin Miles	6 – 1	David Platt (90.09)	
11	Saturday 14 May	Port Kennedy Tavern, Port Kennedy	(92.23) Howard Jones	6 – 3	Tim Pusey (86.36)	
12	Sunday 15 May	Port Kennedy Tavern, Port Kennedy	(85.71) Justin Miles	6 – 2	Joe Comito (82.40)	
13	Friday 10 June	Port Kennedy Tavern, Port Kennedy	(77.06) Koha Kokiri	6 – 4	Dave Burke (74.51)	
14	Saturday 11 June	Port Kennedy Tavern, Port Kennedy	(73.23) Blake Hatchett	6 – 5	Brenton Lloyd (71.27)	
15	Sunday 12 June	Port Kennedy Tavern, Port Kennedy	(72.38) Howard Jones	6 – 5	Bailey Marsh (73.00)	

=== South Australia ===
Notably in the South Australian events, Kym Mitchell became the first female winner of a DPA event in the 20-year history of the organisation.

No.	Date	Venue	Winner	Legs	Runner-up	Ref.
2	Saturday 12 February	Northern Districts Darts Association, Elizabeth North	(77.84) Danny Porter	6 – 5	Scott Hallett (77.18)	
3	Sunday 13 February	Northern Districts Darts Association, Elizabeth North	(79.66) Danny Porter	6 – 4	Adam Leek (74.66)	
4	Friday 11 March	Northern Districts Darts Association, Elizabeth North	(66.94) Danny Porter	6 – 3	Adam Leek (66.75)	
5	Saturday 12 March	Northern Districts Darts Association, Elizabeth North	(86.01) Rob Modra	6 – 4	Danny Porter (84.43)	
6	Sunday 13 March	Northern Districts Darts Association, Elizabeth North	(70.31) Kevin Young	6 – 5	Danny Porter (71.47)	
7	Friday 8 April	Northern Districts Darts Association, Elizabeth North	(85.28) Rob Modra	6 – 3	Danny Porter (83.13)	
8	Saturday 9 April	Northern Districts Darts Association, Elizabeth North	(69.77) Danny Porter	6 – 1	Jed Nethercott (64.41)	
9	Sunday 10 April	Northern Districts Darts Association, Elizabeth North	(87.40) Danny Porter	6 – 1	Rob Modra (76.23)	
10	Friday 13 May	Northern Districts Darts Association, Elizabeth North	(80.79) Danny Porter	6 – 1	Adam Leek (68.36)	
11	Saturday 14 May	Northern Districts Darts Association, Elizabeth North	(80.79) Danny Porter	6 – 3	Brett Selga (73.24)	
12	Sunday 15 May	Northern Districts Darts Association, Elizabeth North	(71.95) Danny Porter	6 – 3	Phillip Rowland (70.91)	
13	Friday 10 June	Northern Districts Darts Association, Elizabeth North	(81.12) Danny Porter	6 – 4	Rob Modra (76.55)	
14	Saturday 11 June	Northern Districts Darts Association, Elizabeth North	(81.43) Kym Mitchell	6 – 5	Danny Porter (79.90)	
15	Sunday 12 June	Northern Districts Darts Association, Elizabeth North	(84.75) Danny Porter	6 – 1	Kym Mitchell (70.98)	

=== Victoria ===
No.	Date	Venue	Winner	Legs	Runner-up	Ref.
2	Saturday 12 February	Australian Italian Club, Morwell	(85.46) Mal Cuming	5 – 2	Brody Klinge (83.48)	
3	Sunday 13 February	Australian Italian Club, Morwell	(84.30) Mal Cuming	6 – 3	Brody Klinge (77.59)	
4	Friday 11 March	Melton Dart Club, Melton	(81.09) Brandon Weening	6 – 1	Barry Leddington (74.07)	
5	Saturday 12 March	Melton Dart Club, Melton	(81.60) Brandon Weening	6 – 4	Justin Thompson (79.29)	
6	Sunday 13 March	Melton Dart Club, Melton	(87.45) Mal Cuming	6 – 2	Justin Thompson (89.05)	
7	Friday 8 April	Australian Italian Club, Morwell	(84.95) Brandon Weening	6 – 4	Mal Cuming (81.45)	
8	Saturday 9 April	Australian Italian Club, Morwell	(87.20) Stuart Coburn	6 – 4	Brandon Weening (83.87)	
9	Sunday 10 April	Australian Italian Club, Morwell	(86.81) Mal Cuming	6 – 3	Brandon Weening (89.18)	
10	Friday 13 May	Melton Dart Club, Melton	(84.61) Brandon Weening	6 – 2	Mal Cuming (77.76)	
11	Saturday 14 May	Melton Dart Club, Melton	(88.63) Brandon Weening	6 – 3	Mal Cuming (85.95)	
12	Sunday 15 May	Melton Dart Club, Melton	(88.16) Mal Cuming	6 – 1	Stuart Coburn (79.51)	
13	Friday 10 June	Geelong Darts Club, Corio	(82.88) Brandon Weening	6 – 3	Stuart Coburn (81.62)	
14	Saturday 11 June	Geelong Darts Club, Corio	(82.67) Brandon Weening	6 – 4	Stuart Coburn (81.40)	
15	Sunday 12 June	Geelong Darts Club, Corio	(87.66) Stuart Coburn	6 – 4	Brandon Weening (83.84)	

=== DPA ProTour Playoff ===
On 17 July, the DPA hosted the ProTour Playoff.The tournament was won by Raymond Smith, who qualified for the 2023 PDC World Darts Championship.

=== DPA Oceanic Masters ===
On 23 October, the DPA hosted the Oceanic Masters.The tournament was won by Mal Cuming, who qualified for the 2023 PDC World Darts Championship.

== Dartplayers New Zealand Pro Tour ==
The Dartplayers New Zealand Tour consisted of 8 events in 2022. They were held over 4 weekends.

No.	Date	Venue	Winner	Legs	Runner-up	Ref.
1	Saturday 11 June	Papakura Club, Auckland	Ben Robb	7 – 5	Haupai Puha	
2	Sunday 12 June	Papakura Club, Auckland	Warren Parry	7 – 5	Ben Robb	
3	Saturday 6 August	Black Horse Hotel, Christchurch	Ben Robb	7 – 5	Mark Cleaver	
4	Sunday 7 August	Black Horse Hotel, Christchurch	Ben Robb	7 – 2	Warren Parry	
5	Saturday 24 September	Birkenhead RSA, Auckland	(85.36) Mark Cleaver	7 – 3	John Hurring (81.27)	
6	Sunday 25 September	Birkenhead RSA, Auckland	(91.74) Ben Robb	7 – 5	Haupai Puha (87.30)	
7	Saturday 15 October	Dunedin Metro Club, Dunedin	Haupai Puha	7 – 6	Kayden Milne	
8	Sunday 16 October	Dunedin Metro Club, Dunedin	Ben Robb	7 – 1	Haupai Puha	

== EuroAsian Dart Corporation (EADC) Pro Tour ==
The EuroAsian Darts Corporation was due to host 6 events over 2 weekends, however the second weekend was cancelled due to the 2022 Russian invasion of Ukraine, and the EADC was suspended from hosting any darting events until further notice.

No.	Date	Venue	Winner	Legs	Runner-up	Ref.
1	Saturday 26 February	Maxima Zarya Hotel, Moscow	Aleksei Kadochnikov	6 – 3	Anton Kolesov	
2	Saturday 26 February	Maxima Zarya Hotel, Moscow	Dmitriy Sitkarev	6 – 5	Roman Obukhov	
3	Sunday 27 February	Maxima Zarya Hotel, Moscow	Boris Koltsov	6 – 1	Andrey Pontus	
4	Saturday 23 April	Maxima Zarya Hotel, Moscow	Cancelled			
5	Saturday 23 April	Maxima Zarya Hotel, Moscow	Cancelled			
6	Sunday 24 April	Maxima Zarya Hotel, Moscow	Cancelled			
