= 2022 PDC Calendar =

2022 PDC Calendar may refer to:

- 2022 PDC Calendar (January–May)
- 2022 PDC Calendar (June–December)
