= 2022 Women's World Matchplay =

2022 Betfred Women's World Matchplay

Tournament information
- Dates: 24 July 2022
- Venue: Winter Gardens
- Location: Blackpool, England
- Organisation(s): Professional Darts Corporation (PDC)
- Format: Legs
- Prize fund: £25,000
- Winner's share: £10,000
- High checkout: 142 Fallon Sherrock (final)

Champion(s)
- Fallon Sherrock (ENG)

The 2022 Betfred Women's World Matchplay was the inaugural staging of the tournament by the Professional Darts Corporation. The tournament featured the top eight players on the 2022 PDC Women's Series Order of Merit, competing in a knockout format, with the winner earning a place in the 2022 Grand Slam of Darts and the 2023 PDC World Championship. The tournament was held at the Winter Gardens in Blackpool on 24 July 2022.

Fallon Sherrock won the title, defeating Aileen de Graaf 6–3 in the final.

== Format ==
The format was confirmed on 30 June 2022, with the tournament using a leg format. The quarter-finals are the best of 7 legs (or first to 4 legs), the semi-finals are the best of 9 legs (or first to 5 legs), and the final is the best of 11 legs (or first to 6 legs). Unlike the men's edition the matches didn't have to be won by two clear legs.

== Prize money ==
The total prize fund was £25,000. The winner of the tournament also got a spot in the 2022 Grand Slam of Darts. It was then later confirmed that the winner of this, and all future Women's World Matchplay tournaments will qualify for the PDC World Darts Championship.

Position (no. of players)		Prize money (Total: £25,000)
Winner	(1)	£10,000
Runner-up	(1)	£5,000
Semi-finalists	(2)	£2,500
Quarter-finalists	(4)	£1,250

== Qualifiers ==
The eight qualifiers for the tournament were the top 8 ranked players on the 2022 PDC Women's Series Order of Merit after the first 12 events.

The qualifiers were:

1. Lisa Ashton (semi-finals)
2. Fallon Sherrock (champion)
3. Lorraine Winstanley (semi-finals)
4. Aileen de Graaf (runner-up)
5. Laura Turner (quarter-finals)
6. Rhian Griffiths (quarter-finals)
7. Katie Sheldon (quarter-finals)
8. Chloe O'Brien (quarter-finals)

== Draw ==
Quarter-finals (best of 7 legs); 24 July
1	Lisa Ashton 67.55	4
8	Chloe O'Brien 61.17	0
4	Aileen de Graaf 80.63	4
5	Laura Turner 69.84	1
2	Fallon Sherrock 80.61	4
7	Katie Sheldon 73.78	2
3	Lorraine Winstanley 71.98	4
6	Rhian Griffiths 71.26	3

Semi-finals (best of 9 legs); 24 July
1	Lisa Ashton 72.15	4
4	Aileen de Graaf 73.43	5
2	Fallon Sherrock 81.65	5
3	Lorraine Winstanley 76.93	2

Final (best of 11 legs); 24 July
4	Aileen de Graaf 76.30	3
2	Fallon Sherrock 82.41	6
