= 2022 PDC Nordic & Baltic ProTour series =

Professional Darts Tournament

The 2022 PDC Nordic & Baltic ProTour consists of 10 darts tournaments on the 2022 PDC Pro Tour.

== Prize money ==
The prize money for the Nordic & Baltic ProTour events remained the same from 2021, with each event having a prize fund of €5,000.

This is how the prize money is divided:

Stage (no. of players)		Prize money (Total: €5,000)
Winner	(1)	€1,200
Runner-up	(1)	€600
Semi-finalists	(2)	€300
Quarter-finalists	(4)	€200
Last 16	(8)	€125
Last 32	(16)	€50

== January ==
=== Nordic & Baltic ProTour 1 ===
ProTour 1 was contested on Saturday 29 January 2022 at the Slangerup Dart Club in Slangerup, Denmark. The tournament was won by Vladimir Andersen.

Quarter-finals (best of 11 legs)
Vladimir Andersen 83.95	6
Matthias Örn Friðriksson 77.38	5
Allan Daugbjerg Olsen 72.22	4
Ricky Nauman 76.94	6
2	Daniel Larsson 88.43	6
Brian Løkken 87.66	4
3	Marko Kantele 89.11	3
Benjamin Drue Reus 86.38	6

Semi-finals (best of 11 legs)
Vladimir Andersen 93.48	6
Ricky Nauman 82.08	2
2	Daniel Larsson 84.72	6
Benjamin Drue Reus 79.57	1

Final (best of 11 legs)
Vladimir Andersen 86.93	6
2	Daniel Larsson 87.75	5

=== Nordic & Baltic ProTour 2 ===
ProTour 2 was contested on Sunday 30 January 2022 at the Slangerup Dart Club in Slangerup, Denmark. The tournament was won by Madars Razma.

Quarter-finals (best of 11 legs)
1	Vladimir Andersen 88.72	4
Darius Labanauskas 92.22	6
4	Benjamin Drue Reus 85.05	6
5	Matthias Örn Friðriksson 73.82	3
2	Daniel Larsson 92.02	6
Andreas Toft Jørgensen 79.23	0
3	Ricky Nauman 89.76	4
Madars Razma 90.39	6

Semi-finals (best of 11 legs)
Darius Labanauskas 97.50	6
4	Benjamin Drue Reus 92.70	3
2	Daniel Larsson 94.77	4
Madars Razma 94.01	6

Final (best of 11 legs)
Darius Labanauskas 87.40	4
Madars Razma 87.21	6

== June ==
=== Nordic & Baltic ProTour 3 ===
ProTour 3 was contested on Saturday 4 June 2022 at the Hotelli Tallukka, Vääksy, Finland. The tournament was won by Darius Labanauskas.

Quarter-finals (best of 11 legs)
Jani Keskinarkaus 73.79	6
Ulf Ceder 72.20	2
4	Darius Labanauskas 89.66	6
Nauris Gleglu 79.90	1
Marko Kantele 89.61	6
Hannu Suominen 85.73	4
3	Daniel Larsson 92.09	6
6	Johan Engström 79.87	2

Semi-finals (best of 11 legs)
Jani Keskinarkaus 65.42	1
4	Darius Labanauskas 79.52	6
Marko Kantele 90.23	6
3	Daniel Larsson 92.04	5

Final (best of 11 legs)
4	Darius Labanauskas 85.30	6
Marko Kantele 77.10	3

=== Nordic & Baltic ProTour 4 ===
ProTour 4 was contested on Sunday 5 June 2022 at the Hotelli Tallukka, Vääksy, Finland. The tournament was won by Dennis Nilsson.

Quarter-finals (best of 11 legs)
1	Darius Labanauskas 77.11	2
Dennis Nilsson 89.80	6
4	Daniel Larsson 72.98	1
Veijo Viinikka 79.85	6
Michael Ladefoged 74.30	3
7	Brian Løkken 79.32	6
3	Madars Razma 87.79	6
6	Benjamin Drue Reus 84.23	3

Semi-finals (best of 11 legs)
Dennis Nilsson 77.08	6
Veijo Viinikka 74.35	0
7	Brian Løkken 77.63	3
3	Madars Razma 79.30	6

Final (best of 11 legs)
Dennis Nilsson 82.10	6
3	Madars Razma 79.72	1

== July ==
=== Nordic & Baltic ProTour 5 ===
ProTour 5 was contested on Saturday 30 July 2022 at the Slangerup Dart Club in Slangerup, Denmark. The tournament was won by Andreas Harrysson.

Quarter-finals (best of 11 legs)
1	Darius Labanauskas 88.08	6
8	Brian Løkken 75.68	3
4	Daniel Larsson 85.04	6
5	Dennis Nilsson 87.07	5
2	Madars Razma 85.79	6
Ulrich Meyn 77.37	5
3	Vladimir Andersen 91.80	5
Andreas Harrysson 92.04	6

Semi-finals (best of 11 legs)
1	Darius Labanauskas 99.04	6
4	Daniel Larsson 99.29	5
2	Madars Razma 77.15	1
Andreas Harrysson 90.97	6

Final (best of 11 legs)
1	Darius Labanauskas 87.35	3
Andreas Harrysson 92.04	6

=== Nordic & Baltic ProTour 6 ===
ProTour 6 was contested on Sunday 31 July 2022 at the Slangerup Dart Club in Slangerup, Denmark. The tournament was won by Daniel Larsson.

Quarter-finals (best of 11 legs)
1	Darius Labanauskas 93.94	6
Patrick Heinsøe 82.87	0
4	Daniel Larsson 90.87	6
5	Dennis Nilsson 86.16	2
2	Madars Razma 87.78	6
Ulrich Meyn 75.41	1
3	Vladimir Andersen 82.22	6
Janis Mustafejevs 75.82	2

Semi-finals (best of 11 legs)
1	Darius Labanauskas 93.52	4
4	Daniel Larsson 93.36	6
2	Madars Razma 76.87	2
3	Vladimir Andersen 89.03	6

Final (best of 11 legs)
4	Daniel Larsson 84.05	6
3	Vladimir Andersen 77.12	4

== August ==
=== Nordic & Baltic ProTour 7 ===
ProTour 7 was contested on Friday 12 August 2022 at the Bellevue Park Hotel in Riga, Latvia. The tournament was won by Darius Labanauskas.

Quarter-finals (best of 11 legs)
1	Darius Labanauskas 83.64	6
Teuvo Haverinen 75.85	2
Jyri Ussa 84.22	6
5	Andreas Harrysson 85.55	3
Veijo Viinikka 85.76	6
Andreas Toft Jørgensen 83.95	4
3	Vladimir Andersen 66.30	0
Paavo Myller 79.11	6

Semi-finals (best of 11 legs)
1	Darius Labanauskas 84.19	6
Jyri Ussa 83.22	5
Veijo Viinikka 81.07	6
Paavo Myller 77.01	4

Final (best of 11 legs)
1	Darius Labanauskas 94.82	6
Veijo Viinikka 82.88	2

=== Nordic & Baltic ProTour 8 ===
ProTour 8 was contested on Saturday 13 August 2022 at the Bellevue Park Hotel in Riga, Latvia. It was won by Darius Labanauskas.

Quarter-finals (best of 11 legs)
1	Darius Labanauskas 84.46	6
Ivan Springborg Poulsen 72.30	1
4	Madars Razma 85.42	6
5	Dennis Nilsson 79.25	5
2	Daniel Larsson 84.99	6
7	Benjamin Drue Reus 80.86	3
Andreas Toft Jørgensen 88.50	4
6	Andreas Harrysson 89.79	6

Semi-finals (best of 11 legs)
1	Darius Labanauskas 83.80	6
4	Madars Razma 85.76	4
2	Daniel Larsson 87.40	6
6	Andreas Harrysson 83.48	1

Final (best of 11 legs)
1	Darius Labanauskas 83.41	6
2	Daniel Larsson 84.60	4

=== Nordic & Baltic ProTour 9 ===
ProTour 9 was contested on Saturday 13 August 2022 at the Bellevue Park Hotel in Riga, Latvia. It was won by Darius Labanauskas.

Quarter-finals (best of 11 legs)
1	Darius Labanauskas 94.44	6
Teemu Harju 82.64	3
Andreas Toft Jørgensen 83.50	3
5	Dennis Nilsson 85.94	6
2	Daniel Larsson	w/d
Jani Keskinarkaus	w/o
3	Vladimir Andersen 84.84	6
6	Andreas Harrysson 78.91	4

Semi-finals (best of 11 legs)
1	Darius Labanauskas 88.27	6
5	Dennis Nilsson 81.95	1
Jani Keskinarkaus 76.92	3
3	Vladimir Andersen 76.53	6

Final (best of 11 legs)
1	Darius Labanauskas 90.45	6
3	Vladimir Andersen 81.83	1

=== Nordic & Baltic ProTour 10 ===
ProTour 10 was contested on Sunday 14 August 2022 at the Bellevue Park Hotel in Riga, Latvia. It was won by Marko Kantele.

Quarter-finals (best of 11 legs)
1	Darius Labanauskas 83.17	0
8	Marko Kantele 98.02	6
Laimis Zubavicius 78.67	3
5	Dennis Nilsson 82.55	6
2	Daniel Larsson 97.49	6
Jani Elijoki 75.55	1
3	Vladimir Andersen 67.40	0
Johan Engström 84.28	6

Semi-finals (best of 11 legs)
8	Marko Kantele 91.09	6
5	Dennis Nilsson 76.06	0
2	Daniel Larsson 94.73	6
Johan Engström 86.66	2

Final (best of 11 legs)
8	Marko Kantele 88.73	6
2	Daniel Larsson 88.68	2
