= Chloe O'Brien (darts player) =

Scottish darts player

Personal information
- Full name: Chloe O'Brien
- Nickname: "Mini COB"
- Born: 28 April 2002 (age 24) Blairgowrie and Rattray, Perthshire, Scotland
- Home town: Perthshire, Scotland

Sport
- Sport: Darts
- Playing since: 2016
- Laterality: Right-handed

Organisation (see split in darts)
- BDO: 2017–2020
- PDC: 2022–
- WDF: 2017–
Medal record
Women's Darts
Representing Scotland
WDF World Cup
| Silver medal – second place | 2019 Cluj | Girls pairs |
| Bronze medal – third place | 2019 Cluj | Mixed pairs |
| Bronze medal – third place | 2019 Cluj | Youth's overall |

Chloe O'Brien (born 28 April 2002) is a Scottish professional darts player who plays in Professional Darts Corporation (PDC) and World Darts Federation (WDF) events. Her biggest achievement to date was qualifying for the inaugural 2022 Women's World Matchplay.

== Career ==
O'Brien started her career in numerous youth's tournaments, both locally and internationally. The first successes came relatively quickly, she became a series winner at least in her region. In 2019, she was selected by the national federation to participate in the 2019 WDF World Cup in youth's competitions. In singles competition she advanced to second phase, but lost to Ksenia Klochek in the second round match. In the pairs competition, together with Sophie McKinlay, she won the silver medal, lost in the final to Beau Greaves and Shannon Reeves from England. In mixed pairs competition, she won a bronze medal, played together with Nathan Girvan. Ultimately, Scotland also won a bronze medal in the overall youth ranking. O'Brien also participated in the 2019 World Masters for girls, but she lost to Wibke Riemann by 1–4 in legs, in the quarter-finals match.

In 2020, she performed at the 2020 Dutch Open. In the senior competition, she advanced to the sixth round, where she lost to Lorraine Winstanley by 1–3 in legs. In the youth's competition, she advanced to the semi-finals, but lost to Layla Brussel by 2–3 in legs. Her career was cut short by the coronavirus pandemic. In 2021, she participated only in two World Darts Federation tournaments, but lost in the first phases. She returned to regular competition in the 2022, participated in the 2022 PDC Women's Series. O'Brien twice made it to the semi-finals, but there were also many first-round defeats. Overall, her good results in few tournaments allowed her to qualify for the inaugural 2022 Women's World Matchplay. In the quarter-finals she faced Lisa Ashton and lost to her by 0–4 in legs.

At the end of September 2022, she was selected by the national federation to participate in the 2022 WDF Europe Cup. On the second day of the tournament, she advanced to the second round of the singles competition, where she lost to Vicky Pruim by 1–4 in legs. In the pairs and team competition, she did not achieve satisfactory results. Along with qualifying for 2022 Women's World Matchplay, she was invited to participate in the 2022 PDC World Youth Championship. In the group stage she faced Josh Rock and Lee Lok Yin. She lost both games and was eliminated from the tournament.

== Performance timeline ==
| Tournament | 2020 | 2021 | 2022 |
|---|---|---|---|
PDC Non-ranked televised events
| Women's World Matchplay | NH | | QF |
| World Youth Championship | DNQ | | RR |
WDF Ranked televised events
| Dutch Open | 6R | NH | DNP |
Career statistics
| Year-end ranking (PDC) | – | – | |
