= 2022 PDC Women's Series =

Series of darts tournaments

The 2022 PDC Women's Series consisted of 20 darts tournaments on the 2022 PDC Pro Tour.

== Prize money ==
The prize money for the Women's Series events remained the same from 2021, with each event having a prize fund of £5,000.

This is how the prize money is divided:

Stage (no. of players)		Prize money (Total: £5,000)
Winner	(1)	£1,000
Runner-up	(1)	£600
Semi-finalists	(2)	£400
Quarter-finalists	(4)	£250
Last 16	(8)	£100
Last 32	(16)	£50

== March ==
=== Women's Series 1 ===
Women's Series 1 was contested on Saturday 12 March 2022 at the Barnsley Metrodome in Barnsley. The tournament was won by Lisa Ashton.

Quarter-finals (best of 7 legs)
Rhian Griffiths 76.10	4
Tracy North 72.92	0
Juliet Findley 63.05	2
Chloe O'Brien 73.87	4
Aileen de Graaf 80.65	2
Lisa Ashton 92.19	4
Fallon Sherrock 78.45	3
Lorraine Winstanley 75.38	4

Semi-finals (best of 9 legs)
Rhian Griffiths 74.93	5
Chloe O'Brien 70.49	2
Lisa Ashton 88.50	5
Lorraine Winstanley 72.15	1

Final (best of 9 legs)
Rhian Griffiths 76.50	2
Lisa Ashton 78.14	5

=== Women's Series 2 ===
Women's Series 2 was contested on Saturday 12 March 2022 at the Barnsley Metrodome in Barnsley. The tournament was won by Lisa Ashton.

Quarter-finals (best of 7 legs)
Jane Densley 77.45	2
Robyn Byrne 77.22	4
Chloe O'Brien 70.94	2
Maria O'Brien 78.62	4
Steph Clarke 61.66	2
Lisa Ashton 76.67	4
Fallon Sherrock 80.29	4
Lorraine Winstanley 79.00	2

Semi-finals (best of 9 legs)
Robyn Byrne 76.86	5
Maria O'Brien 69.16	4
Lisa Ashton 81.04	5
Fallon Sherrock 84.26	4

Final (best of 9 legs)
Robyn Byrne 74.72	3
Lisa Ashton 80.14	5

=== Women's Series 3 ===
Women's Series 3 was contested on Sunday 13 March 2022 at the Barnsley Metrodome in Barnsley. The tournament was won by Fallon Sherrock.

Quarter-finals (best of 7 legs)
Lerena Rietbergen 67.60	0
Aileen de Graaf 80.16	4
Fallon Sherrock 78.08	4
Natalie Gilbert 72.00	0
Rhian Griffiths 72.56	4
Roz Bulmer 64.47	1
Laura Turner 66.81	1
Jo Locke 72.97	4

Semi-finals (best of 9 legs)
Aileen de Graaf 82.88	1
Fallon Sherrock 89.94	5
Rhian Griffiths 67.89	1
Jo Locke 79.30	5

Final (best of 9 legs)
Fallon Sherrock 85.64	5
Jo Locke 80.47	3

=== Women's Series 4 ===
Women's Series 4 was contested on Sunday 13 March 2022 at the Barnsley Metrodome in Barnsley. The tournament was won by Lisa Ashton.

Quarter-finals (best of 7 legs)
Rhian O'Sullivan 66.38	0
Fallon Sherrock 88.41	4
Jane Densley 66.78	0
Lorraine Winstanley 82.36	4
Aileen de Graaf 77.04	2
Lisa Ashton 83.89	4
Kirsty Hutchinson 77.86	4
Trina Gulliver 75.38	3

Semi-finals (best of 9 legs)
Fallon Sherrock 85.83	5
Lorraine Winstanley 79.15	2
Lisa Ashton 95.79	5
Kirsty Hutchinson 91.04	3

Final (best of 9 legs)
Fallon Sherrock 94.41	4
Lisa Ashton 91.25	5

== April ==
=== Women's Series 5 ===
Women's Series 5 was contested on Saturday 30 April 2022 at the Robin Park Sports Centre in Wigan. The tournament was won by Trina Gulliver.

Quarter-finals (best of 7 legs)
Rhian O'Sullivan 65.78	1
Trina Gulliver 67.32	4
Lorraine Winstanley 70.28	3
Jane Densley 71.98	4
Fallon Sherrock 85.14	4
Mikuru Suzuki 77.16	1
Laura Turner 81.08	4
Kirsty Hutchinson 74.75	3

Semi-finals (best of 9 legs)
Trina Gulliver 69.02	5
Jane Densley 65.22	2
Fallon Sherrock 84.26	1
Laura Turner 79.74	5

Final (best of 9 legs)
Trina Gulliver 80.81	5
Laura Turner 74.51	1

=== Women's Series 6 ===
Women's Series 6 was contested on Saturday 30 April 2022 at the Robin Park Sports Centre in Wigan. The tournament was won by Lisa Ashton.

Quarter-finals (best of 7 legs)
Samantha Kirton 65.64	3
Laura Turner 72.85	4
Chloe O'Brien 68.71	4
Sarah Roberts 68.67	3
Michelle Andrews 66.26	0
Robyn Byrne 84.68	4
Lisa Ashton 91.16	4
Mikuru Suzuki 86.16	3

Semi-finals (best of 9 legs)
Laura Turner 70.47	5
Chloe O'Brien 68.49	3
Robyn Byrne 69.41	1
Lisa Ashton 82.54	5

Final (best of 9 legs)
Laura Turner 70.26	2
Lisa Ashton 75.98	5

== May ==
=== Women's Series 7 ===
Women's Series 7 was contested on Sunday 1 May 2022 at the Robin Park Sports Centre in Wigan. The tournament was won by Fallon Sherrock.

Quarter-finals (best of 7 legs)
Jane Densley 79.64	4
Vicky Pruim 75.56	2
Rhian Griffiths 64.27	2
Fallon Sherrock 76.05	4
Lisa Ashton 96.66	4
Laura Turner 80.72	1
Astrid Trouwborst 69.19	0
Mikuru Suzuki 76.10	4

Semi-finals (best of 9 legs)
Jane Densley 77.39	3
Fallon Sherrock 87.91	5
Lisa Ashton 82.17	5
Mikuru Suzuki 77.66	1

Final (best of 9 legs)
Fallon Sherrock 85.69	5
Lisa Ashton 81.92	1

=== Women's Series 8 ===
Women's Series 8 was contested on Sunday 1 May 2022 at the Robin Park Sports Centre in Wigan. The tournament was won by Lisa Ashton.

Quarter-finals (best of 7 legs)
Lorraine Winstanley 77.44	4
Aileen de Graaf 72.13	3
Rhian O'Sullivan 78.56	1
Lisa Ashton 84.73	4
Katie Sheldon 67.18	4
Corrine Hammond 66.91	2
Fallon Sherrock 77.08	4
Vicky Pruim 70.31	0

Semi-finals (best of 9 legs)
Lorraine Winstanley 78.51	4
Lisa Ashton 78.24	5
Katie Sheldon 80.17	5
Fallon Sherrock 86.71	4

Final (best of 9 legs)
Lisa Ashton 79.05	5
Katie Sheldon 74.58	2

== June ==
=== Women's Series 9 ===
Women's Series 9 was contested on Saturday 25 June 2022 at the Barnsley Metrodome in Barnsley. The tournament was won by Lisa Ashton.

Quarter-finals (best of 7 legs)
Jo Locke 75.00	2
Lorraine Winstanley 76.54	4
Aileen de Graaf 93.89	4
Fallon Sherrock 88.24	2
Lerena Rietbergen 72.51	1
Katie Sheldon 84.35	4
Corrine Hammond 80.24	3
Lisa Ashton 87.36	4

Semi-finals (best of 9 legs)
Lorraine Winstanley 66.87	1
Aileen de Graaf 78.91	5
Katie Sheldon 81.92	4
Lisa Ashton 84.18	5

Final (best of 9 legs)
Aileen de Graaf 81.69	1
Lisa Ashton 79.07	5

=== Women's Series 10 ===
Women's Series 10 was contested on Saturday 25 June 2022 at the Barnsley Metrodome in Barnsley. The tournament was won by Lorraine Winstanley.

Quarter-finals (best of 7 legs)
Deta Hedman 75.84	3
Rhian O'Sullivan 78.47	4
Laura Turner 67.95	1
Aileen de Graaf 77.03	4
Rhian Griffiths 71.67	4
Evonne Taylor 63.04	4
Tina Neylon 57.09	1
Lorraine Winstanley 70.77	4

Semi-finals (best of 9 legs)
Rhian O'Sullivan 78.28	5
Aileen de Graaf 75.69	4
Rhian Griffiths 73.59	4
Lorraine Winstanley 79.20	5

Final (best of 9 legs)
Rhian O'Sullivan 74.12	4
Lorraine Winstanley 71.83	5

=== Women's Series 11 ===
Women's Series 11 was contested on Sunday 26 June 2022 at the Barnsley Metrodome in Barnsley. The tournament was won by Fallon Sherrock.

Quarter-finals (best of 7 legs)
Natalie Gilbert 68.77	4
Lorraine Winstanley 68.79	3
Laura Turner 69.09	1
Lisa Ashton 78.98	4
Aileen de Graaf 80.31	4
Corrine Hammond 76.23	1
Fallon Sherrock 89.32	4
Kirsty Hutchinson 72.77	2

Semi-finals (best of 9 legs)
Natalie Gilbert 78.56	5
Lisa Ashton 85.65	4
Aileen de Graaf 87.84	2
Fallon Sherrock 102.62	5

Final (best of 9 legs)
Natalie Gilbert 76.76	3
Fallon Sherrock 85.70	5

=== Women's Series 12 ===
Women's Series 12 was contested on Sunday 26 June 2022 at the Barnsley Metrodome in Barnsley. The tournament was won by Lisa Ashton.

Quarter-finals (best of 7 legs)
Corrine Hammond 81.08	3
Fallon Sherrock 80.85	4
Denise Cassidy 67.88	2
Aileen de Graaf 73.03	4
Chloe O'Brien 71.52	0
Lisa Ashton 85.89	4
Maria O'Brien 59.48	1
Katie Sheldon 74.11	4

Semi-finals (best of 9 legs)
Fallon Sherrock 87.42	4
Aileen de Graaf 83.72	5
Lisa Ashton 74.96	5
Katie Sheldon 73.37	4

Final (best of 9 legs)
Aileen de Graaf 83.07	2
Lisa Ashton 85.36	5

== August ==
=== Women's Series 13 ===
Women's Series 13 was contested on Saturday 27 August 2022 at the Halle 39 in Hildesheim. The tournament was won by Beau Greaves.

Quarter-finals (best of 7 legs)
Katie Sheldon 80.03	4
Priscilla Steenbergen 74.27	1
Mikuru Suzuki 83.00	4
Aileen de Graaf 83.85	3
Iselin Hauen 61.86	4
Rhian Griffiths 68.71	2
Beau Greaves 92.47	4
Noa-Lynn van Leuven 83.54	2

Semi-finals (best of 9 legs)
Katie Sheldon 75.59	2
Mikuru Suzuki 75.76	5
Iselin Hauen 59.31	1
Beau Greaves 71.00	5

Final (best of 9 legs)
Mikuru Suzuki 77.91	1
Beau Greaves 84.98	5

=== Women's Series 14 ===
Women's Series 14 was contested on Saturday 27 August 2022 at the Halle 39 in Hildesheim. The tournament was won by Beau Greaves.

Quarter-finals (best of 7 legs)
Laura Turner 81.35	4
Noa-Lynn van Leuven 71.73	3
Beau Greaves 93.63	4
Stefanie Rennoch 71.92	3
Mikuru Suzuki 75.74	4
Priscilla Steenbergen 71.71	3
Lisa Ashton 77.17	4
Yukie Sakaguchi 80.53	2

Semi-finals (best of 9 legs)
Laura Turner 81.46	2
Beau Greaves 86.66	5
Mikuru Suzuki 81.10	5
Lisa Ashton 83.01	4

Final (best of 9 legs)
Beau Greaves 94.21	5
Mikuru Suzuki 88.64	2

=== Women's Series 15 ===
Women's Series 15 was contested on Sunday 28 August 2022 at the Halle 39 in Hildesheim. The tournament was won by Beau Greaves.

Quarter-finals (best of 7 legs)
Lerena Rietbergen 67.83	2
Deta Hedman 84.35	4
Priscilla Steenbergen 70.32	2
Beau Greaves 80.38	4
Lisa Ashton 78.76	3
Mikuru Suzuki 75.05	4
Yukie Sakaguchi 67.04	3
Anca Zijlstra 67.67	4

Semi-finals (best of 9 legs)
Deta Hedman 82.79	2
Beau Greaves 89.64	5
Mikuru Suzuki 86.38	5
Anca Zijlstra 66.71	0

Final (best of 9 legs)
Beau Greaves 95.47	5
Mikuru Suzuki 92.22	3

=== Women's Series 16 ===
Women's Series 16 was contested on Sunday 28 August 2022 at the Halle 39 in Hildesheim. The tournament was won by Beau Greaves, who completed a clean sweep of the 4 events held that weekend.

Quarter-finals (best of 7 legs)
Jitka Císařová 68.45	2
Stefanie Rennoch 68.08	4
Aileen de Graaf 84.07	4
Astrid Trouwborst 59.76	1
Rhian Griffiths 65.51	1
Beau Greaves 72.90	4
Yukie Sakaguchi 70.91	1
Katie Sheldon 79.53	4

Semi-finals (best of 9 legs)
Stefanie Rennoch 77.06	1
Aileen de Graaf 87.81	5
Beau Greaves 76.98	5
Katie Sheldon 73.56	2

Final (best of 9 legs)
Aileen de Graaf 75.91	3
Beau Greaves 82.99	5

== October ==
=== Women's Series 17 ===
Women's Series 17 was contested on Saturday 29 October 2022 at the Robin Park Sports Centre in Wigan. The tournament was won by Beau Greaves.

Quarter-finals (best of 7 legs)
Katie Sheldon 72.90	1
Mikuru Suzuki 79.44	4
Mandy Smith 63.00	2
Maria O'Brien 73.18	4
Lorraine Winstanley 73.44	4
Deta Hedman 77.77	1
Aileen de Graaf 78.45	2
Beau Greaves 80.67	4

Semi-finals (best of 9 legs)
Mikuru Suzuki 68.27	5
Maria O'Brien 58.65	1
Lorraine Winstanley 83.16	2
Beau Greaves 98.18	5

Final (best of 9 legs)
Mikuru Suzuki 85.87	3
Beau Greaves 88.81	5

=== Women's Series 18 ===
Women's Series 18 was contested on Saturday 29 October 2022 at the Robin Park Sports Centre in Wigan. The tournament was won by Beau Greaves, who won her 6th consecutive event.

Quarter-finals (best of 7 legs)
Lisa Ashton 80.93	4
Anastasia Dobromyslova 76.13 (Note: Anastasia Dobromyslova, of Russia, competed under a neutral designation because of the 2022 Russian invasion of Ukraine.)	1
Rebecca Hoyland 65.23	0
Fallon Sherrock 87.13	4
Beau Greaves 87.28	4
Rhian O'Sullivan 78.30	1
Lorraine Winstanley 73.02	4
Evonne Taylor 72.18	2

Semi-finals (best of 9 legs)
Lisa Ashton 86.45	5
Fallon Sherrock 78.57	2
Lorraine Winstanley 80.91	2
Beau Greaves 86.45	5

Final (best of 9 legs)
Lisa Ashton 87.65	4
Beau Greaves 88.06	5

=== Women's Series 19 ===
Women's Series 19 was contested on Sunday 30 October 2022 at the Robin Park Sports Centre in Wigan. The tournament was won by Beau Greaves who won her 7th straight title, and also broke the world record for the highest average in a women's match in her final with Fallon Sherrock, by hitting a 107.86 average in her 5–3 win.

Quarter-finals (best of 7 legs)
Fallon Sherrock 81.00	4
Anca Zijlstra 74.75	2
Robyn Byrne 76.87	1
Lisa Ashton 90.25	4
Kirsty Hutchinson 73.43	2
Beau Greaves 82.56	4
Anastasia Dobromyslova 73.19 (Note: Anastasia Dobromyslova, of Russia, competed under a neutral designation because of the 2022 Russian invasion of Ukraine.)	2
Natalie Gilbert 74.82	4

Semi-finals (best of 9 legs)
Fallon Sherrock 82.32	5
Lisa Ashton 79.34	3
Beau Greaves 94.02	5
Natalie Gilbert 82.81	3

Final (best of 9 legs)
Fallon Sherrock 89.86	3
Beau Greaves 107.86	5

=== Women's Series 20 ===
Women's Series 20 was contested on Sunday 30 October 2022 at the Robin Park Sports Centre in Wigan. The tournament was won by Beau Greaves, who completed a clean sweep of the 4 events held that weekend. She also qualified for the 2023 PDC World Darts Championship, alongside Lisa Ashton.

Quarter-finals (best of 7 legs)
Aileen de Graaf 73.26	0
Robyn Byrne 87.13	4
Beau Greaves 102.90	4
Lisa Ashton 91.37	1
Mikuru Suzuki 74.10	4
Lorraine Winstanley 76.45	3
Trina Gulliver 78.33	1
Rhian O'Sullivan 87.32	4

Semi-finals (best of 9 legs)
Robyn Byrne 76.23	0
Beau Greaves 82.58	5
Mikuru Suzuki 87.75	5
Rhian O'Sullivan 87.77	3

Final (best of 9 legs)
Beau Greaves 88.12	5
Mikuru Suzuki 73.69	1
