= List of players with a 2022 PDC Tour Card =

A 2022 Tour Card is needed to compete in Professional Darts Corporation ProTour tournaments.

In total 128 players are granted Tour Cards, which enables them to participate in all Players Championships and European Tour Qualifiers.

Most Tour Cards are valid for 2 years. The top 64 in the PDC Order of Merit all receive Tour Cards automatically, and those who won a two-year card in 2021 still had a valid card for 2022. The top player from the European and UK branches of the 2021 Challenge Tour and Development Tour received cards automatically. The remaining places were awarded at the 2022 Q-Schools, with the final four days of competition awarding two Tour Cards per day from the UK Q-School and one a day from the European Q-School; with the remaining players being ranked and the top players also receiving Tour Cards. All players who won a card at either Q-School had their Order of Merit ranking reset to zero.

Kirk Shepherd and Robert Marijanović resigned their Tour Cards despite having a year left on their Cards, meaning an extra 2 places were made available at Q-School.

Boris Koltsov began competing under a neutral nationality starting at Players Championship 14 on 10 May, following the 2022 Russian invasion of Ukraine.

No.	Country	Player	Prize money	Qualified through
1	Wales	Gerwyn Price	£1,206,750	Top 64 of Order of Merit
2	Scotland	Peter Wright	£1,191,500	Top 64 of Order of Merit
3	Netherlands	Michael van Gerwen	£656,750	Top 64 of Order of Merit
4	England	James Wade	£565,750	Top 64 of Order of Merit
5	England	Michael Smith	£540,750	Top 64 of Order of Merit
6	Scotland	Gary Anderson	£487,500	Top 64 of Order of Merit
7	Portugal	José de Sousa	£429,750	Top 64 of Order of Merit
8	Wales	Jonny Clayton	£421,250	Top 64 of Order of Merit
9	Belgium	Dimitri Van den Bergh	£408,750	Top 64 of Order of Merit
10	England	Rob Cross	£357,000	Top 64 of Order of Merit
11	England	Joe Cullen	£313,750	Top 64 of Order of Merit
12	Poland	Krzysztof Ratajski	£310,250	Top 64 of Order of Merit
13	England	Dave Chisnall	£288,000	Top 64 of Order of Merit
14	England	Nathan Aspinall	£275,000	Top 64 of Order of Merit
15	Netherlands	Dirk van Duijvenbode	£271,750	Top 64 of Order of Merit
16	England	Ryan Searle	£261,250	Top 64 of Order of Merit
17	England	Mervyn King	£241,250	Top 64 of Order of Merit
18	Netherlands	Danny Noppert	£233,750	Top 64 of Order of Merit
19	England	Luke Humphries	£224,500	Top 64 of Order of Merit
20	England	Stephen Bunting	£224,250	Top 64 of Order of Merit
21	Germany	Gabriel Clemens	£218,250	Top 64 of Order of Merit
22	Northern Ireland	Daryl Gurney	£213,250	Top 64 of Order of Merit
23	Northern Ireland	Brendan Dolan	£206,000	Top 64 of Order of Merit
24	England	Ian White	£200,000	Top 64 of Order of Merit
25	Australia	Simon Whitlock	£199,750	Top 64 of Order of Merit
26	South Africa	Devon Petersen	£195,500	Top 64 of Order of Merit
27	Austria	Mensur Suljović	£192,000	Top 64 of Order of Merit
28	Netherlands	Vincent van der Voort	£178,000	Top 64 of Order of Merit
29	Australia	Damon Heta	£177,250	Top 64 of Order of Merit
30	England	Callan Rydz	£175,250	Top 64 of Order of Merit
31	England	Glen Durrant	£169,500	Top 64 of Order of Merit
32	England	Chris Dobey	£156,500	Top 64 of Order of Merit
33	England	Ross Smith	£144,250	Top 64 of Order of Merit
34	England	Ryan Joyce	£128,000	Top 64 of Order of Merit
35	Belgium	Kim Huybrechts	£123,000	Top 64 of Order of Merit
36	Netherlands	Jermaine Wattimena	£116,250	Top 64 of Order of Merit
37	Ireland	William O'Connor	£111,250	Top 64 of Order of Merit
38	England	Jamie Hughes	£111,250	Top 64 of Order of Merit
39	England	Adrian Lewis	£106,750	Top 64 of Order of Merit
40	Netherlands	Martijn Kleermaker	£105,500	Top 64 of Order of Merit
41	England	Ricky Evans	£103,000	Top 64 of Order of Merit
42	England	Adam Hunt	£87,500	Top 64 of Order of Merit
43	Lithuania	Darius Labanauskas	£86,000	Top 64 of Order of Merit
44	Ireland	Steve Lennon	£85,000	Top 64 of Order of Merit
45	Netherlands	Jeffrey de Zwaan	£82,750	Top 64 of Order of Merit
46	England	Jason Lowe	£80,500	Top 64 of Order of Merit
47	England	Luke Woodhouse	£71,250	Top 64 of Order of Merit
48	Netherlands	Maik Kuivenhoven	£70,750	Top 64 of Order of Merit
49	Latvia	Madars Razma	£70,750	Top 64 of Order of Merit
50	England	Steve Beaton	£70,000	Top 64 of Order of Merit
51	Scotland	Alan Soutar	£67,000	Top 64 of Order of Merit
52	Netherlands	Ron Meulenkamp	£64,000	Top 64 of Order of Merit
53	Canada	Jeff Smith	£59,000	Top 64 of Order of Merit
54	England	Steve West	£58,500	Top 64 of Order of Merit
55	Scotland	William Borland	£57,000	Top 64 of Order of Merit
56	Scotland	Andy Boulton	£56,600	Top 64 of Order of Merit
57	England	Keegan Brown	£55,000	Top 64 of Order of Merit
58	Netherlands	Raymond van Barneveld	£53,500	Top 64 of Order of Merit
59	Belgium	Mike De Decker	£53,000	Top 64 of Order of Merit
60	England	Ryan Meikle	£52,750	Top 64 of Order of Merit
61	Croatia	Boris Krčmar	£50,000	Top 64 of Order of Merit
62	Germany	Florian Hempel	£49,000	Top 64 of Order of Merit
63	Scotland	John Henderson	£48,750	Top 64 of Order of Merit
64	Germany	Max Hopp	£48,000	Top 64 of Order of Merit
65	Germany	Martin Schindler	£45,500	2021 Q-School
66	England	Ritchie Edhouse	£45,250	2020 Challenge Tour
67	Ireland	Keane Barry	£40,250	2020 Development Tour
68	England	Scott Mitchell	£37,500	2021 Q-School
69	Wales	Lewy Williams	£35,250	2021 Q-School
70	England	Joe Murnan	£35,000	2021 Q-School
71	England	Jason Heaver	£32,500	2021 Q-School
72	Russia; Neutral (Note: Koltsov began using a neutral designation from 10 May 2022.)	Boris Koltsov	£23,000	2021 Q-School
73	Australia	Gordon Mathers	£18,000	2021 Q-School
74	Czech Republic	Adam Gawlas	£17,500	2021 Q-School
75	Greece	John Michael	£14,250	2021 Q-School
76	England	Peter Hudson	£13,500	2021 Q-School
77	England	Eddie Lovely	£11,500	2021 Q-School
78	Netherlands	Niels Zonneveld	£10,750	2021 Q-School
79	Belgium	Geert De Vos	£10,000	2021 Q-School
80	England	Martin Lukeman	£9,500	2021 Q-School
81	United States	Danny Baggish	£8,000	2021 Q-School
82	England	Andrew Gilding	£8,000	2021 Q-School
83	Netherlands	Geert Nentjes	£8,000	2021 Q-School
84	England	John Brown	£8,000	2021 Q-School
85	England	Jack Main	£7,000	2021 Q-School
86	Wales	Jonathan Worsley	£6,500	2021 Q-School
87	England	David Evans	£6,000	2020 Challenge Tour
88	Netherlands	Berry van Peer	£6,000	2020 Development Tour
89	Austria	Zoran Lerchbacher	£6,000	2021 Q-School
90	England	Brett Claydon	£5,000	2021 Q-School
91	England	Jake Jones	£3,500	2021 Q-School
92	Germany	Michael Unterbuchner	£1,500	2021 Q-School
93	Wales	Jim Williams	£0	2021 UK Challenge Tour
94	Canada	Matt Campbell	£0	2021 EU Challenge Tour
95	England	Bradley Brooks	£0	2021 UK Development Tour
96	Austria	Rusty-Jake Rodriguez	£0	2021 EU Development Tour
97	Spain	José Justicia	£0	2022 Q-School
98	England	James Wilson	£0	2022 Q-School
99	Belgium	Brian Raman	£0	2022 Q-School
100	England	Darren Webster	£0	2022 Q-School
101	Netherlands	Luc Peters	£0	2022 Q-School
102	Scotland	Ross Montgomery	£0	2022 Q-School
103	Poland	Krzysztof Kciuk	£0	2022 Q-School
104	Northern Ireland	Josh Rock	£0	2022 Q-School
105	Belgium	Mario Vandenbogaerde	£0	2022 Q-School
106	United States	Jules van Dongen	£0	2022 Q-School
107	Netherlands	Kevin Doets	£0	2022 Q-School
108	Spain	Tony Martinez	£0	2022 Q-School
109	Netherlands	Danny Jansen	£0	2022 Q-School
110	Poland	Radek Szagański	£0	2022 Q-School
111	Netherlands	Damian Mol	£0	2022 Q-School
112	Netherlands	Jimmy Hendriks	£0	2022 Q-School
113	Germany	Ricardo Pietreczko	£0	2022 Q-School
114	Denmark	Vladimir Andersen	£0	2022 Q-School
115	Austria	Rowby-John Rodriguez	£0	2022 Q-School
116	Scotland	Jamie Clark	£0	2022 Q-School
117	England	Ted Evetts	£0	2022 Q-School
118	England	Connor Scutt	£0	2022 Q-School
119	Wales	Richie Burnett	£0	2022 Q-School
120	Northern Ireland	Kevin Burness	£0	2022 Q-School
121	England	Scott Waites	£0	2022 Q-School
122	Northern Ireland	Nathan Rafferty	£0	2022 Q-School
123	Scotland	Cameron Menzies	£0	2022 Q-School
124	Ireland	John O'Shea	£0	2022 Q-School
125	England	George Killington	£0	2022 Q-School
126	Northern Ireland	Mickey Mansell	£0	2022 Q-School
127	England	Nick Fullwell	£0	2022 Q-School
128	England	Shaun Wilkinson	£0	2022 Q-School

== Tour Cards per Nations ==
Nr.	Nation	Number of Tour card holders	Difference to prior year
1.	England	48	−11
2.	Netherlands	18	+2
3.	Scotland	9	+2
4.	Germany	6	−1
4.	Belgium	6	+2
4.	Northern Ireland	6	+3
4.	Wales	6	+1
8.	Ireland	4	±0
8.	Austria	4	+1
10.	Australia	3	±0
10.	Poland	3	+1
12.	Spain	2	±0
12.	Canada	2	+1
12.	United States	2	+1
15.	Czech Republic	1	−1
15.	Greece	1	±0
15.	Croatia	1	±0
15.	Latvia	1	±0
15.	Lithuania	1	±0
15.	Portugal	1	±0
15.	Russia	1	±0
15.	South Africa	1	±0
15.	Denmark	1	+1
	23 Nations	128	

== See also ==
- List of darts players
- List of darts players who have switched organisation
