= Laura Turner (darts player) =

English darts player (born 1983)

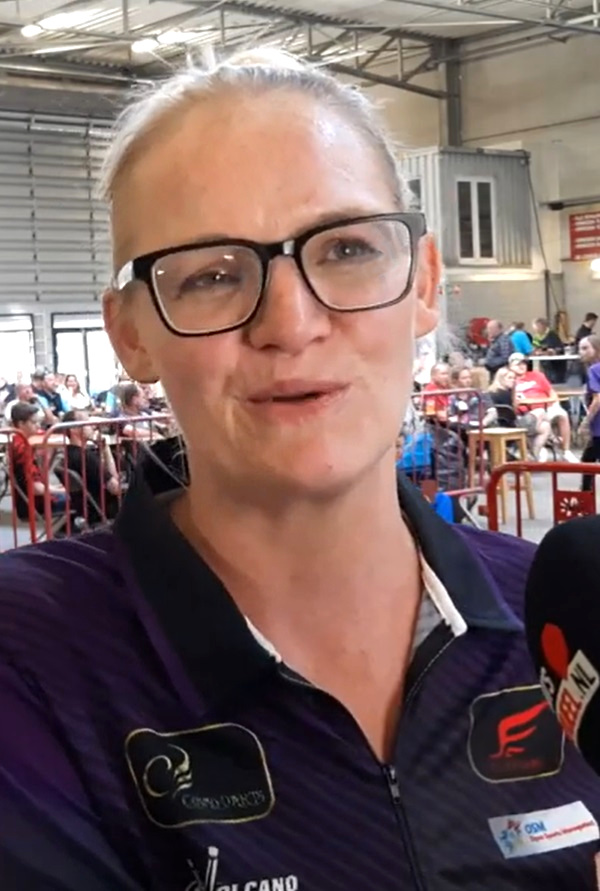
- Turner in 2022

Personal information
- Born: 16 October 1983 (age 43) London, England
- Home town: Byfleet, Surrey, England

Sport
- Sport: Darts
- Playing since: 2011
- Darts: 26g Cosmo Signature
- Laterality: Right-handed
- Walk-on music: "Titanium" by David Guetta featuring Sia

Organisation (see split in darts)
- BDO: 2011, 2014–2020
- WDF: 2014–present
- Current world ranking: (WDF W) 99 (17 August 2026)

WDF major events – best performances
- World Championship: Quarter-final: 2020
- World Masters: Last 32: 2014
- World Trophy: Quarter-final: 2019

Other tournament wins
- Years
Torremolinos Open	2001, 2023
Belgium Open	2022
British Classic	2018
Gibraltar Open	2021
Isle of Man Open	2019
Italian Grand Masters	2019
Slovak Masters	2022
Six Nations Ladies Singles	2025
DPFL Live Event	2025
Medal record
Women's Darts
Representing England
WDF World Cup
Silver medal – second place	2025 Seoul	Women's pairs

Laura Turner (née Power; born 16 October 1983) is an English darts player who competes in Professional Darts Corporation (PDC) and World Darts Federation (WDF) events. She also works as a commentator and pundit for Sky Sports.

== Playing career ==
Turner made her World Championship debut at the 2019 BDO World Darts Championship, losing 0–2 to Anastasia Dobromyslova in the first round (last 16).

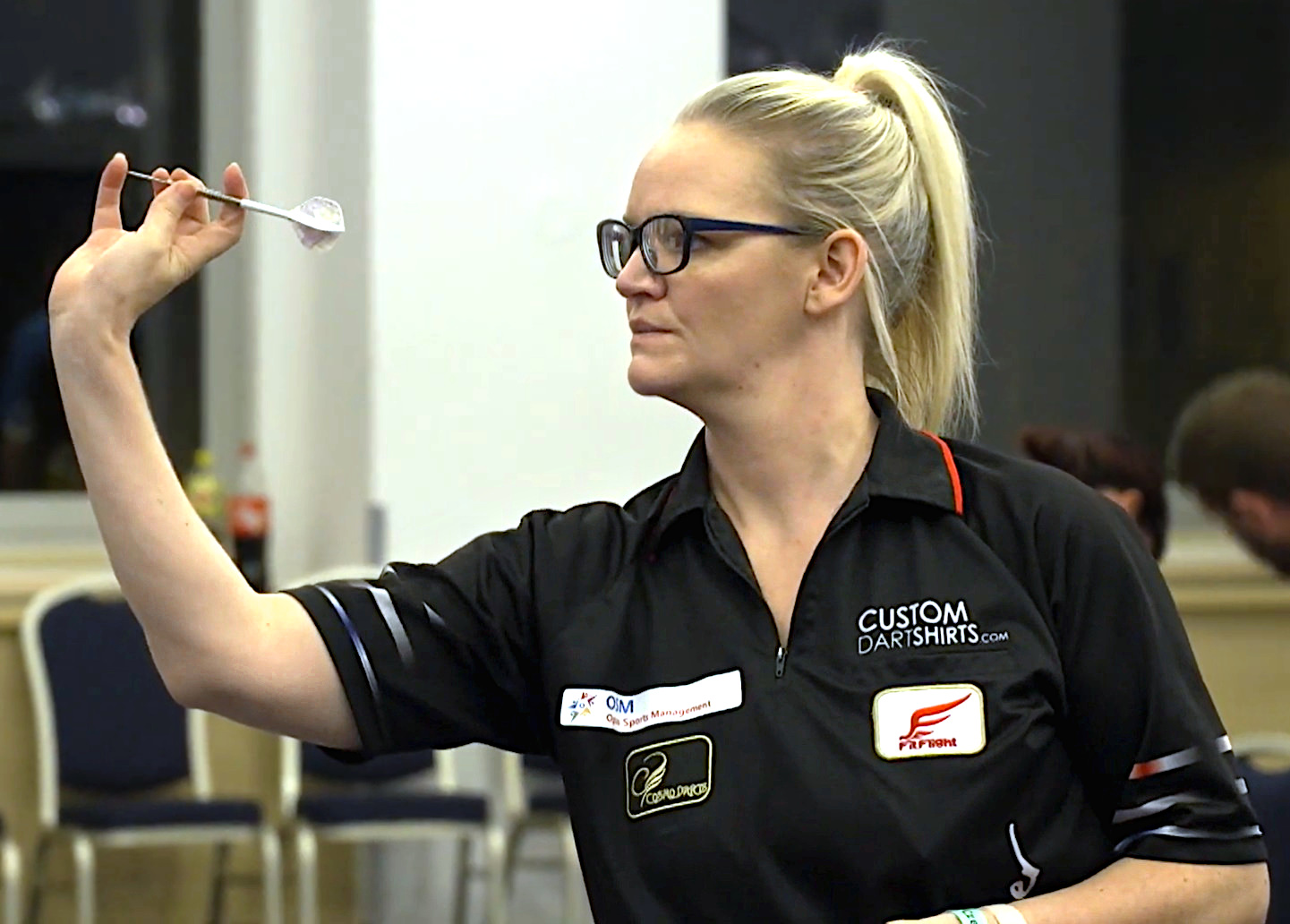
Laura Turner - Czech Open Darts 2021

In 2022 Turner reached two PDC Women's Series event finals and qualified for the inaugural Women's World Matchplay.

== Broadcasting career ==
In the 2020 PDC World Darts Championship Turner joined the Sky Sports Darts commentary team.

== Personal life ==
Turner is married to darts player Aaron Turner from Byfleet, Surrey.

== World Championship results ==
=== BDO/WDF ===
- 2019: First round (lost to Anastasia Dobromyslova 0–2)
- 2020: Quarter-finals (lost to Corrine Hammond 0–2)
- 2022: First round (lost to Mikuru Suzuki 0–2)
- 2023: First round (lost to Lorraine Hyde 1–2)
