= Brian Løkken =

Danish darts player

Personal information
- Nickname: Bright Light
- Born: 20 March 1975 (age 51) Denmark
- Home town: Glostrup, Denmark

Sport
- Sport: Darts
- Playing since: 2014
- Laterality: Right-handed
- Walk-on music: "Always Look On The Bright Side Of Life" by Eric Idle

Organisation (see split in darts)
- BDO: 2014–2020
- WDF: 2014–
- Current world ranking: (WDF) NR (17 August 2026)

WDF major events – best performances
- World Championship: Preliminary Round: 2019
- World Masters: Last 80: 2015
- World Trophy: Last 32: 2019

Other tournament wins
- Tournament: Years
- Gibraltar Open: 2017

Brian Løkken (born 20 March 1975) is a Danish darts player who competed in British Darts Organisation (BDO) events. He qualified for the 2019 BDO World Darts Championship.

== Career ==
In 2017, Løkken won the Gibraltar Open. In 2018, he qualified for the 2019 BDO World Darts Championship as the Baltic/Scandinavian qualifier and played Krzysztof Kciuk of Poland in the preliminary round, but lost 3–1.

He also qualified for the 2018 Danish Darts Open as one of two Danish qualifiers. He lost 6–2 to Cristo Reyes of Spain in the first round.

== World Championship results ==
=== BDO ===
- 2019: Preliminary Round (lost to Krzysztof Kciuk 1–3)
