= Vääksy =

Village in Päijät-Häme, Finland

Coordinates: 61°10′20″N 025°32′50″E

Coat of Arms of Asikkala

Location of Asikkala in Finland

Vääksy (Finnish pronunciation: [ˈʋæːksy]) is a village and seat of the municipality of Asikkala in southern Finland. It is located on an isthmus between Päijänne and Vesijärvi, about 23 kilometres (14 mi) north of Lahti.

The Vääksy canal, Vesijärven kanava, is located in Vääksy. Its length is 1,315 m and the height difference is 3.10±0.25 metres. Nowadays it is the most popular freshwater canal in Finland.

The canal was built during the great hunger years in 1869-71 and completed in 1903–06.

Gallery
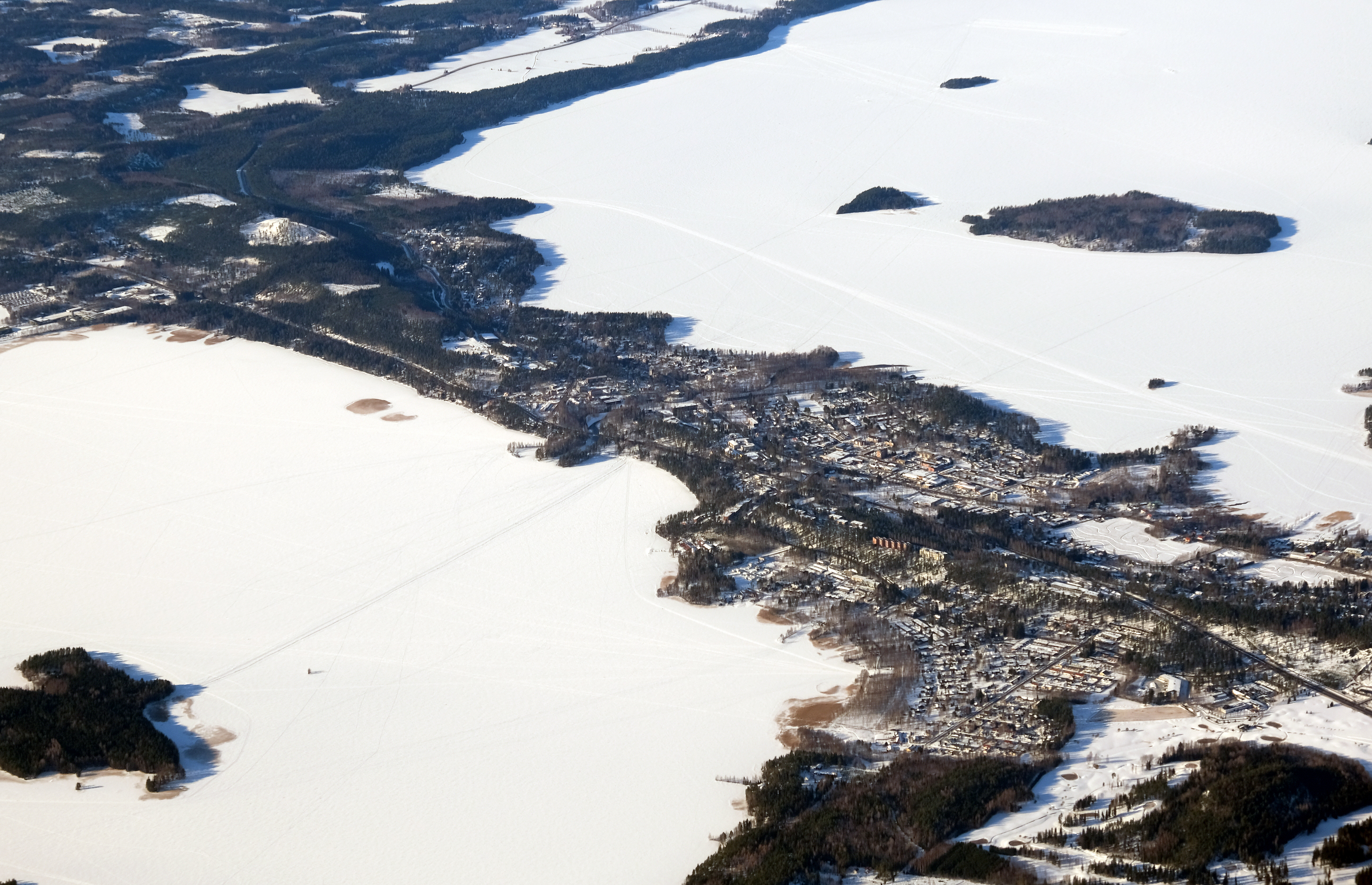
View to Vääksy

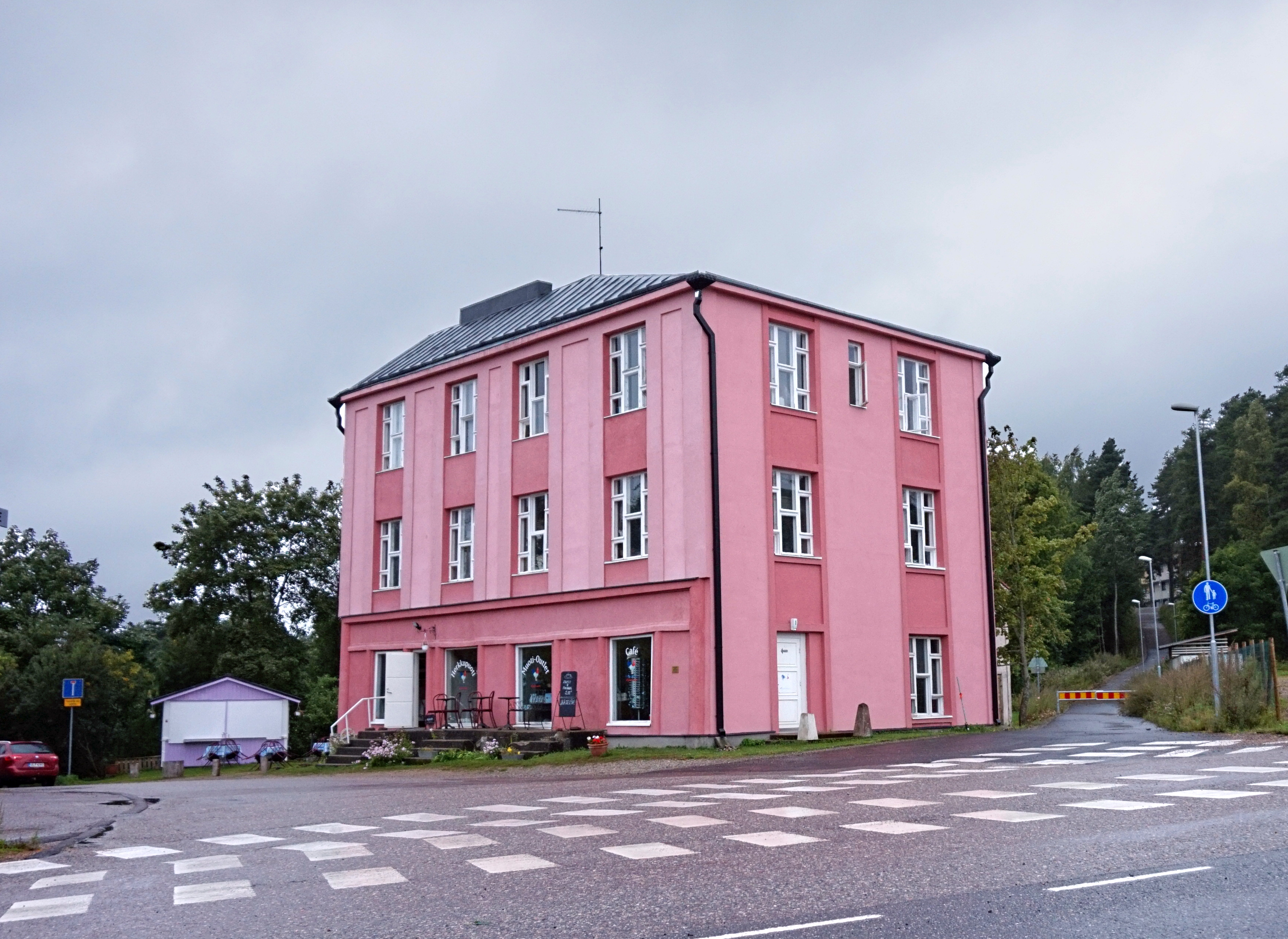
A pink building at Vesijärventie in Vääksy, the oldest apartment building of village. Previously served as a guest house and as residence. Today as a ’French-style village shop’.

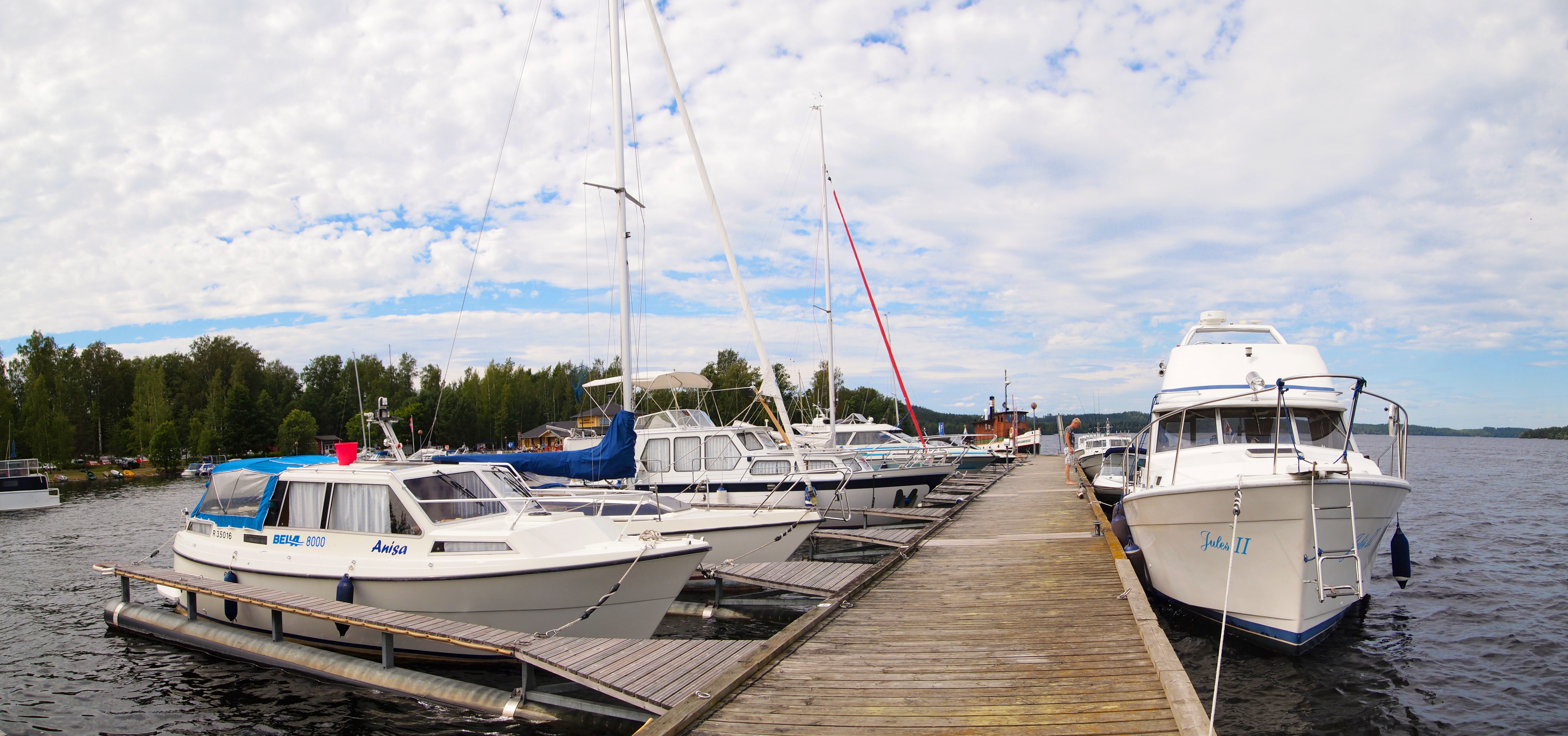
Vääksy harbour in Päijänne

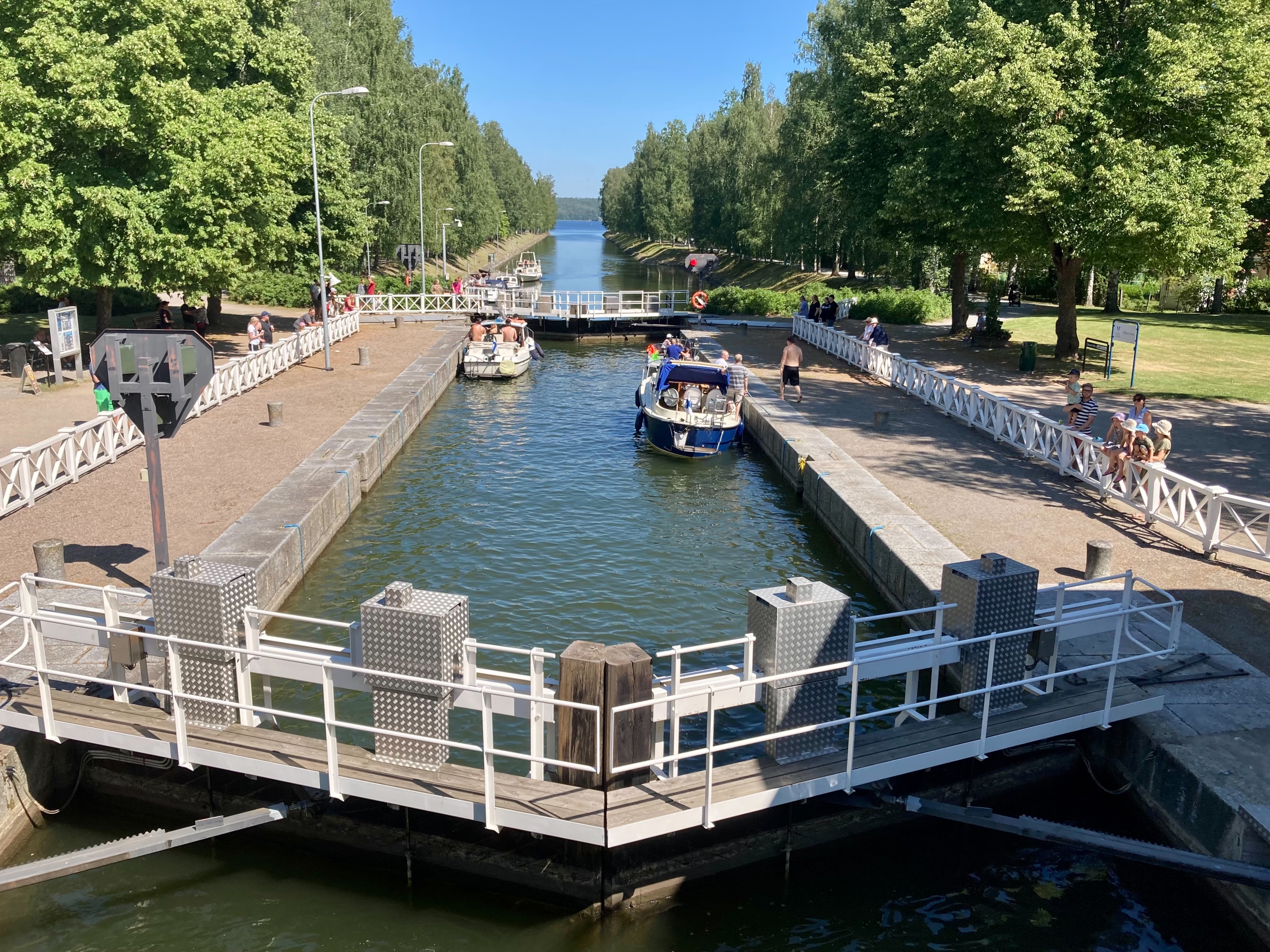
Vääksy canal
