= Daniel Larsson (darts player) =

Swedish darts player (born 1981)

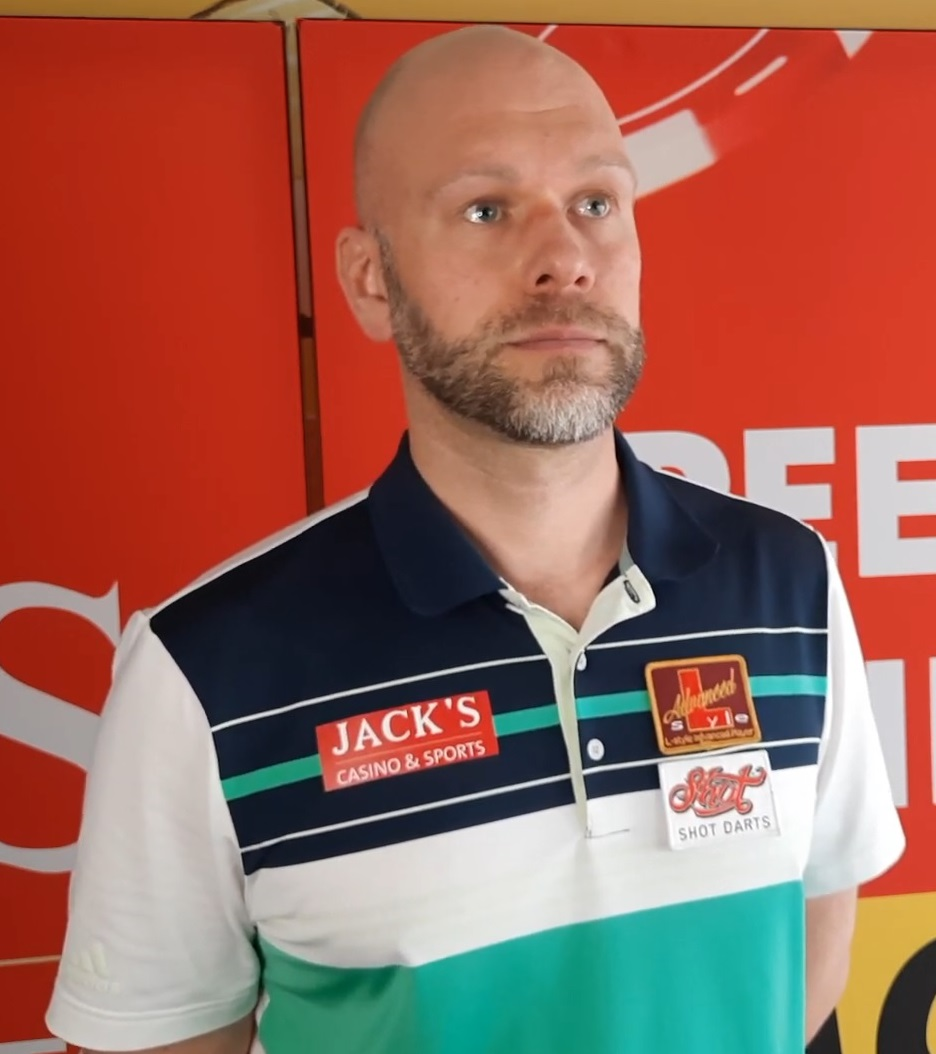
- Larsson in 2022

Personal information
- Born: 19 June 1981 (age 45) Uppsala, Sweden
- Home town: Storvreta, Sweden

Sport
- Sport: Darts
- Playing since: 1995
- Darts: 24g Cosmo Signature
- Laterality: Right-handed
- Walk-on music: "Kickstart My Heart" by Mötley Crüe

Organisation (see split in darts)
- BDO: 2004–2016
- PDC: 2017–present (Tour Card: 2020–2021)

WDF major events – best performances
- World Championship: Last 32: 2009, 2015
- World Masters: Last 16: 2014

PDC premier events – best performances
- World Championship: Last 64: 2019
- UK Open: Last 128: 2020

Other tournament wins
- Years
Finnish Masters	2017
Finnish Open	2015
Nordic Cup	2014
Nordic Cup Open	2016
SSDC Open	2016
Swedish Classic	2018
WDF Europe Cup Team	2018
PDCNB Pro Tour
PDCNB Iceland	2021
PDCNB Denmark	2018, 2022, 2025
PDCNB Sweden	2018, 2023, 2026
PDCNB Finland	2020
SDC Denmark	2016

Daniel Larsson (born 19 June 1981) is a Swedish professional darts player who competes in Professional Darts Corporation (PDC) events.

Larrason has represented Sweden at the PDC World Cup of Darts, reaching the last 16 at the 2022 edition. He has finished as the runner-up in the PDC Nordic & Baltic (PDCNB) Pro Tour rankings on three occasions in 2018, 2021 and 2022. Larsson has won a total of 9 PDCNB titles.

He has played in 6 World Darts Championships (2 BDO and 4 PDC).

== Career ==
Larsson reached the semi-final of the 2006 WDF Europe Cup, scoring wins over Tony O'Shea and Martin Phillips before losing to Niels de Ruiter. He then reached the final of the Sweden National Championship, losing to Alan Norris.

On 4 December 2008 Larsson qualified for the 2009 BDO World Darts Championship, winning one of five spots. He defeated Steve Farmer in the earlier rounds and then beat Paul Gibbs and Stephen Bunting to qualify. He was drawn against O'Shea in the first round and lost 3–0.

In 2018 Larsson competed on the PDC Nordic & Baltic Pro Tour, finishing in the top two to qualify for the 2019 PDC World Darts Championship. In the first round he defeated Robert Thornton in his best win to date before losing to Kim Huybrechts in the second round.

On 19 January 2020, Larsson won a two-year PDC Tour Card by finishing fifth on the European Q-School Order of Merit. He played on the PDC Pro Tour in 2020 and 2021, but only earned £20,000 in ranking money and therefore lost his card. Larsson finished second on the PDC Nordic & Baltic rankings in 2021 and 2022 which qualified him for the PDC World Darts Championship. However, Larsson lost in the first round on each occasion.

== World Championship results ==
=== BDO ===
- 2009: First round (lost to Tony O'Shea 0–3)
- 2015: First round (lost to Alan Norris 2–3)

=== PDC ===
- 2019: Second round (lost to Kim Huybrechts 0–3)
- 2021: First round (lost to Steve Lennon 1–3)
- 2022: First round (lost to Jason Lowe 0–3)
- 2023: First round (lost to Adrian Lewis 0–3)

== Performance timeline ==
Daniel Larsson's performance timeline is as follows:

=== BDO ===
Tournament	2005	2006	2007	2008	2009	2012	2013	2014	2015
BDO Ranked televised events
World Championship	Did not qualify/participate				1R	DNQ/DNP			1R
World Masters	2R	3R	2R	3R	3R	1R	5R	6R	2R

=== PDC ===
Tournament	2015	2016	2017	2018	2019	2020	2021	2022	2023
PDC Ranked televised events
World Championship	Did not qualify/participate				2R	DNQ	1R	1R	1R
UK Open	Did not qualify/participate					2R	WD	DNP	
Non-ranked televised events
World Cup	1R	1R	1R	1R	DNP	1R	1R	2R	DNP
Career statistics
Year-end ranking	-	-	141	159	184	113	99	124	-

==== European Tour ====
Season	1	2	3	4	5	6	7	8	9	10	11	12	13
2017	GDC; DNQ	GDM; 2R	Did not qualify							GDG; 2R	DNQ		
2018	DNQ		GDO; 3R	Did not qualify									
2019	Did not qualify								CDO; 1R	DNQ		IDO; 1R	GDT; DNQ
2020	BDC; DNQ	GDC; 1R	DNQ										
2022	DNQ		GDG; 1R	DNQ				DDC; 3R	EDM; DNQ	HDT; 1R	GDO; 2R	DNQ	
2024	Did not qualify					BSD; 1R	Did not qualify						

==== Players Championships ====
Season	1	2	3	4	5	6	7	8	9	10	11	12	13	14	15	16	17	18	19	20	21	22	23	24	25	26	27	28	29	30
2020	BAR; 2R	BAR; 1R	WIG; 1R	WIG; 4R	Did not participate									NIE; 1R	NIE; 2R	NIE; 1R	NIE; 1R	NIE; 1R	COV; 1R	COV; 1R	COV; 2R	COV; 1R	COV; 2R							
2021	BOL; 1R	BOL; 1R	BOL; 1R	BOL; 1R	MIL; 1R	MIL; 1R	MIL; 1R	MIL; 1R	Did not participate												BAR; 1R	BAR; 2R	BAR; 1R	BAR; Did not participate						

Performance Table Legend
W	Won the tournament	F	Finalist	SF	Semifinalist	QF	Quarterfinalist	#R; RR; Prel.	Lost in # round Round-robin; Preliminary round	DQ	Disqualified
DNQ	Did not qualify	DNP	Did not participate	WD	Withdrew	NH	Tournament not held	#R; RR; Prel.	Lost in # round Round-robin; Preliminary round	NYF	Not yet founded
