= Rhian Griffiths =

Welsh darts player

Personal information
- Born: 30 September 1980 (age 46) Carmarthen, Wales
- Home town: Ebbw Vale, Wales

Sport
- Sport: Darts
- Playing since: 1999
- Darts: 24 Gram
- Laterality: Right-handed
- Walk-on music: "Highway to Hell" by AC/DC

Organisation (see split in darts)
- BDO: 2013–2020
- WDF: 2013–2021

WDF major events – best performances
- World Championship: Last 16: 2017, 2018
- World Masters: Last 12: 2016
- World Trophy: Semi-final: 2016

Other tournament wins
- Tournament: Years
- WDF Europe Cup Ladies Pairs: 2016

Rhian Griffiths (born 30 September 1980) is a Welsh darts player who competed in British Darts Organisation (BDO) and World Darts Federation (WDF) events.

== Career ==
Griffiths reached the semi-finals of the 2016 BDO World Trophy, losing to Deta Hedman 6–1. She qualified for the 2017 BDO World Darts Championship, where she lost to Anastasia Dobromyslova in the last 16.

== World Championship results ==
=== BDO ===
- 2017: Last 16 (lost to Anastasia Dobromyslova 1–2) (sets)
- 2018: Last 16 (lost to Lisa Ashton 0–2)
