= 2026 Women's World Matchplay =

2026 Betfred Women's World Matchplay

Tournament information
- Dates: 26 July 2026
- Venue: Winter Gardens
- Location: Blackpool, England
- Organisation(s): Professional Darts Corporation (PDC)
- Format: Legs
- Prize fund: £40,000
- Winner's share: £15,000
- High checkout: 148; Beau Greaves

Champion(s)
- Beau Greaves (ENG)

The 2026 Women's World Matchplay (known for sponsorship reasons as the 2026 Betfred Women's World Matchplay) was a women's darts tournament that took place at the Winter Gardens in Blackpool, England, on 26 July 2026. It was the fifth staging of the Women's World Matchplay by the Professional Darts Corporation (PDC), taking place in the afternoon before the main tournament's final. The total prize fund was £40,000, with the winner receiving £15,000 and earning qualification for the 2026 Grand Slam of Darts, and the 2027 PDC World Darts Championship.

Sponsored by Betfred, the tournament featured the top eight players on the one-year Women's World Matchplay Order of Merit, based on earnings won during the 2025 and 2026 seasons of the PDC Women's Series. Vicky Pruim and Deta Hedman made their debuts at the event.

Lisa Ashton was the defending champion, having defeated Fallon Sherrock 6–5 in the 2025 final. However, she lost 5–1 to Sherrock in a semi-final rematch. Beau Greaves won her third World Matchplay title, defeating Sherrock 6–5 in the final.

== Overview ==
=== Background ===
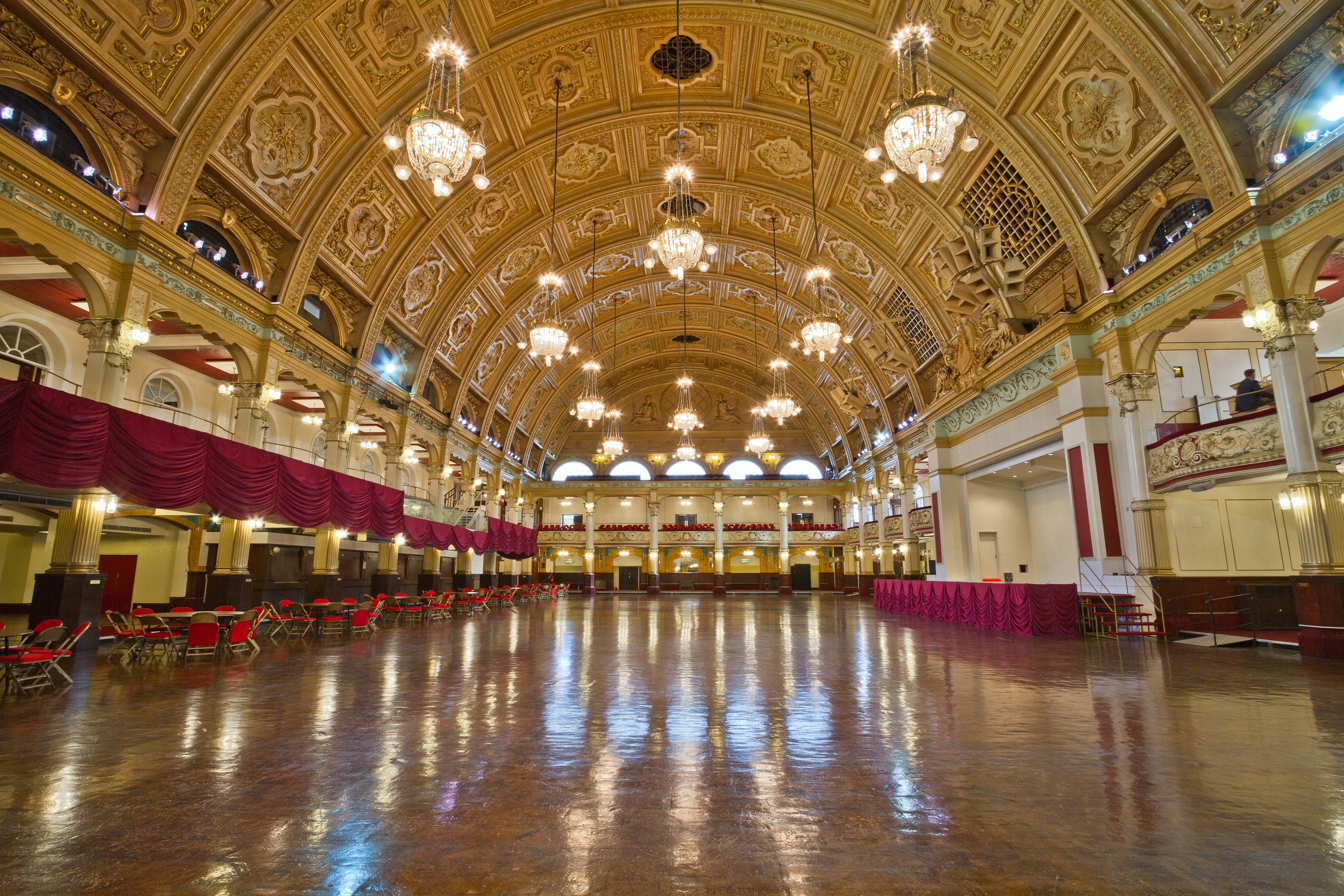
The tournament was held in the Empress Ballroom (pictured in 2016) at the Winter Gardens, Blackpool, England.

The 2026 Women's World Matchplay was the fifth edition of the tournament to be staged by the Professional Darts Corporation (PDC). It was the first women's event to be fully televised by the organisation, being introduced in 2022 as part of the PDC's expanded commitment to women's darts after the establishment of the PDC Women's Series. Fallon Sherrock, the first female player to win a match at the PDC World Darts Championship, won the inaugural edition by defeating Aileen de Graaf 6–3 in the final. This granted her qualification to the 2022 Grand Slam of Darts, although she was later granted a place at the 2023 World Championship as the Women's World Matchplay champion.

The 2026 edition took place on the afternoon of 26 July 2026 in the Empress Ballroom, located within the Winter Gardens in Blackpool, England. British bookmaker Betfred continued its sponsorship of the event, extending its partnership with the PDC to sponsor the main tournament and the women's equivalent until 2030. Lisa Ashton entered the tournament as defending champion, having defeated Fallon Sherrock 6–5 in the 2025 final to win her first World Matchplay title.

=== Format ===
The eight-played field was seeded into a tournament bracket based on the Women's World Matchplay Order of Merit. All matches were in leg play format, with the number of legs required to win increasing as the tournament progressed:

- Quarter-finals: Best of nine legs
- Semi-finals: Best of nine legs
- Final: Best of eleven legs

=== Prize money ===
The total prize fund was increased from £25,000 in 2025 to £40,000 in 2026. The winner received £15,000. The prize money breakdown was:

Position (no. of players)		Prize money (Total: £40,000)
Winner	(1)	£15,000
Runner-up	(1)	£8,000
Semi-finalists	(2)	£4,500
Quarter-finalists	(4)	£2,000

== Qualification ==
2026 Women's World Matchplay Race
Rank	Player	Earnings
1	Beau Greaves	£45,700
2	Lisa Ashton	£15,550
3	Fallon Sherrock	£13,150
4	Gemma Hayter	£9,800
5	Vicky Pruim	£8,250
6	Deta Hedman	£7,500
7	Rhian O'Sullivan	£6,300
8	Kirsi Viinikainen	£6,150
9	Steph Clarke	£5,250
10	Trina Gulliver	£5,200

The eight qualifiers for the tournament were the top eight players on the Women's World Matchplay Order of Merit, a one-year ranking based on earnings won across the 2025 and 2026 seasons of the PDC Women's Series since July 2025. Two-time champion and ranking leader Beau Greaves automatically qualified as the only female player with a 2026 PDC Tour Card, having accepted a place on the PDC Pro Tour after placing second on the 2025 PDC Development Tour. Vicky Pruim and Deta Hedman made their debuts at the event, the latter entering the tournament as the reigning WDF women's world champion.

Player	Appearance in Women's World Matchplay	Previous best performance
Beau Greaves (ENG)	4th	Winner (2023, 2024)
Lisa Ashton (ENG)	5th	Winner (2025)
Fallon Sherrock (ENG)	5th	Winner (2022)
Gemma Hayter (ENG)	2nd	Quarter-finals (2025)
Vicky Pruim (SWE)	Debut	—N/a
Deta Hedman (ENG)	Debut	—N/a
Rhian O'Sullivan (WAL)	3rd	Quarter-finals (2023, 2024)
Kirsi Viinikainen (FIN)	2nd	Quarter-finals (2025)

The qualifiers in seeding order were:

1. Beau Greaves (ENG) (champion)
2. Lisa Ashton (ENG) (semi-finals)
3. Fallon Sherrock (ENG) (runner-up)
4. Gemma Hayter (ENG) (semi-finals)
5. Vicky Pruim (SWE) (quarter-finals)
6. Deta Hedman (ENG) (quarter-finals)
7. Rhian O'Sullivan (WAL) (quarter-finals)
8. Kirsi Viinikainen (FIN) (quarter-finals)

== Summary ==
=== Quarter-finals ===
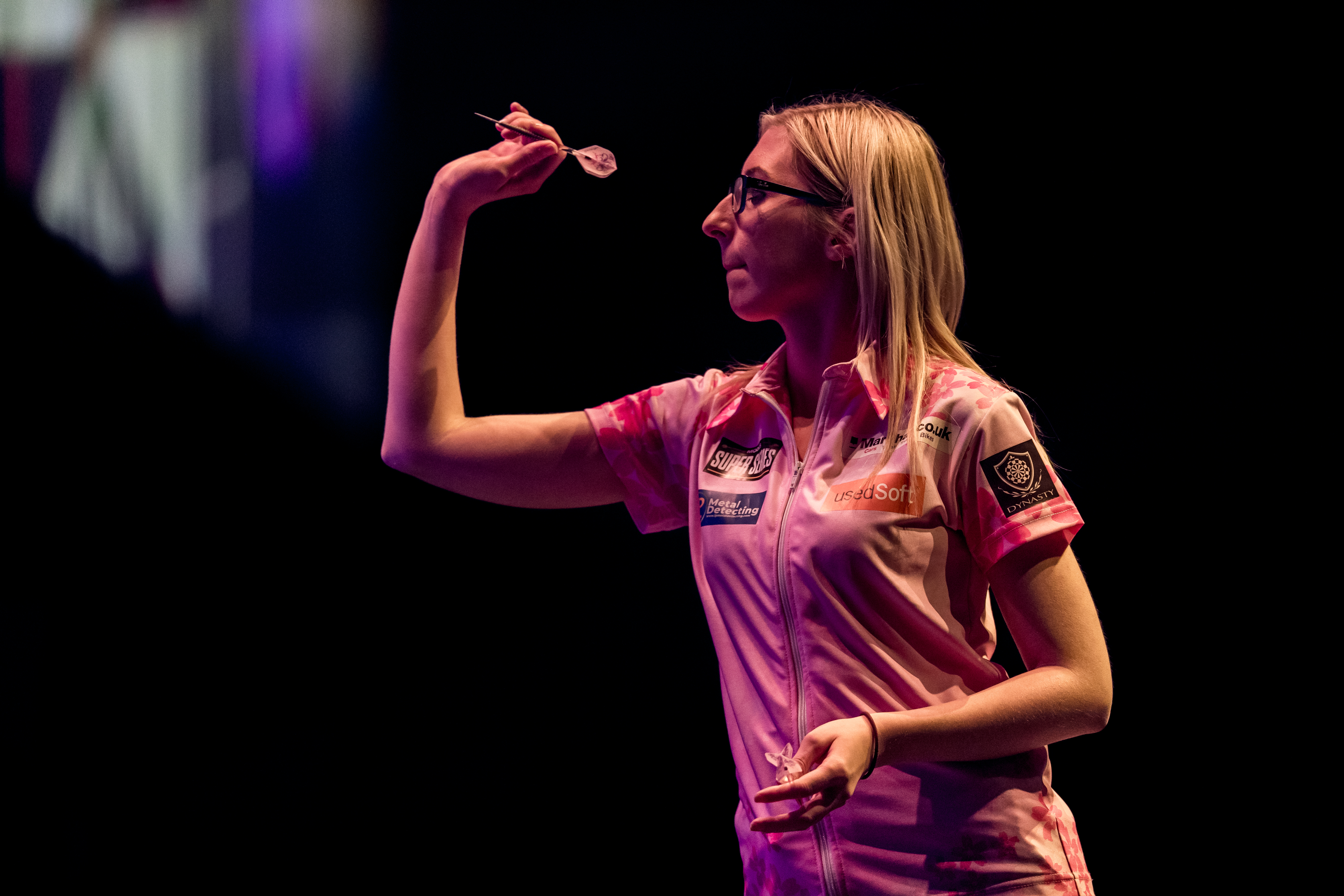
The 2022 champion Fallon Sherrock (pictured in 2022) reached her third consecutive final.

Top seed Beau Greaves began her campaign with a 5–1 victory over Kirsi Viinikainen, converting checkouts of 148 and 144 during the contest. Gemma Hayter won a deciding leg against Swedish debutant Vicky Pruim to achieve her first win at the tournament. Reigning champion Lisa Ashton hit a 120 checkout as she started her title defence by defeating Rhian O'Sullivan 5–2, closing out the match with her ninth match dart. The 2022 champion Fallon Sherrock was victorious in the last quarter-final, earning a whitewash victory over Deta Hedman without allowing the English debutant a dart at double.

=== Semi-finals ===
Beau Greaves was taken to a deciding leg by Gemma Hayter in the first semi-final. Hayter found a break of throw to level the match at 2–2, before hitting an 83 checkout for another break to take the match to a ninth leg. Greaves secured her place in the final by converting a 104 finish to win 5–4. In a rematch of the 2025 final, Fallon Sherrock avenged her loss to Lisa Ashton by eliminating the defending champion in a 5–1 victory, entering the final having lost just one leg.

=== Final ===
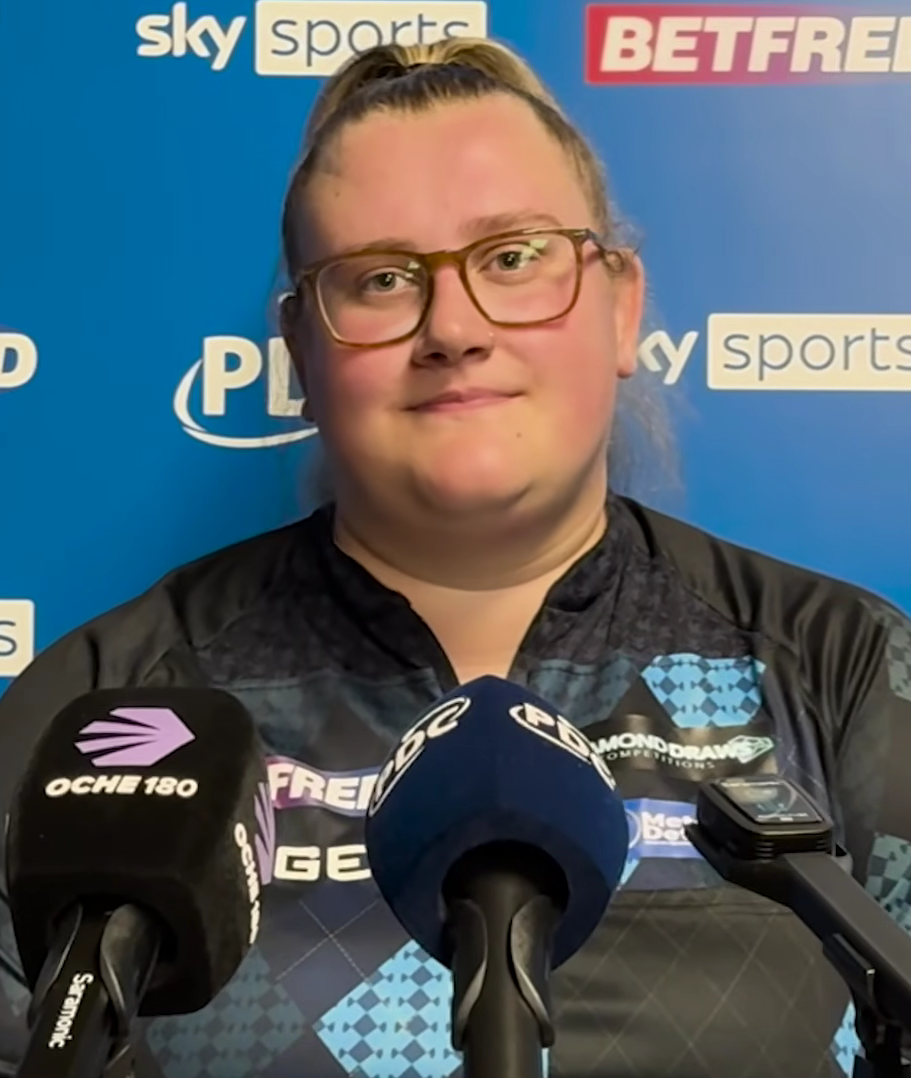
Beau Greaves (pictured after her victory) won her third Women's World Matchplay title.

The final was contested by top seed Beau Greaves and third seed Fallon Sherrock, with the latter reaching her third consecutive final. It was a rematch of the 2024 final, which Greaves won 6–3. Sherrock broke Greaves' throw with an 87 checkout to take an early 2–1 lead, but Greaves responded with a 120 finish to break back. Greaves capitalised on missed doubles from Sherrock to pin double 2 in the eighth leg and go 5–3 ahead, one away from victory. However, Sherrock recorded an 11-dart break of throw and a 70 checkout to take the final to a deciding leg. The pair shared maximums in the title decider, before Greaves followed a 145 set-up shot with a 56 finish on double 10 to complete a 6–5 triumph. Greaves ended the match with a three-dart average of 88.63, compared to Sherrock's 87.84.

Greaves won the Women's World Matchplay for the third time in four years, adding to her back-to-back victories in 2023 and 2024. The win also guaranteed Greaves' qualification for the 2026 Grand Slam of Darts and the 2027 PDC World Darts Championship. Sherrock suffered her third consecutive final defeat, following losses to Greaves in 2024 and Lisa Ashton in 2025. In her post-match interview, Greaves said she was nervous due to the pressure of the final and that hitting the last dart was an "outpouring of relief" after her elimination the previous year. She also commented on balancing men's and women's darts, admitting that she felt "deflated" after her last Women's Series performances and that she was thinking about focusing on her work on the Pro Tour. "If somebody had said to me I'd get to the final, I'd have bitten their hand off," said Sherrock in defeat, who aimed to take the positives out of the tournament and focus on qualifying for the World Championship.

== Draw ==
The draw was confirmed following Event 16 of the 2026 PDC Women's Series on 21 June. Numbers to the left of players' names show the seedings for the tournament. The figures to the right of a player's name state their three-dart average in a match. Players in bold denote match winners.

**Quarter-finals** (best of 9 legs)
**1**	**Beau Greaves 91.91**	**5**
8	Kirsi Viinikainen 78.10	1
**4**	**Gemma Hayter 79.01**	**5**
5	Vicky Pruim 72.22	4
**2**	**Lisa Ashton 81.07**	**5**
7	Rhian O'Sullivan 75.52	2
**3**	**Fallon Sherrock 85.40**	**5**
6	Deta Hedman 67.04	0

**Semi-finals** (best of 9 legs)
**1**	**Beau Greaves 86.74**	**5**
4	Gemma Hayter 80.44	4
2	Lisa Ashton 79.41	1
**3**	**Fallon Sherrock 90.55**	**5**

**Final** (best of 11 legs)
**1**	**Beau Greaves 88.63**	**6**
3	Fallon Sherrock 87.84	5
