= 2025 PDC Women's Series =

Series of darts tournaments

The 2025 PDC Women's Series was the sixth edition of the PDC Women's Series, a darts tour for women organised by the Professional Darts Corporation (PDC). It consisted of 24 tournaments played over six weekends of four events each, and was open to all female darts players over the age of 16. The series was won by defending champion Beau Greaves, who won 18 of the 24 events, setting a record for the most events won in a season.

== Format ==
Prize money for PDC Women's Series events
Stage reached	Award (£)
Winner	2,000
Runner-up	1,000
Semi-finalist	500
Quarter-finalist	300
Last 16	200
Last 32	100
Last 64 (Note: Prize money for reaching the last 64 on the Women's Series is awarded only when there at least 128 participants.)	50
Total	10,000

All female players who were outside of the top 64 of the PDC Order of Merit, or were at least 16 years of age on the cut-off date of a Women's Series event, were eligible to compete in the Women's Series. Prize money was awarded at each event, with a maximum prize of £2,000 awarded to each event's winner. Prize money won on Women's Series events in 2025 counted towards the Women's Series Order of Merit, which was used to determine qualification for future tournaments.

Under PDC Order of Merit Rule 6.9, the Women's Series prizes were as follows:

- The top three players on the Women's Series Order of Merit, who have not obtained qualification via another method, receive a place in the first round of the World Darts Championship.
- The top player on the Women's Series Order of Merit, who has not qualified via another method, receives a place at the Grand Slam of Darts.
- The players in the Top 8 of the Women's Series Order of Merit, who have not obtained a PDC Tour Card before the 2025 Qualifying School (Q-School), receive free entry to the 2026 edition of Q-School.
- The highest ranked player aged under 24 on the Women's Series Order of Merit obtains a place in the PDC World Youth Championship.

Additionally, earnings from Women's Series events held in late 2024 and early 2025 counted towards the Women's World Matchplay Order of Merit. The top eight players on this qualified for the 2025 Women's World Matchplay, a televised tournament held concurrently with the 2025 World Matchplay. The Women's World Matchplay offered an additional qualification route to major tournaments, with 2025 winner Lisa Ashton qualifying for the 2025 Grand Slam of Darts and 2026 PDC World Darts Championship.

== Summary ==
The 2025 Women's Series was dominated by Beau Greaves, who won 18 of the 24 events. However, the series started competitively, with 2022 Women's Series winner Lisa Ashton winning the first event after Greaves was eliminated and 2021 winner Fallon Sherrock ending a run of seven consecutive defeats to Greaves to win the second event. The next day, Greaves won the third and fourth events of the season and continued this form into the second weekend, where she won three of the four events. The other was won by Kirsi Viinikainen, who beat Sherrock to win her first Women's Series title. Greaves' form dipped on the third weekend, failing to reach the quarter-final stage in the first three events, while Noa-Lynn van Leuven took advantage to win two titles on home soil. Van Leuven's opponent in the ninth event was Stefanie Lück, who became the first German to reach a Women's Series final. Sherrock took her second title of the season in the eleventh event, while Greaves returned to winning ways in the final event of the weekend, defeating Byrne in a final for the third time in the season. This marked the start of an 86-match winning streak for Greaves, who won every remaining tournament in the series and sealed the top spot in the rankings with a weekend to spare.

== February ==
=== Women's Series 1 ===
Women's Series 1 was contested on Saturday 15 February 2025 at the Leicester Arena.

The event was won by Lisa Ashton who defeated Gemma Hayter 5–2 in the final.

Quarter-finals (best of 9 legs)
Robyn Byrne 82.17	1
Lorraine Winstanley 83.06	5
Noa-Lynn van Leuven 85.74	3
Gemma Hayter 88.83	5
Aileen de Graaf 70.99	5
Jo Locke 77.23	4
Kirsi Viinikainen 84.16	1
Lisa Ashton 86.13	5

Semi-finals (best of 9 legs)
Lorraine Winstanley 76.61	1
Gemma Hayter 89.46	5
Aileen de Graaf 74.06	3
Lisa Ashton 79.99	5

Final (best of 9 legs)
Gemma Hayter 78.08	2
Lisa Ashton 92.01	5

=== Women's Series 2 ===
Women's Series 2 was contested on Saturday 15 February 2025 at the Leicester Arena.

The event was won by Fallon Sherrock who defeated Beau Greaves 5–3 in the final.

Quarter-finals (best of 9 legs)
Aurora Fochesato 69.20	5
Rhian O'Sullivan 65.79	3
Beau Greaves 89.46	5
Vicky Pruim 71.29	0
Fallon Sherrock 80.40	5
Paige Pauling 81.60	2
Kyana Frauenfelder 71.23	1
Lisa Ashton 80.25	5

Semi-finals (best of 9 legs)
Aurora Fochesato 69.03	0
Beau Greaves 83.50	5
Fallon Sherrock 82.46	5
Lisa Ashton 77.54	4

Final (best of 9 legs)
Beau Greaves 76.93	3
Fallon Sherrock 76.85	5

=== Women's Series 3 ===
Women's Series 3 was contested on Sunday 16 February 2025 at the Leicester Arena.

The event was won by Beau Greaves who defeated Robyn Byrne 5–1 in the final.

Quarter-finals (best of 9 legs)
Robyn Byrne 73.67	5
Natalie Gilbert 73.00	3
Paige Pauling 73.80	5
Kirsi Viinikainen 70.93	2
Fallon Sherrock 78.72	1
Beau Greaves 89.45	5
Jo Locke 82.94	5
Rhian O'Sullivan 77.04	4

Semi-finals (best of 9 legs)
Robyn Byrne 71.49	5
Paige Pauling 69.42	4
Beau Greaves 86.24	5
Jo Locke 72.76	1

Final (best of 9 legs)
Robyn Byrne 72.75	1
Beau Greaves 91.42	5

=== Women's Series 4 ===
Women's Series 4 was contested on Sunday 16 February 2025 at the Leicester Arena.

The event was won by Beau Greaves who defeated Gemma Hayter 5–4 in the final.

Quarter-finals (best of 9 legs)
Jo Locke 76.70	2
Gemma Hayter 82.10	5
Neuza Araujo 76.20	5
Paige Pauling 72.14	3
Beau Greaves 93.24	5
Lisa Ashton 78.31	2
Kirsi Viinikainen 67.57	5
Steph Clarke 63.40	2

Semi-finals (best of 9 legs)
Gemma Hayter 84.39	5
Neuza Araujo 81.81	3
Beau Greaves 87.26	5
Kirsi Viinikainen 71.10	1

Final (best of 9 legs)
Gemma Hayter 92.93	4
Beau Greaves 89.77	5

== March ==
=== Women's Series 5 ===
Women's Series 5 was contested on Saturday 8 March 2025 at the Leicester Arena.

The event was won by Kirsi Viinikainen who defeated Fallon Sherrock 5–2 in the final.

Quarter-finals (best of 9 legs)
Kirsi Viinikainen 79.11	5
Robyn Byrne 77.90	4
Noa-Lynn van Leuven 78.15	4
Eleanor Cairns 72.80	5
Rhian O'Sullivan 65.53	1
Fallon Sherrock 80.68	5
Natalie Gilbert 79.34	4
Lisa Ashton 85.13	5

Semi-finals (best of 9 legs)
Kirsi Viinikainen 70.42	5
Eleanor Cairns 69.13	3
Fallon Sherrock 86.50	5
Lisa Ashton 85.90	3

Final (best of 9 legs)
Kirsi Viinikainen 84.89	5
Fallon Sherrock 80.60	2

=== Women's Series 6 ===
Women's Series 6 was contested on Saturday 8 March 2025 at the Leicester Arena.

The event was won by Beau Greaves who defeated Lisa Ashton 5–1 in the final.

Quarter-finals (best of 9 legs)
Anastasia Dobromyslova 66.81 (Note: Anastasia Dobromyslova has competed under a neutral designation since the 2022 Russian invasion of Ukraine.)	0
Lisa Ashton 77.47	5
Denise Cassidy 75.82	3
Laura Turner 79.34	5
Lorraine Winstanley 64.29	5
Stacey Ellis 66.08	4
Beau Greaves 88.45	5
Gemma Hayter 75.66	3

Semi-finals (best of 9 legs)
Lisa Ashton 85.40	5
Laura Turner 77.18	0
Lorraine Winstanley 69.36	2
Beau Greaves 92.33	5

Final (best of 9 legs)
Lisa Ashton 85.15	1
Beau Greaves 86.88	5

=== Women's Series 7 ===
Women's Series 7 was contested on Sunday 9 March 2025 at the Leicester Arena.

The event was won by Beau Greaves who defeated Katie Sheldon 5–0 in the final.

Quarter-finals (best of 9 legs)
Angela Kirkwood 71.34	5
Noa-Lynn van Leuven 72.23	3
Fallon Sherrock 84.95	3
Beau Greaves 92.18	5
Lorraine Hyde 75.56	5
Victoria Cauteruccio 68.04	4
Katie Sheldon 70.83	5
Rose Mort 71.34	3

Semi-finals (best of 9 legs)
Angela Kirkwood 82.01	1
Beau Greaves 99.40	5
Lorraine Hyde 65.41	0
Katie Sheldon 77.47	5

Final (best of 9 legs)
Beau Greaves 92.78	5
Katie Sheldon 73.78	0

=== Women's Series 8 ===
Women's Series 8 was contested on Sunday 9 March 2025 at the Leicester Arena.

The event was won by Beau Greaves who defeated Robyn Byrne 5–1 in the final.

Quarter-finals (best of 9 legs)
Angela Kirkwood 78.23	0
Gemma Hayter 93.34	5
Robyn Byrne 77.83	5
Aletta Wajer 68.17	2
Lorraine Hyde 59.55	1
Lorraine Winstanley 70.42	5
Beau Greaves 97.41	5
Lisa Ashton 97.14	3

Semi-finals (best of 9 legs)
Gemma Hayter 75.25	4
Robyn Byrne 75.98	5
Lorraine Winstanley 65.03	0
Beau Greaves 76.68	5

Final (best of 9 legs)
Robyn Byrne 76.20	1
Beau Greaves 80.41	5

== April ==
=== Women's Series 9 ===
Women's Series 9 was contested on Saturday 12 April 2025 at the Autotron in Rosmalen, Netherlands.

The event was won by Noa-Lynn van Leuven who defeated Stefanie Lueck 5–0 in the final.

Quarter-finals (best of 9 legs)
Laura Turner 67.60	3
Stefanie Lück 68.40	5
Kirsi Viinikainen 74.51	5
Laura van den Berg 68.21	2
Noa-Lynn van Leuven 88.14	5
Gemma Hayter 80.00	2
Aileen de Graaf 75.73	5
Fallon Sherrock 75.43	4

Semi-finals (best of 9 legs)
Stefanie Lück 87.88	5
Kirsi Viinikainen 73.04	1
Noa-Lynn van Leuven 80.89	5
Aileen de Graaf 75.47	1

Final (best of 9 legs)
Noa-Lynn van Leuven 78.28	5
Stefanie Lück 72.37	0

=== Women's Series 10 ===
Women's Series 10 was contested on Saturday 12 April 2025 at the Autotron in Rosmalen, Netherlands.

The event was won by Noa-Lynn van Leuven who defeated Rhian O'Sullivan 5–1 in the final.

Quarter-finals (best of 9 legs)
Jade Gofford 71.44	1
Noa-Lynn van Leuven 80.57	5
Adriana van Wijgerden-Vermaat 66.75	3
Dana Verhaegen 65.18	5
Rhian O'Sullivan 80.05	5
Fallon Sherrock 80.92	4
Aileen de Graaf 71.80	2
Lorraine Winstanley 72.61	5

Semi-finals (best of 9 legs)
Noa-Lynn van Leuven 77.64	5
Dana Verhaegen 69.46	3
Rhian O'Sullivan 68.32	5
Lorraine Winstanley 72.14	4

Final (best of 9 legs)
Noa-Lynn van Leuven 80.41	5
Rhian O'Sullivan 67.38	1

=== Women's Series 11 ===
Women's Series 11 was contested on Sunday 13 April 2025 at the Autotron in Rosmalen, Netherlands.

The event was won by Fallon Sherrock who defeated Lisa Ashton 5–0 in the final.

Quarter-finals (best of 9 legs)
Shana Van Nieuwenhoven 55.62	1
Kirsi Viinikainen 62.66	5
Lauren Bloomfield 69.36	4
Fallon Sherrock 74.66	5
Gemma Hayter 90.17	2
Lisa Ashton 89.06	5
Kirsty Hutchinson 73.69	2
Robyn Byrne 72.60	5

Semi-finals (best of 9 legs)
Kirsi Viinikainen 75.27	2
Fallon Sherrock 73.75	5
Lisa Ashton 86.38	5
Robyn Byrne 76.72	0

Final (best of 9 legs)
Fallon Sherrock 81.68	5
Lisa Ashton 74.40	0

=== Women's Series 12 ===
Women's Series 12 was contested on Sunday 13 April 2025 at the Autotron in Rosmalen, Netherlands.

The event was won by Beau Greaves who defeated Robyn Byrne 5–0 in the final.

Quarter-finals (best of 9 legs)
Robyn Byrne 67.49	5
Kirsi Viinikainen 65.35	2
Kim Holden 62.31	0
Natalie Gilbert 66.50	5
Stefanie Lück 57.86	0
Fallon Sherrock 66.50	5
Gemma Hayter 80.27	2
Beau Greaves 89.97	5

Semi-finals (best of 9 legs)
Robyn Byrne 73.33	5
Natalie Gilbert 61.38	2
Fallon Sherrock 72.79	3
Beau Greaves 84.55	5

Final (best of 9 legs)
Robyn Byrne 72.13	0
Beau Greaves 100.20	5

== June ==
=== Women's Series 13 ===
Women's Series 13 was contested on Saturday 7 June 2025 at the Marshall Arena in Milton Keynes.

The event was won by Beau Greaves, who defeated Fallon Sherrock 5–2 in the final.

Quarter-finals (best of 9 legs)
Noa-Lynn van Leuven 89.42	3
Beau Greaves 98.62	5
Gemma Hayter 78.64	5
Aurora Fochesato 74.09	3
Lorraine Hyde 67.72	0
Fallon Sherrock 83.50	5
Lorraine Winstanley 74.30	1
Lisa Ashton 76.45	5

Semi-finals (best of 9 legs)
Beau Greaves 88.67	5
Gemma Hayter 82.22	2
Fallon Sherrock 89.80	5
Lisa Ashton 91.42	4

Final (best of 9 legs)
Beau Greaves 89.37	5
Fallon Sherrock 84.42	2

=== Women's Series 14 ===
Women's Series 14 was contested on Saturday 7 June 2025 at the Marshall Arena in Milton Keynes.

The event was won by Beau Greaves who defeated Lorraine Winstanley 5–4 in the final.

Quarter-finals (best of 9 legs)
Gemma Hayter 71.59	5
Carly Chenery 66.35	1
Beau Greaves 84.28	5
Lisa Ashton 67.64	2
Aileen de Graaf 72.71	5
Noa-Lynn van Leuven 79.93	2
Lorraine Winstanley 71.04	5
Fallon Sherrock 78.14	4

Semi-finals (best of 9 legs)
Gemma Hayter 82.48	1
Beau Greaves 89.30	5
Aileen de Graaf 70.36	4
Lorraine Winstanley 71.90	5

Final (best of 9 legs)
Beau Greaves 87.90	5
Lorraine Winstanley 80.12	4

=== Women's Series 15 ===
Women's Series 15 was contested on Sunday 8 June 2025 at the Marshall Arena in Milton Keynes.

The event was won by Beau Greaves, who defeated Rhian O'Sullivan 5–2 in the final.

Quarter-finals (best of 9 legs)
Lauren Bloomfield 69.62	1
Rhian O'Sullivan 75.28	5
Steph Clarke 80.21	5
Denise Cassidy 68.01	2
Beau Greaves 94.31	5
Fallon Sherrock 83.36	2
Aileen de Graaf 76.06	5
Juliane Birchall 61.55	1

Semi-finals (best of 9 legs)
Rhian O'Sullivan 76.72	5
Steph Clarke 73.01	4
Beau Greaves 90.54	5
Aileen de Graaf 63.12	0

Final (best of 9 legs)
Rhian O'Sullivan 75.11	2
Beau Greaves 90.57	5

=== Women's Series 16 ===
Women's Series 16 was contested on Sunday 8 June 2025 at the Marshall Arena in Milton Keynes.

The event was won by Beau Greaves who defeated Lisa Ashton 5–1 in the final, to claim all 4 events.

Quarter-finals (best of 9 legs)
Angela Kirkwood 61.73	1
Beau Greaves 81.87	5
Fallon Sherrock 85.68	5
Trina Gulliver 58.66	1
Lorraine Hyde 70.05	5
Ros Hemmings 69.87	4
Lisa Ashton 79.93	5
Aoife McCormack 74.24	4

Semi-finals (best of 9 legs)
Beau Greaves 99.00	5
Fallon Sherrock 77.64	2
Lorraine Hyde 70.14	2
Lisa Ashton 79.69	5

Final (best of 9 legs)
Beau Greaves 86.88	5
Lisa Ashton 76.88	1

== August ==
=== Women's Series 17 ===
Women's Series 17 was contested on Saturday 23 August 2025 at the Marshall Arena in Milton Keynes. Beau Greaves defeated Fallon Sherrock in the final to take her sixth consecutive title, her eleventh of the season.

Quarter-finals (best of 9 legs)
Fallon Sherrock 85.40	5
Deta Hedman 80.59	0
Noa-Lynn van Leuven 82.77	5
Angela Kirkwood 76.76	4
Gemma Hayter 93.94	5
Trina Gulliver 71.60	0
Aileen de Graaf 74.44	2
Beau Greaves 82.98	5

Semi-finals (best of 9 legs)
Fallon Sherrock 82.39	5
Noa-Lynn van Leuven 80.24	1
Gemma Hayter 86.11	2
Beau Greaves 92.01	5

Final (best of 9 legs)
Fallon Sherrock 91.63	3
Beau Greaves 94.97	5

=== Women's Series 18 ===
Women's Series 18 was contested on Saturday 23 August 2025 at the Marshall Arena in Milton Keynes. Beau Greaves won her second title of the day, defeating Aileen de Graaf in the final to take her seventh consecutive title.

Quarter-finals (best of 9 legs)
(Finland) Maret Liiri 65.36	2
Vicky Pruim 68.25	5
Lisa Ashton 81.57	2
Aileen de Graaf 81.46	5
Beau Greaves 97.85	5
Denise Cassidy 78.52	2
Noa-Lynn van Leuven 93.49	3
Gemma Hayter 91.15	5

Semi-finals (best of 9 legs)
Vicky Pruim 62.35	0
Aileen de Graaf 72.96	5
Beau Greaves 92.69	5
Gemma Hayter 86.32	1

Final (best of 9 legs)
Aileen de Graaf 77.87	2
Beau Greaves 90.54	5

=== Women's Series 19 ===
Women's Series 19 was contested on Sunday 24 August 2025 at the Marshall Arena in Milton Keynes. Beau Greaves defeated Fallon Sherrock 5–1 in the final to take her eighth consecutive title, her thirteenth of the season.

Quarter-finals (best of 9 legs)
Eleanor Cairns 68.79	5
Steph Clarke 66.50	3
Kirsi Viinikainen 83.83	2
Fallon Sherrock 81.22	5
Felicia Blay 65.98	3
Jade Gofford 69.38	5
Beau Greaves 87.35	5
Lisa Ashton 90.23	4

Semi-finals (best of 9 legs)
Eleanor Cairns 67.41	0
Fallon Sherrock 80.81	5
Jade Gofford 80.86	0
Beau Greaves 107.36	5

Final (best of 9 legs)
Fallon Sherrock 88.23	1
Beau Greaves 98.56	5

=== Women's Series 20 ===
Women's Series 20 was contested on Sunday 24 August 2025 at the Marshall Arena in Milton Keynes. Beau Greaves won her second title of the day, defeating Lisa Ashton in the final to take her ninth consecutive title, her fourteenth of the season.

Quarter-finals (best of 9 legs)
Beau Greaves 96.88	5
Rebecca Allen 83.10	2
Rhian O'Sullivan 74.46	4
Aileen de Graaf 78.11	5
Lisa Ashton 80.40	5
Lorraine Hyde 73.94	4
Lauren Bloomfield 67.19	5
Fallon Sherrock 66.90	4

Semi-finals (best of 9 legs)
Beau Greaves 93.82	5
Aileen de Graaf 83.05	4
Lisa Ashton 87.38	5
Lauren Bloomfield 64.82	1

Final (best of 9 legs)
Beau Greaves 77.96	5
Lisa Ashton 81.65	3

== October ==
=== Women's Series 21 ===
Women's Series 21 was contested on Saturday 18 October at the Robin Park Tennis Centre in Wigan. Beau Greaves defeated Fallon Sherrock 5–4 in the final to win her tenth consecutive title and her fifteenth of the season.

Quarter-finals (best of 9 legs)
Lisa Ashton 73.39	0
Gemma Hayter 81.68	5
Noa-Lynn van Leuven 85.01	4
Beau Greaves 86.83	5
Fallon Sherrock 85.24	5
Deta Hedman 77.34	3
Sue Lowther 64.21	5
Leanne Halls 59.87	2

Semi-finals (best of 9 legs)
Gemma Hayter 75.81	1
Beau Greaves 95.78	5
Fallon Sherrock 85.24	5
Sue Lowther 69.40	0

Final (best of 9 legs)
Beau Greaves 99.18	5
Fallon Sherrock 96.16	4

=== Women's Series 22 ===
Women's Series 22 was contested on Saturday 18 October at the Robin Park Tennis Centre in Wigan. Beau Greaves defeated Fallon Sherrock 5–4 in the final to win her eleventh consecutive title and her sixteenth of the season.

Quarter-finals (best of 9 legs)
Beau Greaves 95.13	5
Rhian O'Sullivan 80.24	0
Lisa Ashton 80.94	5
Aurora Fochesato 82.31	4
Fallon Sherrock 80.80	5
Kirsi Viinikainen 78.77	3
Deta Hedman
Noa-Lynn van Leuven	w/o

Semi-finals (best of 9 legs)
Beau Greaves 91.24	5
Lisa Ashton 80.12	1
Fallon Sherrock 79.81	5
Noa-Lynn van Leuven 83.68	2

Final (best of 9 legs)
Beau Greaves 101.98	5
Fallon Sherrock 95.67	4

=== Women's Series 23 ===
Women's Series 23 was contested on Saturday 19 October at the Robin Park Tennis Centre in Wigan. Beau Greaves defeated Gemma Hayter 5–0 in the final to win her twelfth consecutive title and her seventeenth of the season.

Quarter-finals (best of 9 legs)
Beau Greaves 105.41	5
Lisa Ashton 92.94	2
Fallon Sherrock 72.96	5
Rhian O'Sullivan 62.39	0
Angela Kirkwood 74.74	5
Aoife McCormack 67.64	2
Vicky Pruim 74.05	1
Gemma Hayter 82.18	5

Semi-finals (best of 9 legs)
Beau Greaves 84.00	5
Fallon Sherrock 75.44	3
Angela Kirkwood 77.59	4
Gemma Hayter 83.63	5

Final (best of 9 legs)
Beau Greaves 92.78	5
Gemma Hayter 81.85	0

=== Women's Series 24 ===
Women's Series 24 was contested on Saturday 19 October at the Robin Park Tennis Centre in Wigan. Beau Greaves defeated Noa-Lynn van Leuven 5–3 in the final to win her thirteenth consecutive title and her eighteenth of the season.

Quarter-finals (best of 9 legs)
Lauryn Salter 71.94	1
Noa-Lynn van Leuven 79.35	5
Wendy Reinstadtler 72.97	3
Paige Pauling 72.95	5
Aoife McCormack 67.15	1
Beau Greaves 86.97	5
Vicky Pruim 76.66	3
Rhian O'Sullivan 78.54	5

Semi-finals (best of 9 legs)
Noa-Lynn van Leuven 80.81	5
Paige Pauling 56.72	0
Beau Greaves 93.94	5
Rhian O'Sullivan 83.00	0

Final (best of 9 legs)
Noa-Lynn van Leuven 87.08	3
Beau Greaves 100.29	5

== Orders of Merit ==
=== Women's Series Order of Merit ===
2025 Women's Series standings
Rank	Player	Prize money
1	Beau Greaves (Note: Greaves qualified for the World Championship via the Development Tour.)	£37,600
2	Fallon Sherrock	£14,600
3	Lisa Ashton	£11,100
4	Noa-Lynn van Leuven	£9,600
5	Gemma Hayter	£8,500
6	Kirsi Viinikainen	£6,600
7	Robyn Byrne	£5,600
8	Lorraine Winstanley	£5,400
9	Rhian O'Sullivan	£5,000
10	Aileen de Graaf	£4,400

Tournament qualifications through PDC Women's Series
2025 Grand Slam of Darts
2026 PDC World Championship
Women's World Matchplay winner. Direct qualification to 2025 Grand Slam of Darts and 2026 PDC World Championship.
