= Gemma Hayter (darts player) =

English darts player (born 1993)

Personal information
- Born: 3 July 1993 (age 33) Eastleigh, Hampshire, England
- Home town: Gosport, Hampshire, England

Sport
- Sport: Darts
- Playing since: 2009
- Darts: 20g Red Dragon Signature
- Laterality: Right-handed
- Walk-on music: "Show Me Love" by Robin S.

Organisation (see split in darts)
- BDO: 2009; 2015–2016
- PDC: 2024–present
- WDF: 2025–present
- Current world ranking: (WDF W) 5 (17 August 2026)

WDF major events – best performances
- World Masters: Winner (1): 2026

PDC premier events – best performances
- World Championship: Last 128: 2026

Other tournament wins
- Years
British Internationals (team event)	2016
England Classic	2025
England Masters	2025
Isle of Man Open	2026
PDC Women's Series	2024 (×2)

Gemma Hayter (born 3 July 1993) is an English professional darts player who competes in Professional Darts Corporation (PDC) events. She is a two-time winner on the PDC Women's Series, having won two titles during her debut year on the tour in 2024 following an eight-year hiatus from darts. She has also won three titles in the World Darts Federation (WDF): the England Classic and England Masters in 2025, and the Isle of Man Open in 2026. She made her PDC World Darts Championship debut at the 2026 event.

== Career ==
In her early career, Hayter played for youth and senior darts for Hampshire at county level. She participated in the girls' event at the 2009 World Masters, where she was eliminated in the last 16. She was a quarter-finalist at the 2015 BDO Gold Cup, losing 4–1 to eventual champion Fallon Sherrock. She represented England at the 2016 British Internationals and was part of the winning women's team alongside Sherrock, Lisa Ashton, Trina Gulliver, Deta Hedman and Lorraine Winstanley. Hayter decided to quit playing darts in 2016, citing the lack of opportunities in the women's game at the time.

Hayter returned to darts in 2024 and began competing in the Professional Darts Corporation's PDC Women's Series events. She started the season by reaching the semi-finals of the opening event, where she took a 4–2 lead against Beau Greaves before losing 5–4. Following another semi-final result and a quarter-final, Hayter became the 12th player to win a Women's Series event since its launch in 2020, claiming her first title at Women's Series 10 by defeating Rhian O'Sullivan 5–3 in the final. She won a second title at Women's Series 19, beating Mikuru Suzuki 5–1 in the final.

Hayter reached the final in the opening event of the 2025 PDC Women's Series, losing 5–3 to Lisa Ashton. The same weekend, she was the runner-up in Women's Series 4 after losing in a deciding leg to Beau Greaves. Hayter's performances on the Women's Series saw her make her Women's World Matchplay debut at the 2025 event, where she played Fallon Sherrock in the opening round. She came back from 3–0 down to force a deciding leg, but missed a match dart as Sherrock took a 4–3 win. She reached a third 2025 final at Women's Series 23, where she suffered a whitewash loss to Greaves. Hayter finished in fifth place on the 2025 Women's Series rankings, which ensured her qualification for the 2026 PDC World Darts Championship, her PDC World Championship debut. She exited the tournament in the first round after a 3–1 defeat against Josh Rock. Outside of the PDC, she won the 2025 England Masters and England Classic, her first two World Darts Federation (WDF) titles.

In July 2026, Hayter defeated Aurora Fochesato 6–3 in legs to win the 2026 WDF Women's World Masters final to claim her first WDF major title.

== Personal life ==
Originally from Eastleigh in Hampshire, Hayter lives in Gosport, a town opposite the city of Portsmouth. Outside of darts, she is a qualified laboratory technician.

Hayter is friends with world champion Luke Humphries, whom she played darts with at youth level; she has stated that his 2024 PDC World Darts Championship win inspired her to return to competition. Hayter signed with darts manufacturer Red Dragon in 2024.

== World Championship results ==
=== PDC World Championship ===
- 2026: First round (lost to Josh Rock 1–3)

== Performance timeline ==
=== WDF ===
Tournament	2026
WDF Ranked major/platinum women's events
World Masters	W

=== PDC ===
Tournament	2025	2026
PDC Ranked televised events
World Championship	DNQ	1R
PDC Televised women's events
Women's World Matchplay	QF	SF

Performance Table Legend
W	Won the tournament	F	Finalist	SF	Semifinalist	QF	Quarterfinalist	#R; RR; Prel.	Lost in # round Round-robin; Preliminary round	DQ	Disqualified
DNQ	Did not qualify	DNP	Did not participate	WD	Withdrew	NH	Tournament not held	#R; RR; Prel.	Lost in # round Round-robin; Preliminary round	NYF	Not yet founded
