= Women's World Matchplay =

Women's professional darts tournament

Tournament information
- Venue: Winter Gardens
- Location: Blackpool, England
- Established: 2022
- Organisation(s): PDC
- Format: Legs
- Prize fund: £25,000 (2025)
- Month(s) Played: July

Current champion(s)
- (England) Beau Greaves

The Women's World Matchplay is a televised darts tournament organised by the Professional Darts Corporation (PDC) and the only televised PDC event open exclusively to women. Since its inception in 2022, the Women's World Matchplay has been hosted at the Winter Gardens in Blackpool, England, the same venue as the World Matchplay, which is not restricted to players of one gender.

== Format ==
The tournament is a straight knockout tournament featuring eight players. The tournament lineup consists of any female player who holds a PDC Tour Card, along with the highest-ranked players on the Women's World Matchplay Order of Merit, which tracks total prize money earned on the PDC Women's Series over an approximately twelve-month period prior to the event. Matches in the quarter-finals are played over the best of 7 legs, while the semi-finals and final are played over the best of 9 and best of 11 legs respectively. Unlike the World Matchplay, matches do not have to be won by two legs.

== History ==
Following the demise of the British Darts Organisation in 2020, there were few events for women's darts. In response, the PDC established the Women's Series, originally as weekend-long qualifying event as for the PDC World Championship and then as an annual tour from 2021. In 2022, to further expand their presence in the women's game, the PDC announced the founding of the Women's World Matchplay. This became the first televised PDC women's tournament (though the final of the one-off 2010 Women's World Darts Championship was televised, also during the World Matchplay).

The first Women's World Matchplay was won by Fallon Sherrock, who beat Aileen de Graaf 6–3 in a final that had been initially tight before Sherrock was able to pull away. Following the 2022 World Matchplay, Beau Greaves began to play PDC events, winning every post-Matchplay event on the 2022 Women's Series and leading the qualification for the 2023 Women's World Matchplay. Greaves lived up to her top seed status by winning the 2023 tournament, comfortably beating Mikuru Suzuki in the final. At the 2023 tournament, Noa-Lynn van Leuven became the first transgender woman to play in a televised darts tournament, but was unable to win a leg, losing to Greaves 4–0 in the quarter-final.

In 2024, Greaves became the first player to defend the Women's World Matchplay title, averaging 98.75 in the final to comfortably defeat a valiant Sherrock 6–3. However, she could not repeat the feat in 2025, incurring her first defeat at the Winter Gardens in the semi-final to Lisa Ashton. Ashton would go on to win the tournament in a tense final, surviving 11 match darts thrown by her opponent, Fallon Sherrock.

== Finals ==
Year	Winner (average in final)	Score	Runner-up (average in final)	Prize money			Venue
Year	Winner (average in final)	Score	Runner-up (average in final)	Total	Winner	Runner-up	Venue
2022	Fallon Sherrock (82.41)	6–3	Aileen de Graaf (76.30)	£25,000	£10,000	£5,000	Winter Gardens, Blackpool
2023	Beau Greaves (79.85)	6–1	Mikuru Suzuki (72.12)	£25,000	£10,000	£5,000	Winter Gardens, Blackpool
2024	Beau Greaves (98.75)	6–3	Fallon Sherrock (87.60)	£25,000	£10,000	£5,000	Winter Gardens, Blackpool
2025	Lisa Ashton (85.49)	6–5	Fallon Sherrock (89.61)	£25,000	£10,000	£5,000	Winter Gardens, Blackpool
2026	Beau Greaves (88.63)	6–5	Fallon Sherrock (87.84)	£40,000	£15,000	£8,000	Winter Gardens, Blackpool

== Records and statistics ==
Statistics up to and including the 2025 tournament.

Player	Apps.	Debut	W	RU	SF	QF	Highest average
(England) Beau Greaves	3	2023	2	0	1	0	98.75
(England) Fallon Sherrock	4	2022	1	2	0	1	89.61
(England) Lisa Ashton	4	2022	1	0	3	0	85.49
(Japan) Mikuru Suzuki	2	2023	0	1	1	0	92.16
(Netherlands) Aileen de Graaf	2	2022	0	1	0	1	84.13
(Netherlands) Noa-Lynn van Leuven	3	2023	0	0	1	2	78.36
(England) Lorraine Winstanley	2	2022	0	0	1	1	76.93
(Republic of Ireland) Robyn Byrne	2	2023	0	0	1	1	81.68
(Republic of Ireland) Katie Sheldon	2	2022	0	0	0	2	73.78
(Wales) Rhian O'Sullivan	2	2023	0	0	0	2	83.48
(Scotland) Chloe O'Brien	1	2022	0	0	0	1	61.17
(England) Laura Turner	1	2022	0	0	0	1	69.84
(Wales) Rhian Griffiths	1	2022	0	0	0	1	71.26
(Authorised Neutral Athletes) Anastasia Dobromyslova	1	2024	0	0	0	1	73.22
(England) Gemma Hayter	1	2025	0	0	0	1	81.29
(Finland) Kirsi Viinikainen	1	2025	0	0	0	1	73.44
