= 2025 Women's World Matchplay =

2025 Betfred Women's World Matchplay

Tournament information
- Dates: 27 July 2025
- Venue: Winter Gardens
- Location: Blackpool, England
- Organisation(s): Professional Darts Corporation (PDC)
- Format: Legs
- Prize fund: £25,000
- Winner's share: £10,000
- High checkout: 140 Lisa Ashton

Champion(s)
- Lisa Ashton (ENG)

The 2025 Women's World Matchplay (known for sponsorship reasons as the 2025 Betfred Women's World Matchplay) was a women's darts tournament that was held at the Winter Gardens in Blackpool, England on 27 July 2025. It was the fourth staging of the Women's World Matchplay by the Professional Darts Corporation (PDC), taking place in the afternoon before the main tournament's final. The total prize fund was £25,000, with the winner receiving £10,000 and earning qualification for the 2025 Grand Slam of Darts and the 2026 PDC World Darts Championship.

The tournament, sponsored by Betfred, featured the top eight players on the one-year Women's World Matchplay Order of Merit, based on earnings won during the 2024 and 2025 seasons of the PDC Women's Series. Gemma Hayter and Kirsi Viinikainen made their debuts at the event.

Beau Greaves was the defending champion, having defeated Fallon Sherrock 6–3 in the 2024 final. However, she lost 5–3 to Lisa Ashton in the semi-finals. Ashton went on to win the tournament by beating Sherrock 6–5 in the final to win the first Women's World Matchplay of her career. Sherrock missed 11 match darts to win the title—eight to win 6–4, and a further three to win 6–5.

== Overview ==
=== Background ===
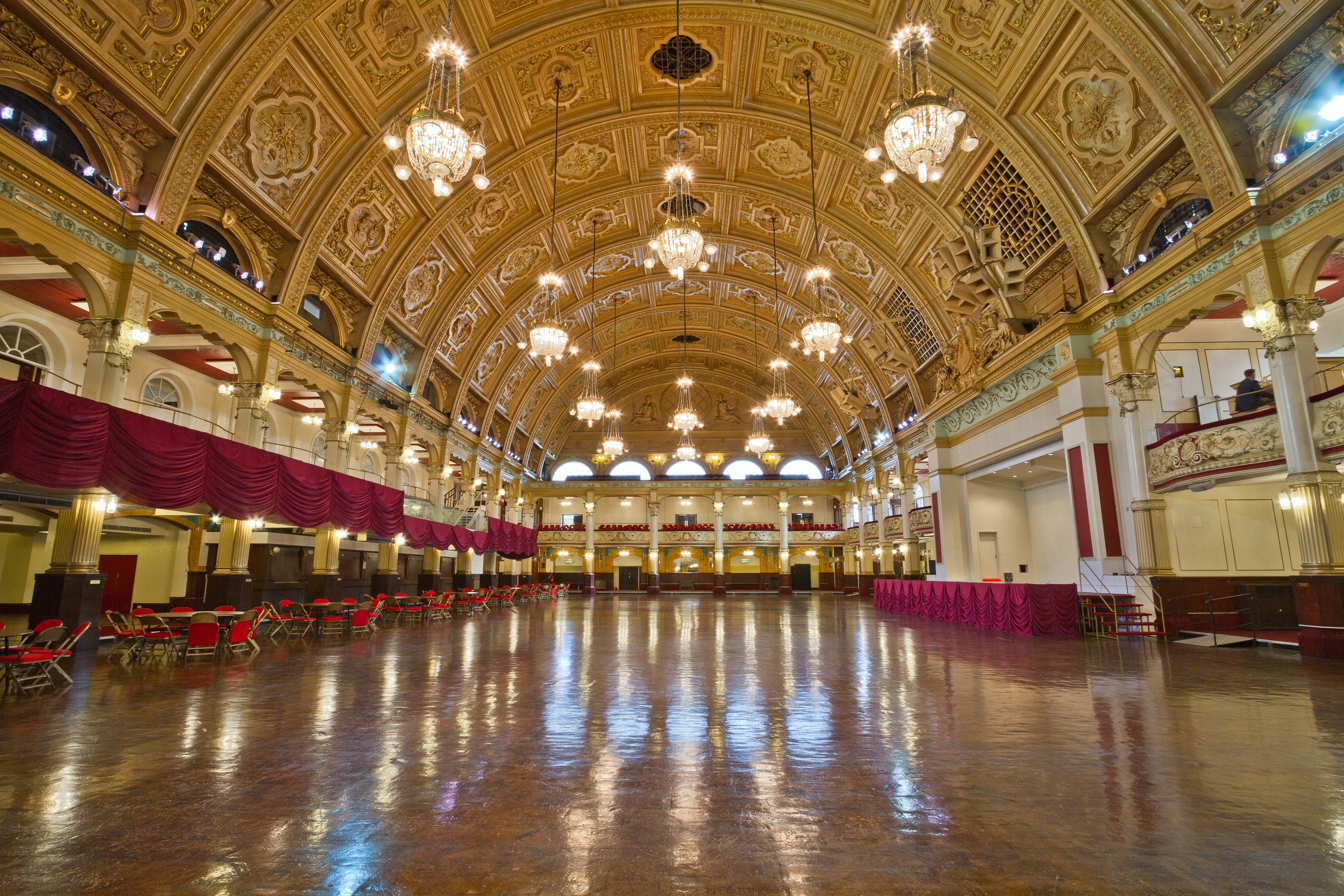
The tournament was held in the Empress Ballroom (pictured in 2016) at the Winter Gardens, Blackpool.

The 2025 Women's World Matchplay was the fourth edition of the tournament to be staged by the Professional Darts Corporation (PDC). It was the first women's event to be fully televised by the organisation, being introduced in 2022 as part of the PDC's expanded commitment to women's darts after the establishment of the PDC Women's Series. The new event's prize fund of £25,000 saw the organisation's full commitment to women's events total £125,000. Fallon Sherrock, the first female player to win a match at the PDC World Darts Championship, won the inaugural edition by defeating Aileen de Graaf 6–3 in the final. This granted her qualification to the 2022 Grand Slam of Darts, although she was later granted a place at the World Championship as Women's World Matchplay champion.

The 2025 edition took place on the afternoon of 27 July 2025 in the Empress Ballroom at the Winter Gardens in Blackpool, England. British bookmaker Betfred continued its sponsorship of the event, extending its partnership with the PDC to sponsor the main tournament and the women's equivalent until 2030. Beau Greaves entered the tournament as defending champion after defeating Fallon Sherrock 6–3 in the 2024 final to win her second consecutive title.

=== Format ===
The eight-player field was seeded into a tournament bracket based on the Women's World Matchplay Order of Merit. All matches were in leg play format, with the number of legs required to win increasing as the tournament progressed:

- Quarter-finals: Best of seven legs
- Semi-finals: Best of nine legs
- Final: Best of eleven legs

=== Prize money ===
The total prize fund remained at £25,000, with the winner receiving £10,000.

Position (no. of players)		Prize money (Total: £25,000)
Winner	(1)	£10,000
Runner-up	(1)	£5,000
Semi-finalists	(2)	£2,500
Quarter-finalists	(4)	£1,250

=== Broadcasts ===
The tournament was broadcast on Sky Sports in the United Kingdom and Ireland, as well as on the PDC's broadcasting partners which include Viaplay and DAZN. It was also available on the PDC's streaming service, PDCTV, to international subscribers.

== Qualifiers ==
2025 Women's World Matchplay Raceafter 24/24 events(Cut-off: 9 June, 2025)
Rank	Player	Earnings
1	Beau Greaves	£33,800
2	Noa-Lynn van Leuven	£16,200
3	Fallon Sherrock	£15,400
4	Lisa Ashton	£11,400
5	Robyn Byrne	£9,400
6	Gemma Hayter	£9,200
7	Lorraine Winstanley	£7,900
8	Kirsi Viinikainen	£7,200
9	Aileen de Graaf	£6,900
10	Rhian O'Sullivan	£5,900

The eight qualifiers for the tournament were the top eight players on the Women's World Matchplay Order of Merit – a one-year ranking based on earnings won over 28 events across the 2024 and 2025 seasons of the PDC Women's Series since July 2024. Defending champion Beau Greaves was the top seed, winning ten titles – including each of the last five – during the qualification period. Gemma Hayter and Kirsi Viinikainen both made their debut at the event.

Player	Appearance in Women's World Matchplay	Previous best performance
Beau Greaves	3rd	Winner (2023, 2024)
Noa-Lynn van Leuven	3rd	Quarter-finals (2023, 2024)
Fallon Sherrock	4th	Winner (2022)
Lisa Ashton	4th	Semi-finals (2022, 2023, 2024)
Robyn Byrne	2nd	Semi-finals (2023)
Gemma Hayter	Debut	DNQ
Lorraine Winstanley	2nd	Semi-finals (2022)
Kirsi Viinikainen	Debut	DNQ

The qualifiers were:

1. Beau Greaves (semi-finals)
2. Noa-Lynn van Leuven (semi-finals)
3. Fallon Sherrock (runner-up)
4. Lisa Ashton (champion)
5. Robyn Byrne (quarter-finals)
6. Gemma Hayter (quarter-finals)
7. Lorraine Winstanley (quarter-finals)
8. Kirsi Viinikainen (quarter-finals)

== Summary ==
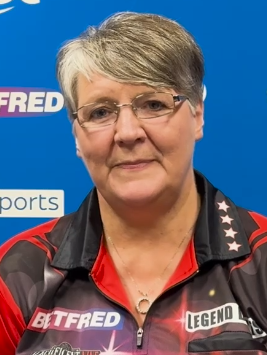
Lisa Ashton (pictured) won the tournament for the first time.

=== Quarter-finals ===
Defending champion Beau Greaves began her pursuit for a third World Matchplay title by defeating Finnish debutant Kirsi Viinikainen 4–1 with a three-dart average of 96.12. Four-time women's world champion Lisa Ashton beat Ireland's Robyn Byrne 4–2, while Noa-Lynn van Leuven achieved her first win at the event in a 4–0 victory over Lorraine Winstanley. 2022 winner Fallon Sherrock completed the semi-final lineup, winning a deciding leg against debutant Gemma Hayter; Sherrock initially led 3–0 but Hayter won the next three legs to force a decider, before missing a match dart to seal the comeback.

=== Semi-finals ===
Ashton, who previously lost at the semi-final stage in the last three editions of the tournament, produced a shock victory by eliminating pre-tournament favourite Greaves in a 5–3 upset. The match included a 140 checkout from Ashton, which she hit in the fourth leg after Greaves missed eight darts at double. Greaves ended the contest with three out of 19 attempts at double hit, with Ashton converting half of her own. Sherrock found herself in another deciding leg in the second semi-final after Van Leuven tied the match at 4–4 with a 116 checkout. Both players missed shots to advance to the final – five from Sherrock and four from Van Leuven – but Sherrock eventually pinned double 1 to prevail 5–4.

=== Final ===
Third seed Sherrock contested the final against fifth seed Ashton. The two previously met in the 2015 BDO World Darts Championship final, where Ashton was victorious. Sherrock was competing in her third World Matchplay final in four appearances, while Ashton featured in her first final. Ashton won the opening leg with an 85 checkout and took a 2–0 lead through a break of throw. Sherrock overturned her deficit with an 86 finish to go 3–2 in front. Ashton retook her lead but Sherrock won the next two legs to go one away from victory. Eight missed match darts from Sherrock in the tenth leg allowed Ashton to pin double 10 and bring the final to a deciding leg – Sherrock's third of the tournament. Ashton hit a maximum to take control but Sherrock managed a 165 set-up shot to leave 36 for the match. However, Sherrock missed another three darts at double, bringing her total amount of championship darts to 11, which left Ashton to hit double 20 to win 6–5. She claimed the World Matchplay title for the first time and became the third player to win the tournament after Sherrock and Greaves. She also earned qualification for the 2025 Grand Slam of Darts and the 2026 PDC World Darts Championship. In her post-match interview, Ashton thanked the crowd for their support and expressed that she thought the final was a "great advert for ladies' darts". She proclaimed: "I never gave up and I've finally done it!" Sherrock stated that she was "quite proud" of herself despite the loss, adding: "I think I've played better here than I have in the last few months, so whatever I'm doing is working."

== Draw ==
The draw was confirmed following Event 16 of the 2025 PDC Women's Series. Numbers to the left of players' names show the seedings for the tournament. The figures to the right of a player's name state their three-dart average in a match. Players in bold denote match winners.

**Quarter-finals** (best of 7 legs); 27 July
**1**	**Beau Greaves 96.12**	**4**
8	Kirsi Viinikainen 73.44	1
**4**	**Lisa Ashton 75.86**	**4**
5	Robyn Byrne 64.84	2
**2**	**Noa-Lynn van Leuven 75.15**	**4**
7	Lorraine Winstanley 65.50	0
**3**	**Fallon Sherrock 84.59**	**4**
6	Gemma Hayter 81.29	3

**Semi-finals** (best of 9 legs); 27 July
1	Beau Greaves 85.56	3
**4**	**Lisa Ashton 83.15**	**5**
2	Noa-Lynn van Leuven 76.62	4
**3**	**Fallon Sherrock 74.80**	**5**

**Final** (best of 11 legs); 27 July
**4**	**Lisa Ashton 85.49**	**6**
3	Fallon Sherrock 89.61	5
