= 2023 PDC Women's Series =

Series of darts tournaments

The 2023 PDC Women's Series consisted of 24 darts tournaments on the 2023 PDC Pro Tour.

The top 8 ranked players, with earnings from the last 8 2022 PDC Women's Series events and the first 12 events of the 2023 series counting towards the Women's Matchplay Race Order of Merit, qualified for the 2023 Women's World Matchplay in Blackpool. The top 2 players, at the end of event 24, on the Women's Series Order of Merit who were not already qualified for the 2024 PDC World Darts Championship, earned a spot there. Due to Greaves winning the Women's World Matchplay, Order of Merit runner-up Fallon Sherrock also qualified for the 2023 Grand Slam of Darts as well as the 2024 PDC World Championship, while third–place Mikuru Suzuki took a place at Ally Pally.

Beau Greaves chose not to participate at the Alexandra Palace, instead going to the 2023 WDF World Darts Championship at Lakeside, following a ruling by the PDC which did not allow players to compete in both World Championships in the same year.

2023 Women's Series ranking
Rank	Player	Earnings
1	Beau Greaves (Note: Qualified for 2023 Grand Slam of Darts via another method.) (Note: Decided to play at 2023 WDF World Darts Championship after PDC didn't permit to play at two World Championships in one year.)	£29,400
2	Fallon Sherrock	£17,200
3	Mikuru Suzuki	£13,600
4	Rhian O'Sullivan	£9,100
5	Lisa Ashton	£8,950
6	Robyn Byrne	£6,900
7	Aileen de Graaf	£5,400
8	Noa-Lynn van Leuven	£5,300
9	Natalie Gilbert	£4,700
10	Anastasia Dobromyslova (Note: Anastasia Dobromyslova has competed under a neutral designation since the 2022 Russian invasion of Ukraine.)	£4,300

Final standings of the 2023 Women's World Matchplay Race(Cut-off: June 26, 2023)
Rank	Player	Earnings
1	Beau Greaves	£24,300
2	Mikuru Suzuki	£12,100
3	Fallon Sherrock	£7,750
4	Robyn Byrne	£6,150
5	Rhian O'Sullivan	£5,400
6	Lisa Ashton	£5,200
7	Aileen de Graaf	£4,400
8	Noa-Lynn van Leuven	£3,750
9	Lorraine Winstanley	£3,150
10	Priscilla Steenbergen	£2,700

== Prize money ==
On 21 November 2022, it was announced that the prize money for the Women's Series will be doubled in 2023, with each event now having a prize fund of £10,000.

This is how the prize money is divided:

Stage (no. of players)		Prize money (Total: £10,000)
Winner	(1)	£2,000
Runner-up	(1)	£1,000
Semi-finalists	(2)	£500
Quarter-finalists	(4)	£300
Last 16	(8)	£200
Last 32	(16)	£100
Last 64	(32)	£50 (Note: Last 64 prize money will only be paid out, if a minimum of 128 participants take part in a Women's Series event.)

== February ==
=== Women's Series 1 ===
Women's Series 1 was contested on Saturday 25 February 2023 at the Leicester Arena in Leicester.

The event was won by Beau Greaves, who won her 9th consecutive title.

Quarter-finals (best of 7 legs)
Mikuru Suzuki 76.10	4
Corrine Hammond 74.62	2
Rhian O'Sullivan 72.43	4
Zoe Jones 60.30	0
Adriana van Wijgerden-Vermaat 59.89	4
Roz Bulmer 57.81	3
Fallon Sherrock 89.00	1
Beau Greaves 87.97	4

Semi-finals (best of 9 legs)
Mikuru Suzuki 78.74	5
Rhian O'Sullivan 76.47	1
Adriana van Wijgerden-Vermaat 69.27	0
Beau Greaves 91.67	5

Final (best of 9 legs)
Mikuru Suzuki 86.82	3
Beau Greaves 94.34	5

=== Women's Series 2 ===
Women's Series 2 was contested on Saturday 25 February 2023 at the Leicester Arena in Leicester.

The event was won by Beau Greaves, who won her 10th consecutive title.

Quarter-finals (best of 9 legs)
Lisa Ashton 90.54	5
Anastasia Dobromyslova (Note: Dobromyslova has competed under a neutral flag since the 2022 Russian invasion of Ukraine.) (80.11)	0
Kim Holden 71.95	5
Angela Kirkwood 67.69	1
Rhian O'Sullivan 85.54	2
Mikuru Suzuki 87.08	5
Beau Greaves 86.97	5
Corrine Hammond 75.00	1

Semi-finals (best of 9 legs)
Lisa Ashton 76.12	4
Kim Holden 76.18	5
Mikuru Suzuki 84.92	1
Beau Greaves 90.06	5

Final (best of 9 legs)
Kim Holden 65.72	0
Beau Greaves 81.68	5

=== Women's Series 3 ===
Women's Series 3 was contested on Sunday 26 February 2023 at the Leicester Arena in Leicester.

The event was won by Mikuru Suzuki.

Quarter-finals (best of 9 legs)
Mikuru Suzuki 81.97	5
Beau Greaves 87.79	4
Kirsi Viinikainen 57.78	0
Trina Gulliver 66.50	5
Lorraine Winstanley 77.16	5
Priscilla Steenbergen 74.21	2
Rhian O'Sullivan 73.86	5
Noa-Lynn van Leuven 72.48	4

Semi-finals (best of 9 legs)
Mikuru Suzuki 83.50	5
Trina Gulliver 67.75	0
Lorraine Winstanley 67.53	1
Rhian O'Sullivan 80.40	5

Final (best of 9 legs)
Mikuru Suzuki 84.62	5
Rhian O'Sullivan 79.43	1

=== Women's Series 4 ===
Women's Series 4 was contested on Sunday 26 February 2023 at the Leicester Arena in Leicester.

The event was won by Beau Greaves.

Quarter-finals (best of 9 legs)
Robyn Byrne 68.72	5
Noa-Lynn van Leuven 69.80	4
Lorraine Winstanley 73.42	2
Kim Holden 76.02	5
Kirsty Hutchinson 72.33	1
Beau Greaves 86.97	5
Mikuru Suzuki 76.12	5
Lindsey Ashton 64.68	1

Semi-finals (best of 9 legs)
Robyn Byrne 67.18	5
Kim Holden 63.63	2
Beau Greaves 88.50	5
Mikuru Suzuki 90.09	4

Final (best of 9 legs)
Robyn Byrne 74.38	0
Beau Greaves 89.46	5

== May ==
=== Women's Series 5 ===
Women's Series 5 was contested on Saturday 13 May 2023 at the Arena MK in Milton Keynes.

The event was won by Beau Greaves, who won her 12th title, defeating Fallon Sherrock 5–2 in the final.

Quarter-finals (best of 9 legs)
Fallon Sherrock 91.29	5
Robyn Byrne 87.17	1
Aoife McCormack 73.19	1
Kirsty Hutchinson 81.39	5
Lisa Ashton 77.47	5
Lindsey Ashton 74.68	0
Anca Zijlstra 72.88	0
Beau Greaves 101.88	5

Semi-finals (best of 9 legs)
Fallon Sherrock 91.75	5
Kirsty Hutchinson 79.06	1
Lisa Ashton 79.37	2
Beau Greaves 81.32	5

Final (best of 9 legs)
Fallon Sherrock 93.48	2
Beau Greaves 94.75	5

=== Women's Series 6 ===
Women's Series 6 was contested on Saturday 13 May 2023 at the Arena MK in Milton Keynes.

The event was won by Rhian O'Sullivan.

Quarter-finals (best of 9 legs)
Beau Greaves 95.94	5
Fallon Sherrock 82.21	1
Aileen de Graaf 74.87	5
Michelle Andrews 69.80	1
Rhian O'Sullivan 75.91	5
Anca Zijlstra 72.25	0
Mikuru Suzuki 77.65	2
Trina Gulliver 75.09	5

Semi-finals (best of 9 legs)
Beau Greaves 88.13	5
Aileen de Graaf 74.81	1
Rhian O'Sullivan 79.05	5
Trina Gulliver 71.96	3

Final (best of 9 legs)
Beau Greaves 80.21	3
Rhian O'Sullivan 84.53	5

=== Women's Series 7 ===
Women's Series 7 was contested on Sunday 14 May 2023 at the Arena MK in Milton Keynes.

The event was won by Robyn Byrne.

Quarter-finals (best of 9 legs)
Laura Turner 73.69	5
Beau Greaves 75.14	4
Almudena Fajardo 78.04	5
Katie Sheldon 69.80	3
Kirsi Viinikainen 67.51	3
Robyn Byrne 71.05	5
Fallon Sherrock 92.85	3
Lisa Ashton 87.36	5

Semi-finals (best of 9 legs)
Laura Turner 69.61	5
Almudena Fajardo 68.55	4
Robyn Byrne 80.46	5
Lisa Ashton 79.57	3

Final (best of 9 legs)
Laura Turner 69.44	1
Robyn Byrne 78.88	5

=== Women's Series 8 ===
Women's Series 8 was contested on Sunday 14 May 2023 at the Arena MK in Milton Keynes.

The event was won by Mikuru Suzuki.

Quarter-finals (best of 9 legs)
Rachel Brooks 65.03	0
Beau Greaves 79.95	5
Angela Kirkwood 72.87	2
Noa-Lynn van Leuven 78.12	5
Robyn Byrne 72.04	0
Fallon Sherrock 93.94	5
Mikuru Suzuki 94.48	5
Almudena Fajardo 78.03	1

Semi-finals (best of 9 legs)
Beau Greaves 72.82	3
Noa-Lynn van Leuven 71.35	5
Fallon Sherrock 94.25	2
Mikuru Suzuki 98.91	5

Final (best of 9 legs)
Noa-Lynn van Leuven 76.45	3
Mikuru Suzuki 78.10	5

== June ==
=== Women's Series 9 ===
Women's Series 9 was contested on Saturday 24 June 2023 at Halle 39 in Hildesheim.

The event was won by Beau Greaves, who won her 13th title, defeating Mikuru Suzuki 5–1 in the final.

Quarter-finals (best of 9 legs)
Laura Turner 73.66	1
Mikuru Suzuki 85.31	5
Fallon Sherrock 85.15	4
Lisa Ashton 86.10	5
Beau Greaves 86.38	5
Crissy Manley 60.00	0
Lorraine Hyde 70.18	2
Corrine Hammond 71.83	5

Semi-finals (best of 9 legs)
Mikuru Suzuki 87.38	5
Lisa Ashton 80.85	0
Beau Greaves 73.34	5
Corrine Hammond 72.72	1

Final (best of 9 legs)
Mikuru Suzuki 84.47	1
Beau Greaves 95.94	5

=== Women's Series 10 ===
Women's Series 10 was contested on Saturday 24 June 2023 at Halle 39 in Hildesheim.

The event was won by Fallon Sherrock, who defeated Robyn Byrne 5–2 in the final.

Quarter-finals (best of 9 legs)
Aileen de Graaf 84.55	5
Priscilla Steenbergen 68.34	1
Natalie Gilbert 63.51	3
Fallon Sherrock 70.86	5
Mikuru Suzuki 77.89	5
Evonne Taylor 73.34	2
Robyn Byrne 68.45	5
Paula Jacklin 65.73	2

Semi-finals (best of 9 legs)
Aileen de Graaf 79.59	2
Fallon Sherrock 81.05	5
Mikuru Suzuki 83.39	4
Robyn Byrne 81.00	5

Final (best of 9 legs)
Fallon Sherrock 88.95	5
Robyn Byrne 81.82	2

=== Women's Series 11 ===
Women's Series 11 was contested on Sunday 25 June 2023 at Halle 39 in Hildesheim.

The event was won by Beau Greaves, who won her 14th title, defeating Fallon Sherrock 5–4 in the final.

Quarter-finals (best of 9 legs)
Kirsi Viinikainen 95.09	5
Mikuru Suzuki 89.32	1
Aurora Fochesato 69.49	1
Beau Greaves 75.29	5
Aileen de Graaf 80.53	5
Lorraine Winstanley 76.03	2
Lisa Ashton 78.77	3
Fallon Sherrock 80.67	5

Semi-finals (best of 9 legs)
Kirsi Viinikainen 86.02	2
Beau Greaves 85.19	5
Aileen de Graaf 74.70	1
Fallon Sherrock 85.27	5

Final (best of 9 legs)
Beau Greaves 89.05	5
Fallon Sherrock 90.92	4

=== Women's Series 12 ===
Women's Series 12 was contested on Sunday 25 June 2023 at Halle 39 in Hildesheim.

The event was won by Beau Greaves, who won her 15th title, defeating Noa-Lynn van Leuven 5–0 in the final.

Quarter-finals (best of 9 legs)
Beau Greaves 83.89	5
Fallon Sherrock 83.93	3
Mikuru Suzuki 79.46	5
Robyn Byrne 78.55	3
Noa-Lynn van Leuven 73.48	5
Rhian O'Sullivan 68.33	2
Priscilla Steenbergen 64.56	5
Lorraine Hyde 62.51	2

Semi-finals (best of 9 legs)
Beau Greaves 81.04	5
Mikuru Suzuki 77.57	4
Noa-Lynn van Leuven 73.73	5
Priscilla Steenbergen 67.58	2

Final (best of 9 legs)
Beau Greaves 104.38	5
Noa-Lynn van Leuven 81.77	0

== July ==
=== Women's Series 13 ===
Women's Series 13 was contested on Saturday 29 July 2023 at the Arena MK in Milton Keynes.

The event was won by Beau Greaves, who defeated Lisa Ashton 5–2 in the final, to claim a record equalling 16th title.

Quarter-finals (best of 9 legs)
Priscilla Steenbergen 74.70	4
Aoife McCormack 72.94	5
Beau Greaves 99.33	5
Fallon Sherrock 90.47	2
Aileen de Graaf 85.43	2
Lisa Ashton 92.94	5
Rhian O'Sullivan 75.02	5
Corrine Hammond 72.40	2

Semi-finals (best of 9 legs)
Aoife McCormack 73.89	2
Beau Greaves 79.87	5
Lisa Ashton 92.31	5
Rhian O'Sullivan 78.65	1

Final (best of 9 legs)
Beau Greaves 93.31	5
Lisa Ashton 90.76	2

=== Women's Series 14 ===
Women's Series 14 was contested on Saturday 29 July 2023 at the Arena MK in Milton Keynes.

The event was won by Beau Greaves, who defeated Fallon Sherrock 5–1 in the final, to claim a record breaking 17th title.

Quarter-finals (best of 9 legs)
Rhian O'Sullivan 81.83	5
Katie Sheldon 68.47	1
Beau Greaves 76.18	5
Samantha Kirton 72.49	2
Trina Gulliver 68.78	1
Lisa Ashton 83.36	5
Fallon Sherrock 89.45	5
Laura Turner 76.92	2

Semi-finals (best of 9 legs)
Rhian O'Sullivan 84.74	1
Beau Greaves 88.91	5
Lisa Ashton 90.93	3
Fallon Sherrock 90.90	5

Final (best of 9 legs)
Beau Greaves 104.96	5
Fallon Sherrock 83.89	1

=== Women's Series 15 ===
Women's Series 15 was contested on Sunday 30 July 2023 at the Arena MK in Milton Keynes.

The event was won by Beau Greaves, who defeated Mikuru Suzuki 5–0 in the final.

Quarter-finals (best of 9 legs)
Vicky Pruim 78.38	4
Rhian O'Sullivan 81.73	5
Noa-Lynn van Leuven 72.95	3
Mikuru Suzuki 76.80	5
Robyn Byrne 80.20	3
Beau Greaves 85.30	5
Lorraine Hyde 74.52	1
Lisa Ashton 87.75	5

Semi-finals (best of 9 legs)
Rhian O'Sullivan 86.57	3
Mikuru Suzuki 82.34	5
Beau Greaves 100.86	5
Lisa Ashton 96.71	2

Final (best of 9 legs)
Mikuru Suzuki 74.77	0
Beau Greaves 91.65	5

=== Women's Series 16 ===
Women's Series 16 was contested on Sunday 30 July 2023 at the Arena MK in Milton Keynes.

The event was won by Beau Greaves, who won 7 consecutive titles, and a record 19th title, defeating Mikuru Suzuki 5–4 in the final.

Quarter-finals (best of 9 legs)
Noa-Lynn van Leuven 80.08	2
Beau Greaves 84.88	5
Aileen de Graaf 77.33	5
Priscilla Steenbergen 76.56	4
Lisa Ashton 86.84	4
Anastasia Dobromyslova (Note: Dobromyslova has competed under a neutral flag since the 2022 Russian invasion of Ukraine.) 77.70	5
Mikuru Suzuki 70.23	5
Rose Mort 64.31	0

Semi-finals (best of 9 legs)
Beau Greaves 86.35	5
Aileen de Graaf 81.31	3
Mikuru Suzuki 76.68	5
Anastasia Dobromyslova 68.56	0

Final (best of 9 legs)
Beau Greaves 85.02	5
Mikuru Suzuki 75.01	4

== September ==
=== Women's Series 17 ===
Women's Series 17 was contested on Saturday 16 September 2023 at the Robin Park Tennis Centre in Wigan.

The event was won by Mikuru Suzuki.

Quarter-finals (best of 9 legs)
Natalie Gilbert 62.86	1
Mikuru Suzuki 79.45	5
Adriana van Wijgerden-Vermaat 65.07	3
Maria O'Brien 69.70	5
Lisa Ashton 87.09	5
Noa-Lynn van Leuven 77.35	2
Fallon Sherrock 83.03	4
Rhian O'Sullivan 82.27	5

Semi-finals (best of 9 legs)
Mikuru Suzuki 100.65	5
Maria O'Brien 83.26	1
Lisa Ashton 82.06	5
Rhian O'Sullivan 75.64	2

Final (best of 9 legs)
Mikuru Suzuki 81.93	5
Lisa Ashton 72.73	2

=== Women's Series 18 ===
Women's Series 18 was contested on Saturday 16 September 2023 at the Robin Park Tennis Centre in Wigan.

The event was won by Lisa Ashton.

Quarter-finals (best of 9 legs)
Anastasia Dobromyslova (Note: Dobromyslova has competed under a neutral flag since the 2022 Russian invasion of Ukraine.) 73.15	5
Laura Turner 77.32	4
Rhian O'Sullivan 67.68	1
Aileen de Graaf 75.68	5
Beau Greaves 84.59	2
Lisa Ashton 87.63	5
Rowena Sidley 70.82	1
Fallon Sherrock 77.90	5

Semi-finals (best of 9 legs)
Anastasia Dobromyslova 94.22	5
Aileen de Graaf 75.43	1
Lisa Ashton 87.06	5
Fallon Sherrock 90.06	4

Final (best of 9 legs)
Anastasia Dobromyslova 68.46	0
Lisa Ashton 93.94	5

=== Women's Series 19 ===
Women's Series 19 was contested on Sunday 17 September 2023 at the Robin Park Tennis Centre in Wigan.

The event was won by Beau Greaves.

Quarter-finals (best of 9 legs)
Kim Holden 72.11	3
Lorraine Hyde 71.12	5
Rhian O'Sullivan 66.16	3
Anastasia Dobromyslova 65.51	5
Beau Greaves 81.68	5
Natalie Gilbert 61.03	0
Mikuru Suzuki 82.99	4
Noa-Lynn van Leuven 86.09	5

Semi-finals (best of 9 legs)
Lorraine Hyde 75.00	1
Anastasia Dobromyslova (Note: Dobromyslova has competed under a neutral flag since the 2022 Russian invasion of Ukraine.) 75.54	5
Beau Greaves 84.02	5
Noa-Lynn van Leuven 83.43	4

Final (best of 9 legs)
Anastasia Dobromyslova 75.54	2
Beau Greaves 84.02	5

=== Women's Series 20 ===
Women's Series 20 was contested on Sunday 17 September 2023 at the Robin Park Tennis Centre in Wigan.

The event was won by Fallon Sherrock, who defeated Beau Greaves, 5–4 in the final.

Quarter-finals (best of 9 legs)
Beau Greaves 86.63	5
Kirsty Hutchinson 83.91	3
Leanne Topper 65.91	0
Lorraine Hyde 76.68	5
Rhian O'Sullivan 81.15	5
Lisa Ashton 79.17	2
Fallon Sherrock 82.83	5
Kirsi Viinikainen 76.54	2

Semi-finals (best of 9 legs)
Beau Greaves 77.47	5
Lorraine Hyde 69.38	2
Rhian O'Sullivan 73.98	1
Fallon Sherrock 84.74	5

Final (best of 9 legs)
Beau Greaves 92.67	4
Fallon Sherrock 84.78	5

== October ==
=== Women's Series 21 ===
Women's Series 21 was contested on Saturday 14 October 2023 at the Robin Park Tennis Centre in Wigan. The event was won by Fallon Sherrock, who defeated Vicky Pruim 5–0 in the final.

Quarter-finals (best of 9 legs)
Kirsi Viinikainen 74.41	5
Aoife McCormack 67.59	0
Fallon Sherrock 83.72	5
Lorraine Hyde 83.56	3
Vicky Pruim 79.45	5
Beau Greaves 79.98	2
Laura Turner 71.39	5
Steph Clarke 72.73	4

Semi-finals (best of 9 legs)
Kirsi Viinikainen 70.00	0
Fallon Sherrock 90.54	5
Vicky Pruim 72.74	5
Laura Turner 70.73	1

Final (best of 9 legs)
Fallon Sherrock 95.13	5
Vicky Pruim 80.40	0

=== Women's Series 22 ===
Women's Series 22 was contested on Saturday 14 October 2023 at the Robin Park Tennis Centre in Wigan. The event was won by Fallon Sherrock, defeating Aoife McCormack 5–0 in the final.

Quarter-finals (best of 9 legs)
Sara Mortimer 67.10	4
Aoife McCormack 73.41	5
Anastasia Dobromyslova 68.00	5
Corrine Hammond 61.95	3
Fallon Sherrock 81.33	5
Kirsty Hutchinson 73.58	2
Beau Greaves 86.75	5
Deta Hedman 74.17	3

Semi-finals (best of 9 legs)
Aoife McCormack 77.38	5
Anastasia Dobromyslova (Note: Dobromyslova has competed under a neutral flag since the 2022 Russian invasion of Ukraine.) 76.06	4
Fallon Sherrock 81.37	5
Beau Greaves 83.10	4

Final (best of 9 legs)
Fallon Sherrock 82.58	5
Aoife McCormack 79.11	0

=== Women's Series 23 ===
Women's Series 23 was contested on Sunday 15 October 2023 at the Robin Park Tennis Centre in Wigan. Fallon Sherrock won her fourth consecutive title by defeating Rhian O'Sullivan 5–3 in the final. This win confirmed Sherrock's qualification for the 2023 Grand Slam of Darts.

Quarter-finals (best of 9 legs)
Angela Kirkwood 76.29	5
Rose Mort 72.51	3
Fallon Sherrock 90.22	5
Beau Greaves 85.17	3
Kirsi Viinikainen 76.66	0
Rhian O'Sullivan 82.58	5
Roos van der Velde 66.53	2
Kirsty Hutchinson 68.34	5

Semi-finals (best of 9 legs)
Angela Kirkwood 76.51	1
Fallon Sherrock 84.14	5
Rhian O'Sullivan 80.25	5
Kirsty Hutchinson 77.45	2

Final (best of 9 legs)
Fallon Sherrock 88.30	5
Rhian O'Sullivan 82.85	3

=== Women's Series 24 ===
Women's Series 24 was contested on Sunday 15 October 2023 at the Robin Park Tennis Centre in Wigan. The event was won by Natalie Gilbert, defeating Lorraine Winstanley 5–3 in the final.

Quarter-finals (best of 9 legs)
Robyn Byrne 85.97	3
Kirsty Hutchinson 82.49	5
Noa-Lynn van Leuven 68.73	3
Natalie Gilbert 69.61	5
Vicky Pruim 71.55	2
Beau Greaves 81.77	5
Lorraine Winstanley 75.13	5
Casey Gallagher 68.57	2

Semi-finals (best of 9 legs)
Kirsty Hutchinson 84.08	4
Natalie Gilbert 79.98	5
Beau Greaves 88.31	3
Lorraine Winstanley 82.20	5

Final (best of 9 legs)
Natalie Gilbert 74.61	5
Lorraine Winstanley 71.63	3
