= England Masters =

Tournament information
- Venue: Bunn Leisure Holiday Centre
- Location: Selsey
- Country: England
- Established: 2009
- Organisation(s): World Darts Federation (WDF), Silver
- Format: Legs
- Prize fund: £4,640
- Month(s) Played: September

Current champion(s)
- Neil Duff (men's) (England) Gemma Hayter (women's)

The England Masters is a darts tournament that has been held annually since 2009.

== List of winners ==
=== Men's ===
Year	Champion (average in final)	Score	Runner-up (average in final)	Total Prize Money	Champion	Runner-up
2009	(England) Brian Woods	6–3	(England) Dave Chisnall	£4,140	£1,200	£600
2010	(England) John Walton (92.22)	5–3	(England) Dean Winstanley (91.86)	£4,140	£1,200	£600
2011	(England) John Walton (90.03) (2)	5–3	(Scotland) Ross Montgomery (87.86)	£4,140	£2,000	£600
2012	(Northern Ireland) Daryl Gurney	5–1	(England) Gary Robson	£4,140	£2,000	£600
2013	(England) Stephen Bunting	6–5	(England) Paul Jennings	£4,140	£2,000	£600
2014	(England) Gary Robson	7–3	(England) Glen Durrant	£4,140	£2,000	£600
2015	(England) Scott Mitchell	6–5	(Wales) Dean Reynolds	£3,300	£1,000	£500
2016	(England) Glen Durrant	6–3	(Scotland) Ross Montgomery			
2017	(Belgium) Andy Baetens	5–2	(Wales) Jamie Hughes			
2018	(Wales) Jim Williams	5–1	(Scotland) Ross Montgomery			
2019	(England) Scott Mitchell (2)	5–2	(Netherlands) Richard Veenstra			
2024	(England) Reece Colley	5–4	(Scotland) Ryan Hogarth	£5,040	£1,500	£700
2025	Neil Duff 84.37	5–3	(England) Harry Lane 88.68	£5,040	£1,500	£700

=== Women's ===
Year	Champion (average in final)	Score	Runner-up (average in final)	Total Prize Money	Champion	Runner-up
2009	(England) Trina Gulliver	–	(England) Sue Gulliver			
2010	(England) Deta Hedman	–	(England) Karen Lawman			
2011	(Russia) Anastasia Dobromyslova	4–2	(Wales) Julie Gore			
2012	(Russia) Anastasia Dobromyslova (2)	4–2	(England) Lisa Ashton			
2013	(Russia) Anastasia Dobromyslova (3)	5–2	(England) Casey Gallagher			
2014	(Russia) Anastasia Dobromyslova (4)	4–3	(England) Deta Hedman			
2015	(England) Lisa Ashton	5–3	(Netherlands) Aileen de Graaf			
2016	(England) Deta Hedman (2)	5–1	(Russia) Anastasia Dobromyslova			
2017	(England) Deta Hedman (3)	5–3	(England) Lisa Ashton			
2018	(Russia) Anastasia Dobromyslova (5)	5–1	(England) Deta Hedman			
2019	(England) Lisa Ashton (2)	5–2	(England) Beau Greaves			
2024	(England) Paige Pauling	5–4	(England) Deta Hedman	£2,120	£700	£350
2025	(England) Gemma Hayter (79.15)	5–4	(Netherlands) Priscilla Steenbergen (73.65)	£2,120	£700	£350

== Tournament records ==
- Most wins 2: (England) John Walton.
- Most Finals 2: (England) John Walton, (England) Gary Robson.
- Most Semi Finals 3: (England) Darryl Fitton.
- Most Quarter Finals 3: (England) Darryl Fitton, Gary Robson, (England) Robbie Green, (England) Scott Mitchell, (England) Tony Randell .
- Most Appearances 7: (England) Darryl Fitton.
- Most Prize Money won £3,275: (England) John Walton.
- Best winning average (96.12) : (England) Scott Mitchell v's (Wales) Dean Reynolds, 2015, Final.
- Youngest Winner age 26: (Northern Ireland) Daryl Gurney.
- Oldest Winner age 49: (England) John Walton.

== See also ==
- List of BDO ranked tournaments
- List of WDF tournaments
