= Robyn Byrne =

Irish darts player

Personal information
- Born: 23 May 1997 (age 29) Blanchardstown, Ireland
- Home town: Dublin, Ireland

Sport
- Sport: Darts
- Playing since: 2014
- Darts: 23g Winmau
- Laterality: Right-handed
- Walk-on music: "Hall of Fame" by The Script featuring will.i.am

Organisation (see split in darts)
- BDO: 2014–2020
- PDC: 2020–
- WDF: 2014–
- Current world ranking: (WDF W) NR (17 August 2026)

WDF major events – best performances
- World Masters: Last 128: 2015, 2016, 2019

Other tournament wins
- Years
Irish Classic	2024
PDC Women's Series	2023, 2024
Youth events
World Masters (girls)	2014
Medal record
Women's Darts
Representing Ireland
WDF World Cup
Gold medal – first place	2023 Esbjerg	Women's team
Gold medal – first place	2025 Seoul	Women's team
Gold medal – first place	2025 Seoul	Women's overall
Silver medal – second place	2017 Kobe	Women's pairs
Bronze medal – third place	2015 Kemer	Women's pairs
Bronze medal – third place	2015 Kemer	Women's team
Bronze medal – third place	2015 Kemer	Women's overall
WDF Europe Cup
Gold medal – first place	2024 Šamorín	Women's singles
Silver medal – second place	2018 Budapest	Women's singles
Silver medal – second place	2024 Šamorín	Women's overall
Bronze medal – third place	2024 Šamorín	Women's team
WDF Europe Cup Youth
Gold medal – first place	2014 Vienna	Girls singles
Gold medal – first place	2014 Vienna	Girls pairs
Gold medal – first place	2014 Vienna	Girls overall

Robyn Byrne (born 23 May 1997) is an Irish darts player who competes in World Darts Federation (WDF) and Professional Darts Corporation (PDC) events. Her biggest achievement to date was winning the Winmau World Masters for girls. She has won three gold medals in the WDF World Cup and a gold medal in singles competition at the 2024 WDF Europe Cup. She has also won two titles on the PDC Women's Series.

== Career ==
Byrne started playing darts at the age of three or four with her father. In 2014 she won every girls competition at the 2014 WDF Europe Cup Youth, defeated Lidia Koltsova in singles competition by 4–2 in legs. Few months later she participated in the 2014 Winmau World Masters. In the girls' competition, she confidently triumphed, beat Beau Greaves by 4–0 in legs. In October 2015, she was selected by the national federation to participate in the 2015 WDF World Cup. In the singles competition, she only advanced to the second round, where she lost to Katie Bellerby by 3–4 in legs. In the pairs competition, together with Caroline Breen, she won a bronze medal. She also won the bronze medal in the team and overall classification.

She competed three times in the Winmau World Masters. In all tournaments, she lost in the first round. She took part in the 2016 WDF Europe Cup, but did not achieve satisfactory results. The following year, during the 2017 WDF World Cup, again together with Caroline Breen, she won the silver medal in the pairs competition. In the final they lost to Anastasia Dobromyslova and Marina Kononova from Russia by 1–6 in legs. In the singles competition, she advanced to the quarter-finals, where she lost to Aileen de Graaf by 1–5 in legs.

In 2018, Byrne achieved the greatest success so far in senior tournaments, winning a silver medal in singles competition during the 2018 WDF Europe Cup. On the way to the finals, she defeated, among others Deta Hedman and Rhian Griffiths. She lost to Fiona Gaylor in the final, by 4–7 in legs. In the pairs and team competitions, she finished in the quarter-finals. From 2020, she takes part in tournaments organized by the Professional Darts Corporation (PDC). In March 2022, she played in the Women's Series final, where she lost to Lisa Ashton by 3–5 in legs. She remained at a good level to the end of the season, taking 11th place in the ranking. She also continues to compete in the World Darts Federation tournaments.

At the end of September 2022, she was selected by the national federation to participate in the 2022 WDF Europe Cup. On the second day of the tournament, she advanced to the quarter-finals of the singles competition, where she lost to eventual gold medalist Beau Greaves by 2–5 in legs. On the third day, she advanced to the quarter-finals of the pairs competition, where she played together with Katie Sheldon. They lost to Lerena Rietbergen and Anca Zijlstra from Netherlands by 1–4 in legs. In the team tournament, she was eliminated in the quarter-finals.

In 2023, Byrne won her maiden PDC Women's Series title, defeating Laura Turner 5–1 in the final after beating Lisa Ashton in the semi-final. Her women's series performances meant that she qualified as the fourth seed for the 2023 Women's World Matchplay. After beating Rhian O'Sullivan 4–3 in the quarter-final, she lost 3–5 to eventual champion Beau Greaves in the semi-final.

Byrne failed to qualify for the 2024 Women's World Matchplay, but enjoyed success towards the end of the year by winning the 2024 WDF Europe Cup, defeating Noa-Lynn van Leuven 7–4 in the final. Byrne also won a second PDC Women's Series title, defeating Lisa Ashton and Fallon Sherrock in the quarter- and semi-final before beating Lorraine Winstanley 5–2 in the final. In doing so, she became the seventh woman to win multiple Women's Series titles. In June 2025, she secured qualification for the 2025 Women's World Matchplay, but lost to Ashton 4–2 in the quarter-final.

== Performance timeline ==
=== BDO ===
Tournament	2015	2016	2019
BDO Ranked televised events
World Masters	1R	1R	1R

=== PDC ===
Tournament	2023	2025
PDC Televised women's events
Women's World Matchplay	SF	QF
