= England Classic =

Darts tournament

Tournament information
- Venue: Ilfracombe Holiday Park
- Location: Ilfracombe
- Country: England
- Established: 2009
- Organisation(s): British Darts Organisation (BDO); World Darts Federation (WDF)
- Format: Legs

Current champion(s)
- David Pallett (men's) (England) Gemma Hayter (women's)

The England Classic is a darts tournament that has been held since 2009.

== List of winners ==
=== Men's ===
Year	Champion	Score	Runner-up	Total Prize Money	Champion	Runner-up
2009	(England) Scott Mitchell	beat	(England) Steve Douglas	£6,500	£2,500	£1,000
2010	(England) Stephen Bunting	6–0	(England) Tony West	£6,500	£2,500	£1,000
2011	(England) Stephen Bunting	6–4	(England) Jamie Robinson	£6,500	£2,500	£1,000
2012	(England) Glen Durrant	6–5	(England) Scott Waites	£7,600	£3,000	£1,200
2013	(England) Glen Durrant	6–5	(England) James Wilson	£7,600	£3,000	£1,200
2014	(England) Mark McGeeney	6–2	(Netherlands) Wesley Harms	£7,600	£3,000	£1,200
2015	Glen Durrant 106.50	6–2	Jim Williams 94.89	£9,300	£3,500	£1,500
2016	(Wales) Dean Reynolds	6–3	(England) Scott Baker	£9,300	£3,500	£1,500
2017	Jeffrey Sparidaans 92.87	6–3	Paul Hogan 81.12	£9,300	£3,500	£1,500
2018	(Netherlands) Wesley Harms	5–4	(Wales) Jim Williams	£10,100	£3,500	£1,500
2019	Wesley Harms 86.93	5–2	Nick Kenny 84.79	£10,100	£3,500	£1,500
2022	Robert Owen 91.45	6–5	Daniel Perry 90.39	£10,905	£2,650	£1,325
2024	Jarred Cole	5–3	Jeff Smith	£5,040	£1,500	£700
2025	David Pallett 89.51	5–4	Jimmy Bristow 82.47	£5,040	£1,500	£700

=== Women's ===
Year	Champion	Score	Runner-up	Total Prize Money	Champion	Runner-up
2009	(England) Trina Gulliver	beat	(England) Rhonda West			
2010	(England) Deta Hedman	4–1	(England) Trish Kidd			
2011	(Wales) Julie Gore	4–2	(England) Lorraine Winstanley			
2012	(England) Deta Hedman	4–3	(England) Lisa Ashton			
2013	(England) Deta Hedman	4–3	(England) Trina Gulliver			
2014	(Russia) Anastasia Dobromyslova	4–2	(England) Deta Hedman			
2015	(England) Lisa Ashton	5–2	(Russia) Anastasia Dobromyslova			
2016	(England) Lisa Ashton	5–2	(England) Deta Hedman			
2017	(England) Lorraine Winstanley	5–2	(Wales) Rhian Griffiths			
2018	(Russia) Anastasia Dobromyslova	4–2	(England) Deta Hedman	£3,400	£1,200	£500
2019	(Russia) Anastasia Dobromyslova	5–2	(England) Deta Hedman	£3,400	£1,200	£500
2022	(England) Beau Greaves	5–0	(England) Lisa Ashton	£4,790	£1,325	£665
2024	(England) Deta Hedman	5–3	(England) Paige Pauling	£2,170	£750	£350
2025	(England) Gemma Hayter (83.50)	5–0	(Netherlands) Aileen de Graaf (63.87)	£2,170	£750	£350

== Tournament records ==
- Most wins 3: (England) Glen Durrant.
- Most Finals 3: (England) Glen Durrant.
- Most Semi Finals 3: (England) Glen Durrant, (England) Paul Hogan.
- Most Quarter Finals 3: (England) Glen Durrant, (England) Paul Hogan, (England) Stephen Bunting, (Netherlands) Wesley Harms.
- Most Appearances 6: (England) Martin Atkins.
- Most Prize Money won £6,500: (England) Glen Durrant.
- Best winning average (106.50) : (England) Glen Durrant. v's (Wales) Jim Williams, 2015, Final.
- Youngest Winner age 25: (England) Stephen Bunting.
- Oldest Winner age 48: (England) Glen Durrant.
