= 2024 Women's World Matchplay =

2024 Betfred Women's World Matchplay

Tournament information
- Dates: 21 July 2024
- Venue: Winter Gardens
- Location: Blackpool, England
- Organisation(s): Professional Darts Corporation (PDC)
- Format: Legs
- Prize fund: £25,000
- Winner's share: £10,000
- High checkout: 129 Fallon Sherrock

Champion(s)
- Beau Greaves (ENG)

The 2024 Betfred Women's World Matchplay was the third edition of the tournament by the Professional Darts Corporation. The tournament featured the top eight players on the 2024 PDC Women's Series Order of Merit, competing in a knockout format, with the winner earning a place in the 2024 Grand Slam of Darts and the 2025 PDC World Darts Championship. The tournament was held at the Winter Gardens in Blackpool on 21 July 2024.

Beau Greaves was the defending champion, defeating Mikuru Suzuki 6–1 in the 2023 final.

Greaves won her second Women's World Matchplay title, beating Fallon Sherrock 6–3 in the final.

== Qualifiers ==
2024 Women's World Matchplay Raceafter 24/24 events(Cut-off: 16 June, 2024)
Rank	Player	Earnings
1	Beau Greaves	£25,100
2	Fallon Sherrock	£18,800
3	Lisa Ashton	£12,600
4	Mikuru Suzuki	£12,500
5	Noa-Lynn van Leuven	£8,700
6	Rhian O'Sullivan	£7,500
7	Anastasia Dobromyslova (Note: Anastasia Dobromyslova has competed under a neutral designation since the 2022 Russian invasion of Ukraine.)	£5,000
8	Aileen de Graaf (Note: Aileen de Graaf, who occupied eighth position in the final 12-month Order of Merit, informed the PDC that she was unavailable to compete in Blackpool due to a prior commitment. As such, Katie Sheldon came into the field for the event.)	£4,700
9	Katie Sheldon	£4,200
10	Gemma Hayter	£4,000

The eight qualifiers for the tournament were the top 8 ranked players on the one-year rolling PDC Women's Series Order of Merit, comprising the last 12 events of the 2023 PDC Women's Series and the first 12 events of the 2024 PDC Women's Series.

Player	Appearance in Women's World Matchplay	Previous best performance
Beau Greaves	2nd	Winner (2023)
Fallon Sherrock	3rd	Winner (2022)
Lisa Ashton	3rd	Semi-finals (2022, 2023)
Mikuru Suzuki	2nd	Runner-up (2023)
Noa-Lynn van Leuven	2nd	Quarter-finals (2023)
Rhian O'Sullivan	2nd	Quarter-finals (2023)
Anastasia Dobromyslova	Debut	DNQ
Katie Sheldon	2nd	Quarter-finals (2022)

The qualifiers were:

1. Beau Greaves (champion)
2. Fallon Sherrock (runner-up)
3. Lisa Ashton (semi-finals)
4. Mikuru Suzuki (semi-finals)
5. Noa-Lynn van Leuven (quarter-finals)
6. Rhian O'Sullivan (quarter-finals)
7. Anastasia Dobromyslova (quarter-finals)
8. Katie Sheldon (quarter-finals)

== Schedule ==
Sunday, 21 July

Match #	Round	Player 1	Score	Player 2
1	QF	Beau Greaves 75.46	4 – 1	Katie Sheldon 63.25
2	QF	Mikuru Suzuki 85.72	4 – 2	Noa-Lynn van Leuven 78.36
3	QF	Fallon Sherrock 84.68	4 – 0	Anastasia Dobromyslova 73.22
4	QF	Lisa Ashton 75.48	4 – 1	Rhian O'Sullivan 70.84
5	SF	Beau Greaves 88.02	5 – 2	Mikuru Suzuki 80.63
6	SF	Fallon Sherrock 69.82	5 – 4	Lisa Ashton 68.28
7	F	Beau Greaves 98.75	6 – 3	Fallon Sherrock 87.60

== Draw ==
Quarter-finals (best of 7 legs); 21 July
1	Beau Greaves 75.46	4
8	Katie Sheldon 63.25	1
4	Mikuru Suzuki 85.72	4
5	Noa-Lynn van Leuven 78.36	2
2	Fallon Sherrock 84.68	4
7	Anastasia Dobromyslova 73.22	0
3	Lisa Ashton 75.48	4
6	Rhian O'Sullivan 70.84	1

Semi-finals (best of 9 legs); 21 July
1	Beau Greaves 88.02	5
4	Mikuru Suzuki 80.63	2
2	Fallon Sherrock 69.82	5
3	Lisa Ashton 68.28	4

Final (best of 11 legs); 21 July
1	Beau Greaves 98.75	6
2	Fallon Sherrock 87.60	3
