= Vicky Pruim =

Swedish darts player

Personal information
- Nickname: "Antwerp Lightning"
- Born: 24 February 1974 (age 52) Antwerp, Belgium
- Home town: Chester, England

Sport
- Sport: Darts
- Playing since: 1987
- Darts: Javelin Spectron 24grams
- Laterality: Right-handed
- Walk-on music: "Waterloo" by Abba

Organisation (see split in darts)
- BDO: 1990, 1999–2002, 2016–2020
- WDF: 2016–present
- Current world ranking: (WDF W) 71 (17 August 2026)

WDF major events – best performances
- World Championship: Semi-final: 2002
- World Masters: Semi-final: 2016
- Dutch Open: Winner (1): 2001

Other tournament wins
- Years
Belgium Open	2004
Canadian Open	2001
England Open	2000
Finnish Masters	2016, 2017
Finnish Open	2016
French Open	2000
German Open	1991
Hungarian Open	2000
Isle of Man Classic	2024
PDC Women's Series	2026
Medal record
Women's Darts
Representing Sweden
WDF World Cup
Gold medal – first place	2017 Kobe	Women's singles
WDF Europe Cup
Silver medal – second place	1990 Paola	Women's singles
Silver medal – second place	2022 Gandía	Women's pairs
Silver medal – second place	2022 Gandía	Women's overall
Bronze medal – third place	2022 Gandía	Sweden team

Vicky Pruim (born 24 February 1974) is a Belgian-born Swedish darts player who played internationally for Belgium and Sweden, and competes in competitive darting events around the world.

Pruim started her career in 1987, successfully defending her Belgium No. 1 ladies title for 13 years. She moved to Sweden in 2002, where she gained Swedish nationality, and became part of the Swedish Darts Federation national team. She qualified for the BDO World Darts Championship in 2002, 2018, and 2020. Pruim reached the last 16 of the 2022 WDF World Darts Championship. She won the women's singles Gold Medal for Sweden at the 2017 WDF World Cup in Japan and achieved bronze for Sweden at the 2019 WDF World Cup in Romania. Pruim won PDC Women’s Series event 12 in 2026. Pruim moved to England in 2019 and now resides in Chester.

== Career ==
=== 1990–2002 ===
In 1990, Pruim reached the Final of the WDF Europe Cup. In 1999, she reached the Last 16 of the WDF World Cup and Quarter Final of the World Masters. In 2001, she won the Dutch Open. She reached the Semi Final of the 2002 BDO World Darts Championship, where she lost to Trina Gulliver 2–0.

=== 2016–present ===
In 2016, Pruim won the Finnish Masters and Finnish Open. In 2017, she won the Finnish Masters for a second time. She qualified for the 2018 BDO World Darts Championship as one of the playoff qualifiers. In the tournament, she played Trina Gulliver in the Last 16 losing 2–1.

In March 2024, Pruim won a first WDF title in almost seven years, defeating Beau Greaves in the final of the Isle of Man Classic.

== World Championship results ==
=== BDO/WDF ===
- 2002: Semi-finals (lost to Trina Gulliver 1–2) (sets)
- 2018: First round (lost to Trina Gulliver 1–2)
- 2020: First round (lost to Corrine Hammond 0–2)
- 2022: Second round (lost to Lorraine Winstanley 0–2)
