= Katie Sheldon =

Irish darts player (born 2003)

Personal information
- Born: 23 December 2003 (age 22) Dublin, Ireland

Sport
- Sport: Darts
- Playing since: 2010
- Darts: 21g Target
- Laterality: Right-handed
- Walk-on music: "Hotstepper" by John Gibbons

Organisation (see split in darts)
- BDO: 2018–2020
- PDC: 2020–
- WDF: 2018–
- Current world ranking: (WDF W) NR (17 August 2026)

Other tournament wins
- Years
Youth events
World Masters	2019
German Open	2018
Medal record
Women's Darts
Representing Ireland
WDF World Cup
Gold medal – first place	2023 Esbjerg	Women's team
Gold medal – first place	2025 Seoul	Women's team
Gold medal – first place	2025 Seoul	Women's overall
WDF Europe Cup
Silver medal – second place	2024 Šamorín	Women's overall
Bronze medal – third place	2024 Šamorín	Women's singles
Bronze medal – third place	2024 Šamorín	Women's team

Katie Sheldon (born 23 December 2003) is an Irish professional darts player who competes in World Darts Federation (WDF) and Professional Darts Corporation (PDC) events.

In her youth career, Sheldon won the 2019 World Masters Girls and 2018 German Open Girls.

In the PDC, Sheldon was runner-up at 2022 PDC Women's Series 8 and qualified for the Women's World Matchplay in both 2022 and 2024.

== Career ==
Sheldon started playing darts in 2010, at the age of 7. In 2018 she won two World Darts Federation tournaments for girls, namely, the World Masters where she beat Sophie McKinlay by 4–3 in the final in deciding leg, and the German Open where she beat Christina Schuler in the final. In October 2019, it was announced that Sheldon had entered into a partnership with Target Darts.

Sheldon's results in the 2022 PDC Women's Series tournaments, including her first final at event eight, allowed her to qualify for the inaugural 2022 Women's World Matchplay. This was also her first senior major tournament. In the quarter-finals she faced Fallon Sherrock. Sheldon played a good match, surpassing her rival in some moments, and had the chance to go 3–1 up. Sheldon was close to finishing the fourth leg with 107, but missed the double, giving her opponent a chance at 2–2. In the end, she lost 2–4 to Sherrock.

At the end of September 2022, she was selected by the national federation to participate in the 2022 WDF Europe Cup. On the second day of the tournament, she advanced to the fifth round of the singles competition, where she lost to Lorraine Winstanley by 0–4 in legs. On the third day, she advanced to the quarter-finals of the pairs competition, where she played together with Robyn Byrne. They lost to Lerena Rietbergen and Anca Zijlstra from Netherlands by 1–4 in legs. In the team tournament, she was eliminated in the quarter-finals. Ultimately, despite her good performance, she did not win a medal.

Along with qualifying for 2022 Women's World Matchplay, she was invited to participate in the 2022 PDC World Youth Championship. In the group stage she faced Jaein Oh and Jim Moston. She lost both games and was eliminated from the tournament. Her campaign in the 2023 World Youth Championship ended similarly, with group stage losses to Adam Paxton and Duyane-Wade Decena.

After failing to qualify in 2023, she qualified for the 2024 Women's World Matchplay, where she once again lost in the quarter-final to the eventual champion, this time Beau Greaves. Her participation in the 2024 PDC World Youth Championship once again ended with defeats in every game of the group stage, losing to Wessel Nijman, Jack Howarth and Zac Griffiths.

== Performance timeline ==
Tournament	2022	2023	2024	2025
PDC Non-ranked televised events
Women's World Matchplay	QF	DNQ	QF	DNQ
World Youth Championship	RR	RR	RR	DNQ
