= Beau Greaves =

English darts player (born 2004)

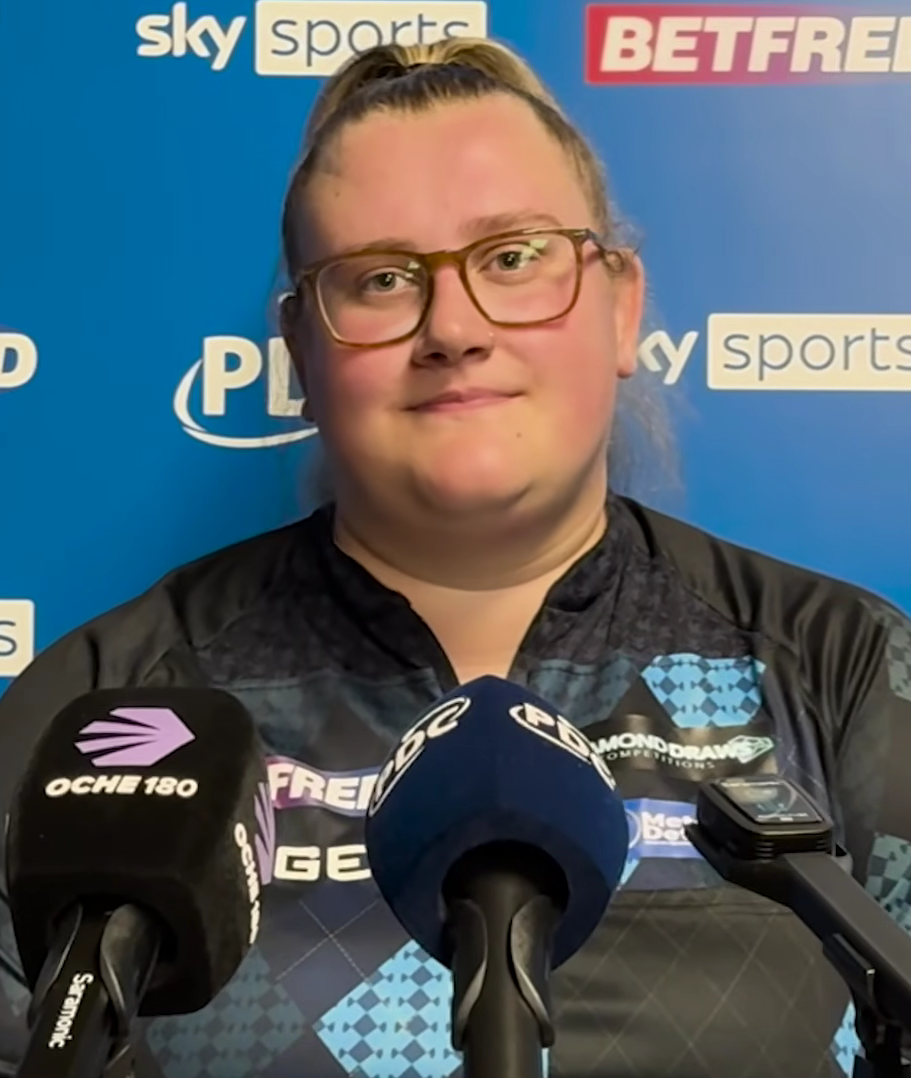
- Greaves at the 2026 Women's World Matchplay

Personal information
- Nickname: "Beau 'n' Arrow"
- Born: 9 January 2004 (age 22) Doncaster, South Yorkshire, England

Sport
- Sport: Darts
- Playing since: 2013
- Darts: 23g Target Signature Gen 1
- Laterality: Right-handed
- Walk-on music: "Bitter Sweet Symphony" by The Verve

Organisation (see split in darts)
- BDO: 2014–2020
- PDC: 2022–present (Tour Card: 2026–present)
- WDF: 2014–2025
- Current world ranking: (PDC) 74 ▲1 (5 November 2026)

WDF major events – best performances
- World Championship: Winner (3): 2022, 2023, 2024
- World Masters: Winner (2): 2022, 2024
- Australian Open: Winner (1): 2022
- Dutch Open: Winner (2): 2022, 2024

PDC premier events – best performances
- World Championship: Last 96: 2023
- UK Open: Last 64: 2025
- Grand Slam: Group Stage: 2023, 2024, 2025, 2026

Other tournament wins
- Years
Women's World Matchplay (×3)	2023, 2024, 2026
Medal record
Women's Darts
Representing England
WDF World Cup
Gold medal – first place	2019 Cluj	Girls singles
Gold medal – first place	2019 Cluj	Girls pairs
Gold medal – first place	2019 Cluj	Youth overall
Gold medal – first place	2023 Esbjerg	Women's singles
Gold medal – first place	2023 Esbjerg	Women's pairs
Gold medal – first place	2023 Esbjerg	Women's overall
Bronze medal – third place	2023 Esbjerg	Women's team
WDF Europe Cup
Gold medal – first place	2022 Gandía	Women's singles
Gold medal – first place	2022 Gandía	Women's pairs
Gold medal – first place	2022 Gandía	Women's team
Gold medal – first place	2022 Gandía	Women's overall
WDF Europe Cup Youth
Gold medal – first place	2016 Budapest	Girls singles
Gold medal – first place	2016 Budapest	Girls overall
Gold medal – first place	2018 Ankara	Girls singles
Gold medal – first place	2018 Ankara	Girls pairs
Gold medal – first place	2018 Ankara	Girls overall
Gold medal – first place	2019 Ankara	Girls pairs
Gold medal – first place	2019 Ankara	Girls overall
Silver medal – second place	2016 Budapest	Girls pairs
Bronze medal – third place	2019 Ankara	Girls singles

Beau Greaves (born 9 January 2004) is an English professional darts player who competes in Professional Darts Corporation (PDC) events and previously competed in World Darts Federation (WDF) and British Darts Organisation (BDO) events. She is a three-time women's world champion, having won three consecutive WDF World Darts Championship titles. She is a three-time Women's World Matchplay champion and has won a record 61 PDC Women's Series titles. In April 2026, she became the first woman to win a PDC ranking title with her victory at Players Championship 11.

Greaves began regularly playing in tournaments and leagues at age 10. She was a two-time girls' World Masters champion before making her senior world championship debut in the 2020 BDO World Darts Championship's women's event at age 15. She won her first women's world title at the 2022 WDF World Darts Championship and defended it at the next two editions. She made her PDC Women's Series debut during the 2022 season and has finished top of the Women's Series rankings every year since 2023. She won the 2023 Women's World Matchplay on debut, defended her title the following year, and added a third title at the 2026 edition.

Outside of the women's game, she has won titles in the PDC's mixed-gender secondary tours, winning two Challenge Tours and four Development Tours. She finished second in the 2025 Development Tour rankings, which earned her a PDC Tour Card, becoming the second female player to earn one on merit after Lisa Ashton. She is also the first woman to reach the final of the PDC World Youth Championship, beating world champion Luke Littler in the semi-finals of the 2025 event.

== Career ==
=== Early career ===
Greaves started playing regularly in tournaments and league games at age 10, having been introduced to darts by her brother Taylor. She made her stage debut at the girls' 2014 World Masters and lost in the final to Robyn Byrne. Two years later, she won a gold medal in the 2016 WDF Europe Cup Youth singles competition against Christina Schuler 4–1 in legs. In the same year, she advanced reached her second girls' World Masters final at the 2016 World Masters but lost to Veronika Koroleva.

As well as winning numerous national girls' titles, Greaves became a regular contender in the women's tournaments, reaching the final of the Jersey Classic at the age of 13. In 2017, in her third girls' World Masters final, at the 2017 Winmau World Masters, she took the title after whitewashing Katie Sheldon.

Greaves successfully defended her title at the girls' 2018 Winmau World Masters by whitewashing Hayley Crowley in the final. In 2018, she won the girls' competition in the 2018 WDF Europe Cup Youth, defeating Emine Dursan in the singles competition.

=== 2019–2021 ===
In April, she hit a nine-dart finish at a tournament in her hometown of Doncaster. In May 2019, Greaves won both the women's events Welsh Open and the Welsh Classic. In June, she won both women's singles titles, the girls' title, and the overall youth title at the England National Singles and the England Open. She also became the youngest player to win the British Pentathlon. At the end of the month she also won the BDO Gold Cup, followed by another title at the West Midlands Open at the end of August.

At the beginning of September, Greaves won the England Matchplay. At the 2019 WDF World Cup in Romania, she won the girls' singles, and the doubles partnering Shannon Reeves. She also won the Northern Cyprus Open. At the age of 15, Greaves qualified for the 2020 BDO World Darts Championship for the first time as the sixth seed, becoming the youngest female player to play in the World Darts Championship. She beat Tori Kewish in the first round and Aileen de Graaf in the quarter-finals to reach the last four on debut, where she lost to reigning champion Mikuru Suzuki.

After winning the Scottish Open in February 2020, Greaves was ranked number one in the women's British Darts Organisation rankings at the age of 16. In 2021, Greaves struggled with dartitis during the COVID-19 pandemic. Despite this, she won the Welsh Classic.

=== 2022: First women's world title, PDC World Championship debut ===
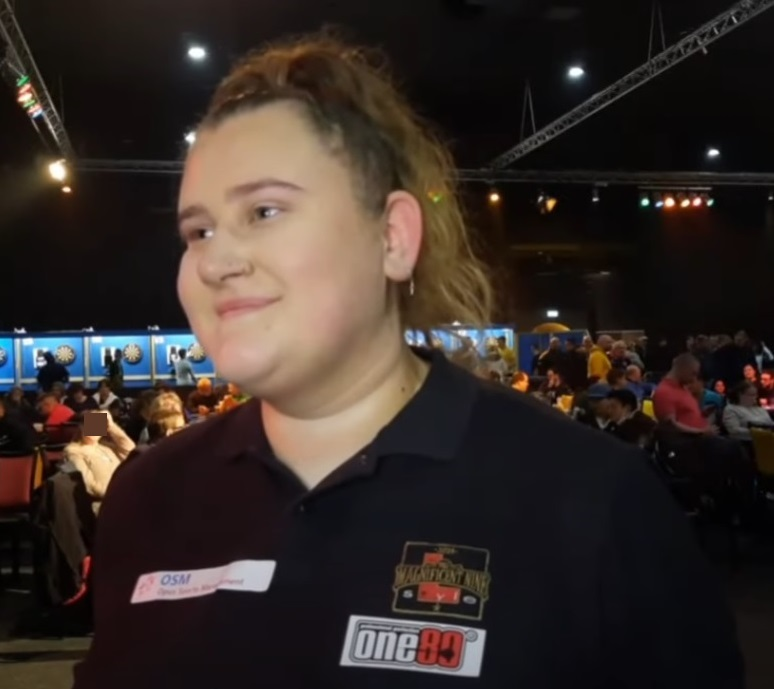
Greaves in 2022

Greaves took part in the 2022 WDF World Darts Championship at Lakeside. A 3–0 win semi-final win over Lorraine Winstanley made Greaves the youngest woman to be in a Women's World Championship final. The following day, she was crowned the youngest ever Women's World Champion, after a 4–0 win over Kirsty Hutchinson.

Greaves won the Welsh Open for the second time in May and the 2022 Dutch Open in June. She was also able to win the individual event of the Six Nations Cup, she also won the Romanian Open and England Open and the platinum title at the 2022 Australian Darts Open also belonged to her. In August 2022, Greaves made her debut at the 2022 PDC Women's Series and won four consecutive finals, becoming the first player to do so. She subsequently won four more consecutive finals to end the year with a record eight straight Women's Series titles.

At the end of September 2022, Greaves was selected by the national federation to participate in the 2022 WDF Europe Cup held in Spain. On the second day of the tournament, she advanced to the finals of the singles competition, defeating Anca Zijlstra, Robyn Byrne, and Rhian O'Sullivan en route to the final. In the final, she beat Almudena Fajardo 7–4 in legs.

In December 2022, Greaves made her debut at the PDC World Darts Championship, losing to William O'Connor 0–3 in the first round.

=== 2023: Second world title ===
After winning seven of the twelve Women's Series events, Greaves was the number one seed in her debut PDC Women's World Matchplay. On 23 July, Greaves participated in the 2023 Women's World Matchplay, having missing the inaugural tournament the year before. Greaves whitewashed Noa-Lynn van Leuven, defeated Robyn Byrne 5–3, and beat Mikuru Suzuki 6–1 in the final.

Greaves qualified for the 2023 Grand Slam of Darts with her title victory at the Women's Matchplay. In November, she was drawn into Group H alongside Nathan Aspinall, Damon Heta, and Ricardo Pietreczko. Her debut match at the Grand Slam of Darts was against Aspinall, to whom she lost 5–4. In her next match, she defeated Ricardo Pietreczko 5–1. However, she lost to Damon Heta 5–4, having missed a match dart. This meant she finished third in her group and was eliminated.

Before the start of the 2023 WDF Women's World Championship, the World Darts Federation (WDF) announced that the Professional Darts Corporation (PDC) had placed a ban on participation in the 2024 PDC World Championship for players who played in the 2023 WDF World Championships. In order to instead defend her WDF Women's World title, Greaves declined her invite to the PDC World Championship. Greaves reached the final for a second consecutive year, with whitewash wins in the last 16, quarter-finals, and against Rhian O'Sullivan in the semi-finals. Greaves retained her title by defeating Aileen de Graaf 4–1 in sets.

=== 2024: Third world title ===
External videos
- Clip of her three consecutive maximum scores

In early February, Greaves reclaimed the WDF Dutch Open trophy. She whitewashed all her opponents on her way to the quarter-finals, where she defeated Lorraine Hyde 4–1. Greaves defeated Noa-Lynn van Leuven 4–1 in the semi-finals to enter her third consecutive final. She beat Aileen de Graaf 5–1 in the final to win the Dutch Open for the second time in her career. A video during her quarter-final pair match went viral after Greaves hit ten perfect darts in a 701-leg match, including three consecutive maximums before hitting the double.

In April, Greaves made her MODUS Super Series debut in Group B. In a 4–1 win over Kevin Painter, she broke the record for highest televised average by a female player, averaging 114.56 and hitting six 180s along the way. She reached finals night unbeaten, and achieved 4–1 wins, in legs, against Sebastian Białecki, Marvin van Velzen and Adam Lipscombe. She defeated Białecki for the fourth time that week, 4–2 in the final to become the first woman to win a MODUS Super Series week and the first player to go unbeaten during a whole week.

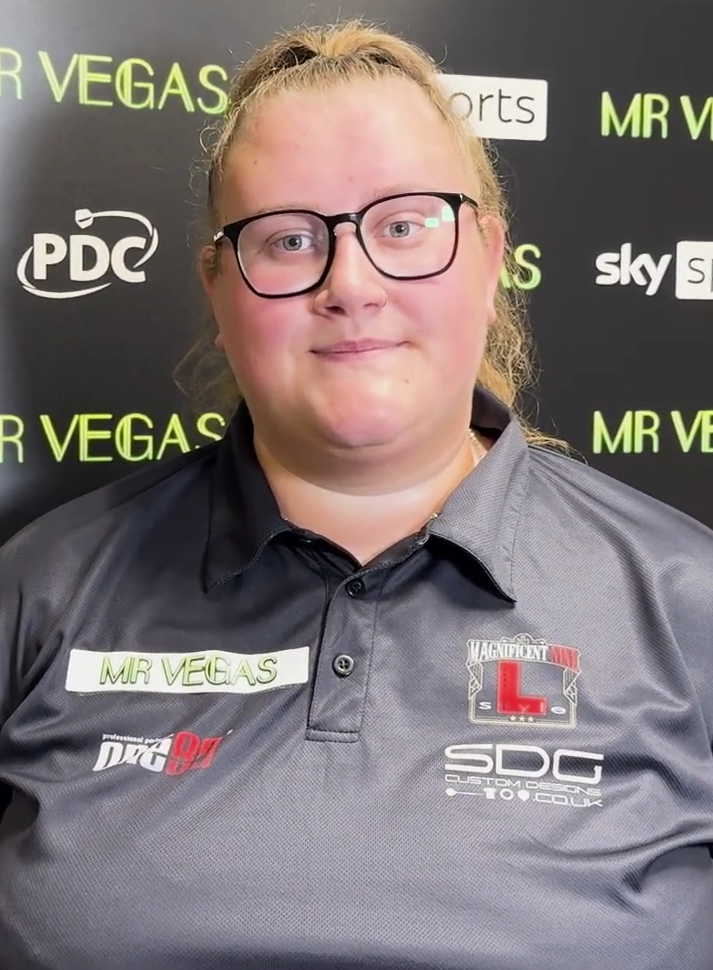
Greaves at the 2024 Grand Slam of Darts

On 21 July 2024, Greaves successfully defended her Women's World Matchplay title, defeating Fallon Sherrock 6–3 in the final. The victory qualified Greaves for the 2024 Grand Slam of Darts; however, she stated she was not looking forward to playing alongside the predominantly male field as she felt "most women don't have the consistency." Greaves was drawn in Group B alongside Danny Noppert, Martin Schindler, and Cameron Menzies. Greaves lost her opening two matches: to Danny Noppert 5–3; and to Martin Schindler 5–1 and was eliminated. However she achieved a 5–1 victory against Menzies in her final group game. Following her victory she later spoke about her will to compete with men more often in 2025 and beyond, as she felt the need to face new challenges.

After her match against Menzies, Greaves expressed her disapproval of the ruling preventing players from playing more than one organisation's World Championship in the same year calling it "stupid". Greaves decided to decline her invite to play in the 2025 PDC World Championship, which she qualified for as the winner of the Women's Matchplay, to instead defend her back-to-back Lakeside titles. She was top seed at the WDF Lakeside World Championship for the third year in a row, and began her defence with whitewash victories in the last 16, and quarter-finals. She achieved another whitewash in the semi-finals, defeating Deta Hedman, reaching her third consecutive Lakeside final. Greaves successfully defended her back-to-back Lakeside titles, defeating debutant Sophie McKinlay 4–1 in the final, becoming the second woman to win hat-trick of titles after Trina Gulliver.

=== 2025 ===
At the beginning of 2025, Greaves entered PDC Qualifying School (Q-School) in hopes of earning a two-year PDC Tour Card, being automatically sent through to the final stage due to finishing in the top eight of the 2024 Development Tour Order of Merit ranking. She finished 17th on the final ranking table, which was outside of the Tour Card places. In February, Greaves made her UK Open debut at the 2025 event. After wins over Stefan Bellmont, Rhys Griffin and Mickey Mansell, she was drawn to play world number one Luke Humphries in the fourth round. She led the match 7–5 but conceded the next five legs to lose 10–7. Humphries praised her in his post-match interview, stating, "She belongs in this environment. She really did test me there and if we were in a Premier League game she would have beaten me."

Throughout the year, Greaves competed on all three of the PDC's secondary tours: the Women's Series, Challenge Tour, and Development Tour. In late February, following title wins on each tour, she occupied the top spots on the Women's Series, Challenge Tour and Development Tour Orders of Merit concurrently, becoming the first player in PDC history to do so. In total, she won two Challenge Tour titles, three Development Tour titles, and eighteen Women's Series titles. She captured the last 13 Women's Series titles in a row, winning a record-breaking 86 matches in succession. In October, Greaves earned a two-year Tour Card through finishing second on the Development Tour to become the fourth woman to hold a Tour Card—after Stacy Bromberg, Tricia Wright and Lisa Ashton—and the second woman to earn a Tour Card on merit, after Ashton obtained one at 2020 PDC Q-School.

After competing in the final Development Tour events of the year, Greaves participated in the PDC World Youth Championship, where she reached the final following a 6–5 victory over Luke Littler in the semi-finals, becoming the first woman to reach the final of the tournament. Days after her win against Littler, it was confirmed that Greaves would compete in the PDC World Darts Championship for the second time in her career. She lost 6–3 to Gian van Veen in the World Youth Championship final on 23 November.

=== 2026 ===
At the 2026 PDC World Championship, Greaves was drawn to play 22nd seed Daryl Gurney in the first round. She took the match to a deciding set, ultimately losing 3–2. She won all four events on the opening weekend of the 2026 PDC Women's Series, taking her to 17 consecutive Women's Series titles and extending her winning streak to 113 matches. At Players Championship 6, Greaves became the first woman to hit a nine-dart finish on the PDC Pro Tour, doing so in her second-round match against Mensur Suljović.

At Players Championship 11, Greaves became the first woman to win a PDC ranking title, defeating Michael Smith 8–7 in the final. In July, she became the first woman to qualify for a PDC European Tour event. Later that month, she claimed her third Women's World Matchplay title by beating Fallon Sherrock 6–5 in the final. In September she became the first woman to win a match on the PDC European Tour, beating Daryl Gurney in the Czech Darts Open.

== Personal life ==
Greaves is the youngest of six siblings. Her older sister Bobbi regularly accompanies her to darts competitions. Her older brother Taylor is also a darts player, most recently competing at 2025 PDC Q-School alongside Greaves.

She was given her nickname, "Beau 'n' Arrow", by her father's friend from her local pub in Doncaster.

== World Championship results ==
=== BDO World Championship ===
- 2020: Semi-finals (lost to Mikuru Suzuki 1–2)

=== WDF World Championship ===
- 2022: Winner (beat Kirsty Hutchinson 4–0)
- 2023: Winner (beat Aileen de Graaf 4–1)
- 2024: Winner (beat Sophie McKinlay 4–1)

=== PDC World Championship ===
- 2023: First round (lost to William O'Connor 0–3)
- 2026: First round (lost to Daryl Gurney 2–3)

== Career finals ==
=== WDF major/platinum finals: 11 (10 titles) ===
Legend
World Championship (3–0)
World Masters (2–0)
Platinum Tournaments (3–1)
Europe Cup Singles (1–0)
World Cup Singles (1–0)

Outcome	No.	Year	Championship	Opponent in the final	Score (Note: (l) = score in legs, (s) = score in sets.)	Ref.
Winner	1.	2022	World Championship	Kirsty Hutchinson	4–0 (s)	
Winner	2.	2022	Dutch Open	Rhian O'Sullivan	5–1 (l)	
Winner	3.	2022	Australian Open	Mikuru Suzuki	8–5 (l)	
Winner	4.	2022	Europe Cup Singles	Almudena Fajardo	7–4 (l)	
Winner	5.	2022	World Masters	(Spain) Almudena Fajardo	6–0 (l)	
Runner-up	1.	2023	Dutch Open	Aileen de Graaf	2–5 (l)	
Winner	6.	2023	World Cup Singles	(England) Deta Hedman	7–5 (l)	
Winner	7.	2023	World Championship (2)	Aileen de Graaf	4–1 (s)	
Winner	8.	2024	Dutch Open (2)	Aileen de Graaf	5–1 (l)	
Winner	9.	2024	World Masters (2)	Rhian O'Sullivan	6–0 (l)	
Winner	10.	2024	World Championship (3)	Sophie McKinlay	4–1 (s)	

=== PDC women's televised finals: 3 (3 titles) ===
Legend
Women's World Matchplay (3–0)

Outcome	No.	Year	Championship	Opponent in the final	Score	Ref.
Winner	1.	2023	Women's World Matchplay	Mikuru Suzuki	6–1 (l)	
Winner	2.	2024	Women's World Matchplay (2)	Fallon Sherrock	6–3 (l)	
Winner	3.	2026	Women's World Matchplay (3)	Fallon Sherrock	6–5 (l)	

== Performance timeline ==
Beau Greaves' performance timeline is as follows:

=== BDO ===
Tournament	2020
BDO World Championship	SF

=== WDF ===
Tournament	2022	2023	2024	2025
WDF Ranked major/platinum women's events
World Championship	W	W	W	DNP
World Masters	W	NH	W	DNP
Australian Open	W	DNP	NH	
Dutch Open	W	F	W	SF

=== PDC ===
Tournament	2023	2024	2025	2026
PDC Ranked televised events
World Championship	1R	DNP (Note: Greaves chose to play the WDF World Darts Championship following a ruling by the PDC which did not allow players to compete in both World Championships in the same year.)		1R
UK Open	DNP		4R	2R
Grand Slam	RR	RR	RR	RR
PDC Non-ranked televised events
World Youth Championship	DNP		F	DNP
PDC Televised women's events
Women's World Matchplay	W	W	SF	W
Career statistics
Season-end ranking (PDC)	146	165	107	

==== European Tour ====
Tournament	2026
Hungarian Trophy	1R
Czech Open	2R
Flanders Trophy	1R

==== Players Championships ====
Season	1	2	3	4	5	6	7	8	9	10	11	12	13	14	15	16	17	18	19	20	21	22	23	24	25	26	27	28	29	30	31	32	33	34
2025 (Note: Not a Tour card holder)	WIG; 1R	WIG; 2R	ROS; DNP		LEI; 2R	LEI; 2R	Did not participate																	MIL; 3R	MIL; 2R	Did not participate								
2026	HIL; 4R	HIL; 1R	WIG; 4R	WIG; 1R	LEI; 2R	LEI; 3R	LEI; 1R	LEI; 1R	WIG; QF	WIG; QF	MIL; W	MIL; 4R	HIL; 3R	HIL; 2R	LEI; QF	LEI; 2R	LEI; 2R	LEI; 2R	MIL; 2R	MIL; 2R	WIG; SF	WIG; 1R	LEI; 1R	LEI; 1R	HIL; 4R	HIL; 3R	LEI; 1R	LEI; 1R	ROS; 3R	ROS; 1R	ROS; SF	ROS; 2R	LEI; 3R	LEI; DNP

==== Development Tour ====
Season	1	2	3	4	5	6	7	8	9	10	11	12	13	14	15	16	17	18	19	20	21	22	23	24
2024	MIL; 3R	MIL; QF	MIL; QF	MIL; 5R	Did not participate						WIG; W	WIG; QF	WIG; QF	WIG; QF	WIG; DNP	WIG; SF	WIG; QF	WIG; 3R	WIG; QF	Did not participate				
2025	MIL; 6R	MIL; W	MIL; 4R	MIL; W	MIL; DNP	LEI; W	LEI; 4R	LEI; 2R	LEI; SF	LEI; QF	HIL; 3R	HIL; SF	HIL; QF	HIL; 4R	HIL; QF	MIL; SF	MIL; 5R	MIL; 6R	MIL; SF	MIL; 3R	WIG; F	WIG; 5R	WIG; 5R	WIG; SF
2026	LEI; L32	LEI; L128	LEI; L16	LEI; QF	LEI; DNP	MIL; L16	MIL; QF	MIL; L16	MIL; L16	Did not participate														

==== Challenge Tour ====
Season	1	2	3	4	5	6	7	8	9	10	11	12	13	14	15	16	17	18	19	20	21	22	23	24
2025	MIL; W	MIL; 4R	MIL; W	MIL; 4R	MIL; 2R	HIL; DNP					MIL; 3R	MIL; QF	MIL; 3R	MIL; 1R	MIL; 3R	Did not participate								

==== Women's Series ====
Season	1	2	3	4	5	6	7	8	9	10	11	12	13	14	15	16	17	18	19	20	21	22	23	24
2020	QF	L64	L16	L128																				
2022	Did not participate												W	W	W	W	W	W	W	W				
2023	W	W	QF	W	W	F	QF	SF	W	L16	W	W	W	W	W	W	L16	QF	W	F	QF	SF	QF	SF
2024	F	QF	L32	F	F	W	W	F	W	QF	QF	F	W	L16	F	W	W	W	L64	L64	F	W	DNP	
2025	L16	F	W	W	L64	W	W	W	L32	L16	L32	W	W	W	W	W	W	W	W	W	W	W	W	W
2026	W	W	W	W	L64	W	W	W	W	W	QF	QF	W	W	F	L32	DNP		W	W	W	W	W	W

Key

Performance Table Legend
W	Won the tournament	F	Finalist	SF	Semifinalist	QF	Quarterfinalist	#R; RR; Prel.	Lost in # round Round-robin; Preliminary round	DQ	Disqualified
DNQ	Did not qualify	DNP	Did not participate	WD	Withdrew	NH	Tournament not held	#R; RR; Prel.	Lost in # round Round-robin; Preliminary round	NYF	Not yet founded

== Titles ==
The following is a list of titles won by Beau Greaves:

=== PDC titles ===
- PDC Pro Tour (1)
  - PDC Players Championships (1)
    - 2026 (×1): 11
- PDC secondary tours
  - PDC Women's Series (63)
    - 2022 (×8): 13, 14, 15, 16, 17, 18, 19, 20
    - 2023 (×12): 1, 2, 4, 5, 9, 11, 12, 13, 14, 15, 16, 19
    - 2024 (×8): 6, 7, 9, 13, 16, 17, 18, 22
    - 2025 (×18): 3, 4, 6, 7, 8, 12, 13, 14, 15, 16, 17, 18, 19, 20, 21, 22, 23, 24
    - 2026 (×17): 1, 2, 3, 4, 6, 7, 8, 9, 10, 13, 14, 19, 20, 21, 22, 23, 24
  - Women's World Matchplay (3)
    - 2023, 2024, 2026
  - PDC Development Tour (4)
    - 2024 (×1): 11
    - 2025 (×3): 2, 4, 6
  - PDC Challenge Tour (2)
    - 2025 (×2): 1, 3

=== BDO titles ===
==== Senior titles ====
- 2019:
  - BDO Gold Cup
  - Belfry Open
  - British Pentathlon
  - Bruges Open
  - England Open
  - England National Singles
  - LDO Women Classic
  - Northern Cyprus Open
  - Welsh Classic
  - Welsh Open
  - West Midlands Open

=== WDF titles ===
Gold Ranked

- 2020 Scottish Open
- 2022:
  - Isle of Man Open
  - Welsh Open
- 2023 Welsh Open
- 2024:
  - Denmark Open
  - World Open

Silver Ranked

- 2021 Welsh Classic
- 2022:
  - British Classic
  - Czech Open
  - England Open
  - Irish Classic
  - Irish Open
  - Isle of Man Classic
  - Isle of Man Open
  - Romanian Open
- 2023:
  - Isle of Man Classic
  - Isle of Man Open
  - Romanian Open
  - Swedish Masters
  - Swedish Open
  - Welsh Classic
- 2024:
  - British Classic
  - British Open
  - England Open
  - Welsh Classic
  - Welsh Open
  - Viking Cup

Bronze Ranked

- 2023:
  - Isle of Man Masters
  - Romanian Classic
- 2024 Isle of Man Masters

Non-ranked

- 2022:
  - British Internationals
  - British Pentathlon
  - Isle of Man Masters
- 2023 Isle of Man Open
- 2024 British Pentathlon
