= 2023 Women's World Matchplay =

2023 Betfred Women's World Matchplay

Tournament information
- Dates: 23 July 2023
- Venue: Winter Gardens
- Location: Blackpool, England
- Organisation(s): Professional Darts Corporation (PDC)
- Format: Legs
- Prize fund: £25,000
- Winner's share: £10,000
- High checkout: 101 Beau Greaves

Champion(s)
- Beau Greaves (ENG)

The 2023 Betfred Women's World Matchplay was the second staging of the tournament by the Professional Darts Corporation. The tournament featured the top eight players on the 2023 PDC Women's Series Order of Merit, competing in a knockout format, with the winner earning a place in the 2023 Grand Slam of Darts and the 2024 PDC World Darts Championship. The tournament was held at the Winter Gardens in Blackpool on 23 July 2023. In this tournament Noa-Lynn became the first trans woman to compete in a PDC televised event.

Fallon Sherrock was the defending champion, defeating Aileen de Graaf 6–3 in the 2022 Final, but was eliminated in the quarter finals, losing 3–4 to Lisa Ashton.

Beau Greaves won by defeating Mikuru Suzuki 6–1 in the final, thereby securing her spot in the 2023 Grand Slam of Darts.

== Qualifiers ==
Final standings of the 2023 Women's World Matchplay Race(Cut-off: June 26, 2023)
Rank	Player	Earnings
1	Beau Greaves	£24,300
2	Mikuru Suzuki	£12,100
3	Fallon Sherrock	£7,750
4	Robyn Byrne	£6,150
5	Rhian O'Sullivan	£5,400
6	Lisa Ashton	£5,200
7	Aileen de Graaf	£4,400
8	Noa-Lynn van Leuven	£3,750
9	Lorraine Winstanley	£3,150
10	Priscilla Steenbergen	£2,700

The eight qualifiers for the tournament were the top 8 ranked players on the one-year rolling PDC Women's Series Order of Merit, comprising the last 8 events of the 2022 PDC Women's Series and the first 12 events of the 2023 PDC Women's Series.

All eight players were the top 8 ranked on the 2023 PDC Women's Series Order of Merit at the moment of the celebration of the tournament.

Player	Appearance in Women's World Matchplay	Previous best performance
Beau Greaves	Debut	DNQ
Mikuru Suzuki	Debut	DNQ
Fallon Sherrock	2nd	Winner (2022)
Robyn Byrne	Debut	DNQ
Rhian O'Sullivan	Debut	DNQ
Lisa Ashton	2nd	Semi-finals (2022)
Aileen de Graaf	2nd	Runner-up (2022)
Noa-Lynn van Leuven	Debut	DNQ

The qualifiers were:

1. Beau Greaves (champion)
2. Mikuru Suzuki (runner-up)
3. Fallon Sherrock (quarter-finals)
4. Robyn Byrne (semi-finals)
5. Rhian O'Sullivan (quarter-finals)
6. Lisa Ashton (semi-finals)
7. Aileen de Graaf (quarter-finals)
8. Noa-Lynn van Leuven (quarter-finals)

== Schedule ==
Sunday, 23 July

Match #	Round	Player 1	Score	Player 2
1	QF	Beau Greaves 82.36	4 – 0	Noa-Lynn van Leuven 72.08
2	QF	Robyn Byrne 81.68	4 – 3	Rhian O'Sullivan 83.48
3	QF	Mikuru Suzuki 92.16	4 – 2	Aileen de Graaf 84.13
4	QF	Fallon Sherrock 79.09	3 – 4	Lisa Ashton 76.44
5	SF	Beau Greaves 89.51	5 – 3	Robyn Byrne 74.98
6	SF	Mikuru Suzuki 75.14	5 – 3	Lisa Ashton 72.08
7	F	Beau Greaves 79.85	6 – 1	Mikuru Suzuki 72.12

== Draw ==
Quarter-finals (best of 7 legs); 23 July
1	Beau Greaves 82.36	4
8	Noa-Lynn van Leuven 72.08	0
4	Robyn Byrne 81.68	4
5	Rhian O'Sullivan 83.48	3
2	Mikuru Suzuki 92.16	4
7	Aileen de Graaf 84.13	2
3	Fallon Sherrock 79.09	3
6	Lisa Ashton 76.44	4

Semi-finals (best of 9 legs); 23 July
1	Beau Greaves 89.51	5
4	Robyn Byrne 74.98	3
2	Mikuru Suzuki 75.14	5
6	Lisa Ashton 72.08	3

Final (best of 11 legs); 23 July
1	Beau Greaves 79.85	6
2	Mikuru Suzuki 72.12	1
