= 2021 World Series of Darts =

Darts tournament

The 2021 World Series of Darts was a series of televised darts tournaments organised by the Professional Darts Corporation. In 2021, there were set to be five World Series events and one finals event, which for 2021 was moved from Salzburg, Austria to Amsterdam, Netherlands. Due to the COVID-19 pandemic, only one event was held before the 2021 finals, with the remaining four scheduled events postponed to 2022.

Four new venues were due to make their debuts with New York City replacing Las Vegas for the US Darts Masters, and two Australian events were moved to new cities in Wollongong and Townsville. However, only Copenhagen got to play host to its tournament, the 2021 Nordic Darts Masters, which replaced the German Darts Masters.

Though not a tour card holder, Fallon Sherrock was set to appear at all five World Series events as a PDC representative in 2020 after her record-setting top 32 finish at the 2020 World Championship. With all five events being cancelled, she would appear in the 2020 World Series of Darts Finals, and was invited to the Nordic Masters where she became the first woman to compete in a World Series event. After defeating Niels Heinsøe in the first round, and receiving a walkover in the quarter-final courtesy of Gerwyn Price's withdrawal, she defeated Dimitri Van den Bergh in the semi-finals. She ultimately lost the final to Michael van Gerwen as he captured his 16th World Series title.

On 7 April 2021, the US leg and the three Oceanic events were moved to 2022 owing to the continuing COVID-19 pandemic. The 2021 World Series of Darts Finals will go ahead as scheduled on 29–31 October 2021, returning to the AFAS Live in Amsterdam, where the 2019 edition took place.

== Prize money ==
International events
Stage	Prize money
Winner	£20,000
Runner-up	£10,000
Semi-finals	£5,000
Quarter-finals	£2,500
First round	£1,250
Total	£60,000

Finals
Stage	Prize money
Winner	£70,000
Runner-up	£30,000
Semi-finals	£20,000
Quarter-finals	£15,000
Second round	£7,500
First round	£5,000
Total	£300,000

== World Series events ==
No.	Date	Event	Venue	Champion	Legs	Runner-up	Ref
1	4–5 June	US Masters	(United States) New York City, Hulu Theater	Cancelled			
2	6–7 August	New South Wales Masters	(Australia) Wollongong, WIN Entertainment Centre	Cancelled			
3	13–14 August	Queensland Masters	(Australia) Townsville, Townsville Entertainment and Convention Centre	Cancelled			
4	20–21 August	New Zealand Masters	(New Zealand) Hamilton, Claudelands Arena	Cancelled			
5	17–18 September	Nordic Masters	(Denmark) Copenhagen, Forum Copenhagen	Michael van Gerwen	11–7	Fallon Sherrock	
6	29–31 October	World Series of Darts Finals	(Netherlands) Amsterdam, AFAS Live	Jonny Clayton	11–6	Dimitri Van den Bergh	
