= 2021 PDC Pro Tour =

List of darts tournaments

Final 2021 PDC Pro Tour Order of Merit
Rank	Player	Earnings
1	Gerwyn Price	£98,000
2	José de Sousa	£76,750
3	Michael Smith	£68,750
4	Peter Wright	£66,250
5	Jonny Clayton	£60,750
6	Joe Cullen	£59,250
7	Michael van Gerwen	£57,500
8	Brendan Dolan	£56,750
9	Ryan Searle	£54,000
10	Rob Cross	£47,250
11	Dirk van Duijvenbode	£46,250
12	Dimitri Van den Bergh	£44,250
13	Damon Heta	£43,000
14	Luke Humphries	£42,750
15	Callan Rydz	£41,250
16	Krzysztof Ratajski	£41,000
17	James Wade	£40,000
18	Nathan Aspinall	£39,500
19	Ross Smith	£39,000
20	Gabriel Clemens	£38,500
21	Chris Dobey	£36,500
22	Danny Noppert	£33,000
23	Stephen Bunting	£30,750
24	Dave Chisnall	£28,500
25	Martin Schindler	£28,000
26	Vincent van der Voort	£26,250
27	Raymond van Barneveld	£26,000
28	Daryl Gurney	£25,750
29	Ryan Joyce	£24,750
29	Mervyn King	£24,750
31	Mensur Suljović	£24,250
32	Adrian Lewis	£24,000

The 2021 PDC Pro Tour was a series of non-televised darts tournaments organised by the Professional Darts Corporation (PDC). Players Championships and European Tour events are the events that make up the Pro Tour. There were 32 PDC Pro Tour events held, 30 Players Championships and 2 European Tour events, and in a change to previous years, the Challenge and Development Tours were split with 12 UK and European editions each.

== Prize money ==
The prize money for the Players Championship and European Tour events was unchanged from the 2020 levels.

This is how the prize money is divided:

Stage	ET	PC	CT/DT	WS
Winner	£25,000	£10,000	£2,000	£1,000
Runner-up	£10,000	£6,000	£1,000	£600
Semi-finalists	£6,500	£3,000	£500	£400
Quarter-finalists	£5,000	£2,250	£300	£250
Last 16	£3,000	£1,500	£200	£100
Last 32	£2,000	£1,000	£100	£50
Last 48	£1,000	N/A	N/A	N/A
Last 64	N/A	£500	£50	N/A
Total	£140,000	£75,000	£10,000	£5,000

== PDC Tour Card ==
128 players are granted Tour Cards, which enables them to participate in all Players Championships events, the UK Open and qualifiers for all European Tour and select other televised events.

=== Tour cards ===
The 2021 Tour Cards are awarded to:

- (64) The top 64 players from the PDC Order of Merit after the 2021 World Championship.
  - Harry Ward resigned his card, and therefore, Mark McGeeney moved into the top 64.
  - Kyle Anderson resigned his card, and therefore, Maik Kuivenhoven moved into the top 64.
- (27) 27 qualifiers from 2020 Q-School not ranked in the top 64 of the PDC Order of Merit following the World Championship.
- (2) Two highest qualifiers from 2019 Challenge Tour (Callan Rydz and Jesús Noguera).
- (2) The highest qualifiers from 2019 Development Tour (Ryan Meikle and Ciarán Teehan).
- (2) Two highest qualifiers from 2020 Challenge Tour (David Evans and Ritchie Edhouse).
- (2) Two highest qualifiers from 2020 Development Tour (Keane Barry and Berry van Peer).
- (8) The daily winners from the 2021 Qualifying Schools.

Afterwards, the playing field will be complemented by the highest qualified players from the Q-School Order of Merit until the maximum number of 128 Pro Tour Card players had been reached. In 2021, that means that a total of 21 additional players will qualify this way.

=== Q-School ===
The PDC Pro Tour Qualifying School (or Q-School) were split into a UK and European Q-School. Players that are not from Europe could choose which Q-School they wanted to compete in.

In a change from previous years, Q-School were split into two stages; with all players who lost their tour cards after the 2021 World Championship and the top sixteen players from the 2020 Challenge Tour and Development Tour Orders of Merit exempted to the final stage. The first stage would consist of two blocks of three days (with a maximum of 256 players per block) with the last four players from each block qualifying into the final stage. A ranking of other players will also be produced with players qualifying via that ranking to produce a full list of 128 players for each final stage.

Stage One took place in two blocks between 8–10 February & 11–13 February; with the Final Stage held between 14 and 17 February. The winner of each day's play were given a PDC Tour Card.

The UK Q-School was held at the Marshall Arena, Milton Keynes, England; with the European Q-School held at the H+ Hotel, Niedernhausen, Germany.

UK Q-School
February 14	February 15	February 16	February 17
Kirk Shepherd	Jason Heaver	Jake Jones	Scott Mitchell
127 players	126 players	124 players	118 players
European Q-School
February 14	February 15	February 16	February 17
Geert De Vos	Geert Nentjes	Florian Hempel	Boris Koltsov
128 players	127 players	122 players	113 players

An Order of Merit was also created for each Q School. For every win after the Last 64 the players will be awarded 1 point.

To complete the field of 128 Tour Card Holders, places will be allocated down the final Qualifying School Order of Merits in proportion to the number of participants, with 13 cards going to the UK Q-School and 8 going to the European Q-School.

The following players picked up Tour Cards as a result:

UK Q-School Order of Merit

1. Jack Main
2. Andrew Gilding
3. Martin Lukeman
4. Lewy Williams
5. Eddie Lovely
6. Alan Soutar
7. Joe Murnan
8. Gordon Mathers
9. Peter Hudson
10. Jonathan Worsley
11. Brett Claydon
12. John Brown
13. Danny Baggish

European Q-School Order of Merit

1. Martin Schindler
2. Niels Zonneveld
3. Raymond van Barneveld
4. Zoran Lerchbacher
5. Adam Gawlas
6. Michael Unterbuchner
7. John Michael
8. Robert Marijanović

== Players Championships ==
Due to the COVID-19 pandemic still being active, Players Championship events were again put into blocks, this time of 4 events, as opposed to 5 in 2020, with the first 20 Players Championship events being referred to as PDC Super Series 1–5. The final 10 events were split into 3 Super Series events (6–8), with 4 events in Super Series 7 and 3 in Super Series 6 and 8.

No.	Date	Venue	Winner	Legs	Runner-up	Ref.
1	Thursday 25 February	Bolton Whites Hotel, (England) Bolton (Super Series 1)	Joe Cullen (86.52)	8 – 7	Jonny Clayton (92.83)	
2	Friday 26 February	Bolton Whites Hotel, (England) Bolton (Super Series 1)	Callan Rydz (98.34)	8 – 7	Jonny Clayton (97.03)	
3	Saturday 27 February	Bolton Whites Hotel, (England) Bolton (Super Series 1)	Raymond van Barneveld (94.41)	8 – 6	Joe Cullen (95.52)	
4	Sunday 28 February	Bolton Whites Hotel, (England) Bolton (Super Series 1)	Jonny Clayton (97.71)	8 – 6	Damon Heta (96.37)	
5	Tuesday 16 March	Marshall Arena, (England) Milton Keynes (Super Series 2)	Brendan Dolan (97.73)	8 – 6	Michael Smith (93.80)	
6	Wednesday 17 March	Marshall Arena, (England) Milton Keynes (Super Series 2)	Gerwyn Price (102.25)	8 – 5	Luke Humphries (97.08)	
7	Thursday 18 March	Marshall Arena, (England) Milton Keynes (Super Series 2)	Jonny Clayton (101.42)	8 – 5	James Wade (98.58)	
8	Friday 19 March	Marshall Arena, (England) Milton Keynes (Super Series 2)	Peter Wright (101.96)	8 – 3	Gerwyn Price (94.17)	
9	Saturday 24 April	H+ Hotel, (Germany) Niedernhausen (Super Series 3)	José de Sousa (114.08)	8 – 1	Luke Humphries (93.66)	
10	Sunday 25 April	H+ Hotel, (Germany) Niedernhausen (Super Series 3)	Michael Smith (96.95)	8 – 5	Ross Smith (90.07)	
11	Monday 26 April	H+ Hotel, (Germany) Niedernhausen (Super Series 3)	Dirk van Duijvenbode (92.45)	8 – 6	Gian van Veen (92.25)	
12	Tuesday 27 April	H+ Hotel, (Germany) Niedernhausen (Super Series 3)	Dimitri Van den Bergh (95.89)	8 – 7	Dirk van Duijvenbode (92.93)	
13	Monday 14 June	Marshall Arena, (England) Milton Keynes (Super Series 4)	Joe Cullen (93.81)	8 – 6	Gerwyn Price (90.36)	
14	Tuesday 15 June	Marshall Arena, (England) Milton Keynes (Super Series 4)	José de Sousa (100.57)	8 – 6	Michael van Gerwen (94.99)	
15	Wednesday 16 June	Marshall Arena, (England) Milton Keynes (Super Series 4)	José de Sousa (96.60)	8 – 7	Ryan Searle (94.21)	
16	Thursday 17 June	Marshall Arena, (England) Milton Keynes (Super Series 4)	Peter Wright (108.94)	8 – 4	Luke Humphries (94.29)	
17	Monday 5 July	Coventry Building Society Arena, (England) Coventry (Super Series 5)	Stephen Bunting (95.24)	8 – 4	Dimitri Van den Bergh (92.60)	
18	Tuesday 6 July	Coventry Building Society Arena, (England) Coventry (Super Series 5)	Chris Dobey (97.06)	8 – 7	José de Sousa (104.32)	
19	Wednesday 7 July	Coventry Building Society Arena, (England) Coventry (Super Series 5)	Ross Smith (91.48)	8 – 4	Brendan Dolan (90.48)	
20	Thursday 8 July	Coventry Building Society Arena, (England) Coventry (Super Series 5)	Peter Wright (108.84)	8 – 2	Michael van Gerwen (106.27)	
21	Monday 2 August	Barnsley Metrodome, (England) Barnsley (Super Series 6)	Gerwyn Price (107.82)	8 – 7	Damon Heta (95.65)	
22	Tuesday 3 August	Barnsley Metrodome, (England) Barnsley (Super Series 6)	Ryan Searle (94.96)	8 – 7	Peter Wright (102.59)	
23	Wednesday 4 August	Barnsley Metrodome, (England) Barnsley (Super Series 6)	Peter Wright (97.58)	8 – 7	Jonny Clayton (96.26)	
24	Tuesday 19 October	Barnsley Metrodome, (England) Barnsley (Super Series 7)	Dimitri Van den Bergh (100.60)	8 – 5	Adrian Lewis (95.85)	
25	Wednesday 20 October	Barnsley Metrodome, (England) Barnsley (Super Series 7)	Callan Rydz (90.99)	8 – 6	Gabriel Clemens (90.93)	
26	Thursday 21 October	Barnsley Metrodome, (England) Barnsley (Super Series 7)	Rob Cross (97.24)	8 – 6	Ryan Searle (95.74)	
27	Friday 22 October	Barnsley Metrodome, (England) Barnsley (Super Series 7)	Michael Smith (97.06)	8 – 6	Ross Smith (97.07)	
28	Tuesday 2 November	Barnsley Metrodome, (England) Barnsley (Super Series 8)	Chris Dobey (97.85)	8 – 6	Ryan Searle (98.53)	
29	Wednesday 3 November	Barnsley Metrodome, (England) Barnsley (Super Series 8)	Michael van Gerwen (102.30)	8 – 5	Nathan Aspinall (102.57)	
30	Thursday 4 November	Barnsley Metrodome, (England) Barnsley (Super Series 8)	Krzysztof Ratajski (96.04)	8 – 7	Joe Cullen (88.01)	

== European Tour ==
The PDC announced the first (and only) two European Tour events of 2021 on 1 July 2021, with events to be held in Hungary, which was planned to make its debut as a host in 2020 before cancellation, and Gibraltar, returning after a year's absence.

No.	Date	Event	Location	Winner	Legs	Runner-up	Ref.
1	3–5 September	Hungarian Darts Trophy	(Hungary) Budapest, László Papp Budapest Sports Arena	Gerwyn Price (108.74)	8 – 2	Michael Smith (92.17)	
2	24–26 September	Gibraltar Darts Trophy	Gibraltar, Europa Sports Park	Gerwyn Price (105.47)	8 – 0	Mensur Suljović (88.47)	

== PDC Challenge Tour ==
Due to the COVID-19 pandemic still being active, the Challenge Tour was split into UK and European events. The winner of each of the UK and European Orders of Merit at the end of 2021 received a PDC Tour Card, a place at the World Championships and a place at the Grand Slam of Darts.

=== UK Challenge Tour ===
Final UK Challenge Tour ranking
Rank	Player	Earnings
1	Jim Williams	£3,950
2	Shaun McDonald	£3,850
3	Martin Thomas	£3,800
4	Darren Beveridge	£3,400
5	Adam Smith-Neale	£3,350
6	Nathan Rafferty	£3,200
7	Cameron Menzies	£3,150
8	Reece Robinson	£3,100
9	Jamie Clark	£3,000
10	Jim McEwan	£2,700

No.	Date	Venue	Winner	Legs	Runner-up	Ref.
1	Friday 6 August	Marshall Arena, (England) Milton Keynes	Darren Beveridge (87.76)	5 – 2	Martin Thomas (92.83)	
2	Friday 6 August	Marshall Arena, (England) Milton Keynes	Jim Williams (90.60)	5 – 4	Adam Smith-Neale (90.04)	
3	Saturday 7 August	Marshall Arena, (England) Milton Keynes	Jim McEwan (87.46)	5 – 4	Jim Williams (95.67)	
4	Saturday 7 August	Marshall Arena, (England) Milton Keynes	Adam Smith-Neale (85.31)	5 – 1	Gavin Carlin (80.34)	
5	Sunday 8 August	Marshall Arena, (England) Milton Keynes	Shaun McDonald (86.76)	5 – 4	Nathan Girvan (82.25)	
6	Sunday 8 August	Marshall Arena, (England) Milton Keynes	Jamie Clark (82.66)	5 – 3	Ryan Palmer (88.69)	
7	Friday 3 September	Marshall Arena, (England) Milton Keynes	Martin Thomas (86.18)	5 – 2	Shaun McDonald (90.84)	
8	Friday 3 September	Marshall Arena, (England) Milton Keynes	Matthew Dennant (86.04)	5 – 4	Darren Beveridge (82.59)	
9	Saturday 4 September	Marshall Arena, (England) Milton Keynes	Reece Robinson (86.82)	5 – 4	Danny Lauby (86.69)	
10	Saturday 4 September	Marshall Arena, (England) Milton Keynes	Nathan Rafferty (90.00)	5 – 2	Robert Rickwood (77.36)	
11	Sunday 5 September	Marshall Arena, (England) Milton Keynes	James Richardson (98.12)	5 – 1	Jason Hogg (95.97)	
12	Sunday 5 September	Marshall Arena, (England) Milton Keynes	Cameron Menzies (104.38)	5 – 0	Derek Coulson (86.14)	

=== European Challenge Tour ===
Final European Challenge Tour ranking
Rank	Player	Earnings
1	Matt Campbell	£6,800
2	Steven Noster	£5,100
3	Rowby-John Rodriguez	£4,350
4	José Justicia	£3,850
5	Toni Alcinas	£3,800
6	Kevin Doets	£3,750
7	Kenny Neyens	£3,750
8	Luc Peters	£3,600
9	Jimmy Hendriks	£3,350
10	Wesley Plaisier	£2,850

No.	Date	Venue	Winner	Legs	Runner-up	Ref.
1	Friday 2 July	H+ Hotel, (Germany) Niedernhausen	Matt Campbell (82.94)	5 – 1	Gino Vos (81.86)	
2	Friday 2 July	H+ Hotel, (Germany) Niedernhausen	Kevin Doets (97.08)	5 – 2	Christian Kist (99.41)	
3	Saturday 3 July	H+ Hotel, (Germany) Niedernhausen	Rowby-John Rodriguez (91.65)	5 – 0	Toni Alcinas (87.19)	
4	Saturday 3 July	H+ Hotel, (Germany) Niedernhausen	Steven Noster (85.96)	5 – 3	Richard Veenstra (84.68)	
5	Sunday 4 July	H+ Hotel, (Germany) Niedernhausen	Matt Campbell (82.15)	5 – 4	Jitse van der Wal (82.23)	
6	Sunday 4 July	H+ Hotel, (Germany) Niedernhausen	Kenny Neyens (94.16)	5 – 4	Lukas Wenig (85.56)	
7	Friday 3 September	H+ Hotel, (Germany) Niedernhausen	José Justicia (91.41)	5 – 1	Niko Springer (79.58)	
8	Friday 3 September	H+ Hotel, (Germany) Niedernhausen	Toni Alcinas (90.54)	5 – 0	Jimmy Hendriks (77.08)	
9	Saturday 4 September	H+ Hotel, (Germany) Niedernhausen	Steven Noster (89.81)	5 – 2	Jimmy Hendriks (84.33)	
10	Saturday 4 September	H+ Hotel, (Germany) Niedernhausen	Sebastian Białecki (93.71)	5 – 4	Kevin Doets (90.49)	
11	Sunday 5 September	H+ Hotel, (Germany) Niedernhausen	Matt Campbell (90.54)	5 – 0	Wesley Plaisier (82.40)	
12	Sunday 5 September	H+ Hotel, (Germany) Niedernhausen	Luc Peters (89.28)	5 – 4	Kevin Blomme (84.79)	

== PDC Development Tour ==
Due to the COVID-19 pandemic still being active, the Development Tour was split into UK and European events. The winner of each of the UK and European Orders of Merit at the end of 2021 received a PDC Tour Card and a place at the Grand Slam of Darts and the 2022 PDC World Darts Championship.

As Bradley Brooks already qualified for the Grand Slam following his World Youth championship victory, the second placed player of the UK Development Tour, Nathan Rafferty, was granted the Grand Slam spot.

The European Development Tour Winner, Rusty-Jake Rodriguez already qualified for the World Championship via Pro Tour Order of Merit, therefore the second placed player qualified instead. German player Fabian Schmutzler debuted in PDC darts tournaments at the seventh event of the European Development Tour, and qualified for the 2022 PDC World Darts Championship.

=== UK Development Tour ===
Final UK Development Tour ranking
Rank	Player	Earnings
1	Bradley Brooks	£7,900
2	Nathan Rafferty	£6,650
3	Keelan Kay	£6,200
4	Dom Taylor	£5,900
5	Ted Evetts	£5,050
6	Reece Colley	£4,800
7	Liam Meek	£4,800
8	Jarred Cole	£2,750
9	Keane Barry	£2,500
10	Cameron Anderson	£2,100

No.	Date	Venue	Winner	Legs	Runner-up	Ref.
1	Friday 20 August	Marshall Arena, (England) Milton Keynes	Reece Colley (80.72)	5 – 3	Dom Taylor (81.98)	
2	Friday 20 August	Marshall Arena, (England) Milton Keynes	Keelan Kay (87.06)	5 – 4	Dom Taylor (87.91)	
3	Saturday 21 August	Marshall Arena, (England) Milton Keynes	Dom Taylor (83.64)	5 – 4	Jack Male (72.05)	
4	Saturday 21 August	Marshall Arena, (England) Milton Keynes	Liam Meek (81.65)	5 – 3	Dom Taylor (78.48)	
5	Sunday 22 August	Marshall Arena, (England) Milton Keynes	Nathan Rafferty (77.47)	5 – 0	Daniel Perry (68.94)	
6	Sunday 22 August	Marshall Arena, (England) Milton Keynes	Bradley Brooks (90.91)	5 – 2	Ted Evetts (89.46)	
7	Friday 29 October	Metrodome, (England) Barnsley	Ted Evetts (92.18)	5 – 1	Nathan Rafferty (91.53)	
8	Friday 29 October	Metrodome, (England) Barnsley	Bradley Brooks (97.79)	5 – 3	Jarred Cole (95.25)	
9	Saturday 30 October	Metrodome, (England) Barnsley	Keelan Kay (88.54)	5 – 4	Killian Heffernan (83.03)	
10	Saturday 30 October	Metrodome, (England) Barnsley	Reece Colley (83.12)	5 – 2	Lewis Pride (71.78)	
11	Sunday 31 October	Metrodome, (England) Barnsley	Nathan Rafferty (84.69)	5 – 4	Ted Evetts (81.55)	
12	Sunday 31 October	Metrodome, (England) Barnsley	Bradley Brooks (88.67)	5 – 1	Keelan Kay (84.67)	

=== European Development Tour ===
Final EU Development Tour ranking
Rank	Player	Earnings
1	Rusty-Jake Rodriguez	£11,800
2	Fabian Schmutzler	£6,000
3	Geert Nentjes	£4,100
4	Niels Zonneveld	£4,000
5	Sebastian Białecki	£3,950
6	Jurjen van der Velde	£3,700
7	Niko Springer	£3,650
8	Kevin Doets	£3,400
9	Mike van Duivenbode	£3,100
10	Nico Kurz	£2,950

No.	Date	Venue	Winner	Legs	Runner-up	Ref.
1	Friday 20 August	H+ Hotel, (Germany) Niedernhausen	Jurjen van der Velde (83.04)	5 – 2	Bradly Roes (84.54)	
2	Friday 20 August	H+ Hotel, (Germany) Niedernhausen	Rusty-Jake Rodriguez (85.78)	5 – 3	Jeroen Mioch (83.19)	
3	Saturday 21 August	H+ Hotel, (Germany) Niedernhausen	Kevin Doets (93.55)	5 – 4	Mike van Duivenbode (80.59)	
4	Saturday 21 August	H+ Hotel, (Germany) Niedernhausen	Niels Zonneveld (94.81)	5 – 3	Geert Nentjes (87.12)	
5	Sunday 22 August	H+ Hotel, (Germany) Niedernhausen	Rusty-Jake Rodriguez (97.60)	5 – 0	Niels Zonneveld (84.58)	
6	Sunday 22 August	H+ Hotel, (Germany) Niedernhausen	Rusty-Jake Rodriguez (101.19)	5 – 1	Niko Springer (88.34)	
7	Friday 5 November	H+ Hotel, (Germany) Niedernhausen	Rusty-Jake Rodriguez (96.59)	5 – 3	Fabian Schmutzler (83.88)	
8	Friday 5 November	H+ Hotel, (Germany) Niedernhausen	Sebastian Białecki (90.42)	5 – 4	Geert Nentjes (89.33)	
9	Saturday 6 November	H+ Hotel, (Germany) Niedernhausen	Rusty-Jake Rodriguez (96.98)	5 – 1	Niko Springer (92.26)	
10	Saturday 6 November	H+ Hotel, (Germany) Niedernhausen	Fabian Schmutzler (79.27)	5 – 2	Marcel Gerdon (81.07)	
11	Sunday 7 November	H+ Hotel, (Germany) Niedernhausen	Fabian Schmutzler (76.14)	5 – 2	Adam Gawlas (69.35)	
12	Sunday 7 November	H+ Hotel, (Germany) Niedernhausen	Nico Kurz (91.05)	5 – 1	Dominik Grüllich (82.61)	

== PDC Women's Series ==
Final Women's Series rankings
Rank	Player	Earnings		
Rank	Player	Total	1–6	7–12
1	Fallon Sherrock	£8,150	£4,300	£3,850
2	Lisa Ashton	£7,650	£3,950	£3,700
3	Deta Hedman	£3,450	£2,000	£1,450
4	Mikuru Suzuki	£3,050	£1,100	£1,950
5	Anastasia Dobromyslova	£2,700	£1,500	£1,200
6	Corrine Hammond	£2,450	£1,100	£1,350
7	Rhian O'Sullivan	£2,100	£1,350	£750
8	Trina Gulliver	£2,000	£700	£1,300
9	Joanne Locke	£1,850	£950	£900
10	Lorraine Winstanley	£1,750	£400	£1,350

The PDC Women's Series comprised 12 events held over two weekends. The woman who finishes top of the rankings and the runner-up after all 12 events will qualify for the 2022 PDC World Darts Championship.

Originally, the women who finished top of Events 5–8 and 9–12 were each going to qualify for the 2021 Grand Slam of Darts.

However, due to a lack of entrants for the opening weekend in Niedernhausen, the first four events were cancelled and reintegrated into the two weekends held in the United Kingdom. So, instead the winners of Events 1–6 and Events 7–12 each received a spot at the Grand Slam of Darts.

With three victories in five finals, Fallon Sherrock topped the Order of Merit after the first six events to book her Grand Slam entry.

After the ninth event of the series on 23 October, it was confirmed that Sherrock and Ashton, the only players to have won events thus far, were guaranteed to top the order of merit and locked in their return to the World Championship. Though Sherrock also topped the Event 7–12 Order of Merit, Ashton was granted the second Grand Slam spot as the highest ranked player not yet qualified.

No.	Date	Venue	Winner	Legs	Runner-up	Ref.
1	Saturday; 25 September	Marshall Arena, (England) Milton Keynes	Lisa Ashton (84.89)	5 – 3	Rhian O'Sullivan (78.36)	
2	Saturday; 25 September	Marshall Arena, (England) Milton Keynes	Fallon Sherrock (88.83)	5 – 2	Corrine Hammond (76.65)	
3	Saturday; 25 September	Marshall Arena, (England) Milton Keynes	Fallon Sherrock (97.01)	5 – 3	Deta Hedman (91.61)	
4	Sunday; 26 September	Marshall Arena, (England) Milton Keynes	Lisa Ashton (90.49)	5 – 4	Fallon Sherrock (90.62)	
5	Sunday; 26 September	Marshall Arena, (England) Milton Keynes	Lisa Ashton (89.70)	5 – 2	Fallon Sherrock (85.40)	
6	Sunday; 26 September	Marshall Arena, (England) Milton Keynes	Fallon Sherrock (96.35)	5 – 0	Lisa Ashton (80.28)	
7	Saturday; 23 October	Metrodome, (England) Barnsley	Fallon Sherrock (102.95)	5 – 0	Mikuru Suzuki (81.96)	
8	Saturday; 23 October	Metrodome, (England) Barnsley	Lisa Ashton (93.54)	5 – 3	Fallon Sherrock (92.03)	
9	Saturday; 23 October	Metrodome, (England) Barnsley	Fallon Sherrock (98.33)	5 – 2	Lisa Ashton (86.48)	
10	Sunday; 24 October	Metrodome, (England) Barnsley	Lisa Ashton (81.68)	5 – 0	Anastasia Dobromyslova (76.17)	
11	Sunday; 24 October	Metrodome, (England) Barnsley	Fallon Sherrock (95.60)	5 – 1	Deta Hedman (82.55)	
12	Sunday; 24 October	Metrodome, (England) Barnsley	Mikuru Suzuki (85.38)	5 – 3	Lisa Ashton (90.52)	

== Professional Darts Corporation Nordic & Baltic (PDCNB) ==
Final PDCNB ranking
Rank	Player	Points
1	Madars Razma	3200
2	Daniel Larsson	2725
3	Marko Kantele	2600
4	Andreas Toft Jørgensen	1800
5	Darius Labanauskas	1350
6	Johan Engström	1200
7	Dennis Nilsson	1100
8	Niels Heinsøe	1025
8	Ivan Springborg Poulsen	1025

The PDCNB tour returned in August with five events over three days in Iceland. Latvian PDC Tour Card Holder Madars Razma topped the table after winning two of the five events. He was followed by Swedish tour card holder Daniel Larsson, Marko Kantele of Finland, and the Danish newcomer Andreas Toft Jørgensen, each of the three winning a single event of the tour.

In addition to the three current and one former tour card holder on this ranking, the top three ranked Danish players gained entry via this method to the 2021 Nordic Darts Masters. They would ultimately be joined by Johan Engström to complete the field of eight local players.

In October, it was decided that there would be no more tour dates, and that the PDC would grant two places in the world championship to the top players by ranking, Razma and Larsson.

No.	Date	Venue	Winner	Legs	Runner-up	Ref.
1	Thursday 19 August	Bullseye Darts, (Iceland) Reykjavík	Daniel Larsson (86.23)	6 – 3	Marko Kantele (80.15)	
2	Friday 20 August	Bullseye Darts, (Iceland) Reykjavík	Madars Razma (94.01)	6 – 3	Daniel Larsson (88.93)	
3	Friday 20 August	Bullseye Darts, (Iceland) Reykjavík	Andreas Toft Jørgensen (73.95)	6 – 4	Darius Labanauskas (76.68)	
4	Saturday 21 August	Bullseye Darts, (Iceland) Reykjavík	Marko Kantele (96.20)	6 – 2	Niels Heinsøe (77.57)	
5	Saturday 21 August	Bullseye Darts, (Iceland) Reykjavík	Madars Razma (95.15)	6 – 4	Daniel Larsson (88.93)	

== Dartplayers Australia (DPA) Pro Tour ==
DPA Rankings as of 9 September 2021.
Rank	Player	Points
1	Dave Marland	144
2	Mitchell Clegg	140
3	Koha Kokiri	128
4	Tim Pusey	126
5	Rob Modra	104
6	Justin Frey	102
6	Bailey Marsh	102
8	Stuart Coburn	100
9	Brandon Weening	92
9	Brody Klinge	92
11	Peter Wilmott	90
12	Sam Ballinger	88
13	Robbie King	84
13	Laurence Ryder	84
15	Andy Pinder	76
16	Lucas Cameron	72
16	Bill Aitken	72
16	Ricky Pickett	72
19	Blake Hatchett	68
20	Raymond O'Donnell	66

The Dartplayers Australia Tour was modified to reduce the amount of travel required within the context of the global pandemic. The Tour consisted of seven regional bubbles spread over the six states and the Australian Capital Territory, with the top eight players from each State qualifying for the World Championship qualifier, along with eight players from a final knockout qualifier. Events in Tasmania were subsequently cancelled.

=== Queensland Bubble ===
No.	Date	Venue	Winner	Legs	Runner-up	Ref.
1	Saturday 6 February	Pine Rivers Darts Club, (Queensland) Brisbane	(79.80) Raymond O'Donnell	5 – 4	Jeremy Fagg (78.23)	
2	Sunday 7 February	Pine Rivers Darts Club, (Queensland) Brisbane	(84.44) Brendon McCausland	5 – 0	Matt Mullen (79.93)	
3	Saturday 6 March	Pine Rivers Darts Club, (Queensland) Brisbane	(87.42) Robbie King	5 – 1	Raymond Smith (82.18)	
4	Sunday 7 March	Pine Rivers Darts Club, (Queensland) Brisbane	(75.25) Shaun Kopecki	5 – 1	Robbie King (74.74)	
5	Saturday 1 May	Pine Rivers Darts Club, (Queensland) Brisbane	(81.36) Robbie King	5 – 2	Mick Lacey (80.32)	
6	Sunday 2 May	Pine Rivers Darts Club, (Queensland) Brisbane	(83.45) James Bailey	5 – 1	Mick Lacey (77.68)	
7	Saturday 5 June	Pine Rivers Darts Club, (Queensland) Brisbane	(79.54) Bill Aitken	5 – 3	Ky Smith (75.56)	
8	Sunday 6 June	Pine Rivers Darts Club, (Queensland) Brisbane	(92.54) Matt Mullen	5 – 2	Mick Lacey (83.81)	
9	Saturday 16 October	Pine Rivers Darts Club, (Queensland) Brisbane	(83.22) Raymond Smith	5 – 4	James Bailey (82.11)	
10	Sunday 17 October	Pine Rivers Darts Club, (Queensland) Brisbane	(86.28) Jeremy Fagg	5 – 2	Shaun Kopecki (75.57)	

=== New South Wales Bubble ===
No.	Date	Venue	Winner	Legs	Runner-up	Ref.
1	Saturday 6 February	Warilla Bowls Club, (New South Wales) Barrack Heights	(73.75) Dave Marland	5 – 1	Liam McLennan (63.00)	
2	Sunday 7 February	Warilla Bowls Club, (New South Wales) Barrack Heights	(75.75) Mitchell Clegg	5 – 2	Dave Marland (70.79)	
3	Saturday 6 March	Warilla Bowls Club, (New South Wales) Barrack Heights	(79.38) Brendan Porter	5 – 1	Peter Wilmott (66.59)	
4	Sunday 7 March	Warilla Bowls Club, (New South Wales) Barrack Heights	(84.56) Dave Marland	5 – 1	Mitchell Clegg (72.00)	
5	Saturday 17 April	Warilla Bowls Club, (New South Wales) Barrack Heights	(74.94) Mitchell Clegg	5 – 3	Justin Frey (71.14)	
6	Sunday 18 April	Warilla Bowls Club, (New South Wales) Barrack Heights	(82.68) Dave Marland	5 – 4	Justin Frey (78.88)	
7	Saturday 15 May	Warilla Bowls Club, (New South Wales) Barrack Heights	(80.10) Dave Marland	5 – 2	Mitchell Clegg (78.27)	
8	Sunday 16 May	Warilla Bowls Club, (New South Wales) Barrack Heights	(75.68) Mitchell Clegg	5 – 1	Justin Frey (73.65)	
9	Saturday 19 June	Warilla Bowls Club, (New South Wales) Barrack Heights	(87.92) Dave Marland	5 – 4	Mitchell Clegg (84.69)	
10	Sunday 20 June	Warilla Bowls Club, (New South Wales) Barrack Heights	(75.15) Dave Marland	5 – 2	Justin Frey (76.60)	

=== ACT Bubble ===
No.	Date	Venue	Winner	Legs	Runner-up	Ref.
1	Saturday 13 March	Young Services Club, (New South Wales) Young	(69.59) Jake Buckley	5 – 3	Bryson Williams (66.30)	
2	Sunday 14 March	Young Services Club, (New South Wales) Young	(75.21) Greg Le'Strange	5 – 3	Mathew Leahy (69.97)	
3	Saturday 10 April	Young Services Club, (New South Wales) Young	(79.11) Mathew Leahy	5 – 0	Pat Molloy (71.73)	
4	Sunday 11 April	Young Services Club, (New South Wales) Young	(70.32) Bryson Williams	5 – 4	Josh Townsend (68.35)	

=== Victoria Bubble ===
No.	Date	Venue	Winner	Legs	Runner-up	Ref.
1	Saturday 6 February	Italian Australian Club, (Victoria (state)) Morwell	(86.94) Stuart Coburn	5 – 1	Sam Ballinger (86.48)	
2	Sunday 7 February	Italian Australian Club, (Victoria (state)) Morwell	(82.25) Brandon Weening	5 – 1	Aaron Simpson (69.28)	
3	Saturday 6 March	Italian Australian Club, (Victoria (state)) Morwell	(86.48) Aaron Simpson	5 – 1	Stuart Coburn (81.24)	
4	Sunday 7 March	Italian Australian Club, (Victoria (state)) Morwell	(74.30) Brody Klinge	5 – 1	Rhys Mathewson (71.66)	
5	Saturday 10 April	Italian Australian Club, (Victoria (state)) Morwell	(84.06) Sam Ballinger	5 – 4	Brody Klinge (81.92)	
6	Sunday 11 April	Italian Australian Club, (Victoria (state)) Morwell	(80.57) Brandon Weening	5 – 1	Brody Klinge (81.20)	
7	Saturday 1 May	Italian Australian Club, (Victoria (state)) Morwell	(80.04) Steve Powell	5 – 2	Lucas Cameron (79.54)	
8	Sunday 2 May	Italian Australian Club, (Victoria (state)) Morwell	(88.41) Brody Klinge	5 – 0	Brandon Weening (61.89)	

=== South Australia Bubble ===
No.	Date	Venue	Winner	Legs	Runner-up	Ref.
1	Saturday 13 March	Kadina Darts Club, (South Australia) Kadina	(72.26) Andy Pinder	5 – 0	John Nottage (64.97)	
2	Sunday 14 March	Kadina Darts Club, (South Australia) Kadina	(77.55) Andy Pinder	5 – 2	Rob Modra (74.27)	
3	Saturday 1 May	Kadina Darts Club, (South Australia) Kadina	(86.38) Rob Modra	5 – 0	Andy Pinder (75.17)	
4	Sunday 2 May	Kadina Darts Club, (South Australia) Kadina	(78.32) Rob Modra	5 – 1	George Creasey (76.95)	
5	Saturday 5 June	Kadina Darts Club, (South Australia) Kadina	(76.70) Rob Modra	5 – 2	Scott Hallett (76.21)	
6	Sunday 6 June	Kadina Darts Club, (South Australia) Kadina	(83.57) Rob Modra	5 – 4	Scott Hallett (84.84)	

=== Western Australia Bubble ===
No.	Date	Venue	Winner	Legs	Runner-up	Ref.
1	Saturday 6 March	Port Kennedy Tavern, (Western Australia) Port Kennedy	(77.47) Tim Pusey	5 – 0	Laurence Ryder (66.39)	
2	Sunday 7 March	Port Kennedy Tavern, (Western Australia) Port Kennedy	(80.37) Koha Kokiri	5 – 1	Tim Pusey (74.49)	
3	Saturday 20 March	Port Kennedy Tavern, (Western Australia) Port Kennedy	(78.14) Tim Pusey	5 – 3	Blake Hatchett (79.88)	
4	Sunday 21 March	Port Kennedy Tavern, (Western Australia) Port Kennedy	(83.48) Bailey Marsh	5 – 3	Koha Kokiri (76.23)	
5	Saturday 15 May	Port Kennedy Tavern, (Western Australia) Port Kennedy	(80.57) Brenton Lloyd	5 – 4	Tim Pusey (77.37)	
6	Sunday 16 May	Port Kennedy Tavern, (Western Australia) Port Kennedy	(82.84) Koha Kokiri	5 – 2	Michael Andre (79.42)	
7	Saturday 12 June	Port Kennedy Tavern, (Western Australia) Port Kennedy	(88.22) Tim Pusey	5 – 1	Koha Kokiri (73.25)	
8	Sunday 13 June	Port Kennedy Tavern, (Western Australia) Port Kennedy	(81.95) Koha Kokiri	5 – 2	Mick Zdun (72.54)	
9	Saturday 17 July	Port Kennedy Tavern, (Western Australia) Port Kennedy	(79.16) Bailey Marsh	5 – 3	Tim Pusey (69.77)	
10	Sunday 18 July	Port Kennedy Tavern, (Western Australia) Port Kennedy	(79.11) Bailey Marsh	5 – 2	Laurence Ryder (62.79)	

=== Oceanic Masters ===
For the first time, on 30 October, the DPA Oceanic Masters was held virtually due to the COVID-19 pandemic. The quarterfinals from the 82 person bracket yielded Ky Smith as the winner, who thus qualified for the PDC World Championship.

Quarterfinals
1	Tim Pusey 83.78	5
Ky Smith 82.93	6
4	Robbie King 81.66	2
5	Rob Modra 84.87	6
Brendon McCausland 99.41	3
7	Raymond Smith 99.60	6
3	James Bailey 89.72	5
6	Bailey Marsh 88.58	6

Semifinals
Ky Smith 87.60	6
5	Rob Modra 82.64	4
7	Raymond Smith 89.38	3
6	Bailey Marsh 84.60	6

Finals
Ky Smith 94.26	6
6	Bailey Marsh 96.84	2

=== DPA Satellite Finals ===
On 31 October, the DPA hosted the virtual satellite finals. The quarterfinals from the 54 person bracket yielded Raymond Smith as the winner. This set history as Smith joined his son Ky, who won the previous day, as the first father and son duo to play at the same PDC World Championship.

Quarterfinals
Chris Krabbe 78.93	5
9	Justin Frey 82.18	6
4	Robbie King 83.91	6
5	Rob Modra 85.04	4
Brendon McCausland 92.15	4
7	Raymond Smith 89.91	6
3	James Bailey 80.57	6
Paul O'Malley 72.09	2

Semifinals
9	Justin Frey 73.48	5
4	Robbie King 79.78	6
7	Raymond Smith 84.86	6
3	James Bailey 80.98	3

Finals
4	Robbie King 85.62	1
7	Raymond Smith 94.44	6

== EuroAsian Darts Corporation (EADC) Pro Tour ==
The EuroAsian Darts Corporation hosted 6 events held over 2 weekends. Dmitriy Gorbunov topped the rankings to secure a place partnering Tour Card Holder Boris Koltsov in the Russia team for the 2021 PDC World Cup of Darts.

No.	Date	Venue	Winner	Legs	Runner-up	Ref.
1	Saturday 27 February	SK Royal Hotel, (Russia) Moscow	Dmitriy Gorbunov	6 – 3	Evgenii Izotov	
2	Saturday 27 February	SK Royal Hotel, (Russia) Moscow	Dmitriy Gorbunov	6 – 5	Evgenii Izotov	
3	Sunday 28 February	SK Royal Hotel, (Russia) Moscow	Aleksei Kadochnikov	6 – 5	Roman Obukhov	
4	Saturday 24 April	SK Royal Hotel, (Russia) Moscow	Evgenii Izotov	6 – 5	Aleksei Kadochnikov	
5	Saturday 24 April	SK Royal Hotel, (Russia) Moscow	Dmitriy Gorbunov	6 – 3	Vitaliy Khohryakov	
6	Sunday 25 April	SK Royal Hotel, (Russia) Moscow	Dmitriy Gorbunov	6 – 3	Evgenii Izotov	

== Championship Darts Corporation (CDC) Pro Tour ==
Final USA Tour points ranking
Rank	Player	Points
1	Danny Lauby	60
2	Leonard Gates	54
3	Gary Mawson	38
4	Chuck Puleo	35
5	Seth Steffano	32
6	Kevin Luke	31
7	Jules van Dongen	30
8	Adam Sevada	26
9	Jeremiah Millar	24
10	Alex Spellman	23

On 10 May 2021, it was announced that the CDC would hold a 2021 tour consisting of six events of a US tour over two blocks of three in the US in July and September, as there was still no guarantees of being able to have both American and Canadian players at the same event. A separate Canadian tour took place in August and October. The final leader of both 2021 Tour rankings earned a place at the World Championships. The top eight players of both 2021 Tour rankings earned a place at the 2021 CDC Continental Cup on 20 November. Danny Lauby Jr. and John Norman Jnr won the USA and Canada titles respectively, and qualified for the 2022 PDC World Darts Championship.

=== USA Tour ===
No.	Date	Venue	Winner	Legs	Runner-up	Ref.
1	Friday 9 July	Tampa Westshore Marriott (United States) Tampa, Florida	Danny Lauby (94.65)	6 – 2	Leonard Gates (91.21)	
2	Saturday 10 July	Tampa Westshore Marriott (United States) Tampa, Florida	Danny Lauby (87.79)	6 – 1	Gary Mawson (78.32)	
3	Sunday 11 July	Tampa Westshore Marriott (United States) Tampa, Florida	Leonard Gates (87.46)	6 – 5	Danny Lauby (92.55)	
4	Friday 17 September	Columbia Social Club (United States) Philadelphia, Pennsylvania	Adam Sevada (89.68)	6 – 4	Stephen Phillips (79.91)	
5	Saturday 18 September	Columbia Social Club (United States) Philadelphia, Pennsylvania	Seth Steffano (91.21)	6 – 4	Jules van Dongen (90.08)	
6	Sunday 19 September	Columbia Social Club (United States) Philadelphia, Pennsylvania	Kevin Luke (93.29)	6 – 3	Jules van Dongen (91.39)	

=== Canada Tour ===
Final Canada Tour points ranking
Rank	Player	Points
1	John Norman Jnr	64
2	Jacob Taylor	60
3	Matt Campbell	56
4	David Cameron	44
5	Dave Richardson	42
6	Kiley Edmunds	38
7	Jeff Smith	36
8	Jim Long	32
9	Shawn Brenneman	24
10	Ben Garner	22

No.	Date	Venue	Winner	Legs	Runner-up	Ref.
1	Friday 13 August	Days Inn & Suites Moncton (Canada) Moncton, New Brunswick	David Cameron (91.49)	6 – 5	Jacob Taylor (97.47)	
2	Saturday 14 August	Days Inn & Suites Moncton (Canada) Moncton, New Brunswick	Matt Campbell (90.41)	6 – 4	Jeff Smith (91.90)	
3	Sunday 15 August	Days Inn & Suites Moncton (Canada) Moncton, New Brunswick	Jeff Smith (94.45)	6 – 4	John Norman Jnr (89.86)	
4	Friday 22 October	Cambridge Newfoundland Club (Canada) Cambridge, Ontario	John Norman Jnr (93.19)	6 – 3	Matt Campbell (90.33)	
5	Saturday 23 October	Cambridge Newfoundland Club (Canada) Cambridge, Ontario	John Norman Jnr (85.41)	6 – 5	Ross Snook (76.10)	
6	Sunday 24 October	Cambridge Newfoundland Club (Canada) Cambridge, Ontario	Jacob Taylor (93.97)	6 – 4	Matt Campbell (83.25)	

=== Continental Cup ===
The CDC Continental Cup was held on 20 November. The tournament featured the top eight players from each of the US Tour and Canadian Tour (with the exception of Canadian No. 3 and 4, Matt Campbell and Dave Richardson who declined their invitation). The winner of Continental Cup earned entry into the 2022 PDC World Darts Championship and the 2022 US Darts Masters.

Round 1
U1	Danny Lauby 76.81	5
C8	Ben Garner 64.18	1
C4	Kiley Edmunds 85.47	5
U5	Seth Steffano 81.02	3
C2	Jacob Taylor 84.94	5
U7	Jules van Dongen 85.17	4
U3	Gary Mawson 91.15	5
C5	Jim Long 93.98	4
C1	John Norman Jnr 96.14	4
U8	Adam Sevada 89.05	5
U4	Chuck Puleo 82.36	2
C5	Jeff Smith 85.75	5
U2	Leonard Gates 77.58	5
C7	Shawn Brenneman 69.34	1
C3	David Cameron 98.17	5
U6	Kevin Luke 90.40	3

Quarterfinals
U1	Danny Lauby 82.95	3
C4	Kiley Edmunds 81.63	6
C2	Jacob Taylor 90.81	6
U3	Gary Mawson 90.67	5
U8	Adam Sevada 86.75	5
C5	Jeff Smith 84.55	6
U2	Leonard Gates 83.59	2
C3	David Cameron 87.02	6

Semifinals
C4	Kiley Edmunds 76.46	5
C2	Jacob Taylor 82.34	7
C5	Jeff Smith 83.03	7
C3	David Cameron 82.85	6

Final
C2	Jacob Taylor 87.80	6
C5	Jeff Smith 81.92	8

== World Championship International Qualifiers ==
Date	Event	Venue	Winner	Score	Runner-up	Ref.
Thursday 22 April	PDC Europe Super League	(Germany) Niedernhausen, H+ Hotel	Martin Schindler (87.90)	11 – 10	Florian Hempel (88.77)	
Saturday 24 July	PDC Asia Philippines Qualifier	(Philippines) Tacloban	Lourence Ilagan (88.67)	3 – 1	Paolo Nebrida (83.86)	
Sunday 10 October	PDJ Qualifier	(Japan) Kobe, Sanbo Hall 2F	Yuki Yamada (89.90)	5 – 4	Masumi Chino (81.67)	
Sunday 17 October	Central/South America Qualifier	(Costa Rica) San José, Radisson Hotel	Diogo Portela (79.54)	6 – 2	Diego Orozco (63.79)	
Sunday 24 October	Africa Qualifier	(South Africa) Goodwood, Club 54	Charles Losper (87.62)	7 – 5	Carl Gabriel (81.92)	
Friday 29 October	PDC China Qualifier	(China)	Lihao Wen (81.53)	4 – 1	Bin Zheng (76.88)	
Saturday 30 October	Oceanic Masters	Australia, 4 venues	Ky Smith (94.26)	6 – 2	Bailey Marsh (96.84)	
Sunday 31 October	DPA Satellite Finals	Australia, 4 venues	Raymond Smith (94.44)	6 – 1	Robbie King (85.62)	
Sunday 31 October	DPNZ Qualifier	(New Zealand) Auckland, Papakura Club	Cancelled (Note: The DPNZ Qualifier was cancelled due to COVID-19 restrictions. Ben Robb, the New Zealand number one, was awarded the World Championship spot.)			
Sunday 31 October	EADC Qualifier	(Russia) Moscow, Maxima Zarya Hotel	Boris Koltsov (81.88)	3 – 2	Evgenii Izotov (83.55)	
Sunday 7 November	India Qualifier	(India) Gujarat, Surat Tennis Club	Nitin Kumar (82.73)	6 – 0	Vikehelie Suohu (76.35)	
Sunday 7 November	PDC Asia Japan Qualifier	(Japan)	Toyokazu Shibata (95.42)	7 – 1	Shunpei Noge (86.75)	
Sunday 7 November	PDC Asia Thailand Qualifier	(Thailand)	Cancelled (Note: The Thailand Qualifier was cancelled due to COVID-19 restrictions, and replaced with the CDC Continental Cup)			
Saturday 13 November	Western Europe Qualifier	(Netherlands) Leeuwarden, Westcord WTC Hotel	Chris Landman (81.57)	6 – 2	Mats Gies (77.91)	
Saturday 13 November	East Europe Qualifier	(Hungary) Budapest, Novotel	Roman Benecký (86.26)	6 – 2	Karel Sedláček (90.74)	
Sunday 14 November	PDC Asia Hong Kong Qualifier	Hong Kong, LaLa Bar	Royden Lam (81.36)	5 – 4	Man Lok Leung (83.01)	
Sunday 14 November	PDC Asia Singapore Qualifier	Singapore, Forest3 Darts Cafe	Paul Lim (86.37)	5 – 3	Harith Lim (78.03)	
Saturday 20 November	South-West Europe Qualifier	(Spain) Ávila, Lienzo Norte Congress and Exhibition Center	Juan Rodriguez (85.62)	6 – 4	Toni Alcinas (82.78)	
Saturday 20 November	South-East Europe Qualifier	(Austria) Eisenstadt, ASKÖ Dartclub Burgenland	John Michael (91.30)	6 – 3	Michael Rasztovits (87.32)	
Saturday 20 November	CDC Continental Cup	(United States) New York City	Jeff Smith (81.92)	8 – 6	Jacob Taylor (87.80)	
Sunday 28 November	World Youth Championship (Note: As World Youth Champion Ted Evetts qualified for the World Championship via the Order of Merit rankings, a third space was made available for the PDPA Qualifier.)	(England) Minehead, Butlins	Ted Evetts (95.44)	6 – 4	Nathan Rafferty (93.66)	
Monday 29 November	PDPA Qualifier	(England) Barnsley, Metrodome	James Wilson (90.91)	7 – 5	Mike De Decker (89.25)	
Monday 29 November	PDPA Qualifier	(England) Barnsley, Metrodome	Boris Krčmar (83.82)	7 – 3	Peter Hudson (79.87)	
Monday 29 November	PDPA Qualifier	(England) Barnsley, Metrodome	Nick Kenny (94.08)	7 – 3	Gordon Mathers (89.98)	
