= 2021 Grand Slam of Darts =

2021 Cazoo Grand Slam of Darts

Tournament information
- Dates: 13–21 November 2021
- Venue: Aldersley Leisure Village
- Location: Aldersley, Wolverhampton
- Country: England
- Organisation(s): PDC
- Format: Legs
- Prize fund: £550,000
- Winner's share: £125,000
- High checkout: 170 Fallon Sherrock; Rowby-John Rodriguez; Michael van Gerwen; Michael Smith; Peter Wright

Champion(s)
- (Wales) Gerwyn Price

The 2021 Cazoo Grand Slam of Darts was the fifteenth staging of the Grand Slam of Darts, organised by the Professional Darts Corporation. The event returned to the Aldersley Leisure Village, Wolverhampton between 13–21 November 2021, after being held behind closed doors at the Ricoh Arena, Coventry in 2020.

José de Sousa was the defending champion, after defeating James Wade 16–12 in the 2020 final, but he was eliminated in the second round, losing 10–9 to Peter Wright.

Gerwyn Price won the tournament for the third time in four years, defeating Peter Wright 16–8 in the final.

Due to the dissolution of the British Darts Organisation in 2020, there was no BDO/WDF representation for the first time in the event's history.

During her 5–0 victory over Mike De Decker in the group stage, Fallon Sherrock averaged 101.55, setting a new record for the highest televised average by a woman. She then went on to become the first woman to advance to the knockout stage, where she defeated Mensur Suljović in the second round, before losing to Peter Wright in the quarterfinals.

Michael van Gerwen set a new Grand Slam record average of 115.19 during his 5–2 victory over Joe Cullen, surpassing the record set by Dimitri Van den Bergh the previous year.

== Prize money ==
The prize fund for the Grand Slam was the same as 2019 and 2020, with the winner receiving £125,000.

Position (num. of players)		Prize money (Total: £550,000)
Winner	(1)	£125,000
Runner-up	(1)	£65,000
Semi-finalists	(2)	£40,000
Quarter-finalists	(4)	£20,000
Last 16	(8)	£10,000
Third in group	(8)	£7,500
Fourth in group	(8)	£4,000
Group winner bonus	(8)	£3,500

== Qualifying ==
The qualification criteria changed again for the 2021 tournament, as there were no Summer, Autumn or Winter Series events, as well as no Home Tour, and no events organized by the BDO, which dissolved in 2020. The addition of qualifiers from the PDC Challenge and Development Tours replaced BDO representation.

On 11 November, it was announced that Dimitri Van den Bergh had tested positive for COVID-19, ruling him out of the tournament. He was replaced by Chris Dobey, who was next on the list of qualifying criteria.

The qualifiers were:

=== Qualifying Tournaments ===
PDC Main Tournaments
Tournament	Year	Position	Player	Qualifiers
PDC World Darts Championship	2021	Winner	Gerwyn Price	Gerwyn Price; José de Sousa; Jonny Clayton; Peter Wright; James Wade; Rob Cross; Michael van Gerwen; John Henderson; Gary Anderson; ~~Dimitri Van den Bergh~~; Mervyn King; Luke Humphries; Mensur Suljović; Rowby-John Rodriguez
Grand Slam of Darts	2020	Winner	José de Sousa	Gerwyn Price; José de Sousa; Jonny Clayton; Peter Wright; James Wade; Rob Cross; Michael van Gerwen; John Henderson; Gary Anderson; ~~Dimitri Van den Bergh~~; Mervyn King; Luke Humphries; Mensur Suljović; Rowby-John Rodriguez
Premier League Darts	2021	Winner	Jonny Clayton	Gerwyn Price; José de Sousa; Jonny Clayton; Peter Wright; James Wade; Rob Cross; Michael van Gerwen; John Henderson; Gary Anderson; ~~Dimitri Van den Bergh~~; Mervyn King; Luke Humphries; Mensur Suljović; Rowby-John Rodriguez
World Matchplay	2021	Winner	Peter Wright	Gerwyn Price; José de Sousa; Jonny Clayton; Peter Wright; James Wade; Rob Cross; Michael van Gerwen; John Henderson; Gary Anderson; ~~Dimitri Van den Bergh~~; Mervyn King; Luke Humphries; Mensur Suljović; Rowby-John Rodriguez
World Grand Prix	2021	Winner	Jonny Clayton	Gerwyn Price; José de Sousa; Jonny Clayton; Peter Wright; James Wade; Rob Cross; Michael van Gerwen; John Henderson; Gary Anderson; ~~Dimitri Van den Bergh~~; Mervyn King; Luke Humphries; Mensur Suljović; Rowby-John Rodriguez
Masters	2021	Winner	Jonny Clayton	Gerwyn Price; José de Sousa; Jonny Clayton; Peter Wright; James Wade; Rob Cross; Michael van Gerwen; John Henderson; Gary Anderson; ~~Dimitri Van den Bergh~~; Mervyn King; Luke Humphries; Mensur Suljović; Rowby-John Rodriguez
UK Open	2021	Winner	James Wade	Gerwyn Price; José de Sousa; Jonny Clayton; Peter Wright; James Wade; Rob Cross; Michael van Gerwen; John Henderson; Gary Anderson; ~~Dimitri Van den Bergh~~; Mervyn King; Luke Humphries; Mensur Suljović; Rowby-John Rodriguez
European Championship	2021	Winner	Rob Cross	Gerwyn Price; José de Sousa; Jonny Clayton; Peter Wright; James Wade; Rob Cross; Michael van Gerwen; John Henderson; Gary Anderson; ~~Dimitri Van den Bergh~~; Mervyn King; Luke Humphries; Mensur Suljović; Rowby-John Rodriguez
Players Championship Finals	2020	Winner	Michael van Gerwen	Gerwyn Price; José de Sousa; Jonny Clayton; Peter Wright; James Wade; Rob Cross; Michael van Gerwen; John Henderson; Gary Anderson; ~~Dimitri Van den Bergh~~; Mervyn King; Luke Humphries; Mensur Suljović; Rowby-John Rodriguez
World Series of Darts Finals	2021	Winner	Jonny Clayton	Gerwyn Price; José de Sousa; Jonny Clayton; Peter Wright; James Wade; Rob Cross; Michael van Gerwen; John Henderson; Gary Anderson; ~~Dimitri Van den Bergh~~; Mervyn King; Luke Humphries; Mensur Suljović; Rowby-John Rodriguez
PDC World Cup of Darts	2021	Winners	Peter Wright; John Henderson	Gerwyn Price; José de Sousa; Jonny Clayton; Peter Wright; James Wade; Rob Cross; Michael van Gerwen; John Henderson; Gary Anderson; ~~Dimitri Van den Bergh~~; Mervyn King; Luke Humphries; Mensur Suljović; Rowby-John Rodriguez
PDC World Darts Championship	2021	Runner-up	Gary Anderson	Gerwyn Price; José de Sousa; Jonny Clayton; Peter Wright; James Wade; Rob Cross; Michael van Gerwen; John Henderson; Gary Anderson; ~~Dimitri Van den Bergh~~; Mervyn King; Luke Humphries; Mensur Suljović; Rowby-John Rodriguez
Grand Slam of Darts	2020	Runner-up	James Wade	Gerwyn Price; José de Sousa; Jonny Clayton; Peter Wright; James Wade; Rob Cross; Michael van Gerwen; John Henderson; Gary Anderson; ~~Dimitri Van den Bergh~~; Mervyn King; Luke Humphries; Mensur Suljović; Rowby-John Rodriguez
Premier League Darts	2021	Runner-up	José de Sousa	Gerwyn Price; José de Sousa; Jonny Clayton; Peter Wright; James Wade; Rob Cross; Michael van Gerwen; John Henderson; Gary Anderson; ~~Dimitri Van den Bergh~~; Mervyn King; Luke Humphries; Mensur Suljović; Rowby-John Rodriguez
World Matchplay	2021	Runner-up	~~Dimitri Van den Bergh~~	Gerwyn Price; José de Sousa; Jonny Clayton; Peter Wright; James Wade; Rob Cross; Michael van Gerwen; John Henderson; Gary Anderson; ~~Dimitri Van den Bergh~~; Mervyn King; Luke Humphries; Mensur Suljović; Rowby-John Rodriguez
World Grand Prix	2021	Runner-up	Gerwyn Price	Gerwyn Price; José de Sousa; Jonny Clayton; Peter Wright; James Wade; Rob Cross; Michael van Gerwen; John Henderson; Gary Anderson; ~~Dimitri Van den Bergh~~; Mervyn King; Luke Humphries; Mensur Suljović; Rowby-John Rodriguez
Masters	2021	Runner-up	Mervyn King	Gerwyn Price; José de Sousa; Jonny Clayton; Peter Wright; James Wade; Rob Cross; Michael van Gerwen; John Henderson; Gary Anderson; ~~Dimitri Van den Bergh~~; Mervyn King; Luke Humphries; Mensur Suljović; Rowby-John Rodriguez
UK Open	2021	Runner-up	Luke Humphries	Gerwyn Price; José de Sousa; Jonny Clayton; Peter Wright; James Wade; Rob Cross; Michael van Gerwen; John Henderson; Gary Anderson; ~~Dimitri Van den Bergh~~; Mervyn King; Luke Humphries; Mensur Suljović; Rowby-John Rodriguez
European Championship	2021	Runner-up	Michael van Gerwen	Gerwyn Price; José de Sousa; Jonny Clayton; Peter Wright; James Wade; Rob Cross; Michael van Gerwen; John Henderson; Gary Anderson; ~~Dimitri Van den Bergh~~; Mervyn King; Luke Humphries; Mensur Suljović; Rowby-John Rodriguez
Players Championship Finals	2020	Runner-up	Mervyn King	Gerwyn Price; José de Sousa; Jonny Clayton; Peter Wright; James Wade; Rob Cross; Michael van Gerwen; John Henderson; Gary Anderson; ~~Dimitri Van den Bergh~~; Mervyn King; Luke Humphries; Mensur Suljović; Rowby-John Rodriguez
World Series of Darts Finals	2021	Runner-up	~~Dimitri Van den Bergh~~	Gerwyn Price; José de Sousa; Jonny Clayton; Peter Wright; James Wade; Rob Cross; Michael van Gerwen; John Henderson; Gary Anderson; ~~Dimitri Van den Bergh~~; Mervyn King; Luke Humphries; Mensur Suljović; Rowby-John Rodriguez
PDC World Cup of Darts	2021	Runners-Up	Mensur Suljović; Rowby-John Rodriguez	Gerwyn Price; José de Sousa; Jonny Clayton; Peter Wright; James Wade; Rob Cross; Michael van Gerwen; John Henderson; Gary Anderson; ~~Dimitri Van den Bergh~~; Mervyn King; Luke Humphries; Mensur Suljović; Rowby-John Rodriguez
Note: Players in italics had already qualified for the tournament.				Gerwyn Price; José de Sousa; Jonny Clayton; Peter Wright; James Wade; Rob Cross; Michael van Gerwen; John Henderson; Gary Anderson; ~~Dimitri Van den Bergh~~; Mervyn King; Luke Humphries; Mensur Suljović; Rowby-John Rodriguez

Since the list of qualifiers from the main tournaments produced fewer than the required number of 16 players, the field was to be filled from the reserve lists. The first list consisted of the winners from 2021 European Tour events, with the winners ordered based on Order of Merit position at the cut-off date. However, Gerwyn Price, who had already qualified, won both European Tour events, and thus this list produced no new competitors.

PDC European Tour
Tournament	Event	Position	Player	Qualifiers
2021 European Tour
2021 European Tour	Hungarian Darts Trophy	Winner	Gerwyn Price	
2021 European Tour	Gibraltar Darts Trophy	Winner	Gerwyn Price	
Note: Players in italics had already qualified for the tournament.

Since there were still fewer than 16 qualifiers after European Tour champions were included, the players with the most 2021 Players Championship titles were added. Order of Merit position served as a tiebreaker.

PDC Pro Tour
Tournament	Event	Position	Player	Qualifiers
2021 PDC Pro Tour
2021 PDC Pro Tour	Players Championship 1	Winner	Joe Cullen	Michael Smith; Joe Cullen; Chris Dobey
2021 PDC Pro Tour	Players Championship 2	Winner	Callan Rydz	Michael Smith; Joe Cullen; Chris Dobey
2021 PDC Pro Tour	Players Championship 3	Winner	Raymond van Barneveld	Michael Smith; Joe Cullen; Chris Dobey
2021 PDC Pro Tour	Players Championship 4	Winner	Jonny Clayton	Michael Smith; Joe Cullen; Chris Dobey
2021 PDC Pro Tour	Players Championship 5	Winner	Brendan Dolan	Michael Smith; Joe Cullen; Chris Dobey
2021 PDC Pro Tour	Players Championship 6	Winner	Gerwyn Price	Michael Smith; Joe Cullen; Chris Dobey
2021 PDC Pro Tour	Players Championship 7	Winner	Jonny Clayton (2)	Michael Smith; Joe Cullen; Chris Dobey
2021 PDC Pro Tour	Players Championship 8	Winner	Peter Wright	Michael Smith; Joe Cullen; Chris Dobey
2021 PDC Pro Tour	Players Championship 9	Winner	José de Sousa	Michael Smith; Joe Cullen; Chris Dobey
2021 PDC Pro Tour	Players Championship 10	Winner	Michael Smith	Michael Smith; Joe Cullen; Chris Dobey
2021 PDC Pro Tour	Players Championship 11	Winner	Dirk van Duijvenbode	Michael Smith; Joe Cullen; Chris Dobey
2021 PDC Pro Tour	Players Championship 12	Winner	Dimitri Van den Bergh	Michael Smith; Joe Cullen; Chris Dobey
2021 PDC Pro Tour	Players Championship 13	Winner	Joe Cullen (2)	Michael Smith; Joe Cullen; Chris Dobey
2021 PDC Pro Tour	Players Championship 14	Winner	José de Sousa (2)	Michael Smith; Joe Cullen; Chris Dobey
2021 PDC Pro Tour	Players Championship 15	Winner	José de Sousa (3)	Michael Smith; Joe Cullen; Chris Dobey
2021 PDC Pro Tour	Players Championship 16	Winner	Peter Wright (2)	Michael Smith; Joe Cullen; Chris Dobey
2021 PDC Pro Tour	Players Championship 17	Winner	Stephen Bunting	Michael Smith; Joe Cullen; Chris Dobey
2021 PDC Pro Tour	Players Championship 18	Winner	Chris Dobey	Michael Smith; Joe Cullen; Chris Dobey
2021 PDC Pro Tour	Players Championship 19	Winner	Ross Smith	Michael Smith; Joe Cullen; Chris Dobey
2021 PDC Pro Tour	Players Championship 20	Winner	Peter Wright (3)	Michael Smith; Joe Cullen; Chris Dobey
2021 PDC Pro Tour	Players Championship 21	Winner	Gerwyn Price (2)	Michael Smith; Joe Cullen; Chris Dobey
2021 PDC Pro Tour	Players Championship 22	Winner	Ryan Searle	Michael Smith; Joe Cullen; Chris Dobey
2021 PDC Pro Tour	Players Championship 23	Winner	Peter Wright (4)	Michael Smith; Joe Cullen; Chris Dobey
2021 PDC Pro Tour	Players Championship 24	Winner	Dimitri Van den Bergh (2)	Michael Smith; Joe Cullen; Chris Dobey
2021 PDC Pro Tour	Players Championship 25	Winner	Callan Rydz (2)	Michael Smith; Joe Cullen; Chris Dobey
2021 PDC Pro Tour	Players Championship 26	Winner	Rob Cross	Michael Smith; Joe Cullen; Chris Dobey
2021 PDC Pro Tour	Players Championship 27	Winner	Michael Smith (2)	Michael Smith; Joe Cullen; Chris Dobey
2021 PDC Pro Tour	Players Championship 28	Winner	Chris Dobey (2)	Michael Smith; Joe Cullen; Chris Dobey
2021 PDC Pro Tour	Players Championship 29	Winner	Michael van Gerwen	Michael Smith; Joe Cullen; Chris Dobey
2021 PDC Pro Tour	Players Championship 30	Winner	Krzysztof Ratajski	Michael Smith; Joe Cullen; Chris Dobey
Note: Players in italics had already qualified for the tournament.				Michael Smith; Joe Cullen; Chris Dobey

=== PDC Qualifying Event ===
A further eight places in the Grand Slam of Darts were filled by winners of a qualifying event on 5 November.

These are the qualifiers:

- Mike De Decker
- Gabriel Clemens
- Stephen Bunting
- Raymond van Barneveld
- Martin Schindler
- Ryan Joyce
- Krzysztof Ratajski
- Boris Krčmar

=== Additional qualifiers ===
The winners of these tournaments and tours also qualified for the tournament, in place of BDO/WDF representation.

Tournament	Year	Position	Player
PDC World Youth Championship	2020	Winner	Bradley Brooks
PDC World Youth Championship	2020	Runner-up	Joe Davis
PDC UK Challenge Tour	2021	Winner	Jim Williams
PDC European Challenge Tour	2021	Winner	Matt Campbell
PDC UK Development Tour	2021	Winner	Nathan Rafferty (Note: Rafferty qualified as 2nd of the Development Tour Order of Merit after Bradley Brooks was already qualified.)
PDC European Development Tour	2021	Winner	Rusty-Jake Rodriguez
PDC Women's Series	2021	Events 1–6 Winner	Fallon Sherrock
PDC Women's Series	2021	Events 7–12 Winner	Lisa Ashton (Note: Ashton qualified as 2nd of the Women's Series 7–12 Order of Merit after Fallon Sherrock was already qualified.)

== Draw ==
The draw was made on 5 November, with the players split into 4 pools based on their current world ranking.

=== Pools ===
One player from each non-seeded pool was drawn into a group with a seeded player. The players are listed with their world ranking at the time of the draw.

Pool A	Pool B	Pool C	Pool D
(PDC Seeded Players)	(PDC Tournament Finalists & Qualifiers)		
Gerwyn Price (1); Peter Wright (2); Michael van Gerwen (3); James Wade (4); Chris Dobey (Alt) (Note: Chris Dobey replaced Dimitri Van den Bergh, who was previously the Number 5 seed.); Gary Anderson (6); José de Sousa (7); Jonny Clayton (8)	Michael Smith; Rob Cross; Krzysztof Ratajski; Joe Cullen; Stephen Bunting; Mervyn King; Gabriel Clemens; Luke Humphries	Mensur Suljović; Ryan Joyce; John Henderson; Boris Krčmar; Mike De Decker; Martin Schindler; Raymond van Barneveld; Bradley Brooks	Lisa Ashton; Rowby-John Rodriguez; Jim Williams; Matt Campbell; Joe Davis; Nathan Rafferty; Fallon Sherrock; Rusty-Jake Rodriguez (Note: Rusty-Jake Rodriguez was not confirmed to qualify as the European Development Tour winner until after the group stage draw.)

=== Group stage ===
All group matches are best of nine legs
After three games, the top two in each group qualify for the knock-out stage

NB: P = Played; W = Won; L = Lost; LF = Legs for; LA = Legs against; +/− = Plus/minus record, in relation to legs; Pts = Points; Status = Qualified to knockout stage

==== Group A ====
Standings Table
Pos.	Player	P	W	L	LF	LA	+/−	Pts	Status
1	Gerwyn Price (1)	3	2	1	14	9	+5	4	Q
2	Nathan Rafferty	3	2	1	14	11	+3	4	Q
3	Krzysztof Ratajski (Q)	3	1	2	9	11	–2	2	Eliminated
4	Martin Schindler (Q)	3	1	2	8	14	–6	2	Eliminated

13 November

Krzysztof Ratajski 94.91	5–1	Martin Schindler 81.49
Gerwyn Price 99.05	5–4	Nathan Rafferty 95.18

14 November

Martin Schindler 90.22	2–5	Nathan Rafferty 89.32
Gerwyn Price 96.35	5–0	Krzysztof Ratajski 93.78

15 November

Gerwyn Price 95.39	4–5	Martin Schindler 101.66
Krzysztof Ratajski 88.12	4–5	Nathan Rafferty 86.37

==== Group B ====
Standings Table
Pos.	Player	P	W	L	LF	LA	+/−	Pts	Status
1	Jonny Clayton (8)	3	3	0	15	10	+5	6	Q
2	Bradley Brooks	3	2	1	13	9	+4	4	Q
3	Mervyn King	3	1	2	10	14	–4	2	Eliminated
4	Rusty-Jake Rodriguez	3	0	3	10	15	–5	0	Eliminated

13 November

Mervyn King 82.76	1–5	Bradley Brooks 88.98
Jonny Clayton 101.50	5–3	Rusty-Jake Rodriguez 94.38

14 November

Mervyn King 99.95	5–4	Rusty-Jake Rodriguez 89.93
Jonny Clayton 103.43	5–3	Bradley Brooks 95.72

15 November

Bradley Brooks 89.32	5–3	Rusty-Jake Rodriguez 86.47
Jonny Clayton 99.40	5–4	Mervyn King 101.73

==== Group C ====
Standings Table
Pos.	Player	P	W	L	LF	LA	+/−	Pts	Status
1	James Wade (4)	3	2	1	14	9	+5	4	Q
2	Rob Cross	3	2	1	12	8	+4	4	Q
3	Jim Williams	3	2	1	13	10	+3	4	Eliminated
4	Boris Krčmar (Q)	3	0	3	3	15	–12	0	Eliminated

13 November

James Wade 90.02	4–5	Jim Williams 90.97
Rob Cross 96.35	5–0	Boris Krčmar 87.27

14 November

James Wade 95.31	5–2	Boris Krčmar 90.81
Rob Cross 97.10	5–3	Jim Williams 93.79

15 November

Boris Krčmar 87.59	1–5	Jim Williams 88.95
James Wade 111.71	5–2	Rob Cross 101.00

==== Group D ====
Standings Table
Pos.	Player	P	W	L	LF	LA	+/−	Pts	Status
1	Ryan Joyce (Q)	3	2	1	13	10	+3	4	Q
2	Rowby-John Rodriguez	3	2	1	11	9	+2	4	Q
3	Chris Dobey (Alt)	3	1	2	11	13	–2	2	Eliminated
4	Stephen Bunting (Q)	3	1	2	10	13	–3	2	Eliminated

13 November

Stephen Bunting 106.70	4–5	Ryan Joyce 98.41
Chris Dobey 90.05	3–5	Rowby-John Rodriguez 93.63

14 November

Chris Dobey 87.72	3–5	Stephen Bunting 92.40
Ryan Joyce 108.11	5–1	Rowby-John Rodriguez 101.08

15 November

Chris Dobey 97.89	5–3	Ryan Joyce 89.03
Stephen Bunting 98.44	1–5	Rowby-John Rodriguez 104.82

==== Group E ====
Standings Table
Pos.	Player	P	W	L	LF	LA	+/−	Pts	Status
1	Peter Wright (2)	3	2	1	14	6	+8	4	Q
2	Fallon Sherrock	3	2	1	11	8	+3	4	Q
3	Gabriel Clemens (Q)	3	2	1	13	10	+3	4	Eliminated
4	Mike De Decker (Q)	3	0	3	1	15	–14	0	Eliminated

13 November

Gabriel Clemens 96.45	5–1	Mike De Decker 94.09
Peter Wright 96.45	5–1	Fallon Sherrock 90.55

14 November

Mike De Decker 75.83	0–5	Fallon Sherrock 101.55
Peter Wright 91.62	4–5	Gabriel Clemens 98.29

16 November

Peter Wright 88.41	5–0	Mike De Decker 78.07
Gabriel Clemens 93.33	3–5	Fallon Sherrock 93.53

==== Group F ====
Standings Table
Pos.	Player	P	W	L	LF	LA	+/−	Pts	Status
1	Mensur Suljović	3	2	1	14	8	+6	4	Q
2	José de Sousa (7)	3	2	1	13	10	+3	4	Q
3	Luke Humphries	3	2	1	13	11	+2	4	Eliminated
4	Matt Campbell	3	0	3	4	15	–11	0	Eliminated

13 November

José de Sousa 95.81	5–1	Matt Campbell 83.58
Luke Humphries 101.25	3–5	Mensur Suljović 100.61

14 November

Luke Humphries 87.85	5–3	Matt Campbell 87.14
José de Sousa 92.34	5–4	Mensur Suljović 91.57

16 November

Mensur Suljović 105.85	5–0	Matt Campbell 85.39
José de Sousa 90.02	3–5	Luke Humphries 92.32

==== Group G ====
Standings Table
Pos.	Player	P	W	L	LF	LA	+/−	Pts	Status
1	Michael van Gerwen (3)	3	3	0	15	3	+12	6	Q
2	Joe Cullen	3	2	1	12	7	+5	4	Q
3	John Henderson	3	1	2	6	12	–6	2	Eliminated
4	Lisa Ashton	3	0	3	4	15	–11	0	Eliminated

13 November

Michael van Gerwen 105.85	5–0	Lisa Ashton 87.96
Joe Cullen 98.88	5–0	John Henderson 87.88

14 November

John Henderson 91.59	5–2	Lisa Ashton 89.05
Michael van Gerwen 115.19	5–2	Joe Cullen 98.33

16 November

Joe Cullen 93.80	5–2	Lisa Ashton 89.29
Michael van Gerwen 93.94	5–1	John Henderson 86.83

==== Group H ====
Standings Table
Pos.	Player	P	W	L	LF	LA	+/−	Pts	Status
1	Michael Smith	3	3	0	15	9	+6	6	Q
2	Gary Anderson (6)	3	2	1	12	8	+4	4	Q
3	Raymond van Barneveld (Q)	3	1	2	11	10	+1	2	Eliminated
4	Joe Davis	3	0	3	4	15	–11	0	Eliminated

13 November

Gary Anderson 82.39	5–1	Joe Davis 66.95
Michael Smith 100.43	5–4	Raymond van Barneveld 96.48

14 November

Raymond van Barneveld 93.94	5–0	Joe Davis 73.04
Gary Anderson 94.49	2–5	Michael Smith 98.30

16 November

Michael Smith 87.38	5–3	Joe Davis 79.92
Gary Anderson 103.88	5–2	Raymond van Barneveld 98.31

=== Knockout stage ===
Second round (best of 19 legs); 17–18 November
A1	Gerwyn Price (1) 92.97	10
B2	Bradley Brooks 88.35	8
B1	Jonny Clayton (8) 104.30	10
A2	Nathan Rafferty 91.93	2
C1	James Wade (4) 98.09	10
D2	Rowby-John Rodriguez 90.37	2
D1	Ryan Joyce (Q) 95.04	4
C2	Rob Cross 102.91	10
E1	Peter Wright (2) 90.41	10
F2	José de Sousa (7) 93.21	9
F1	Mensur Suljović 84.18	5
E2	Fallon Sherrock 90.58	10
G1	Michael van Gerwen (3) 100.43	10
H2	Gary Anderson (6) 100.68	8
H1	Michael Smith 95.13	10
G2	Joe Cullen 92.04	5

Quarter-finals (best of 31 legs); 19–20 November
A1	Gerwyn Price (1) 98.11	16
B1	Jonny Clayton (8) 99.32	12
C1	James Wade (4) 96.58	16
C2	Rob Cross 96.17	14
E1	Peter Wright (2) 100.33	16
E2	Fallon Sherrock 98.90	13
G1	Michael van Gerwen (3) 97.44	13
H1	Michael Smith 98.70	16

Semi-finals (best of 31 legs); 21 November
A1	Gerwyn Price (1) 102.58	16
C1	James Wade (4) 94.52	9
E1	Peter Wright (2) 100.70	16
H1	Michael Smith 97.34	12

Final (best of 31 legs); 21 November
A1	Gerwyn Price (1) 103.90	16
E1	Peter Wright (2) 91.51	8
