= 2021 World Series of Darts Finals =

2021 Jack's Casino World Series of Darts Finals

Tournament information
- Dates: 29–31 October 2021
- Venue: AFAS Live
- Location: Amsterdam
- Country: Netherlands
- Organisation(s): Professional Darts Corporation (PDC)
- Format: Legs
- Prize fund: £300,000
- Winner's share: £70,000
- High checkout: 170 Jeffrey de Zwaan; Michael van Gerwen

Champion(s)
- Jonny Clayton

The 2021 Jack's Casino World Series of Darts Finals was the seventh staging of the World Series of Darts Finals tournament, organised by the Professional Darts Corporation. The tournament took place at AFAS Live, Amsterdam, Netherlands, from 29 to 31 October 2021. It featured a field of 24 players.

Gerwyn Price was the defending champion, after beating Rob Cross 11–9 in the 2020 final, but lost to compatriot Jonny Clayton in the quarter-finals.

Clayton went on to win the title, defeating Dimitri Van den Bergh 11–6 in the final.

This was the first time the tournament had taken place without any representatives from outside Europe.

== Prize money ==
The prize money remained the same as the previous year.

Position (no. of players)		Prize money (Total: £300,000)
Winner	(1)	£70,000
Runner-up	(1)	£30,000
Semi-finalists	(2)	£20,000
Quarter-finalists	(4)	£15,000
Last 16 (second round)	(8)	£7,500
Last 24 (first round)	(8)	£5,000

== Qualification ==
Due to the COVID-19 pandemic still being prevalent in 2021, only one event took place on the 2021 World Series of Darts, which was the 2021 Nordic Darts Masters.

The eight PDC representatives who reached the quarter-finals of the Nordic Darts Masters were seeded for the World Series of Darts Finals. The other 16 places were filled up by:

- The next 4 players on the PDC Order of Merit (after the World Grand Prix) who hadn't yet qualified
- 4 international representatives
- 4 Dutch representatives, with the event being held in Amsterdam
- 4 players being determined by a qualifier for Tour Card holders held on 18 October at Barnsley Metrodome, Barnsley.

The following players qualified for the tournament:

Invited Seeds
1. Michael van Gerwen (semi-finals)
2. Fallon Sherrock (second round)
3. Dimitri Van den Bergh (runner-up)
4. Jonny Clayton (champion)
5. Gerwyn Price (quarter-finals)
6. Peter Wright (second round)
7. Gary Anderson (second round)
8. Madars Razma (second round)

Order of Merit Players
- James Wade (first round)
- José de Sousa (second round)
- Michael Smith (first round)
- Dave Chisnall (first round)

International Representatives
- Nathan Aspinall (first round)
- Krzysztof Ratajski (semi-finals)
- Gabriel Clemens (first round)
- John Henderson (first round)

Dutch Representatives
- Dirk van Duijvenbode (second round)
- Danny Noppert (first round)
- Vincent van der Voort (second round)
- Jeffrey de Zwaan (first round)

Tour Card Holder Qualifiers
- Niels Zonneveld (quarter-finals)
- Mervyn King (quarter-finals)
- Maik Kuivenhoven (second round)
- Kim Huybrechts (quarter-finals)

== Draw ==
First round (best of 11 legs); 29 October
Q	Maik Kuivenhoven 88.19	6
John Henderson 90.71	2
RQ	James Wade 86.13	0
Q	Mervyn King 115.62	6
Nathan Aspinall 91.60	3
Vincent van der Voort 93.34	6
Jeffrey de Zwaan 86.12	2
Dirk van Duijvenbode 98.55	6
Krzysztof Ratajski 93.89	6
Gabriel Clemens 95.86	3
Q	Niels Zonneveld 88.79	6
RQ	Dave Chisnall 87.04	3
RQ	José de Sousa 103.86	6
Danny Noppert 97.81	2
Q	Kim Huybrechts 98.48	6
RQ	Michael Smith 90.69	3

Second round (best of 11 legs); 30 October
1	Michael van Gerwen 92.92	6
Q	Maik Kuivenhoven 90.02	4
8	Madars Razma 87.36	0
Q	Mervyn King 98.02	6
4	Jonny Clayton 94.17	6
Vincent van der Voort 84.60	1
5	Gerwyn Price 100.28	6
Dirk van Duijvenbode 95.05	2
2	Fallon Sherrock 89.83	1
Krzysztof Ratajski 96.93	6
7	Gary Anderson 93.89	4
Q	Niels Zonneveld 96.97	6
3	Dimitri Van den Bergh 101.21	6
RQ	José de Sousa 95.50	3
6	Peter Wright 91.41	1
Q	Kim Huybrechts 92.32	6

Quarter-finals (best of 19 legs); 31 October
1	Michael van Gerwen 98.97	10
Q	Mervyn King 93.17	5
4	Jonny Clayton 95.52	10
5	Gerwyn Price 97.70	9
Krzysztof Ratajski 91.98	10
Q	Niels Zonneveld 90.12	6
3	Dimitri Van den Bergh 100.30	10
Q	Kim Huybrechts 100.63	8

Semi-finals (best of 21 legs); 31 October
1	Michael van Gerwen 99.32	6
4	Jonny Clayton 101.47	11
Krzysztof Ratajski 92.56	8
3	Dimitri Van den Bergh 96.00	11

Final (best of 21 legs); 31 October
4	Jonny Clayton 101.63	11
3	Dimitri Van den Bergh 101.95	6
