= Jeff Smith (darts player) =

Canadian darts player

Personal information
- Nickname: "The Silencer"
- Born: 6 November 1975 (age 50) Saint John, New Brunswick, Canada
- Home town: Hampton, New Brunswick, Canada

Sport
- Sport: Darts
- Playing since: 1979
- Darts: 21g Cosmo Discovery Label
- Laterality: Right-handed
- Walk-on music: "Summer of '69" by Bryan Adams

Organisation (see split in darts)
- BDO: 2008–2011, 2014–2017, 2019–2020
- PDC: 2012–2013, 2018–2019, 2020–2023 (Tour Card: 2012–2013, 2020–2023)
- Current world ranking: (WDF) 4 ▲1 (17 August 2026)

WDF major events – best performances
- World Championship: Runner-up: 2016
- World Masters: Runner-up: 2025
- World Trophy: Semi-final: 2015

PDC premier events – best performances
- World Championship: Last 64: 2018, 2021
- UK Open: Last 96: 2023
- Grand Slam: Last 16: 2016
- PC Finals: Last 64: 2021
- World Series Finals: Last 16: 2020, 2024

Other tournament wins
- Years
ADO Sunday River Open	2012, 2013, 2014, 2015, 2016
ADO White Mountain Shootout	2012, 2019
Bob Jones Memorial	2016
Canada National Championships	2008, 2024, 2025
Canadian Open	2014, 2019
Halifax Open	2011, 2014, 2016, 2017, 2019
K-W Tri City Open	2017
Las Vegas Classic	2024
Las Vegas Open	2015
MLD Maritime Masters	2011
MLD The Schooner	2011
North American World Series; Qualifier	2018, 2019
Norfolk Darts Festival	2024
PDC North American Championship	2018, 2023
PEI Potato Open	2015
Port City Open	2012
Saint John Port City Open	2015
Seacoast Open	2017, 2018, 2019
WDF World Cup Singles	2017
Witch City Open	2015
CDC Canada Pro Tour	2021
CDC Continental Cup	2021
MODUS Super Series Champions Week	Series 11 (2025)

Jeff Smith (born 6 November 1975) is a Canadian professional darts player who competes in World Darts Federation (WDF) events. He reached the final of the 2016 BDO World Championship, where he finished as runner-up to Scott Waites. He also reached the final of the 2025 WDF World Masters, finishing as runner-up to Jimmy van Schie.

== Career ==
In his first tournament, Smith reached the semi-final of the Canada National Championships in 1996. He won the tournament in 2008 beating Jeff Noble. Smith entered the Professional Darts Corporation Q School in January 2011. He won a PDC tour card on the third and final day by defeating Ross Smith 6–2 in his final match. He took part in the 2013 PDC World Cup of Darts with John Part. In 2014, he returned to the BDO, and won the Halifax Open and the Canadian Open.

He qualified for the 2015 BDO World Darts Championship, and entered the preliminary stage, where he beat Mike Day of New Zealand 3-0, hitting three 100+ checkouts. He then played two-time semi-finalist Wesley Harms in the last 32, winning 3–1 after losing the first set. Smith then beat Gary Robson 4-3 in the last 16, after Robson had recovered from 3-1 down to level the match. In the quarter-finals, Smith caused yet another upset as he beat bookmakers' favourite Robbie Green 5-1, crucially hitting a 160 checkout to win the fourth set, with Green waiting on 56. Smith was beaten 6-0 by fourth seed and eventual champion Scott Mitchell in the semi-finals. Smith followed this good run by reaching the semi-finals of the 2015 BDO World Trophy, losing to Jeffrey de Graaf.

He qualified for the 2016 BDO World Darts Championship, and entered the preliminary stage, where he beat Matthew Medhurst 3–0 with a 130 checkout. He played Martin Adams in the first round, winning 3–0. In the second round, be beat Brian Dawson 4–1. He played Dennis Harbour in the Quarter-Finals, winning 5–2 to reach the Semi-Finals. He played Richard Veenstra and won 6–5 to reach his first Final, where he played Scott Waites. In the final, Smith lost to Waites 7–1. In the post match interview, Smith promised to return next year. He received the runners up cheque of £35,000. In the 2017 BDO World Darts Championship Smith entered in the preliminary round, where he beat Seigo Asada 3–1. In the first round Smith beat Brian Dawson 3–2. In the second round Smith lost 4–1 to Martin Adams.

Smith was a wild card entry into the 2018 PDC World Darts Championship. He hit a 170 checkout on his way to a 2–0 win against Luke Humphries in the preliminary round. In the first round Smith lost 3–0 to Gary Anderson. After his first round defeat in the 2018 PDC World Darts Championship he announced ‘I definitely will be playing Q-school this year, based on the current situation. I owe it to my family and my sponsors to carry on playing, wherever it takes me. I will do just that.’ Smith failed to gain a tour card at Q-School. Smith qualified for the 2019 PDC World Darts Championship by winning the North American Championship, securing his place with a 6–4 win over John Norman Jnr.

On 18 January 2020, Smith regained his PDC Tour Card by beating Seigo Asada 5–4 in the final of day 3 of UK Q-School.

== World Championship results ==
=== BDO ===
- 2015: Semi-final (lost to Scott Mitchell 0–6)
- 2016: Runner-up (lost to Scott Waites 1–7)
- 2017: Second round (lost to Martin Adams 1–4)

=== PDC ===
- 2018: First round (lost to Gary Anderson 0–3)
- 2019: First round (lost to Josh Payne 2–3)
- 2021: Second round (lost to Chris Dobey 2–3)
- 2022: First round (lost to Ross Smith 0–3)
- 2023: First round (lost to Mike De Decker 1–3)

== Career statistics ==
=== Performance timeline ===
BDO

Tournament	1996	2002	2008	2014	2015	2016	2017	2019
BDO Ranked televised events
BDO World Championship	Did not qualify				SF	F	2R	DNP
World Masters	Prel.	1R	2R	4R	3R	5R	3R	5R
BDO World Trophy	Not held			DNQ	SF	1R	2R	DNP

WDF

Tournament	2025
WDF Ranked major/platinum events
WDF World Masters	F

PDC

Tournament	2013	2016	2018	2019	2020	2021	2022	2023	2024
PDC Ranked televised events
PDC World Championship	BDO		1R	1R	DNQ	2R	1R	1R	DNQ
UK Open	Did not qualify				2R	2R	3R	3R	DNP
Grand Slam of Darts	DNQ	2R	Did not qualify						
Players Championship Finals	Did not qualify				WD	1R	Did not qualify		
PDC Non-ranked televised events
PDC World Cup of Darts	2R	Did not qualify			QF	1R	1R	2R	DNQ
World Series of Darts Finals	NH	Did not qualify			2R	DNQ		1R	2R
Career statistics
Year-end ranking	172	NR	206	NR	77	53	64	83	

PDC European Tour

Season	1	2	3	4	5	6	7	8	9	10	11	12	13
2020	BDC; DNQ	GDC; 2R	EDG; DNQ	IDO; DNQ									
2022	IDO; 2R	Did not qualify								HDT; 1R	GDO; 1R	BDO; 1R	GDT; 1R
2023	Did not qualify						BDO; 1R	Did not qualify					GDC; 1R

PDC World Series of Darts

Tournament	2018	2019	2022	2023	2024
US Darts Masters	1R	1R	1R	F	QF

PDC Players Championships

Season	1	2	3	4	5	6	7	8	9	10	11	12	13	14	15	16	17	18	19	20	21	22	23	24	25	26	27	28	29	30	31
2011	Did not participate														ONT; 2R	ONT; 3R	Did not participate														
2012	DNP		REA; 2R	REA; 1R	DNP		BIR; 2R	BIR; 1R	Did not participate																						
2013	WIG; 2R	WIG; 1R	DNP		CRA; 1R	CRA; 1R	BAR; 2R	BAR; 1R	DUB; 1R	DUB; SF	KIL; 2R	KIL; 1R	WIG; 1R	WIG; QF	BAR; 2R	BAR; 1R															
2020	BAR; F	BAR; 4R	WIG; 1R	WIG; 1R	WIG; 2R	WIG; 1R	BAR; 1R	BAR; 2R	MIL; 2R	MIL; 2R	MIL; SF	MIL; 1R	MIL; 1R	NIE; 1R	NIE; 1R	NIE; 1R	NIE; 1R	NIE; 1R	COV; 1R	COV; 2R	COV; 4R	COV; 3R	COV; 1R								
2021	BOL; 2R	BOL; 4R	BOL; 2R	BOL; 3R	MIL; 1R	MIL; 2R	MIL; 4R	MIL; 2R	NIE; 2R	NIE; 1R	NIE; 3R	NIE; 2R	MIL; 2R	MIL; 3R	MIL; 4R	MIL; 1R	COV; 1R	COV; 1R	COV; 4R	COV; 1R	DNP			BAR; 3R	BAR; 4R	BAR; 2R	BAR; 3R	DNP			
2022	BAR; 2R	BAR; 2R	WIG; 1R	WIG; 1R	BAR; 2R	BAR; 1R	NIE; 3R	NIE; 2R	BAR; 1R	BAR; QF	BAR; 1R	BAR; 1R	BAR; 3R	WIG; 1R	WIG; 3R	NIE; 1R	NIE; 1R	BAR; 1R	BAR; 1R	BAR; 1R	BAR; 1R	BAR; 3R	BAR; 2R	BAR; 1R	BAR; 1R	BAR; 4R	BAR; 1R	BAR; 3R	BAR; 1R	BAR; 2R	
2023	BAR; 1R	BAR; 1R	BAR; 2R	BAR; 1R	BAR; 1R	BAR; 1R	HIL; 1R	HIL; 1R	WIG; 1R	WIG; 1R	DNP		HIL; 1R	HIL; 1R	DNP		HIL; QF	HIL; 3R	BAR; 1R	BAR; 1R	BAR; 2R	BAR; 2R	BAR; 1R	BAR; 1R	BAR; 1R	BAR; 2R	BAR; 1R	BAR; 3R	BAR; 1R	BAR; 1R	

Performance Table Legend
W	Won the tournament	F	Finalist	SF	Semifinalist	QF	Quarterfinalist	#R; RR; L#	Lost in # round Round-robin; Last # stage	DQ	Disqualified
DNQ	Did not qualify	DNP	Did not participate	WD	Withdrew	NH	Tournament not held	#R; RR; L#	Lost in # round Round-robin; Last # stage	NYF	Not yet founded

== Career finals ==
=== BDO/WDF major finals: 2 ===
Legend
World Championship (0–1)
World Masters (0–1)

Outcome	No.	Year	Championship	Opponent in the final	Score (Note: (l) = score in legs, (s) = score in sets.)
Runner-up	1.	2016	World Championship	(England) Scott Waites	1–7 (s)
Runner-up	2.	2025	World Masters	(Netherlands) Jimmy van Schie	2–7 (l)

=== PDC World Series finals: 1 ===
Legend
World Series of Darts (0–1)

Outcome	No.	Year	Championship	Opponent in the final	Score
Runner-up	1.	2023	US Darts Masters	Michael van Gerwen	0–8 (l)
