= Fallon Sherrock =

English darts player (born 1994)

Fallon Sherrock MBE
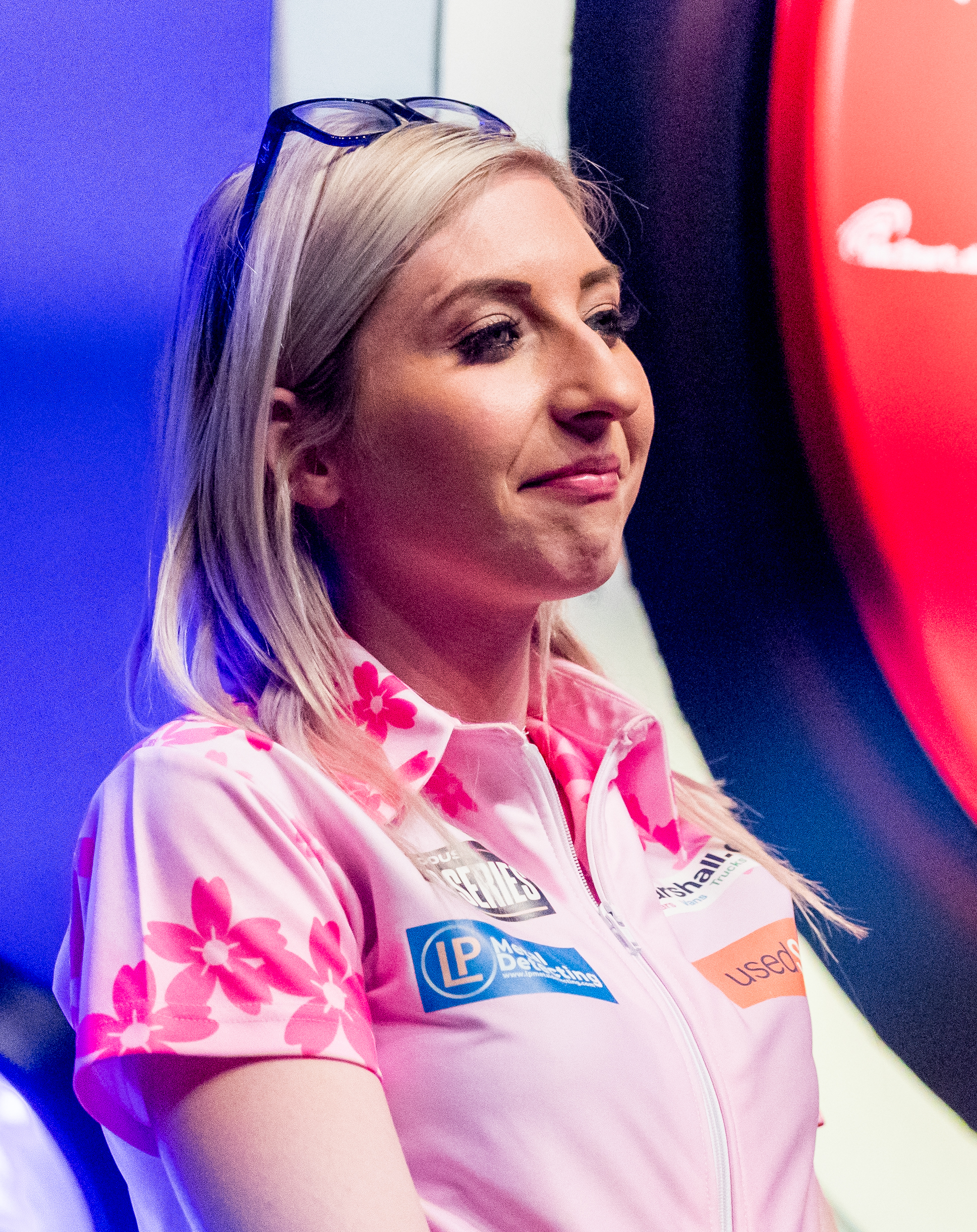
- Sherrock in 2022

Personal information
- Full name: Fallon Suzanne Michelle Sherrock
- Nickname: "Queen of the Palace"
- Born: 2 July 1994 (age 32) Milton Keynes, Buckinghamshire, England

Sport
- Sport: Darts
- Playing since: 2010
- Darts: 24g Winmau Signature
- Laterality: Right-handed
- Walk-on music: "Last Friday Night (T.G.I.F.)" by Katy Perry

Organisation (see split in darts)
- BDO: 2012–2020
- PDC: 2019–
- WDF: 2012–2024; 2026
- Current world ranking: (PDC) NR (5 November 2026)

WDF major events – best performances
- World Championship: Runner-up: 2015
- World Masters: Runner-up: 2014
- World Trophy: Winner (1): 2018
- Finder Masters: Winner (1): 2015

PDC premier events – best performances
- World Championship: Last 32: 2020
- UK Open: Last 160: 2020
- Grand Slam: Quarter-final: 2021
- Premier League: Challenger: 2020
- World Series Finals: Last 16: 2021

Other tournament wins
- Years
Girls World Masters	2012
WDF Girls World Cup	2011
Women's World Matchplay	2022
PDC Women's Series (×21)	2020 (×1); 2021 (×6); 2022 (×3); 2023 (×5); 2024 (×3); 2025 (×2); 2026 (×1)
Beat Luke Littler	2026
Medal record
Women's Darts
Representing England
WDF World Cup
Gold medal – first place	2011 Castlebar	Girls' singles
Gold medal – first place	2011 Castlebar	Mixed youth pairs
Gold medal – first place	2011 Castlebar	Youth overall
Gold medal – first place	2015 Antalya	Women's team
Gold medal – first place	2015 Antalya	Women's overall
Gold medal – first place	2019 Cluj	Women's team
Gold medal – first place	2019 Cluj	Women's overall
WDF Europe Cup
Gold medal – first place	2016 Egmond aan Zee	Women's team
Gold medal – first place	2016 Egmond aan Zee	Women's overall
Gold medal – first place	2018 Budapest	Women's team
Gold medal – first place	2018 Budapest	Women's overall
WDF Europe Cup Youth
Gold medal – first place	2011 Aberdeen	Girls' pairs
Gold medal – first place	2011 Aberdeen	Girls' overall

Fallon Suzanne Michelle Sherrock (born 2 July 1994) is an English professional darts player who competes in both Professional Darts Corporation (PDC) and World Darts Federation (WDF) events and previously participated in British Darts Organisation (BDO) tournaments. She won the 2022 Women's World Matchplay, and reached the final of the 2015 BDO Women's World Darts Championship, where she was runner-up to Lisa Ashton. She has won 21 PDC Women's Series titles, the second-most behind Beau Greaves.

As of September 2026, Sherrock is the only female player to win a match, and subsequently, two consecutive matches at a PDC World Darts Championship. She achieved this at the 2020 World Championships, first by beating Ted Evetts 3–2 in the first round, and then Mensur Suljović 3–1 in the second round, before losing 2–4 to Chris Dobey in the third round. Her feat earned her the nickname "Queen of the Palace" from the name of the venue, the Alexandra Palace.

At the 2021 Nordic Darts Masters, Sherrock became the first woman to reach the final of a PDC televised event, and at the 2021 Grand Slam of Darts, Sherrock became the first woman to reach the quarter-finals of a mixed gender major darts tournament. She defeated Mike De Decker and Gabriel Clemens in the group stage, before beating Suljović to reach the quarter-finals.

== Career ==
=== 2011–2019: Finalist at the BDO World Championship ===
Sherrock was born in Milton Keynes, Buckinghamshire, on 2 July 1994. She began playing darts at the county youth level at the age of 17; her mother and father had played the game on a recreational basis. She played for the Bedfordshire Darts Organisation, and alongside her twin sister Felicia, represented the England youth team in the girls' singles division at the 2011 WDF Europe Youth Cup. Sherrock won the girls' singles at the 2011 WDF World Cup and was the Girls World Masters champion in 2012. The following year, she was victorious in the Women's British Classic. After finishing her A-level examinations, she opted against studying forensic science at university to focus on her darts career.

Sherrock appeared at the BDO World Darts Championship for the first time in January 2014, where she made the quarter-finals. She beat Rilana Erades in her opening match 2–0, but was eliminated by reigning champion Anastasia Dobromyslova in the next round. One year later, she reached the final of the 2015 BDO World Darts Championship. She defeated Maria Mason and Aileen de Graaf, before beating Dobromyslova 2–1 in the semi-finals and scoring five 180s in their match. The youngest finalist in the event's history, Sherrock lost 1–3 to Lisa Ashton, hitting six 180s in the process. Later that year, she beat Dobromyslova 2–0 in the final to win the 2015 Finder Darts Masters. Her 2016 BDO World Championships ended with a first-round defeat to Ann-Louise Peters. She exited both the 2017 and 2018 BDO World Darts Championship after 0–2 quarter-final defeats by Ashton. She defeated Lorraine Winstanley 6–3 to win the 2018 BDO World Trophy, but lost to Ashton in the final of the 2018 Finder Darts Masters. At the 2019 BDO World Darts Championship, she defeated Corrine Hammond in the first round before exiting the competition after a 0–2 defeat by Maria O'Brien in the quarter-finals. During this period of her career, Sherrock represented the England women's team internationally, and helped them win the Women Team event at the WDF World Cup in 2015 and 2019, and at the WDF Europe Cup in 2016 and 2018.

=== 2019–2021: First woman to beat a man at the PDC World Championship ===
In November 2019, Sherrock qualified for the 2020 PDC World Championship at Alexandra Palace, after beating Natalie Gilbert in the final of the UK and Ireland Women's Qualifier. On 17 December 2019, she became the fifth woman to compete at the PDC World Championships, and the first to beat a male player, by winning the final two sets from 1–2 behind to beat Ted Evetts 3–2 in the first round. Afterwards, she said: "I have proved that we can play the men and can beat them." She followed this with a 3–1 win over 11th seed Mensur Suljović in the second round, before losing to 22nd seed Chris Dobey 2–4 in the third round having led 1–0 and 2–1. Her success in the tournament earned her the nickname "Queen of the Palace". On 31 December 2019, Sherrock withdrew from the 2020 BDO World Championship due to 'many factors'. These included late changes to the event such as an anticipated drop in prize money arising from low ticket sales.

In January 2020, Sherrock participated in the pro-am doubles event Die Promi-Darts-WM (Celebrity Darts World Cup). She partnered with former Italian footballer and World Cup winner Luca Toni. She was unsuccessful in her attempt to earn a Tour Card at the 2020 PDC Q School, but the following month, she won the Rileys Wolverhampton qualifier for the 2020 UK Open. In her debut appearance at the competition, she lost to Kyle McKinstry 1–6 in the first round. Sherrock participated in the 2020 Premier League Darts as a 'challenger', appearing at the Nottingham Arena on 13 February 2020, where she drew 6–6 against Glen Durrant. In October, Sherrock failed to qualify for the 2021 PDC World Championship, after finishing third on the 2020 PDC Women's Series Order of Merit. She won the last of the four events, but with only the top two qualifying, she lost out to second-placed Deta Hedman on legs difference.

Sherrock reached the final of the 2021 Nordic Darts Masters. She defeated Niels Heinsøe 6–1 in her opening match, before receiving a walkover in her quarter-final match against Gerwyn Price, who withdrew due to an elbow injury. In the semi-finals she beat world number five Dimitri Van den Bergh 11–10, after initially trailing 3–9. She lost to Michael van Gerwen 7–11 in the final having led 6–3. Sherrock was the first woman in the history of the PDC to reach the final of a TV tournament. One week after her run to the Nordic Masters final, Sherrock competed in the first 2021 Women's Series events. After losing to Lisa Ashton in the last 16 of the first event, she won the next two events with 5–2 and 5–3 victories over Corrine Hammond and Deta Hedman respectively. The following day, Sherrock lost to Ashton in the finals of both events 4 and 5, before whitewashing her in the final of the sixth event. This meant Sherrock maintained her place at the top of the ranking table and secured her debut at the 2021 Grand Slam of Darts.

At the Grand Slam, she defeated Mike De Decker 5–0 in the group stage with a women's record televised average of 101.55. She beat Gabriel Clemens 5–3, closing out the match with a 170 checkout to progress from her group. She then defeated Mensur Suljovic 10–5 to become the first woman to reach the quarter-finals of a major event. She played Peter Wright who eliminated her 16–13.

=== 2022–2024: Women's World Matchplay champion ===
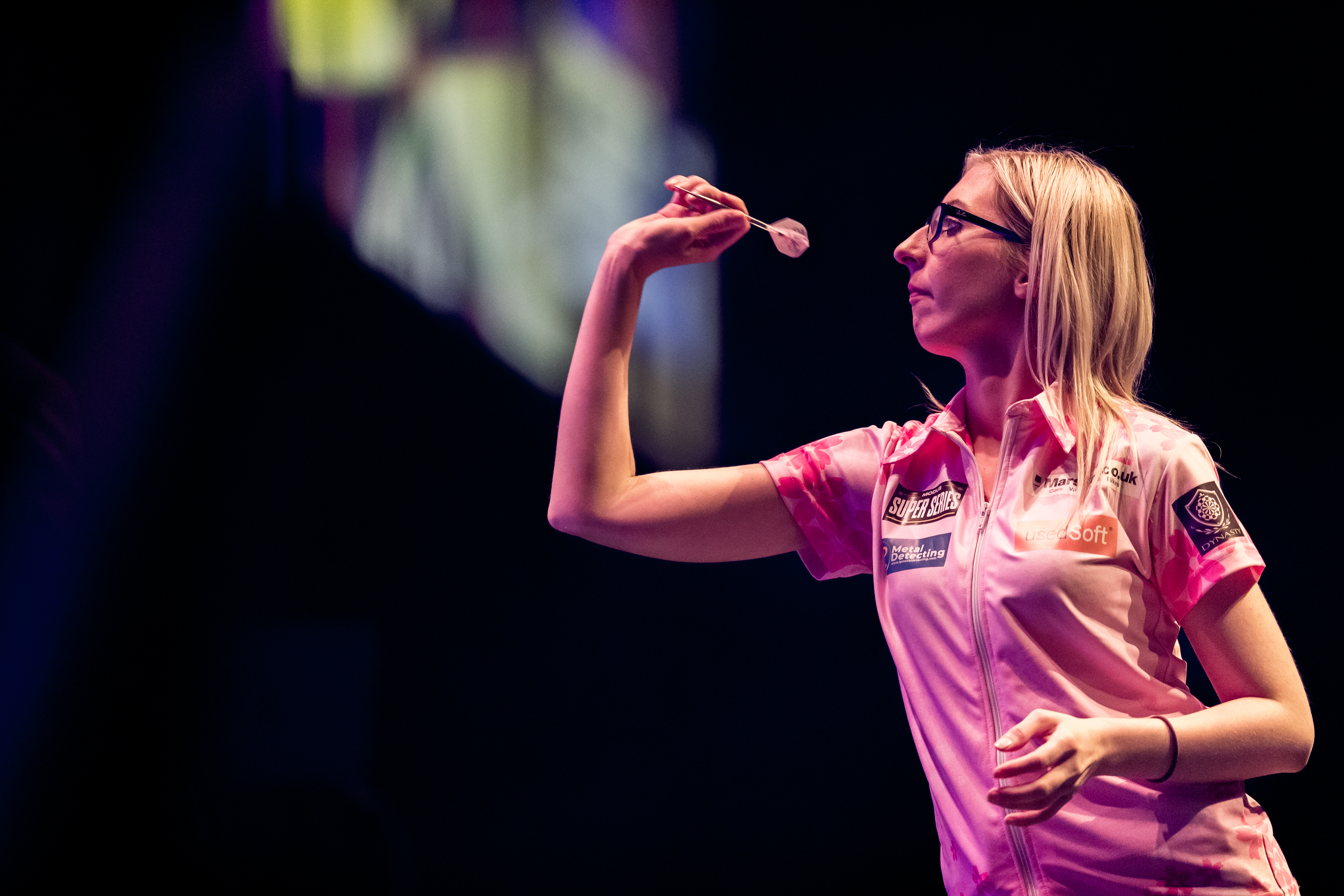
Sherrock during 1.Mannheim Darts Gala in 2022

Sherrock qualified for the 2022 PDC World Championship, after ensuring an overall top-two finish in the 2021 PDC Women's Series. She won three of the first six events, before reaching three successive finals, with victory in the first. At the World Championships, she lost 2–3 to Steve Beaton in the first round, having come back from 0–1 and 1–2 behind to force a deciding set. Her efforts to win a PDC Tour Card at Q School ended following a second-round defeat to Nathan Treadgold on the concluding day.

Sherrock competed in the 2022 World Series of Darts. At the US Darts Masters she lost 2–6 to Leonard Gates in the first round. At the Nordic Darts Masters, she beat Darius Labanauskas 6–1, before losing 10–6 to Michael Smith. She suffered first-round defeats at both the Dutch Darts Masters (1–6 to Maik Kuivenhoven), and the Queensland Darts Masters (3–6 to Gordon Mathers). At the New South Wales Darts Masters, she reached the quarter-finals, losing 0–6 to Gerwyn Price, but at the New Zealand Darts Masters, she lost 5–6 to Kayden Milne in the first round. Sherrock was invited to the World Series of Darts Finals, losing 4–6 to Peter Wright in the first round. She won three titles in the 2022 PDC Women's Series. In July 2022, Sherrock won the inaugural Women's World Matchplay in Blackpool, beating Katie Sheldon and Lorraine Winstanley to reach the final, where she defeated Aileen de Graaf 6–3. The win meant that Sherrock qualified for the 2022 Grand Slam of Darts. At the Grand Slam, Sherrock was eliminated in the group stage after losses to Peter Wright, Nathan Aspinall and Alan Soutar.

Sherrock appeared to have missed out on qualification for the 2023 PDC World Championship after finishing third in the PDC Women's Series. However, the PDC subsequently announced that Sherrock had qualified for the event by virtue of winning the 2022 Women's World Matchplay, a decision which attracted criticism from some observers due to the mid-season rule change. In November that year, Sherrock stated that she no longer felt welcome by other female players on the PDC Women's Series. She described the atmosphere at a recent event in Wigan as hostile, and said that some players did not want her or Lisa Ashton to be successful. She hoped she could qualify for the main PDC Pro Tour so that she could stop playing in those events. At the World Championship, Sherrock was drawn to face Ricky Evans in the first round, but after winning the opening set, she went on to lose 1–3.

In January 2023, Sherrock entered Q-School in pursuit of a Tour Card. With the top-nine ranked players receiving one, she began the final day of competition in tenth position overall, but a 3–6 loss to Robert Collins in the last-64 meant she missed out. On 18 March, during her 5–3 victory over Marco Verhofstad in the Winmau Challenge Tour Event 9, Sherrock became the first woman to hit a nine-dart finish at a PDC event. At the 2023 Women's World Matchplay, she lost 3–4 to Lisa Ashton in the quarter-finals. On 25 August 2023, Sherrock made further history, as she became the first woman to hit a televised nine-dart finish. She achieved the feat against Adam Lipscombe during the Modus Super Series. She won five events on the 2023 PDC Women's Series to qualify for the 2023 Grand Slam of Darts, where she defeated Martijn Kleermaker, but suffered defeats to Michael van Gerwen and Rob Cross to exit at the group stage.

Sherrock played at the 2024 PDC World Championship, but after winning the opening set, she lost to Jermaine Wattimena 1–3. She entered Q-School and qualified from the first phase. In the next stage, an opening-round defeat on the final day to Ashley Coleman ended her chance to secure a Tour Card. Later that month, she won back-to-back titles on the WDF calendar, claiming victories at both the Las Vegas Open and the Las Vegas Classic. At the 2024 Women's World Matchplay, Sherrock overcame Anastasia Dobromyslova in the quarter-finals, before overturning a two-leg deficit against Lisa Ashton to reach the final. There, she was defeated 3–6 by Beau Greaves. She placed third on the 2024 PDC Women's Series Order of Merit, winning events 1, 4, and 23 to secure a place at the 2025 PDC World Championship. Sherrock missed out on qualification for the 2024 Grand Slam of Darts. Needing to win Event 24, she suffered a defeat in the last-32 to finish behind the second-placed player in the Women's Series Order of Merit, Noa-Lynn van Leuven.

=== 2025–present: Back-to-back finalist at Women's World Matchplay ===
At the 2025 PDC World Championship, Sherrock played Ryan Meikle in the first round, with the winner to play Luke Littler. She won the opening set before losing six consecutive legs to trail 1–2. She won the fourth set to take the match into a decider, but lost 2–3. She failed to win a Tour Card at PDC Q School, but reached the final of the 2025 Women's World Matchplay, after facing match darts against her in both her quarter-final match against Gemma Hayter, and her semi-final match against Noa-Lynn van Leuven. She faced Lisa Ashton in the final and let slip 11 match darts to lose 5–6 in a final-leg decider. In the 2025 PDC Women's Series, Sherrock beat Beau Greaves to win Event 2; her victory ended a run of seven straight defeats against her rival. She was also victorious in Event 11, winning her 20th PDC Women's Series title, after whitewashing Lisa Ashton in the final. In June 2025, Sherrock announced that she intended to take a break from darts in 2026 and focus on her health due to kidney problems. She said the condition had lowered her energy levels and was affecting her stamina.

Sherrock suffered a 0–3 first-round exit to Dave Chisnall in the 2026 PDC World Championship. She failed to earn a Tour Card at PDC Q School, losing in the first round on four successive days. In March, she signed for Winmau Darts and became a player ambassador for them. In Event 5 of the 2026 PDC Women's Series, Sherrock averaged 102.12 as she ended Beau Greaves 114-match winning streak en route to the final, where she was beaten by Lisa Ashton. At the Women's World Matchplay, she defeated Ashton 5–1 in the semi-finals, the only leg she dropped prior to the final. Trailing Greaves 3–5, she levelled the match before losing a final-leg decider to finish runner-up in the event for a third time. Sherrock won her first Women's Series event for 16 months in August, after beating Ashton 5–0 in the final of Event 18. Following runs to the semi-finals and quarter-finals of Events 21 and 22 in the series, Sherrock guaranteed herself an overall top-five position in the series rankings, and therefore earned a place at the forthcoming PDC World Championships.

On 30 October 2026, Sherrock participated in Beat Luke Littler, a Netflix event where 'amateur' players competed in consecutive single-legged matches against then-two-time PDC World Champion Luke Littler. Sherrock was eligible to compete as she did not hold a PDC Tour Card, and she beat Littler to claim the £501,000 prize. Her participation in the event received criticism on social media. PDC president Barry Hearn defended her selection, saying: "Do you want just a series of 20 matches where someone can't even throw a dart?[...]we want excellence competing against excellence".

== Personal life ==
Sherrock has a son, born in 2014, and she worked as a hairdresser prior to becoming a darts player. In 2017, Sherrock had treatment for a kidney problem. This caused her face to swell up, for which she received online abuse. She said she had learned how to use the comments to perform better, stating: "If I'm feeling a bit slouchy, I'll look at some of the comments and I'll be like: 'OK, now I need to prove you wrong. The condition made her teetotal and she is required to drink water regularly to keep her kidneys cleansed. Sherrock dated fellow darts player Cameron Menzies from 2021 to 2025.

Sherrock was appointed Member of the Most Excellent Order of the British Empire (MBE) in the 2023 Birthday Honours for services to darts.

== World Championship results ==
=== BDO World Championship ===
- 2014: Quarter-finals (lost to Anastasia Dobromyslova 1–2)
- 2015: Runner-up (lost to Lisa Ashton 1–3)
- 2016: First round (lost to Ann-Louise Peters 1–2)
- 2017: Quarter-finals (lost to Lisa Ashton 0–2)
- 2018: Quarter-finals (lost to Lisa Ashton 0–2)
- 2019: Quarter-finals (lost to Maria O'Brien 0–2)

=== PDC World Championship ===
- 2020: Third round (lost to Chris Dobey 2–4)
- 2022: First round (lost to Steve Beaton 2–3)
- 2023: First round (lost to Ricky Evans 1–3)
- 2024: First round (lost to Jermaine Wattimena 1–3)
- 2025: First round (lost to Ryan Meikle 2–3)
- 2026: First round (lost to Dave Chisnall 0–3)

== Career finals ==
=== WDF / BDO major finals: 5 (2 titles) ===
Legend
World Championship (0–1)
World Masters (0–1)
World Trophy (1–0)
Finder Darts Masters (1–1)

Outcome	No.	Year	Championship	Opponent in the final	Score (Note: (l) = score in legs, (s) = score in sets.)	Ref
Runner-up	1.	2014	World Masters	(Russia) Anastasia Dobromyslova	1–4 (l)	
Runner-up	2.	2015	World Championship	(England) Lisa Ashton	1–3 (s)	
Winner	3.	2015	Finder Darts Masters	(Russia) Anastasia Dobromyslova	2–1 (s)	
Winner	4.	2018	BDO World Trophy	(England) Lorraine Winstanley	6–3 (l)	
Runner-up	5.	2018	Finder Darts Masters	(England) Lisa Ashton	1–2 (s)	

=== PDC World Series finals: 1 (1 runner-up) ===
Legend
World Series of Darts (0–1)

Outcome	No.	Year	Championship	Opponent in the final	Score	Ref
Runner-up	1.	2021	Nordic Darts Masters	Michael van Gerwen	7–11 (l)	

=== PDC Women's televised finals: 4 (1 title) ===
Legend
Women's World Matchplay (1–3)

Outcome	No.	Year	Championship	Opponent in the final	Score	Ref
Winner	1.	2022	Women's World Matchplay	Aileen de Graaf	6–3 (l)	
Runner-up	2.	2024	Women's World Matchplay	Beau Greaves	3–6 (l)	
Runner-up	3.	2025	Women's World Matchplay (2)	Lisa Ashton	5–6 (l)	
Runner-up	4.	2026	Women's World Matchplay (3)	Beau Greaves	5–6 (l)	

== Career statistics ==
Performance Table Legend
W	Won the tournament	F	Finalist	SF	Semifinalist	QF	Quarterfinalist	#R; RR; Prel.	Lost in # round Round-robin; Preliminary round	DQ	Disqualified
DNQ	Did not qualify	DNP	Did not participate	WD	Withdrew	NH	Tournament not held	#R; RR; Prel.	Lost in # round Round-robin; Preliminary round	NYF	Not yet founded

=== Performance timeline ===
==== BDO ====
Tournament	2013	2014	2015	2016	2017	2018	2019
BDO Ranked televised events (Women)
World Championship	DNQ	QF	F	1R	QF	QF	QF
World Trophy	NH	SF	SF	1R	1R	W	1R
World Masters	SF	F	SF	2R	5R	4R	3R
Finder Darts Masters	DNP	RR	W	RR	DNP	F	NH

==== PDC ====
Tournament	2020	2021	2022	2023	2024	2025	2026
PDC Ranked televised events
World Championship	3R	DNQ	1R	1R	1R	1R	1R
UK Open	1R	DNQ					
Grand Slam	DNQ	QF	RR	RR	DNQ		
PDC Non-ranked televised events
Premier League	C	DNP					
World Series Finals	1R	2R	1R	DNP			
PDC Televised women's events
Women's World Matchplay	Not held		W	QF	F	F	F

== Nine-dart finishes ==
Fallon Sherrock nine-dart finishes
Date	Opponent	Tournament	Method	Prize	Ref
18 March 2023 (Note: Non televised event)	(Netherlands) Marco Verhofstad	Challenge Tour 9	3 x T20; 3 x T20; T20, T19, D12	N/A	
25 August 2023 (Note: this was a televised event)	Adam Lipscombe	MODUS Super Series	3 x T20; 3 x T20; T20, T19, D12	N/A	
