= 2020 World Series of Darts Finals =

2020 bwin World Series of Darts Finals

Tournament information
- Dates: 18–20 September 2020
- Venue: Salzburgarena
- Location: Salzburg
- Country: Austria
- Organisation(s): PDC
- Format: Legs
- Prize fund: £300,000
- Winner's share: £70,000
- High checkout: 170 (England) James Wade(x2)

Champion(s)
- (Wales) Gerwyn Price

The 2020 bwin World Series of Darts Finals was the sixth staging of the World Series of Darts Finals tournament, organised by the Professional Darts Corporation. The tournament took place at the Salzburgarena, Salzburg, Austria, from 18 to 20 September 2020, with smaller, masked, socially distanced crowds. It featured a field of 24 players.

Michael van Gerwen was the defending champion, having defeated Danny Noppert 11–2 in the 2019 final. However, he was beaten 6–4 in the second round by Glen Durrant.

Gerwyn Price won the tournament for the first time, his first World Series title, after beating Rob Cross 11–9 in the final.

== Prize money ==
The prize money remained the same as the previous year.

Position (no. of players)		Prize money (Total: £300,000)
Winner	(1)	£70,000
Runner-up	(1)	£30,000
Semi-finalists	(2)	£20,000
Quarter-finalists	(4)	£15,000
Last 16 (second round)	(8)	£7,500
Last 24 (first round)	(8)	£5,000

== Qualification ==
Due to the COVID-19 pandemic, no events were held on the World Series of Darts between the 2019 and 2020 finals. Instead of the standard rules of the top 8 players on the World Series Order of Merit being seeded, the PDC invited the eight top-ranked players in the PDC Order of Merit to make up the seeds. Twelve more players were invited unseeded (consisting of the next 4 players on the Order of Merit, plus players representing the regions of the world where the events were due to take place), with the final four players being determined by a qualifier for Tour Card holders held on 11 September at H+ Hotel, Niedernhausen, Germany.

Kyle Anderson was originally invited, but withdrew for personal reasons. Glen Durrant replaced him. Gary Anderson was originally invited as the eighth seed, but also withdrew, with James Wade moving into the seeded places and Krzysztof Ratajski receiving an invitation.

The following players qualified for the tournament:

Invited Seeds
1. (Netherlands) Michael van Gerwen (second round)
2. (Scotland) Peter Wright (semi-finals)
3. (Wales) Gerwyn Price (champion)
4. (England) Michael Smith (quarter-finals)
5. (England) Rob Cross (runner-up)
6. (England) Nathan Aspinall (quarter-finals)
7. (Northern Ireland) Daryl Gurney (quarter-finals)
8. (England) James Wade (semi-finals)

Order of Merit Players
- (England) Dave Chisnall (first round)
- (England) Ian White (first round)
- (Austria) Mensur Suljović (first round)
- (Belgium) Dimitri Van den Bergh (first round)
- (England) Glen Durrant (quarter-finals)
- (Poland) Krzysztof Ratajski (second round)

International Representatives
- (New Zealand) Cody Harris (second round)
- (Australia) Damon Heta (second round)
- (Lithuania) Darius Labanauskas (second round)
- (England) Fallon Sherrock (first round)
- (Canada) Jeff Smith (second round)
- (Australia) Simon Whitlock (first round)

Tour Card Holder Qualifiers
- (England) Steve Beaton (second round)
- (England) Joe Cullen (first round)
- (England) Harry Ward (first round)
- (Netherlands) Vincent van der Voort (second round)

== Draw ==
First round (best of 11 legs); 18 September
RQ	(England) Glen Durrant 95.82	6
RQ	(Belgium) Dimitri Van den Bergh 85.88	3
(Canada) Jeff Smith 86.57	6
(England) Fallon Sherrock 85.11	5
RQ	(Poland) Krzysztof Ratajski 99.71	6
RQ	(Austria) Mensur Suljović 102.64	3
(Australia) Simon Whitlock 85.38	5
Q	(England) Steve Beaton 89.23	6
RQ	(England) Ian White 89.72	5
(Australia) Damon Heta 89.41	6
(New Zealand) Cody Harris 89.77	6
RQ	(England) Dave Chisnall 78.92	2
Q	(Netherlands) Vincent van der Voort 95.94	6
Q	(England) Joe Cullen 83.73	0
Q	(England) Harry Ward 85.41	2
(Lithuania) Darius Labanauskas 91.09	6

Second round (best of 11 legs); 19 September
1	(Netherlands) Michael van Gerwen 102.00	4
RQ	(England) Glen Durrant 102.50	6
8	(England) James Wade 97.04	6
(Canada) Jeff Smith 88.04	3
4	(England) Michael Smith 95.37	6
RQ	(Poland) Krzysztof Ratajski 95.71	4
5	(England) Rob Cross 90.18	6
Q	(England) Steve Beaton 75.97	0
2	(Scotland) Peter Wright 101.49	6
(Australia) Damon Heta 94.13	3
7	(Northern Ireland) Daryl Gurney 102.36	6
(New Zealand) Cody Harris 88.09	2
3	(Wales) Gerwyn Price 101.46	6
Q	(Netherlands) Vincent van der Voort 88.49	3
6	(England) Nathan Aspinall 101.10	6
(Lithuania) Darius Labanauskas 84.09	1

Quarter-finals (best of 19 legs); 20 September
RQ	(England) Glen Durrant 102.46	9
8	(England) James Wade 99.14	10
4	(England) Michael Smith 98.10	8
5	(England) Rob Cross 98.67	10
2	(Scotland) Peter Wright 100.23	10
7	(Northern Ireland) Daryl Gurney 99.39	5
3	(Wales) Gerwyn Price 100.94	10
6	(England) Nathan Aspinall 103.37	9

Semi-finals (best of 21 legs); 20 September
8	(England) James Wade 87.58	7
5	(England) Rob Cross 85.28	11
2	(Scotland) Peter Wright 108.10	6
3	(Wales) Gerwyn Price 102.48	11

Final (best of 21 legs); 20 September
5	(England) Rob Cross 94.22	9
3	(Wales) Gerwyn Price 96.21	11
