= 2021 Nordic Darts Masters =

2021 Viaplay Nordic Darts Masters

Tournament information
- Dates: 17–18 September 2021
- Venue: Forum Copenhagen
- Location: Copenhagen
- Country: Denmark
- Organisation(s): PDC
- Format: Legs
- Prize fund: £60,000
- Winner's share: £20,000
- High checkout: 161 Jonny Clayton

Champion(s)
- Michael van Gerwen

The 2021 Viaplay Nordic Darts Masters was the inaugural staging of the tournament by the Professional Darts Corporation, and the first entry in the 2021 World Series of Darts. The tournament featured 16 players (eight PDC players and eight regional qualifiers) and was held at the Forum Copenhagen in Copenhagen, Denmark on 17–18 September 2021.

Michael van Gerwen won his 16th World Series event defeating Fallon Sherrock 11–7 in the final. Van Gerwen won his first title overall in 2021, ending a 292 days streak without any tournament win. Sherrock also became the first woman to reach a televised PDC final (with the exception of the one-off 2010 PDC Women's World Darts Championship).

This was the first World Series of Darts event held in Scandinavia, after the 2020 tournament had to be postponed due to the COVID-19 pandemic.

== Prize money ==
The total prize fund was £60,000.

| Position (no. of players) | | Prize money (Total: £60,000) |
|---|---|---|
| Winner | (1) | £20,000 |
| Runner-up | (1) | £10,000 |
| Semi-finalists | (2) | £5,000 |
| Quarter-finalists | (4) | £2,500 |
| First round | (8) | £1,250 |

== Qualifiers ==
The eight invited PDC representatives were announced on 1 September, with the top four ranked players being seeded in the draw.

1. Gerwyn Price (quarter-finals, withdrew)
2. Peter Wright (quarter-finals)
3. Michael van Gerwen (champion)
4. Dimitri Van den Bergh (semi-finals)
5. Gary Anderson (quarter-finals)
6. Nathan Aspinall (first round)
7. Jonny Clayton (semi-finals)
8. Fallon Sherrock (runner-up)

The Nordic qualifiers were chosen by various means. The four PDCNB Tour Card holders who were given their places for the original 2020 tournament kept their places (even though Marko Kantele had since lost his Tour Card), the three highest ranked Danish players after the PDCNB Tour events in Iceland on 19–21 August also qualified, and so did the winner of a PDCNB qualifier on 22 August.

| Qualification | Player |
|---|---|
| PDCNB Tour Card Holders | Darius Labanauskas (first round) |
| PDCNB Tour Card Holders | Madars Razma (quarter-finals) |
| PDCNB Tour Card Holders | Daniel Larsson (first round) |
| PDCNB Tour Card Holders | Marko Kantele (first round) |
| #1 Ranked Danish Player On PDCNB Tour | Andreas Toft Jørgensen (first round) |
| #2 Ranked Danish Player On PDCNB Tour | Niels Heinsøe (first round) |
| #3 Ranked Danish Player On PDCNB Tour | Ivan Springborg Poulsen (first round) |
| PDCNB Qualifier | Johan Engström (first round) |

== Draw ==
First round (best of 11 legs); 17 September
1 | Gerwyn Price 90.44 | 6
Daniel Larsson 85.93 | 3
Fallon Sherrock 87.40 | 6
Niels Heinsøe 75.56 | 1
4 | Dimitri Van den Bergh 90.08 | 6
Johan Engström 87.92 | 4
Gary Anderson 95.40 | 6
Andreas Toft Jørgensen 80.96 | 3
2 | Peter Wright 88.61 | 6
Marko Kantele 83.97 | 1
Jonny Clayton 99.10 | 6
Ivan Springborg Poulsen 81.21 | 0
3 | Michael van Gerwen 97.72 | 6
Darius Labanauskas 87.80 | 5
Nathan Aspinall 96.02 | 4
Madars Razma 95.83 | 6

Quarter-finals (best of 19 legs); 18 September
1 | Gerwyn Price (Note: Price withdrew from the tournament due to an elbow injury, meaning Sherrock automatically advanced to the semi-finals.) | w/d
Fallon Sherrock | w/o
4 | Dimitri Van den Bergh 88.57 | 10
Gary Anderson 88.25 | 8
2 | Peter Wright 97.76 | 3
Jonny Clayton 103.87 | 10
3 | Michael van Gerwen 101.60 | 10
Madars Razma 89.72 | 4

Semi-finals (best of 21 legs); 18 September
Fallon Sherrock 88.39 | 11
4 | Dimitri Van den Bergh 89.88 | 10
Jonny Clayton 103.13 | 7
3 | Michael van Gerwen 102.80 | 11

Final (best of 21 legs); 18 September
Fallon Sherrock 96.20 | 7
3 | Michael van Gerwen 98.54 | 11
