= PDC secondary tours =

Semi-professional darts tournaments

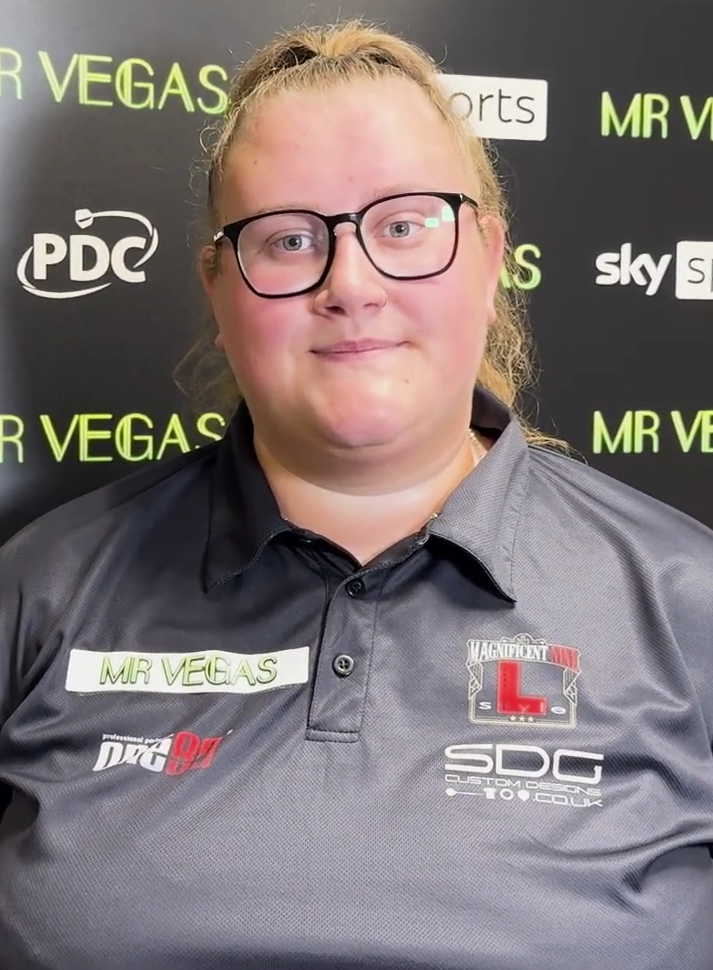
Beau Greaves, the most successful player on the Women's Series. She is the only darts player to have both won events on, and simultaneously led, all three PDC secondary tours.

The PDC secondary tours are semi-professional darts tours organised by the Professional Darts Corporation (PDC) open to players without a PDC Tour Card. The three secondary tours operated by the PDC are the Challenge Tour, Development Tour and Women's Series. Each tour consists of a year-long series of knockout tournaments which each carry their own prize money. Like the PDC Pro Tour, each of the Secondary Tours maintains its own Order of Merit which ranks players according to their total prize money won in each calendar year. Players at the top of their respective Orders of Merit are able to qualify for certain televised PDC major events such as the World Championship. In the case of the Challenge and Development Tours, the top two eligible players win PDC Tour Cards for the following season, while players on all three tours can win free entry to the following season's Q-School (the qualifying tournament for a Tour Card) by achieving a high rank.

In addition to the three secondary tours, the PDC also sanctions several Affiliate Tours, which are largely operated in regions outside of the British Isles by local organisations. The Affiliate Tours have a similar structure to the secondary tours and some offer qualification to televised tournaments. However, these qualification opportunities are fewer than those offered to the secondary tours and none offer Tour Cards.

Several PDC major winners have participated in the secondary tours, including World Champions Michael van Gerwen, Rob Cross and Luke Humphries who won secondary tours prior to their World Championship successes. Many winners of televised women's darts tournaments have won Women's Series events, including multiple-time BDO Women's World Darts Championship winners Trina Gulliver, Lisa Ashton and Mikuru Suzuki and the reigning and three-time WDF Women's World Darts Champion, Beau Greaves. In February 2025, Beau Greaves became the only player to have led all three secondary tours at the same time.

== Challenge Tour ==
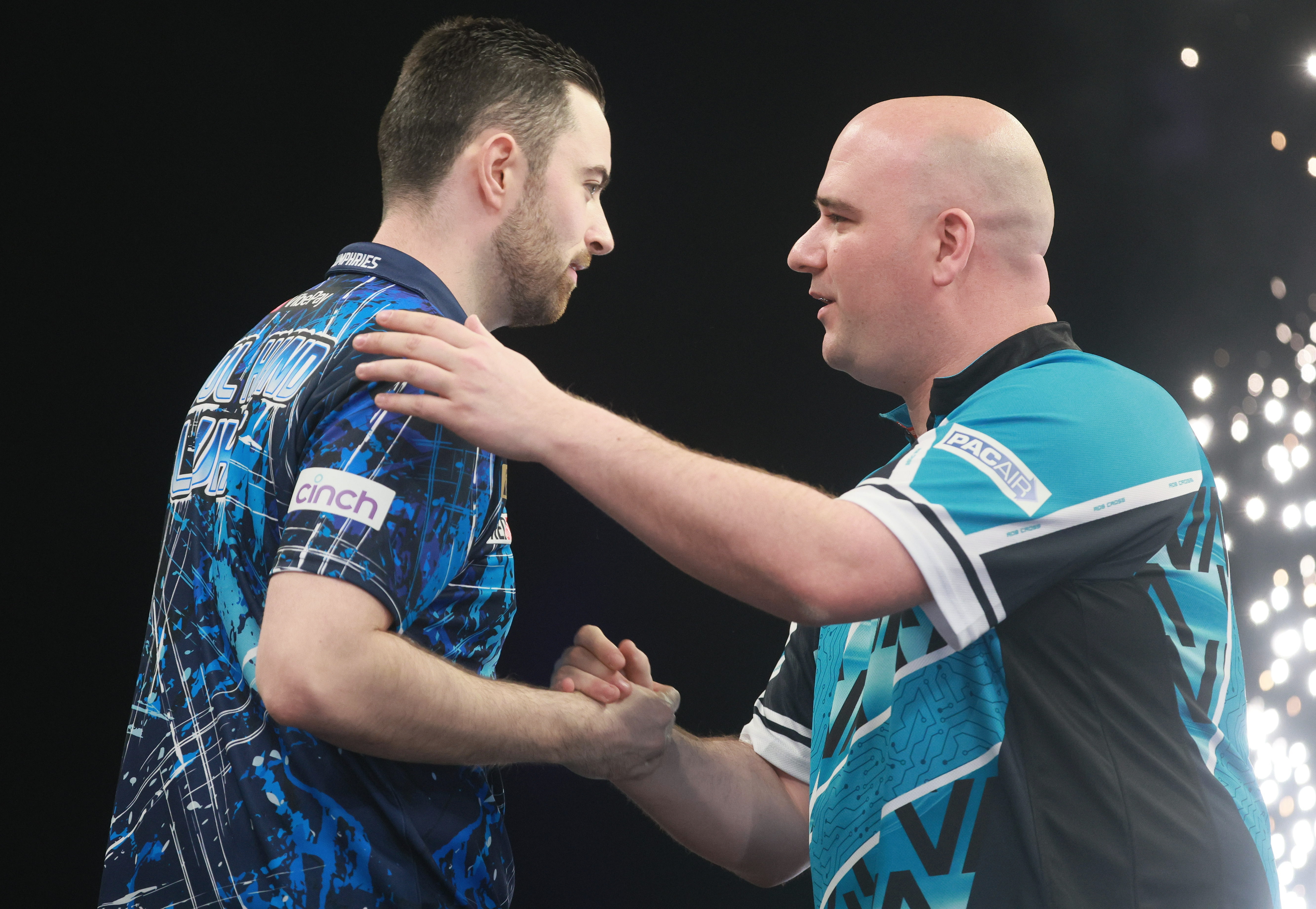
Luke Humphries (left) and Rob Cross, the two PDC World Champions who have won Challenge Tour events.

The PDC Challenge Tour (currently known for sponsorship reasons as the PDC Winmau Challenge Tour) is open to all players who attended that season's Q-School but failed to win a Tour Card. The Challenge Tour maintains an Order of Merit which tracks the prize money won across all tournaments in a calendar year, with the Challenge Tour winner being the player that wins the most money. Both the Challenge Tour winner and runner-up receive Tour Cards for the following season, while players ranked 3–16 qualify automatically to the final stage of Q-School and are exempt from paying an entry fee.

Four PDC majors offer places to Challenge Tour players. The Challenge Tour winner receives an invitation to the Grand Slam of Darts, while the top three players receive invitations to the World Championship. Additionally, the UK Open and the preliminary stage of the World Masters offers places to the top eight players from the previous season's Challenge Tour who do not have a Tour Card by the time the competition is held.

Currently, the tour consists of 24 events, rising from 16 events in 2014, the year the Tour was founded. The first winner of a Challenge Tour tournament was Jamie Robinson, who beat Matthew Edgar 5–4 in the final of the first event. In 2016, Rob Cross became the first future PDC World Champion to win a Challenge Tour event, though former BDO World Champion and PDC World Matchplay runner-up Richie Burnett won an event in 2015. Luke Humphries, Nathan Aspinall and Ritchie Edhouse have all won Challenge Tour events before winning PDC titles. Additionally, BDO World Champions Scott Mitchell and Scott Waites, PDC World Championship runners-up Kirk Shepherd and Andy Hamilton and PDC World Cup winner John Henderson all won Challenge Tour titles in the later years of their careers while no longer holding PDC Tour Cards. In 2024, Noa-Lynn van Leuven became the first woman to win a Challenge Tour event, while Beau Greaves became the first woman to win multiple Challenge Tour events in 2025. To the end of the 2024 season, 34 nine-dart finishes had been hit on the Challenge Tour, with Matt Dicken the first to achieve the feat in the tour's inaugural season. Fallon Sherrock's nine-darter in Event 9 of the 2023 season made her the first woman to achieve the feat in a PDC competition.

== Development Tour ==
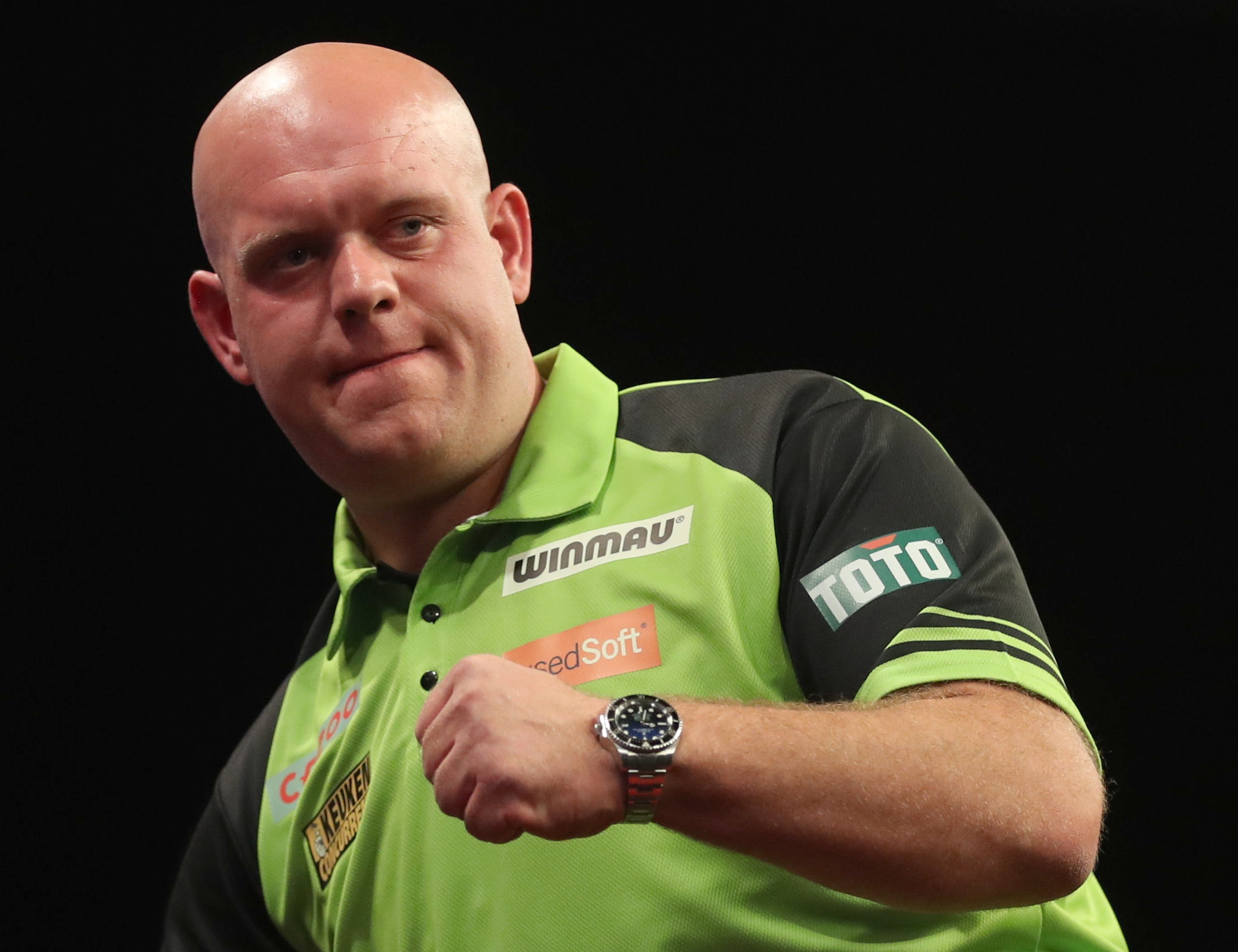
In 2011, Michael van Gerwen was the first winner of the PDC Development Tour (then the PDC Youth Tour).

The PDC Development Tour (currently known for sponsorship reasons as the PDC Winmau Development Tour) is open to all players over the age of 16 who were aged under 24 the day after the previous season's World Championship. In contrast to the Challenge Tour, Tour Card holders are eligible to play in Development Tour events if they are ranked outside the top 64 in the PDC Order of Merit. Additionally, there is no requirement for players to have played in the previous season's Q-School.

Like the Challenge Tour, the top two Development Tour players at the end of the season receive Tour Cards for the following season, while players ranked 3–16 receive free entry to the final stage of Q-School. The Development Tour offers the same qualification routes to television tournaments as the Challenge Tour, with the top-ranked player qualifying for the Grand Slam, the three best players qualifying for the World Championship and the eight best players that do not gain new Tour Cards over the winter qualifying for the next season's UK Open and the preliminary stage of the World Masters. Additionally, once invitational and eligible Tour Card holder places have been filled, the Development Tour Order of Merit is used to fill the remaining spaces at the PDC World Youth Championship.

The tour was founded in 2011 as the PDC Youth Tour and was briefly named the PDC Challenge Tour in the 2013 season, before becoming the Development Tour in 2015. The first winner of a Development (then Youth) Tour event was Adam Hunt, who beat Josh Jones 4–2 in the final of the first event in 2011. Michael van Gerwen won four titles and the Order of Merit in the inaugural season, and later went on to become one of the most successful players of all time. In 2012, Michael Smith became the next Youth Tour event winner who would go on to become a PDC World Champion, followed by Luke Humphries in 2017 and Luke Littler in 2023. Other PDC major winners that won events on the Development Tour before winning senior major titles are Joe Cullen, Dimitri Van den Bergh, Mike De Decker and Josh Rock. To the end of the 2024 season, 24 nine-dart finishes had been hit on the Development Tour, with the first being hit by Michael Smith in the second event of the tour's first edition.

== Women's Series ==
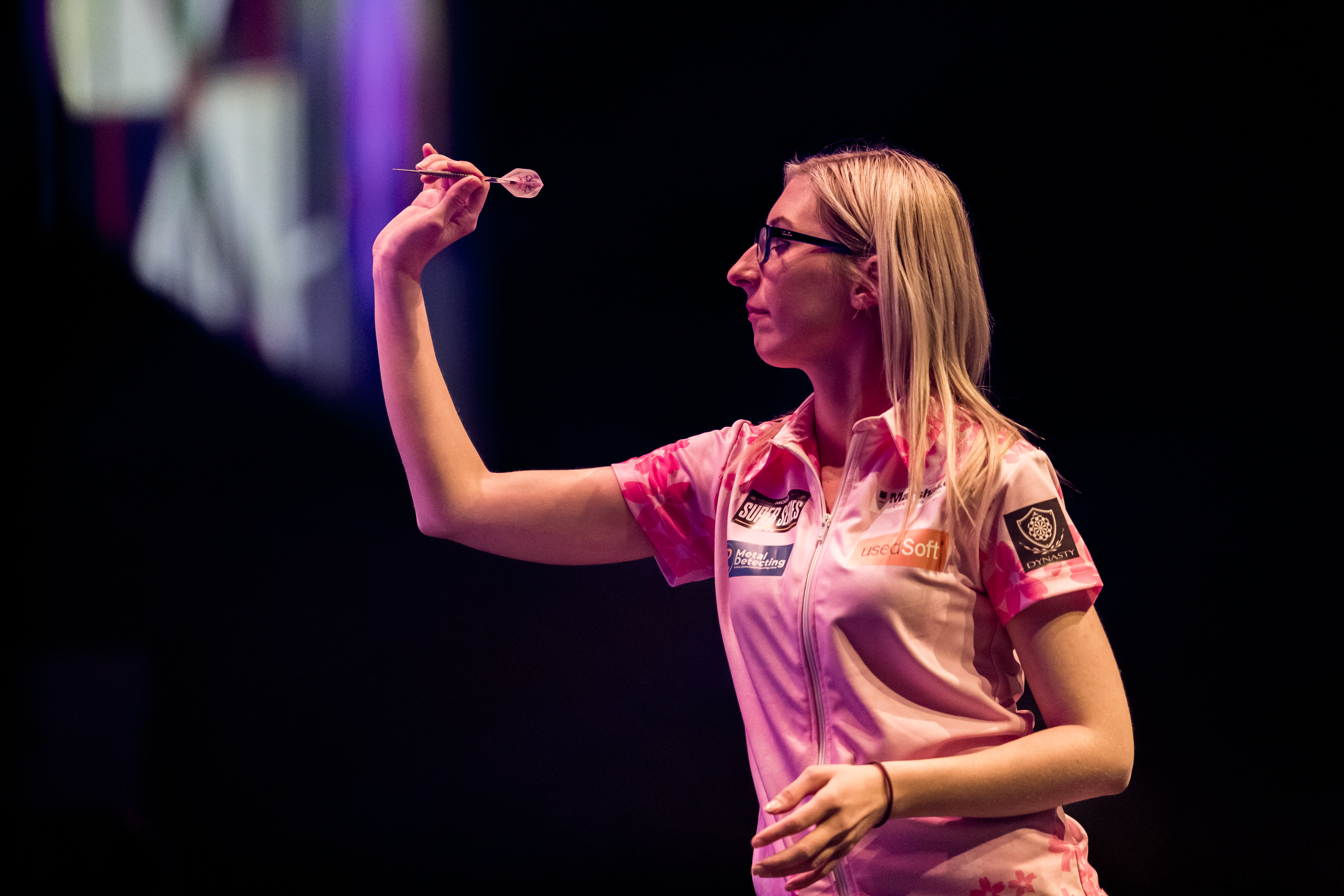
Fallon Sherrock has won events in every edition of the Women's Series.

The PDC Women's Series is open to all female players over the age of 16. Like the Development Tour, female Tour Card holders are eligible to play so long as they are outside the top 64 of the PDC Order of Merit. Unlike the Challenge Tour and Development Tour, no Tour Cards are awarded to the best performers of the Women's Series, though the top eight players are invited to the first stage of Q-School and are exempt from the entry fee.

Like the other secondary tours, the winner of the Women's Series qualifies for the Grand Slam of Darts. Eight players qualify for the Women's World Matchplay, the PDC's only all-female televised tournament, through a separate Order of Merit tracking money won on the Women's Series in an approximately 12-month period prior to the event, which traditionally occurs in July. The three players at the top of Women's Series Order of Merit (excluding the Women's World Matchplay Champion) qualify to the World Championship, guaranteeing that at least four places in the tournament are occupied by women. Additionally, the top 8 players without Tour Cards qualify to the preliminary stages of the next season's World Masters.

The Women's Series was founded in 2020 as a mini-tour of four events to determine the two female qualifiers for the World Championship, replacing the previous women's qualifier. This occurred at the same time as the demise of the British Darts Organisation, which previously organised the majority of women's darts events. The Women's Series became a full Tour in 2021, expanding to 12 events in two locations (though three were originally planned). It further expanded to 20 events in 2022 and its current 24 events in 2023.

Initially, Lisa Ashton and Fallon Sherrock dominated the Women's Series, winning all but two of the 2020 and 2021 events between them, with Deta Hedman and Mikuru Suzuki winning the other two events. However, after starting to participate midway through the 2022 season, Beau Greaves has dominated the Women's Series. Despite missing the first 12 events in 2022, Greaves won all eight remaining events to qualify for the 2023 World Championship. In 2023, Greaves won half the events, a feat which she bettered in 2025 by winning 18 events, including an 86-match winning streak across the last 13 events of the season. In 2024, Noa-Lynn van Leuven challenged the Greaves-Ashton-Sherrock triumvirate, becoming the first transgender player to win Women's Series events, collecting four titles and qualifying for the World Championship. Other than Greaves, Sherrock, Ashton and van Leuven, Mikuru Suzuki, Gemma Hayter and Robyn Byrne are the only players to win multiple Women's Series titles.

== Secondary tour winners ==
Year	Challenge Tour		Development Tour		Women's Series	
2011	—N/a		(Netherlands) Michael van Gerwen	Results	—N/a	
2012	—N/a		(England) Arron Monk	Results	—N/a	
2013	—N/a		(England) Ross Smith	Results	—N/a	
2014	(England) Mark Frost	Results	(Belgium) Dimitri van den Bergh	Results	—N/a	
2015	(Netherlands) Jan Dekker	Results	(England) Bradley Kirk	Results	—N/a	
2016	(England) Rob Cross	Results	(Wales) Dean Reynolds	Results	—N/a	
2017	(England) Wayne Jones	Results	(England) Luke Humphries	Results	—N/a	
2018	(England) Michael Barnard	Results	(England) Luke Humphries	Results	—N/a	
2019	(England) Callan Rydz	Results	(England) Ted Evetts	Results	—N/a	
2020	(England) David Evans	Results	(England) Ryan Meikle	Results	(England) Lisa Ashton	Results
2021 (Note: In 2021, COVID-19 restrictions meant the PDC split the Challenge Tour and Development Tour into UK and European tours, each with 12 events rather than the planned 24 for the regular tour.)	(Wales) Jim Williams (UK)	Results	(England) Bradley Brooks (UK)	Results	(England) Fallon Sherrock	Results
2021	(Canada) Matt Campbell (EU)	Results	(Austria) Rusty-Jake Rodriguez (EU)	Results	(England) Fallon Sherrock	Results
2022	(England) Scott Williams	Results	(Northern Ireland) Nathan Rafferty	Results	(England) Lisa Ashton	Results
2023	(Netherlands) Berry van Peer	Results	(Netherlands) Gian van Veen	Results	(England) Beau Greaves	Results
2024	(England) Connor Scutt	Results	(Netherlands) Wessel Nijman	Results	(England) Beau Greaves	Results
2025	(Switzerland) Stefan Bellmont	Results	(England) Cam Crabtree	Results	(England) Beau Greaves	Results

== Prize money ==
Prize money for the PDC secondary tours as of 2026
Stage reached	Challenge/Development Tour	Women's Series
Winner	£3,000	£2,500
Runner-up	£2,000	£1,000
Semi-finalists	£1,000	£750
Quarter-finalists	£750	£500
Last 16	£350	£300
Last 32	£250	£200
Last 64 (Note: Prize money for reaching the last 64 on the Women's Series is awarded only when there at least 128 participants.)	£100	£75
Total	£20,000	£15,000

== Affiliate Tours ==
The Affiliate Tours are mostly regional tours sanctioned, but not directly run by, the PDC. With the exception of the Junior Darts Corporation, an organisation offering multiple tours for players under the age of 18, most share the format of the secondary tours, where multiple knockout tournaments are held through the year and prize money won contributes to a single Order of Merit. The Next-Gen Europe tour (which serves German-speaking Europe) differs slightly, offering prize money both for the stage reached in a tournament and performance-based bonus money for high scores, high checkouts and short legs. Additionally, both the Next-Gen Europe and Championship Darts Corporation (for American and Canadian players) use modified tournament formats on their tours. These include set-play rather than legs, double-in double-out and the addition of a group stage. Alongside their tours, some PDC affiliates also organise standalone affiliate events, which are often televised in their region.

PDC Affiliate Tours
Affiliate Tour	Region covered	Associated Affiliate Event	Qualifiers from Affiliate Tour	
Affiliate Tour	Region covered	Associated Affiliate Event	World Championship	Other tournaments
PDC Asian Tour	Asia	Asian Championship	Top 5 players and Asian Championship finalists	Asian Championship winner qualifies for the Grand Slam of Darts. Top 16 players and highest-ranked players from some nations qualify for the Asian Championship.
PDC Nordic and Baltic	The Nordic countries and the Baltic states	Nordic and Baltic Championship	Top 2 players and Nordic and Baltic Championship winner	Top 8 players get free entry to the first stage of Q-School. Top 24 players qualify for Nordic and Baltic Championship.
PDC Europe Next-Gen	Germany, Austria, Switzerland, Luxembourg and Liechtenstein	PDC Europe Super League	PDC Europe Super League Winner	Top 20 players and top 4 youth players qualify for the PDC Europe Super League.
Dartplayers Australia	Australia	ANZ Premier League	Top player and ANZ Premier League winner	Top 3 players qualify for ANZ Premier League.
Australian Darts Association	Oceania	ANZ Premier League	Top player and ANZ Premier League winner	Top 2 players qualify for ANZ Premier League
Dartplayers New Zealand	New Zealand	ANZ Premier League	Top player and ANZ Premier League winner	Top player and 1 other top-16 player to ANZ Premier League
Championship Darts Corporation	Canada and the United States	North American Championship, Continental Cup and Cross-Border Challenge	Major winners and top-ranked American and Canadian	North American Championship winner qualifies for Grand Slam of Darts. Qualification for majors based on CDC Order of Merit and nationality.
PDC China	China	China Premier League and China Championship	China Championship winner	Top 8 players qualify for the China Championship. Top 6 players qualify for the China Premier League.
Championship Darts Latin and Caribbean America	The Americas, excluding the United States and Canada	—N/a	Qualifying tournament winner	—N/a
African Continental Tour	Africa	—N/a	Qualifying tournament winner	—N/a
Junior Darts Corporation	Open to players worldwide aged 10-18, but based in the United Kingdom	Many competitions, including a World Championship.	—N/a	Four players selected for the World Masters.
