= 2024 PDC Women's Series =

Series of darts tournaments

The 2024 PDC Women's Series consisted of 24 darts tournaments on the 2024 PDC Pro Tour.

Beau Greaves topped the Women's Series Order of Merit final ranking, and qualified for the 2024 Grand Slam of Darts, alongside second-placed Noa-Lynn van Leuven. Alongside van Leuven, Fallon Sherrock qualified for the 2025 PDC World Darts Championship via this Tour.

== March ==
=== Women's Series 1 ===
Women's Series 1 was contested on Saturday 23 March 2024 at the Robin Park Tennis Court in Wigan.

The event was won by Fallon Sherrock, who defeated Beau Greaves 5–4 in the final.

Quarter-finals (best of 9 legs)
Kim Holden 68.83	1
Fallon Sherrock 84.37	5
Mikuru Suzuki 73.78	3
Katie Sheldon 73.05	5
Beau Greaves 88.42	5
Noa-Lynn van Leuven 84.31	2
Wendy Reinstadtler 65.06	2
Gemma Hayter 73.46	5

Semi-finals (best of 9 legs)
Fallon Sherrock 83.47	5
Katie Sheldon 76.69	2
Beau Greaves 84.95	5
Gemma Hayter 77.21	4

Final (best of 9 legs)
Fallon Sherrock 89.35	5
Beau Greaves 85.63	4

=== Women's Series 2 ===
Women's Series 2 was contested on Saturday 23 March 2024 at the Robin Park Arena in Wigan.

The event was won by Noa-Lynn van Leuven, who defeated Katie Sheldon 5–2 in the final.

Quarter-finals (best of 9 legs)
Lorraine Winstanley 68.07	0
Fallon Sherrock 88.41	5
Noa-Lynn van Leuven 91.84	5
Beau Greaves 81.95	3
Anastasia Dobromyslova (Note: Anastasia Dobromyslova has competed under a neutral designation since the 2022 Russian invasion of Ukraine.) 68.02	0
Katie Sheldon 84.44	5
Mikuru Suzuki 75.61	5
Angela Kirkwood 67.54	1

Semi-finals (best of 9 legs)
Fallon Sherrock 88.19	3
Noa-Lynn van Leuven 100.99	5
Katie Sheldon 78.68	5
Mikuru Suzuki 79.89	4

Final (best of 9 legs)
Noa-Lynn van Leuven 87.23	5
Katie Sheldon 79.55	2

=== Women's Series 3 ===
Women's Series 3 was contested on Sunday 24 March 2024 at the Robin Park Arena in Wigan.

The event was won by Mikuru Suzuki, who defeated Deta Hedman 5–4 in the final.

Quarter-finals (best of 9 legs)
Mikuru Suzuki	5
Yukie Sakaguchi	2
Fallon Sherrock 85.76	5
Rhian O'Sullivan 83.09	2
Kirsi Viinikainen 79.79	3
Deta Hedman 84.51	5
Noa-Lynn van Leuven 70.86	4
Lorraine Hyde 70.86	5

Semi-finals (best of 9 legs)
Mikuru Suzuki 80.91	5
Fallon Sherrock 78.74	4
Deta Hedman 78.90	5
Lorraine Hyde 72.63	4

Final (best of 9 legs)
Mikuru Suzuki 80.71	5
Deta Hedman 80.55	4

=== Women's Series 4 ===
Women's Series 4 was contested on Sunday 24 March 2024 at the Robin Park Arena in Wigan.

The event was won by Fallon Sherrock, who defeated Beau Greaves 5–1 in the final, to win her second title of the weekend.

Quarter-finals (best of 9 legs)
Desiree Geel 68.38	5
Maria O'Brien 65.11	3
Fallon Sherrock 92.78	5
Kirsi Viinikainen 78.28	0
Mikuru Suzuki 82.64	5
Kim Holden 72.25	2
Deta Hedman 82.13	1
Beau Greaves 88.47	5

Semi-finals (best of 9 legs)
Desiree Geel 77.44	1
Fallon Sherrock 97.47	5
Mikuru Suzuki 77.86	4
Beau Greaves 82.07	5

Final (best of 9 legs)
Fallon Sherrock 87.82	5
Beau Greaves 76.68	1

== April ==
=== Women's Series 5 ===
Women's Series 5 was contested on Saturday 20 April 2024 at the Robin Park Tennis Court in Wigan.

The event was won by Noa-Lynn van Leuven, who defeated Beau Greaves 5–4 in the final.

Quarter-finals (best of 9 legs)
Leanne Topper 71.96	3
Noa-Lynn van Leuven 85.13	5
Lorraine Winstanley 80.68	2
Rhian O'Sullivan 80.18	5
Beau Greaves 87.38	5
Maria O'Brien 65.44	0
Lisa Ashton 96.06	5
Fallon Sherrock 84.24	2

Semi-finals (best of 9 legs)
Noa-Lynn van Leuven 90.99	5
Rhian O'Sullivan 80.06	1
Beau Greaves 86.86	5
Lisa Ashton 79.49	3

Final (best of 9 legs)
Noa-Lynn van Leuven 90.65	5
Beau Greaves 91.36	4

=== Women's Series 6 ===
Women's Series 6 was contested on Saturday 20 April 2024 at the Robin Park Tennis Court in Wigan.

The event was won by Beau Greaves, who defeated Lisa Ashton 5–1 in the final.

Quarter-finals (best of 9 legs)
Gemma Hayter 97.37	5
Fallon Sherrock 84.20	1
Lisa Ashton 78.73	5
Aileen de Graaf 75.93	3
Robyn Byrne 71.02	4
Noa-Lynn van Leuven 75.40	5
Beau Greaves 83.45	5
Mikuru Suzuki 78.40	3

Semi-finals (best of 9 legs)
Gemma Hayter 88.13	2
Lisa Ashton 88.80	5
Noa-Lynn van Leuven 81.68	0
Beau Greaves 92.78	5

Final (best of 9 legs)
Lisa Ashton 73.44	1
Beau Greaves 86.62	5

=== Women's Series 7 ===
Women's Series 7 was contested on Saturday 21 April 2024 at the Robin Park Tennis Court in Wigan.

The event was won by Beau Greaves, who defeated Fallon Sherrock 5–0 in the final. Greaves won all 31 legs she played at the event.

Quarter-finals (best of 9 legs)
Rhian O'Sullivan 70.53	2
Robyn Byrne 74.96	5
Beau Greaves 95.13	5
Wendy Reinstadtler 73.96	0
Mikuru Suzuki 76.18	5
Rose Mort 76.69	4
Lorraine Winstanley 73.15	3
Fallon Sherrock 85.82	5

Semi-finals (best of 9 legs)
Robyn Byrne 74.07	0
Beau Greaves 81.68	5
Mikuru Suzuki 76.89	2
Fallon Sherrock 88.13	5

Final (best of 9 legs)
Beau Greaves 98.88	5
Fallon Sherrock 86.75	0

=== Women's Series 8 ===
Women's Series 8 was contested on Saturday 21 April 2024 at the Robin Park Tennis Court in Wigan.

The event was won by Mikuru Suzuki, who defeated Beau Greaves 5–1 in the final.

Quarter-finals (best of 9 legs)
Noa-Lynn van Leuven 89.31	5
Fallon Sherrock 83.09	3
Gemma Hayter 81.13	2
Beau Greaves 87.55	5
Mikuru Suzuki 79.56	5
Deta Hedman 79.32	4
Lisa Ashton 75.52	5
Robyn Byrne 74.12	2

Semi-finals (best of 9 legs)
Noa-Lynn van Leuven 82.50	2
Beau Greaves 91.13	5
Mikuru Suzuki 79.99	5
Lisa Ashton 77.09	1

Final (best of 9 legs)
Beau Greaves 75.65	1
Mikuru Suzuki 74.33	5

== June ==
=== Women's Series 9 ===
Women's Series 9 was contested on Saturday 15 June 2024 at the Robin Park Tennis Court in Wigan.

The event was won by Beau Greaves, who defeated Mikuru Suzuki 5–4 in the final.

Quarter-finals (best of 9 legs)
Eleanor Cairns 74.87	3
Paige Pauling 70.30	5
Beau Greaves 85.72	5
Kirsi Viinikainen 76.73	1
Aileen de Graaf 68.11	2
Steph Clarke 70.92	5
Mikuru Suzuki 75.15	5
Trina Gulliver 66.30	0

Semi-finals (best of 9 legs)
Paige Pauling 73.87	4
Beau Greaves 82.76	5
Mikuru Suzuki 85.40	5
Steph Clarke 76.36	0

Final (best of 9 legs)
Beau Greaves 91.17	5
Mikuru Suzuki 87.33	4

=== Women's Series 10 ===
Women's Series 10 was contested on Saturday 15 June 2024 at the Robin Park Tennis Court in Wigan.

The event was won by Gemma Hayter, who beat Rhian O'Sullivan, 5–3 in the final.

Quarter-finals (best of 9 legs)
Kim Holden 70.82	4
Paige Pauling 73.55	5
Gemma Hayter 79.27	5
Anastasia Dobromyslova (Note: Anastasia Dobromyslova has competed under a neutral designation since the 2022 Russian invasion of Ukraine.) 68.04	1
Fallon Sherrock 72.96	5
Kirsty Hutchinson 60.44	0
Beau Greaves 79.44	4
Rhian O'Sullivan 77.52	5

Semi-finals (best of 9 legs)
Paige Pauling 65.11	2
Gemma Hayter 75.63	5
Fallon Sherrock 79.01	2
Rhian O'Sullivan 78.74	5

Final (best of 9 legs)
Gemma Hayter 72.00	5
Rhian O'Sullivan 66.21	3

=== Women's Series 11 ===
Women's Series 11 was contested on Sunday 16 June 2024 at the Robin Park Tennis Court in Wigan.

The event was won by Lisa Ashton, who beat Aileen de Graaf, 5–1 in the final.

Quarter-finals (best of 9 legs)
Vicky Pruim 74.63	5
Neuza Araujo 75.83	4
Aileen de Graaf 72.96	5
Noa-Lynn van Leuven 71.96	2
Kirsty Hutchinson 68.21	1
Rhian O'Sullivan 85.56	5
Beau Greaves 90.41	3
Lisa Ashton 85.57	5

Semi-finals (best of 9 legs)
Vicky Pruim 70.55	2
Aileen de Graaf 68.06	5
Rhian O'Sullivan 76.45	4
Lisa Ashton 78.87	5

Final (best of 9 legs)
Aileen de Graaf 71.03	1
Lisa Ashton 83.16	5

=== Women's Series 12 ===
Women's Series 12 was contested on Sunday 16 June 2024 at the Robin Park Tennis Court in Wigan.

The event was won by Lisa Ashton, who beat Beau Greaves, 5–1 in the final.

Quarter-finals (best of 9 legs)
Angela Kirkwood 80.33	5
Steph Clarke 73.00	2
Lorraine Winstanley 80.56	4
Beau Greaves 81.50	5
Lisa Ashton 74.41	5
Laura Turner 66.78	0
Fallon Sherrock 74.41	5
Aoife McCormack 68.16	0

Semi-finals (best of 9 legs)
Angela Kirkwood 76.83	1
Beau Greaves 94.66	5
Lisa Ashton 76.15	5
Fallon Sherrock 75.51	2

Final (best of 9 legs)
Beau Greaves 90.13	1
Lisa Ashton 89.39	5

== August ==
=== Women's Series 13 ===
Women's Series 13 was contested on Saturday 10 August 2024 in Niedernhausen, Germany.

The event was won by Beau Greaves, who defeated Noa-Lynn van Leuven 5–1 in the final.

Quarter-finals (best of 9 legs)
Daniela Schug 58.91	2
Beau Greaves 71.47	5
Natalie Gilbert 69.56	5
Rhian O'Sullivan 72.78	4
Noa-Lynn van Leuven 80.74	5
Robyn Byrne 80.48	4
Laura Turner 71.56	2
Aileen de Graaf 81.73	5

Semi-finals (best of 9 legs)
Beau Greaves 83.87	5
Natalie Gilbert 68.82	1
Noa-Lynn van Leuven 85.78	5
Aileen de Graaf 79.80	4

Final (best of 9 legs)
Beau Greaves 95.74	5
Noa-Lynn van Leuven 77.70	1

=== Women's Series 14 ===
Women's Series 14 was contested on Saturday 10 August 2024 in Niedernhausen, Germany.

The event was won by Aileen de Graaf, who defeated Anca Zijlstra 5–2 in the final.

Quarter-finals (best of 9 legs)
Lorraine Hyde 66.26	1
Anca Zijlstra 69.54	5
Lorraine Winstanley 76.33	5
Aletta Wajer 72.51	1
Neuza Araujo 70.54	1
Lisa Ashton 72.93	5
Aileen de Graaf 74.45	5
Noa-Lynn van Leuven 70.57	2

Semi-finals (best of 9 legs)
Anca Zijlstra 71.19	5
Lorraine Winstanley 70.74	4
Lisa Ashton 79.06	2
Aileen de Graaf 75.66	5

Final (best of 9 legs)
Anca Zijlstra 64.31	2
Aileen de Graaf 67.93	5

=== Women's Series 15 ===
Women's Series 15 was contested on Sunday 11 August 2024 in Niedernhausen, Germany.

The event was won by Noa-Lynn van Leuven, who defeated Beau Greaves 5–4 in the final.

Quarter-finals (best of 9 legs)
Paige Pauling 79.07	1
Mikuru Suzuki 83.06	5
Beau Greaves 84.76	5
Lisa Ashton 80.17	2
Lorraine Hyde 64.23	2
Rhian O'Sullivan 64.69	5
Noa-Lynn van Leuven 78.72	5
Robyn Byrne 78.23	3

Semi-finals (best of 9 legs)
Mikuru Suzuki 77.91	1
Beau Greaves 87.89	5
Rhian O'Sullivan 72.03	1
Noa-Lynn van Leuven 75.85	5

Final (best of 9 legs)
Beau Greaves 92.93	4
Noa-Lynn van Leuven 90.31	5

=== Women's Series 16 ===
Women's Series 16 was contested on Sunday 11 August 2024 in Niedernhausen, Germany.

The event was won by Beau Greaves, who defeated Noa-Lynn van Leuven 5–1 in the final.

Quarter-finals (best of 9 legs)
Fallon Sherrock 70.02	1
Kim Holden 68.33	5
Beau Greaves 92.02	5
Paige Pauling 79.59	2
Lorraine Winstanley 77.33	5
Lisa Ashton 79.15	4
Noa-Lynn van Leuven 79.08	5
Gemma Hayter 75.36	4

Semi-finals (best of 9 legs)
Kim Holden 71.01	3
Beau Greaves 78.10	5
Lorraine Winstanley 83.35	4
Noa-Lynn van Leuven 84.81	5

Final (best of 9 legs)
Beau Greaves 90.00	5
Noa-Lynn van Leuven 94.46	3

== September ==
=== Women's Series 17 ===
Women's Series 17 was contested on Saturday 7 September 2024, at the Robin Park Tennis Court in Wigan.

The event was won by Beau Greaves, who defeated Fallon Sherrock 5–2 in the final.

Quarter-finals (best of 9 legs)
Lorraine Hyde 83.30	2
Fallon Sherrock 90.68	5
Noa-Lynn van Leuven 78.81	5
Lorraine Winstanley 73.58	4
Aileen de Graaf 80.28	5
Robyn Byrne 80.51	4
Kirsi Viinikainen 80.43	4
Beau Greaves 78.47	5

Semi-finals (best of 9 legs)
Fallon Sherrock 81.75	5
Noa-Lynn van Leuven 82.08	4
Aileen de Graaf 75.48	1
Beau Greaves 91.53	5

Final (best of 9 legs)
Fallon Sherrock 81.10	2
Beau Greaves 80.95	5

=== Women's Series 18 ===
Women's Series 18 was contested on Saturday 7 September 2024 at the Robin Park Tennis Court in Wigan.

The event was won by Beau Greaves, who defeated Noa-Lynn van Leuven 5–4 in the final.

Quarter-finals (best of 9 legs)
Denise Cassidy 81.68	5
Vicky Pruim 77.80	3
Beau Greaves 92.78	5
Rhian O'Sullivan 63.37	0
Aileen de Graaf 74.19	5
Kirsi Viinikainen 72.67	4
Noa-Lynn van Leuven 89.46	5
Fallon Sherrock 75.41	0

Semi-finals (best of 9 legs)
Denise Cassidy 73.17	2
Beau Greaves 86.23	5
Aileen de Graaf 68.82	2
Noa-Lynn van Leuven 77.79	5

Final (best of 9 legs)
Beau Greaves 78.94	5
Noa-Lynn van Leuven 77.47	4

=== Women's Series 19 ===
Women's Series 19 was contested on Sunday 8 September 2024 at the Robin Park Tennis Court in Wigan.

The event was won by Gemma Hayter, who defeated Mikuru Suzuki 5–1 in the final.

Quarter-finals (best of 9 legs)
Robyn Byrne 74.41	5
Denise Cassidy 70.06	0
Mikuru Suzuki 80.96	5
Angela Kirkwood 84.41	4
Lisa Ashton 83.10	5
Steph Clarke 70.05	3
Sharona Veld 66.48	0
Gemma Hayter 88.41	5

Semi-finals (best of 9 legs)
Robyn Byrne 68.36	3
Mikuru Suzuki 70.21	5
Lisa Ashton 72.00	0
Gemma Hayter 87.38	5

Final (best of 9 legs)
Mikuru Suzuki 75.08	1
Gemma Hayter 79.88	5

=== Women's Series 20 ===
Women's Series 20 was contested on Sunday 8 September 2024 at the Robin Park Tennis Court in Wigan.

The event was won by Robyn Byrne, who defeated Lorraine Winstanley 5–2 in the final.

Quarter-finals (best of 9 legs)
Aileen de Graaf 80.48	4
Noa-Lynn van Leuven 86.56	5
Lorraine Winstanley 84.75	5
Rhian O'Sullivan 76.98	3
Trina Gulliver 79.58	3
Fallon Sherrock 87.31	5
Robyn Byrne 74.43	5
Lisa Ashton 70.30	1

Semi-finals (best of 9 legs)
Noa-Lynn van Leuven 68.83	2
Lorraine Winstanley 75.13	5
Fallon Sherrock 68.38	2
Robyn Byrne 74.83	5

Final (best of 9 legs)
Lorraine Winstanley 67.09	3
Robyn Byrne 72.49	5

== October ==
=== Women's Series 21 ===
Women's Series 21 was contested on Saturday 19 October 2024, at the Leicester Arena in Leicester.

The event was won by Noa-Lynn van Leuven, who defeated Beau Greaves 5–3 in the final. The result meant van Leuven qualified for the 2025 PDC World Darts Championship.

Quarter-finals (best of 9 legs)
Lorraine Hyde 75.91	5
Neuza Araujo 77.09	4
Noa-Lynn van Leuven 77.20	5
Lisa Ashton 78.44	4
Gemma Hayter 82.75	3
Beau Greaves 91.21	5
Steph Clarke 68.52	0
Lorraine Winstanley 79.11	5

Semi-finals (best of 9 legs)
Lorraine Hyde 77.22	3
Noa-Lynn van Leuven 89.59	5
Beau Greaves 81.56	5
Lorraine Winstanley 75.14	1

Final (best of 9 legs)
Noa-Lynn van Leuven 109.64	5
Beau Greaves 89.37	3

=== Women's Series 22 ===
Women's Series 22 was contested on Saturday 19 October 2024 at the Leicester Arena in Leicester.

The event was won by Beau Greaves, who defeated Fallon Sherrock 5–1 in the final.

Quarter-finals (best of 9 legs)
Lorraine Hyde 78.74	3
Noa-Lynn van Leuven 88.36	5
Fallon Sherrock 85.70	5
Rhian O'Sullivan 69.38	2
Beau Greaves 90.48	5
Angela Kirkwood 80.63	1
Lisa Ashton 81.68	3
Gemma Hayter 87.56	5

Semi-finals (best of 9 legs)
Noa-Lynn van Leuven 78.00	1
Fallon Sherrock 78.88	5
Beau Greaves 91.31	5
Gemma Hayter 88.59	1

Final (best of 9 legs)
Fallon Sherrock 85.22	1
Beau Greaves 89.63	5

=== Women's Series 23 ===
Women's Series 23 was contested on Sunday 20 October 2024 at the Leicester Arena in Leicester.

The event was won by Fallon Sherrock who defeated Mikuru Suzuki 5–2 in the final. The result meant Sherrock qualified for the 2025 PDC World Darts Championship.

Quarter-finals (best of 9 legs)
Steph Clarke 71.94	5
Kirsi Viinikainen 71.48	3
Katie Sheldon 74.50	2
Fallon Sherrock 82.83	5
Jo Locke 78.72	2
Mikuru Suzuki 80.21	5
Lisa Ashton 75.82	3
Noa-Lynn van Leuven 83.87	5

Semi-finals (best of 9 legs)
Steph Clarke 67.98	2
Fallon Sherrock 77.07	5
Mikuru Suzuki 80.95	5
Noa-Lynn van Leuven 85.64	3

Final (best of 9 legs)
Fallon Sherrock 83.11	5
Mikuru Suzuki 79.24	2

=== Women's Series 24 ===
Women's Series 24 was contested on Sunday 20 October 2024 at the Leicester Arena in Leicester.

The event was won by Angela Kirkwood who defeated Anastasia Dobromyslova 5–4 in the final. The result meant Noa-Lynn van Leuven qualified for the 2024 Grand Slam of Darts.

Quarter-finals (best of 9 legs)
Robyn Byrne 81.75	5
Felicia Blay 71.50	4
Anastasia Dobromyslova 78.74	5
Steph Clarke 72.51	3
Angela Kirkwood 73.18	5
Natalie Gilbert 73.79	4
Noa-Lynn van Leuven 75.49	4
Neuza Araujo 75.66	5

Semi-finals (best of 9 legs)
Robyn Byrne 75.65	2
Anastasia Dobromyslova (Note: Anastasia Dobromyslova has competed under a neutral designation since the 2022 Russian invasion of Ukraine.) 76.28	5
Angela Kirkwood 68.85	5
Neuza Araujo 73.26	4

Final (best of 9 legs)
Anastasia Dobromyslova 66.22	4
Angela Kirkwood 68.83	5

== Orders of Merit ==
=== Women's World Matchplay Race ===
2024 Women's World Matchplay Raceafter 24/24 events(Cut-off: 16 June 2024)
Rank	Player	Prize money
1	Beau Greaves	£25,100
2	Fallon Sherrock	£18,800
3	Lisa Ashton	£12,600
4	Mikuru Suzuki	£12,500
5	Noa-Lynn van Leuven	£8,700
6	Rhian O'Sullivan	£7,500
7	Anastasia Dobromyslova (Note: Anastasia Dobromyslova has competed under a neutral designation since the 2022 Russian invasion of Ukraine.)	£5,000
8	Aileen de Graaf (Note: Aileen de Graaf, who occupied eighth position in the final 12-month Order of Merit, informed the PDC that she was unavailable to compete in Blackpool due to a prior commitment. As such, Katie Sheldon came into the field for the event.)	£4,700
9	Katie Sheldon	£4,200
10	Gemma Hayter	£4,000

=== Women's Series Order of Merit ===
2024 Women's Series final standingsafter 24/24 events
Rank	Player	Prize money
1	Beau Greaves (Note: Qualified for 2024 Grand Slam of Darts via another method.) (Note: Decided to play at 2024 WDF World Darts Championship after PDC didn't permit to play at two World Championships in one year.)	£24,200
2	Noa-Lynn van Leuven	£16,300
3	Fallon Sherrock	£14,100
4	Mikuru Suzuki	£11,000
5	Lisa Ashton	£10,100
6	Gemma Hayter	£7,700
7	Aileen de Graaf	£6,700
8	Robyn Byrne	£6,600
9	Lorraine Winstanley	£5,600
10	Rhian O'Sullivan	£5,200
