= Noa-Lynn van Leuven =

Dutch darts player (born 1996)

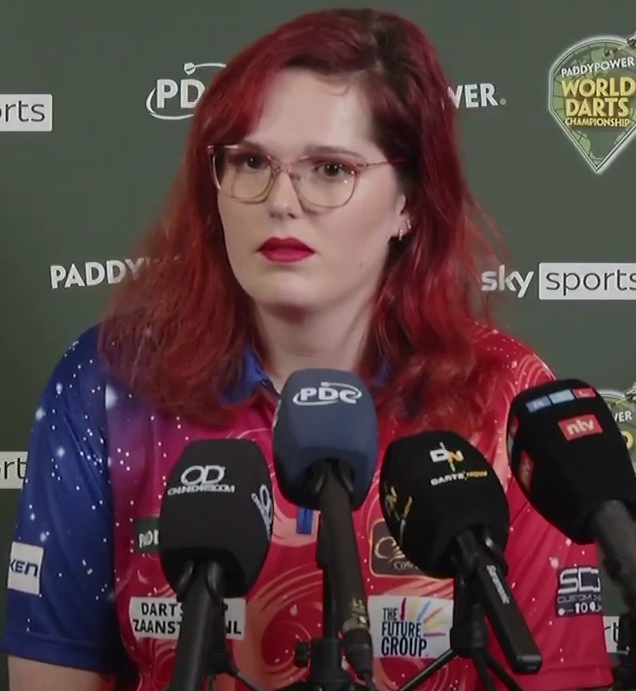
- van Leuven at the 2025 World Championship

Personal information
- Nickname: The Duchess
- Born: 27 September 1996 (age 30) Beverwijk, Netherlands
- Home town: Heemskerk, Netherlands

Sport
- Sport: Darts
- Darts: 24g Cosmo
- Laterality: Right-handed
- Walk-on music: "Euphoria" by Loreen

Organisation (see split in darts)
- PDC: 2022–present
- WDF: 2022–present

WDF major events – best performances
- World Masters: Last 32: 2022
- Dutch Open: Semi-final: 2023, 2024

PDC premier events – best performances
- World Championship: Last 96: 2025
- Grand Slam: Group Stage: 2024

Other tournament wins
- Years
Belgium Open	2023
Denmark Open	2023
Malta Masters	2023
Malta Open	2023
PDC Challenge Tour	2024
PDC Women's Series (x6)	2024 (x4); 2025 (x2)
Medal record
Women's Darts
Representing Netherlands
WDF Europe Cup
Gold medal – first place	2024 Šamorín	Women's pairs
Gold medal – first place	2024 Šamorín	Women's team
Gold medal – first place	2024 Šamorín	Women's overall
Silver medal – second place	2022 Gandía	Women's team
Silver medal – second place	2024 Šamorín	Women's singles
Bronze medal – third place	2022 Gandía	Women's overall

Noa-Lynn van Leuven (born 27 September 1996) is a Dutch darts player who competes both in World Darts Federation (WDF) and Professional Darts Corporation (PDC) events. She was the first openly transgender person to compete in a televised darts tournament and the first to play at the PDC World Darts Championship, making her debut at the 2025 event. Van Leuven has won six titles on the PDC Women's Series, as well as a title on the 2024 PDC Challenge Tour.

Van Leuven competed on the Women's Series and in WDF women's tournaments until 2026, when both organisations barred trans women from competing in women's events. She is a two-time women's Dutch Open semi-finalist.

== Early life ==
Van Leuven began considering transitioning around the age of 16. She told the PA news agency that she had suffered depression beforehand, and that she "wouldn't be here" if not for her transition. Van Leuven had played darts for nine years before her transition, though she stopped for several years. She works as a chef de partie.

== Career ==
=== 2022 ===
Having passed stringent transitioning tests to play in women's darts, van Leuven made her debut at the 2022 PDC Women's Series.

Van Leuven reached the quarter-finals of both events 13 and 14 of the Women's Series, losing to Beau Greaves 4–2 and Laura Turner 4–3 respectively.

=== 2023 ===
At the 2023 Dutch Open, van Leuven entered the event as the 15th seed and reached the semi-finals. In the last 64 she whitewashed Jacqueline Geel 3–0 then defeated Evelien van Tol 4–1 in the last 32 before winning against Deta Hedman and Lorraine Hyde 4–3 in deciding legs. Van Leuven was whitewashed by eventual winner Aileen de Graaf 4–0 in the semi-finals.

Van Leuven played at the 2023 PDC Women's Series. She qualified for the 2023 Women's World Matchplay by finishing 8th in the Women's Matchplay Race. She did this by reaching the final of event twelve of the Women's series, where she was whitewashed 5–0 by Beau Greaves, to leapfrog 2022 Women's World Matchplay semi-finalist Lorraine Winstanley.

She played against Beau Greaves in the first round of the Women's World Matchplay, becoming the first trans woman to play in a televised PDC tournament. She was whitewashed 4–0 by Greaves.

=== 2024 ===
Van Leuven entered the 2024 Dutch Open as the 4th seed and reached the semi-finals again. She whitewashed Jaleesa Zegel 3–0, then defeated Kelly Streef, Tori Kewish and Kirsty Hutchinson each 4–1. Van Leuven lost in the semi-finals to the eventual winner, women's number one Beau Greaves.

Van Leuven played at the 2024 PDC Challenge Tour series, winning on her debut at event six.

Van Leuven played at the 2024 PDC Women's Series. She reached the quarter-finals at the first event, losing there to reigning WDF Women's World Champion Beau Greaves 5–2. At the second event, van Leuven won a Women's series tournament for the first time. She whitewashed Roos Van der Velde, Anca Zijlstra and Hannah Meek each 4–0 in legs. Van Leuven then defeated Marie Fitton 4–2 in the last 16. Van Leuven achieved 5–3 victories over Beau Greaves and Fallon Sherrock in the quarter-final and semi-final respectively before she triumphed over Katie Sheldon 5–2 in the final. This victory meant van Leuven had won both a women's tournament and a mixed gender tournament in the same week.

At event three of the Women's Series, van Leuven reached the quarter-finals again, winning against Eve Watson 4–3, whitewashing Snezana Veljkovic 4–0, defeating Chris Savvery 4–1 and beating Steph Clarke 4–2 before losing 5–4 to Lorraine Hyde.

At event four van Leuven defeated Casey Gallagher 4–1 and then whitewashed Angela Kirkwood and Carly Townsend 4–0 before losing 4–1 to Fallon Sherrock.

Van Leuven won Women's Series 21, defeating women's number one Beau Greaves 5–3 in the final, setting the record Women's Series average with 109.64. This result qualified her for the 2025 PDC World Darts Championship, making her the first trans woman to appear at the Alexandra Palace. She also became the first trans woman to play at the 2024 Grand Slam of Darts having finished second on the 2024 PDC Women's Series Order of Merit. However, she was eliminated in the group stages.

=== 2025 ===
At the 2025 PDC World Darts Championship, she lost 3–1 in sets to Kevin Doets.

After failing to gain a PDC Tour Card at the European Qualifying School, van Leuven took a break from the sport for mental health reasons. She returned for the 2025 PDC Women's Series.

After a slow start into the season, van Leuven won back-to-back Women's Series titles in Rosmalen on 12 April. She whitewashed Stefanie Lück 5–0 in the final of event 9 and defeated Rhian O'Sullivan 5–1 in the final of event 10.

== Controversy over participation ==
Controversy has arisen around Van Leuven's participation in women's darts events as a trans woman, as well as qualifying for televised mixed-gender events through the PDC Women's Series. Former Dutch national team teammates Anca Zijlstra and Aileen de Graaf resigned in protest at her inclusion; Van Leuven stated that comments they made about her were "incredibly painful". In a 2025 interview with Algemeen Dagblad, De Graaf highlighted her performance levels dropping while experiencing menstruation and believed it was unfair that trans women do not go through the same struggles. Deta Hedman – who has previously refused to play Van Leuven at World Darts Federation (WDF) events – has been outspoken in her opposition, citing the potential biological advantages transitioned players may have over biological female competitors. On 28 July 2025, the WDF announced changes to their eligibility criteria that restricted women's and girl's competitions to those who are assigned female at birth, effectively banning trans women from female competitions.

Professional Darts Corporation (PDC) chief executive Matt Porter defended the organisation's policy on transgender players as "fair", in response to Van Leuven's participation in televised PDC events. Following the 2025 UK Supreme Court ruling that defined the terms man, woman and sex in the Equality Act 2010 as in reference to biological sex, Porter reiterated his stance and dismissed any plans to change the PDC's policy on transgender players. Van Leuven received support from world champions Luke Humphries and Michael van Gerwen in 2024 and 2025.

In April 2026, the Darts Regulation Authority, which governs the PDC, banned trans women from competing in women's events with immediate effect. Van Leuven said that the decision "effectively retired" her.

== World Championship results ==
=== PDC World Championship ===
- 2025: First round (lost to Kevin Doets 1–3)
- 2026: First round (lost to Peter Wright 0–3)

== Performance timeline ==
Noa-Lynn van Leuven's performance timeline is as follows:

=== WDF ===
Tournament	2022	2023	2024
WDF Platinum ranked women's events
World Masters	3R	NH	DNP
Dutch Open	DNP	SF	SF

=== PDC ===
Tournament	2023	2024	2025	2026
PDC Ranked televised events
World Championship	DNQ		1R	1R
Grand Slam	DNQ	RR	DNQ	
PDC Televised women's events
Women's World Matchplay	QF	QF	SF	DQ
Career statistics
Season-end ranking (PDC)	–	130	144	

=== PDC Players Championships ===
Season	1	2	3	4	5	6	7	8	9	10	11	12	13	14	15	16	17	18	19	20	21	22	23	24	25	26	27	28	29	30
2024 (Note: Not a Tour card holder)	Did not participate								HIL; 1R	HIL; 1R	HIL; 1R	HIL; 1R	Did not participate																	

=== PDC Women's Series ===
Season	1	2	3	4	5	6	7	8	9	10	11	12	13	14	15	16	17	18	19	20	21	22	23	24
2022	Did not participate								L64	L64	L32	L32	QF	QF	L32	L32	L64	L64	L128	L32				
2023	L16	L32	QF	QF	L64	L128	L64	F	L32	L64	L32	F	L16	L64	QF	QF	QF	L64	SF	L32	L128	L32	L32	QF
2024	QF	W	QF	L16	W	SF	L32	SF		L32	QF	L16	F	QF	W	F	SF	F	L16	SF	W	SF	SF	QF
2025	QF	L16	L128	L64	QF	L16	QF	L32	W	W	L16	L16	QF	QF	L64	L128	SF	QF	L16	L16	QF	SF	L16	F
2026	L32	L16	L16	L32	L32	SF	L32	L128	No longer eligible															

Performance Table Legend
W	Won the tournament	F	Finalist	SF	Semifinalist	QF	Quarterfinalist	#R; RR; L#	Lost in # round Round-robin; Last # stage	DQ	Disqualified
DNQ	Did not qualify	DNP	Did not participate	WD	Withdrew	NH	Tournament not held	#R; RR; L#	Lost in # round Round-robin; Last # stage	NYF	Not yet founded
