= 2024 Grand Slam of Darts =

Tournament information
- Dates: 9–17 November 2024
- Venue: Aldersley Leisure Village
- Location: Wolverhampton, England
- Organisation(s): Professional Darts Corporation (PDC)
- Format: Legs
- Prize fund: £650,000
- Winner's share: £150,000
- High checkout: 170; Danny Noppert; Stephen Bunting

Champion(s)
- Luke Littler

The 2024 Grand Slam of Darts (known for sponsorship reasons as the 2024 Mr Vegas Grand Slam of Darts) was a professional darts tournament that was held at Aldersley Leisure Village in Wolverhampton, England from 9–17 November 2024. It was the eighteenth staging of the Grand Slam of Darts organised by the Professional Darts Corporation.

Luke Humphries was the defending champion, having defeated Rob Cross 16–8 in the 2023 final. He was eliminated in the group stage, after losing his first two matches. Michael van Gerwen was eliminated in the group stage for the first time since 2010, while 2022 champion Michael Smith was also unable to qualify from his group, meaning all former champions present at the tournament were eliminated before the knockout stage.

Luke Littler won the tournament, defeating Martin Lukeman 16–3 in the final for his first ranking major title.

== Prize money ==
The prize fund for the Grand Slam remained the same as last year at £650,000.

| Position (num. of players) | | Prize money (Total: £650,000) |
|---|---|---|
| Winner | (1) | £150,000 |
| Runner-up | (1) | £70,000 |
| Semi-finalists | (2) | £50,000 |
| Quarter-finalists | (4) | £25,000 |
| Last 16 | (8) | £12,250 |
| Third in group | (8) | £8,000 |
| Fourth in group | (8) | £5,000 |
| Group winner bonus | (8) | £3,500 |
| Nine Dart Finish | n/a | £10,000 |

== Qualification ==
The qualifying criteria for the Grand Slam were as follows:

- Finalists from PDC televised events over the previous twelve months (up to a maximum of 16 players),
- Additional qualifiers (up to a maximum of 8 players),
- European Tour events winners (to fill up to 24 players),
- Players Championship event winners (to fill up to 24 players)

The qualifiers were:

=== PDC Televised Event Finalists ===
| Tournament | Year | Position | Player | Qualifiers |
|---|---|---|---|---|
| PDC World Darts Championship | 2024 | Winner | Luke Humphries | Luke Humphries; Luke Littler; Mike De Decker; Stephen Bunting; Dimitri Van den Bergh; Ritchie Edhouse; Michael Smith; Rob Cross; Michael van Gerwen; Jermaine Wattimena; Rowby-John Rodriguez; Mensur Suljović |
| Grand Slam of Darts | 2023 | Winner | Luke Humphries | Luke Humphries; Luke Littler; Mike De Decker; Stephen Bunting; Dimitri Van den Bergh; Ritchie Edhouse; Michael Smith; Rob Cross; Michael van Gerwen; Jermaine Wattimena; Rowby-John Rodriguez; Mensur Suljović |
| Premier League Darts | 2024 | Winner | Luke Littler | Luke Humphries; Luke Littler; Mike De Decker; Stephen Bunting; Dimitri Van den Bergh; Ritchie Edhouse; Michael Smith; Rob Cross; Michael van Gerwen; Jermaine Wattimena; Rowby-John Rodriguez; Mensur Suljović |
| World Matchplay | 2024 | Winner | Luke Humphries | Luke Humphries; Luke Littler; Mike De Decker; Stephen Bunting; Dimitri Van den Bergh; Ritchie Edhouse; Michael Smith; Rob Cross; Michael van Gerwen; Jermaine Wattimena; Rowby-John Rodriguez; Mensur Suljović |
| World Grand Prix | 2024 | Winner | Mike De Decker | Luke Humphries; Luke Littler; Mike De Decker; Stephen Bunting; Dimitri Van den Bergh; Ritchie Edhouse; Michael Smith; Rob Cross; Michael van Gerwen; Jermaine Wattimena; Rowby-John Rodriguez; Mensur Suljović |
| Masters | 2024 | Winner | Stephen Bunting | Luke Humphries; Luke Littler; Mike De Decker; Stephen Bunting; Dimitri Van den Bergh; Ritchie Edhouse; Michael Smith; Rob Cross; Michael van Gerwen; Jermaine Wattimena; Rowby-John Rodriguez; Mensur Suljović |
| UK Open | 2024 | Winner | Dimitri Van den Bergh | Luke Humphries; Luke Littler; Mike De Decker; Stephen Bunting; Dimitri Van den Bergh; Ritchie Edhouse; Michael Smith; Rob Cross; Michael van Gerwen; Jermaine Wattimena; Rowby-John Rodriguez; Mensur Suljović |
| European Championship | 2024 | Winner | Ritchie Edhouse | Luke Humphries; Luke Littler; Mike De Decker; Stephen Bunting; Dimitri Van den Bergh; Ritchie Edhouse; Michael Smith; Rob Cross; Michael van Gerwen; Jermaine Wattimena; Rowby-John Rodriguez; Mensur Suljović |
| Players Championship Finals | 2023 | Winner | Luke Humphries | Luke Humphries; Luke Littler; Mike De Decker; Stephen Bunting; Dimitri Van den Bergh; Ritchie Edhouse; Michael Smith; Rob Cross; Michael van Gerwen; Jermaine Wattimena; Rowby-John Rodriguez; Mensur Suljović |
| World Series of Darts Finals | 2024 | Winner | Luke Littler | Luke Humphries; Luke Littler; Mike De Decker; Stephen Bunting; Dimitri Van den Bergh; Ritchie Edhouse; Michael Smith; Rob Cross; Michael van Gerwen; Jermaine Wattimena; Rowby-John Rodriguez; Mensur Suljović |
| PDC World Cup of Darts | 2024 | Winners | Luke Humphries; Michael Smith | Luke Humphries; Luke Littler; Mike De Decker; Stephen Bunting; Dimitri Van den Bergh; Ritchie Edhouse; Michael Smith; Rob Cross; Michael van Gerwen; Jermaine Wattimena; Rowby-John Rodriguez; Mensur Suljović |
| PDC World Darts Championship | 2024 | Runner-up | Luke Littler | Luke Humphries; Luke Littler; Mike De Decker; Stephen Bunting; Dimitri Van den Bergh; Ritchie Edhouse; Michael Smith; Rob Cross; Michael van Gerwen; Jermaine Wattimena; Rowby-John Rodriguez; Mensur Suljović |
| Grand Slam of Darts | 2023 | Runner-up | Rob Cross | Luke Humphries; Luke Littler; Mike De Decker; Stephen Bunting; Dimitri Van den Bergh; Ritchie Edhouse; Michael Smith; Rob Cross; Michael van Gerwen; Jermaine Wattimena; Rowby-John Rodriguez; Mensur Suljović |
| Premier League Darts | 2024 | Runner-up | Luke Humphries | Luke Humphries; Luke Littler; Mike De Decker; Stephen Bunting; Dimitri Van den Bergh; Ritchie Edhouse; Michael Smith; Rob Cross; Michael van Gerwen; Jermaine Wattimena; Rowby-John Rodriguez; Mensur Suljović |
| World Matchplay | 2024 | Runner-up | Michael van Gerwen | Luke Humphries; Luke Littler; Mike De Decker; Stephen Bunting; Dimitri Van den Bergh; Ritchie Edhouse; Michael Smith; Rob Cross; Michael van Gerwen; Jermaine Wattimena; Rowby-John Rodriguez; Mensur Suljović |
| World Grand Prix | 2024 | Runner-up | Luke Humphries | Luke Humphries; Luke Littler; Mike De Decker; Stephen Bunting; Dimitri Van den Bergh; Ritchie Edhouse; Michael Smith; Rob Cross; Michael van Gerwen; Jermaine Wattimena; Rowby-John Rodriguez; Mensur Suljović |
| Masters | 2024 | Runner-up | Michael van Gerwen | Luke Humphries; Luke Littler; Mike De Decker; Stephen Bunting; Dimitri Van den Bergh; Ritchie Edhouse; Michael Smith; Rob Cross; Michael van Gerwen; Jermaine Wattimena; Rowby-John Rodriguez; Mensur Suljović |
| UK Open | 2024 | Runner-up | Luke Humphries | Luke Humphries; Luke Littler; Mike De Decker; Stephen Bunting; Dimitri Van den Bergh; Ritchie Edhouse; Michael Smith; Rob Cross; Michael van Gerwen; Jermaine Wattimena; Rowby-John Rodriguez; Mensur Suljović |
| European Championship | 2024 | Runner-up | Jermaine Wattimena | Luke Humphries; Luke Littler; Mike De Decker; Stephen Bunting; Dimitri Van den Bergh; Ritchie Edhouse; Michael Smith; Rob Cross; Michael van Gerwen; Jermaine Wattimena; Rowby-John Rodriguez; Mensur Suljović |
| Players Championship Finals | 2023 | Runner-up | Michael van Gerwen | Luke Humphries; Luke Littler; Mike De Decker; Stephen Bunting; Dimitri Van den Bergh; Ritchie Edhouse; Michael Smith; Rob Cross; Michael van Gerwen; Jermaine Wattimena; Rowby-John Rodriguez; Mensur Suljović |
| World Series of Darts Finals | 2024 | Runner-up | Michael Smith | Luke Humphries; Luke Littler; Mike De Decker; Stephen Bunting; Dimitri Van den Bergh; Ritchie Edhouse; Michael Smith; Rob Cross; Michael van Gerwen; Jermaine Wattimena; Rowby-John Rodriguez; Mensur Suljović |
| PDC World Cup of Darts | 2024 | Runners-up | Rowby-John Rodriguez; Mensur Suljović | Luke Humphries; Luke Littler; Mike De Decker; Stephen Bunting; Dimitri Van den Bergh; Ritchie Edhouse; Michael Smith; Rob Cross; Michael van Gerwen; Jermaine Wattimena; Rowby-John Rodriguez; Mensur Suljović |

=== Additional Qualifiers ===
| Tournament | Year | Position | Player |
|---|---|---|---|
| PDC World Youth Championship | 2023 | Winner | Luke Littler |
| PDC World Youth Championship | 2023 | Runner-up | Gian van Veen |
| PDC Challenge Tour | 2024 | Order of Merit Winner | Connor Scutt |
| PDC Development Tour | 2024 | Order of Merit Winner | Wessel Nijman |
| Women's World Matchplay | 2024 | Winner | Beau Greaves |
| PDC Women's Series | 2024 | Order of Merit Winner | Beau Greaves |
| PDC Women's Series | 2024 | Order of Merit Runner-up | Noa-Lynn van Leuven |
| PDC Asian Championship | 2024 | Winner | Lourence Ilagan |
| CDC Continental Cup | 2024 | Winner | Leonard Gates |

=== European Tour ===
As the list of qualifiers did yet not fill twenty-four places, the remaining places were filled with winners from 2024 European Tour events who were not yet qualified, in which the winners were ordered firstly by number of wins, then Order of Merit position order at the cut-off date.

| Event | Player | Qualifiers |
|---|---|---|
| Belgian Darts Open | Luke Littler | Dave Chisnall; Martin Schindler; Peter Wright; Josh Rock; Gary Anderson |
| German Darts Grand Prix | Luke Humphries | Dave Chisnall; Martin Schindler; Peter Wright; Josh Rock; Gary Anderson |
| International Darts Open | Martin Schindler | Dave Chisnall; Martin Schindler; Peter Wright; Josh Rock; Gary Anderson |
| European Darts Grand Prix | Gary Anderson | Dave Chisnall; Martin Schindler; Peter Wright; Josh Rock; Gary Anderson |
| Austrian Darts Open | Luke Littler (2) | Dave Chisnall; Martin Schindler; Peter Wright; Josh Rock; Gary Anderson |
| Baltic Sea Darts Open | Rob Cross | Dave Chisnall; Martin Schindler; Peter Wright; Josh Rock; Gary Anderson |
| Dutch Darts Championship | Josh Rock | Dave Chisnall; Martin Schindler; Peter Wright; Josh Rock; Gary Anderson |
| European Darts Open | Dave Chisnall | Dave Chisnall; Martin Schindler; Peter Wright; Josh Rock; Gary Anderson |
| German Darts Championship | Peter Wright | Dave Chisnall; Martin Schindler; Peter Wright; Josh Rock; Gary Anderson |
| Flanders Darts Trophy | Dave Chisnall (2) | Dave Chisnall; Martin Schindler; Peter Wright; Josh Rock; Gary Anderson |
| Hungarian Darts Trophy | Michael van Gerwen | Dave Chisnall; Martin Schindler; Peter Wright; Josh Rock; Gary Anderson |
| Swiss Darts Trophy | Martin Schindler (2) | Dave Chisnall; Martin Schindler; Peter Wright; Josh Rock; Gary Anderson |
| Czech Darts Open | Luke Humphries (2) | Dave Chisnall; Martin Schindler; Peter Wright; Josh Rock; Gary Anderson |

If there were still less than the 24 qualified players after the winners of the European Tour events are added, then the winners of the 2024 PDC Players Championship series events would've been added, firstly by winners of multiple events then by Order of Merit order, but that was not required for this year's edition.

=== PDC Tour Card Holder Qualifying Event ===
A further eight places were filled by qualifiers from a PDC Tour Card Holder qualifier held on 1 November in Leicester.

These were the qualifiers:

- Keane Barry
- Martin Lukeman
- Ryan Joyce
- Danny Noppert
- Cameron Menzies
- James Wade
- Mickey Mansell
- Ross Smith

== Pools ==
| Pool A | Pool B | Pool C | Pool D |
| (Seeded Players) | (Qualifiers) | | |
|---|---|---|---|
| Luke Humphries (1) Michael Smith (2) Michael van Gerwen (3) Rob Cross (4); Dave Chisnall (5) Stephen Bunting (6) Dimitri Van den Bergh (7) Danny Noppert (8) | Peter Wright; Josh Rock; James Wade; Luke Littler; Gary Anderson; Ross Smith; Martin Schindler; Mike De Decker | Ritchie Edhouse; Gian van Veen; Ryan Joyce; Jermaine Wattimena; Cameron Menzies; Martin Lukeman; Keane Barry; Mickey Mansell | Mensur Suljović; Wessel Nijman; Rowby-John Rodriguez; Connor Scutt; Leonard Gates; Beau Greaves; Lourence Ilagan; Noa-Lynn van Leuven |

== Group stage ==
All group matches are best of nine legs.
After three games, the top two in each group qualify for the knock-out stage.

NB: P = Played; W = Won; L = Lost; LF = Legs for; LA = Legs against; +/− = Plus/minus record, in relation to legs; Pts = Points; Status = Qualified to knockout stage

=== Group A ===
| Pos. | Player | P | W | L | LF | LA | +/− | Pts | Status |
|---|---|---|---|---|---|---|---|---|---|
| 1 | James Wade | 3 | 2 | 1 | 13 | 9 | +4 | 4 | Q |
| 2 | Mickey Mansell | 3 | 2 | 1 | 11 | 11 | 0 | 4 | Q |
| 3 | Luke Humphries (1) | 3 | 1 | 2 | 11 | 11 | 0 | 2 | Eliminated |
| 4 | Rowby-John Rodriguez | 3 | 1 | 2 | 9 | 13 | –4 | 2 | Eliminated |

9 November

| James Wade 103.12 | 3–5 | Mickey Mansell 100.87 |
| Luke Humphries 97.64 | 3–5 | Rowby-John Rodriguez 92.95 |

10 November

| Mickey Mansell 97.27 | 5–3 | Rowby-John Rodriguez 93.82 |
| Luke Humphries 95.80 | 3–5 | James Wade 87.73 |

11 November

| Luke Humphries 101.52 | 5–1 | Mickey Mansell 94.32 |
| James Wade 87.48 | 5–1 | Rowby-John Rodriguez 86.81 |

=== Group B ===
| Pos. | Player | P | W | L | LF | LA | +/− | Pts | Status |
|---|---|---|---|---|---|---|---|---|---|
| 1 | Danny Noppert (8) | 3 | 3 | 0 | 15 | 8 | +7 | 6 | Q |
| 2 | Cameron Menzies | 3 | 1 | 2 | 10 | 12 | –2 | 2 | Q |
| 3 | Martin Schindler | 3 | 1 | 2 | 9 | 11 | –2 | 2 | Eliminated |
| 4 | Beau Greaves | 3 | 1 | 2 | 8 | 11 | –3 | 2 | Eliminated |

9 November

| Danny Noppert 94.79 | 5–2 | Beau Greaves 91.92 |
| Martin Schindler 91.11 | 2–5 | Cameron Menzies 98.91 |

10 November

| Danny Noppert 96.76 | 5–4 | Cameron Menzies 90.44 |
| Martin Schindler 98.44 | 5–1 | Beau Greaves 83.43 |

11 November

| Cameron Menzies 89.80 | 1–5 | Beau Greaves 95.17 |
| Danny Noppert 106.28 | 5–2 | Martin Schindler 109.15 |

=== Group C ===
| Pos. | Player | P | W | L | LF | LA | +/− | Pts | Status |
|---|---|---|---|---|---|---|---|---|---|
| 1 | Martin Lukeman | 3 | 3 | 0 | 15 | 6 | +9 | 6 | Q |
| 2 | Rob Cross (4) | 3 | 2 | 1 | 13 | 8 | +5 | 4 | Q |
| 3 | Leonard Gates | 3 | 1 | 2 | 10 | 14 | –4 | 2 | Eliminated |
| 4 | Peter Wright | 3 | 0 | 3 | 5 | 15 | –10 | 0 | Eliminated |

9 November

| Rob Cross 95.04 | 5–2 | Leonard Gates 87.65 |
| Peter Wright 84.75 | 0–5 | Martin Lukeman 98.88 |

10 November

| Peter Wright 83.44 | 4–5 | Leonard Gates 83.31 |
| Rob Cross 98.51 | 3–5 | Martin Lukeman 87.96 |

11 November

| Martin Lukeman 93.56 | 5–3 | Leonard Gates 85.09 |
| Rob Cross 91.21 | 5–1 | Peter Wright 83.55 |

=== Group D ===
| Pos. | Player | P | W | L | LF | LA | +/− | Pts | Status |
|---|---|---|---|---|---|---|---|---|---|
| 1 | Ritchie Edhouse | 3 | 3 | 0 | 15 | 5 | +10 | 6 | Q |
| 2 | Ross Smith | 3 | 2 | 1 | 11 | 7 | +4 | 4 | Q |
| 3 | Connor Scutt | 3 | 1 | 2 | 7 | 10 | –3 | 2 | Eliminated |
| 4 | Dave Chisnall (5) | 3 | 0 | 3 | 4 | 15 | –11 | 0 | Eliminated |

9 November

| Dave Chisnall 93.35 | 0–5 | Connor Scutt 104.38 |
| Ross Smith 82.93 | 1–5 | Ritchie Edhouse 103.99 |

10 November

| Dave Chisnall 80.45 | 2–5 | Ross Smith 89.00 |
| Ritchie Edhouse 84.03 | 5–2 | Connor Scutt 85.87 |

11 November

| Dave Chisnall 86.16 | 2–5 | Ritchie Edhouse 105.00 |
| Ross Smith 97.60 | 5–0 | Connor Scutt 85.42 |

=== Group E ===
| Pos. | Player | P | W | L | LF | LA | +/− | Pts | Status |
|---|---|---|---|---|---|---|---|---|---|
| 1 | Jermaine Wattimena | 3 | 3 | 0 | 15 | 7 | +8 | 6 | Q |
| 2 | Mike De Decker | 3 | 2 | 1 | 12 | 7 | +5 | 4 | Q |
| 3 | Michael Smith (2) | 3 | 1 | 2 | 6 | 12 | –6 | 2 | Eliminated |
| 4 | Mensur Suljović | 3 | 0 | 3 | 8 | 15 | –7 | 0 | Eliminated |

9 November

| Michael Smith 99.80 | 5–2 | Mensur Suljović 98.62 |
| Mike De Decker 99.06 | 2–5 | Jermaine Wattimena 104.32 |

10 November

| Mike De Decker 88.77 | 5–2 | Mensur Suljović 78.66 |
| Michael Smith 92.93 | 1–5 | Jermaine Wattimena 97.50 |

12 November

| Jermaine Wattimena 95.95 | 5–4 | Mensur Suljović 98.77 |
| Michael Smith 90.91 | 0–5 | Mike De Decker 100.20 |

=== Group F ===
| Pos. | Player | P | W | L | LF | LA | +/− | Pts | Status |
|---|---|---|---|---|---|---|---|---|---|
| 1 | Luke Littler | 3 | 3 | 0 | 15 | 4 | +11 | 6 | Q |
| 2 | Dimitri Van den Bergh (7) | 3 | 2 | 1 | 11 | 7 | +4 | 4 | Q |
| 3 | Keane Barry | 3 | 1 | 2 | 6 | 13 | –7 | 2 | Eliminated |
| 4 | Lourence Ilagan | 3 | 0 | 3 | 7 | 15 | –8 | 0 | Eliminated |

9 November

| Dimitri Van den Bergh 86.76 | 5–1 | Lourence Ilagan 82.71 |
| Luke Littler 112.16 | 5–0 | Keane Barry 93.10 |

10 November

| Keane Barry 88.93 | 5–3 | Lourence Ilagan 96.63 |
| Dimitri Van den Bergh 92.78 | 1–5 | Luke Littler 106.98 |

12 November

| Luke Littler 102.05 | 5–3 | Lourence Ilagan 91.57 |
| Dimitri Van den Bergh 104.58 | 5–1 | Keane Barry 83.96 |

=== Group G ===
| Pos. | Player | P | W | L | LF | LA | +/− | Pts | Status |
|---|---|---|---|---|---|---|---|---|---|
| 1 | Gary Anderson | 3 | 3 | 0 | 15 | 7 | +8 | 6 | Q |
| 2 | Ryan Joyce | 3 | 2 | 1 | 11 | 12 | –1 | 4 | Q |
| 3 | Michael van Gerwen (3) | 3 | 1 | 2 | 13 | 10 | +3 | 2 | Eliminated |
| 4 | Noa-Lynn van Leuven | 3 | 0 | 3 | 5 | 15 | −10 | 0 | Eliminated |

9 November

| Gary Anderson 113.20 | 5–1 | Ryan Joyce 89.85 |
| Michael van Gerwen 96.35 | 5–0 | Noa-Lynn van Leuven 86.48 |

10 November

| Ryan Joyce 87.36 | 5–3 | Noa-Lynn van Leuven 81.39 |
| Michael van Gerwen 90.12 | 4–5 | Gary Anderson 105.19 |

12 November

| Gary Anderson 95.75 | 5–2 | Noa-Lynn van Leuven 85.85 |
| Michael van Gerwen 93.43 | 4–5 | Ryan Joyce 93.45 |

=== Group H ===
| Pos. | Player | P | W | L | LF | LA | +/− | Pts | Status |
|---|---|---|---|---|---|---|---|---|---|
| 1 | Gian van Veen | 3 | 3 | 0 | 15 | 7 | +8 | 6 | Q |
| 2 | Stephen Bunting (6) | 3 | 2 | 1 | 11 | 11 | 0 | 4 | Q |
| 3 | Josh Rock | 3 | 1 | 2 | 9 | 13 | –4 | 2 | Eliminated |
| 4 | Wessel Nijman | 3 | 0 | 3 | 11 | 15 | –4 | 0 | Eliminated |

9 November

| Stephen Bunting 103.02 | 5–4 | Wessel Nijman 106.51 |
| Josh Rock 105.83 | 2–5 | Gian van Veen 110.39 |

10 November

| Josh Rock 99.06 | 5–3 | Wessel Nijman 105.39 |
| Stephen Bunting 104.17 | 1–5 | Gian van Veen 114.71 |

12 November

| Gian van Veen 103.99 | 5–4 | Wessel Nijman 111.10 |
| Stephen Bunting 106.66 | 5–2 | Josh Rock 99.64 |

== Knockout stage ==
Second round (best of 19 legs); 13–14 November
A1 | James Wade 95.92 | 9
B2 | Cameron Menzies 93.50 | 10
B1 | Danny Noppert 95.71 (8) | 7
A2 | Mickey Mansell 99.05 | 10
C1 | Martin Lukeman 95.75 | 10
D2 | Ross Smith 94.85 | 5
D1 | Ritchie Edhouse 94.13 | 4
C2 | Rob Cross 98.68 (4) | 10
E1 | Jermaine Wattimena 91.19 | 10
F2 | Dimitri Van den Bergh 91.90 (7) | 9
F1 | Luke Littler 103.48 | 10
E2 | Mike De Decker 104.49 | 9
G1 | Gary Anderson 99.95 | 10
H2 | Stephen Bunting 98.96 (6) | 6
H1 | Gian van Veen 106.45 | 10
G2 | Ryan Joyce 93.84 | 2

Quarter-finals (best of 31 legs); 15–16 November
B2 | Cameron Menzies 88.21 | 15
A2 | Mickey Mansell 91.19 | 16
C1 | Martin Lukeman 98.34 | 16
C2 | Rob Cross 94.63 (4) | 11
E1 | Jermaine Wattimena 92.69 | 2
F1 | Luke Littler 105.11 | 16
G1 | Gary Anderson 99.13 | 16
H1 | Gian van Veen 97.38 | 14

Semi-finals (best of 31 legs); 17 November
A2 | Mickey Mansell 92.28 | 12
C1 | Martin Lukeman 99.66 | 16
F1 | Luke Littler 103.81 | 16
G1 | Gary Anderson 100.17 | 15

Final (best of 31 legs); 17 November
C1 | Martin Lukeman 93.42 | 3
F1 | Luke Littler 107.08 | 16

== Top averages ==
The table lists all players who achieved an average of at least 100 in a match. If any player has multiple records, this is indicated by the number in brackets.

| # | Player | Round | Average | Result |
|---|---|---|---|---|
| 1 | Gian van Veen | Group Stage | 114.71 | Won |
| 2 | Gary Anderson | Group Stage | 113.20 | Won |
| 3 | Luke Littler | Group Stage | 112.16 | Won |
| 4 | Wessel Nijman | Group Stage | 111.10 | Lost |
| 5 | Gian van Veen (2) | Group Stage | 110.39 | Won |
| 6 | Martin Schindler | Group Stage | 109.15 | Lost |
| 7 | Luke Littler (2) | Final | 107.08 | Won |
| 8 | Luke Littler (3) | Group Stage | 106.98 | Won |
| 9 | Stephen Bunting | Group Stage | 106.66 | Won |
| 10 | Wessel Nijman (2) | Group Stage | 106.51 | Lost |
| 11 | Gian van Veen (3) | Second Round | 106.45 | Won |
| 12 | Danny Noppert | Group Stage | 106.28 | Won |
| 13 | Josh Rock | Group Stage | 105.83 | Lost |
| 14 | Wessel Nijman (3) | Group Stage | 105.39 | Lost |
| 15 | Gary Anderson (2) | Group Stage | 105.19 | Won |
| 16 | Luke Littler (4) | Quarter final | 105.11 | Won |
| 17 | Ritchie Edhouse | Group Stage | 105.00 | Won |
| 18 | Dimitri Van den Bergh | Group Stage | 104.58 | Won |
| 19 | Mike De Decker | Second Round | 104.49 | Lost |
| 20 | Connor Scutt | Group Stage | 104.38 | Won |
| 21 | Jermaine Wattimena | Group Stage | 104.32 | Won |
| 22 | Stephen Bunting (2) | Group Stage | 104.17 | Lost |
| 23 | Ritchie Edhouse (2) | Group Stage | 103.99 | Won |
| 23 | Gian van Veen (4) | Group Stage | 103.99 | Won |
| 24 | Stephen Bunting (3) | Group Stage | 103.82 | Won |
| 25 | Luke Littler (5) | Semi Final | 103.81 | Won |
| 26 | Luke Littler (6) | Second Round | 103.48 | Won |
| 27 | James Wade | Group Stage | 103.12 | Lost |
| 28 | Luke Littler (7) | Group Stage | 102.05 | Won |
| 29 | Luke Humphries | Group Stage | 101.52 | Won |
| 30 | Mickey Mansell | Group Stage | 100.87 | Won |
| 31 | Mike De Decker (2) | Group Stage | 100.20 | Won |
| 32 | Gary Anderson (3) | Semi Final | 100.17 | Lost |
