= John McDonald (commentator) =

British darts commentator

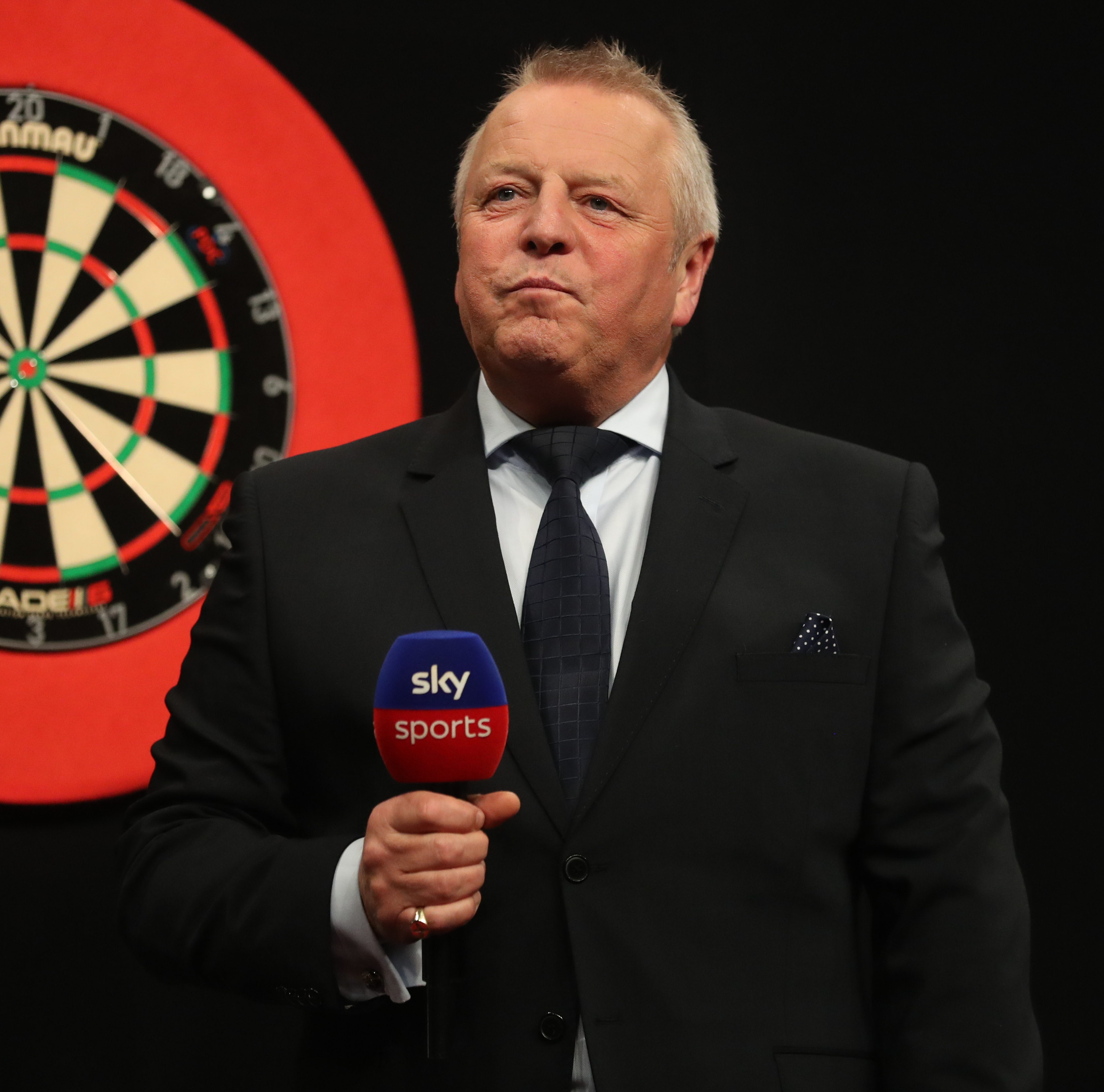
- McDonald in 2022
- Born: 7 August 1960 (age 66); London, England
- Occupations: Master of ceremonies, commentator
- Years active: 1992–2026

John McDonald (born 7 August 1960) is an English sports commentator and master of ceremonies. He is best known for his boxing and Professional Darts Corporation (PDC) commentary in the United Kingdom for various channels including ITV and Sky Sports.

== Life and career ==
McDonald was born in London. He started his career as a paratrooper in the British Army. From 1976 and 1994, McDonald travelled around the world to report from important sports events.

McDonald initially worked as a boxing photographer, but in 1992, he began working as an MC and commentator. McDonald has commentated on multiple Darts World Championship games. Throughout his career, McDonald has commentated on boxing, snooker, fishing, poker, tennis, table-tennis and darts for Sky Sports and ITV both in the United Kingdom and abroad.

In an interview with the Darts Show podcast, McDonald once revealed a horrifying parachute accident when he worked as a paratrooper in the British Army; I started to kick out and I realised I couldn't lower the equipment and I was getting more and more tangled. I was literally feet from the ground at that point when someone went underneath me and stole the air from the parachute, it completely collapsed and then I fell about 70 foot, upside down, feet were still in the rigging lines. All the equipment is still on into the ground, I remember nothing. Woke up six weeks later in a military hospital, couldn't move a muscle, couldn't feel any part of my body apart from my face.

After his time in the army, McDonald has been involved in organising for soldiers to attend sporting events, such as rugby or boxing matches. He also set up an organisation named Future Pathway, providing athletes and veterans free access to education.

In 2023, McDonald made headlines after accidentally announcing the wrong name for a darts player in the World Darts Championship. Darts player Keegan Brown was announced as Boris Krčmar.

In October 2025, it was announced that McDonald would retire from darts following the 2026 PDC World Darts Championship.
