= 2026 PDC World Darts Championship =

2025/26 Paddy Power World Darts Championship

Tournament information
- Dates: 11 December 2025 – 3 January 2026
- Venue: Alexandra Palace
- Location: London, England
- Organisation(s): Professional Darts Corporation (PDC)
- Format: Sets; Final – first to 7 sets
- Prize fund: £5,000,000
- Winner's share: £1,000,000
- High checkout: 170; See highest checkouts

Champion(s)
- Luke Littler (ENG)

The 2026 PDC World Darts Championship (known for sponsorship reasons as the 2025/26 Paddy Power World Darts Championship) was a professional darts tournament that took place from 11 December 2025 to 3 January 2026 at Alexandra Palace in London, England. The 33rd World Darts Championship organised by the Professional Darts Corporation (PDC), it was the 19th to be staged at Alexandra Palace, where it was held in the venue's West Hall for the final time; subsequent editions will take place in the Great Hall. The tournament's £5,000,000 prize fund was double that of the previous year, as were the prizes for the winner, runner-up, semi-finalists, and quarter-finalists. The winner received £1,000,000, the largest prize ever awarded in the history of professional darts.

The tournament featured a 128-player field, expanded from 96. The top 32 players on the PDC Order of Merit were seeded for the first round. A total of 28 players made their debut at the tournament, the most successful of whom was Justin Hood, who reached the quarter-finals. At age 71, Paul Lim became the oldest player to win a match at the tournament when he defeated Jeffrey de Graaf in the first round. Nitin Kumar, Stefan Bellmont, and David Munyua became the first Indian, Swiss, and Kenyan players respectively to win matches at a PDC World Championship.

Luke Littler was the defending champion, having defeated Michael van Gerwen 7–3 in the 2025 final. He reached his third consecutive final, where he faced Gian van Veen, who became the third Dutch player to reach a PDC World Championship final, following Raymond van Barneveld and Van Gerwen. Littler beat Van Veen 7–1 to win his second world title. He was the fourth player to retain the PDC world title, following Phil Taylor, Adrian Lewis, and Gary Anderson, and the first to do so since Anderson in the 2016 championship. Littler lost only four sets across the seven matches he played in the tournament. He also won the "Ballon d'Art" award for the most 180s at the tournament, with 73.

== Overview ==
=== Background ===
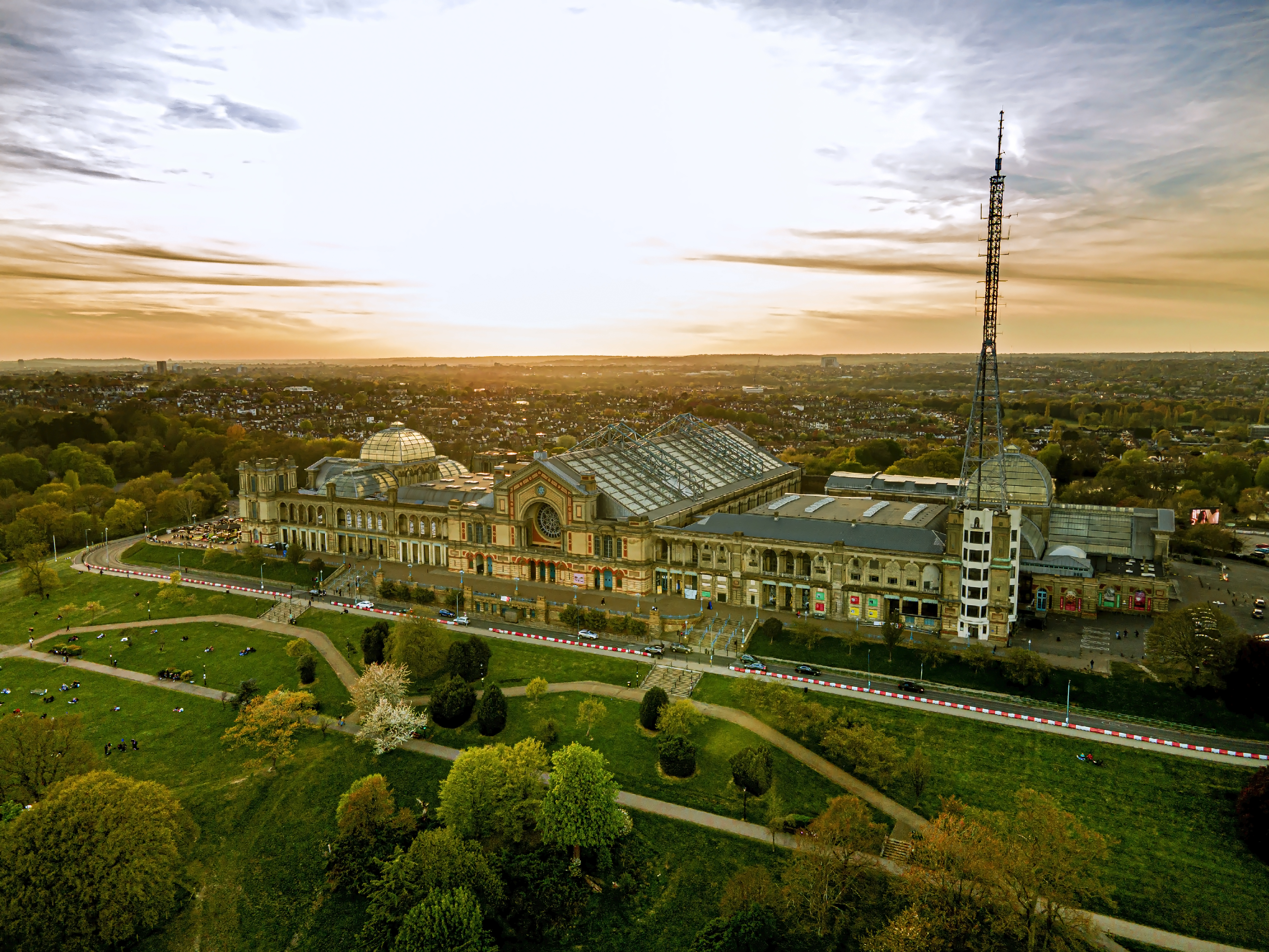
The tournament was held at Alexandra Palace in London, England.

The Professional Darts Corporation (PDC) was established under the World Darts Council name by the managers John Markovic, Tommy Cox and Dick Allix, along with the world's top 16 players in January 1992 as a separate body that broke away from the British Darts Organisation (BDO). The inaugural edition of the PDC World Darts Championship was held from December 1993 to January 1994 at the Circus Tavern in Purfleet, Essex, England. It was won by Dennis Priestley, who defeated Phil Taylor in the final on 2 January 1994. Taylor would go on to win the tournament 14 times, adding to his BDO World Darts Championship wins in 1990 and 1992 for a record total of 16 world titles, including eight in a row from 1995 to 2002. The PDC World Championship is one of two world championships in the game of darts; the other being the WDF World Darts Championship, which was first held in 2022 as the successor to the BDO event.

The 2026 tournament was held from 11 December 2025 to 3 January 2026 in London, England. It was the 33rd edition of the event and the 19th to be held at Alexandra Palace, which first served as host venue at the 2008 World Championship. The event was hosted in Alexandra Palace's West Hall for the final time as it will move to the venue's larger Great Hall for subsequent editions, staying there until at least 2031. Irish gambling company Paddy Power continued its sponsorship of the event, having agreed a three-year contract with the PDC ahead of the 2024 edition; in December 2025, it was announced that Paddy Power renewed their sponsorship until 2031.

A record-breaking total of 128 players competed at the event, expanded from the previous total of 96; the expanded field was announced by the PDC in March 2025. A new qualification structure was also introduced. Luke Littler entered the tournament as defending champion, having defeated three-time champion Michael van Gerwen 7–3 in the 2025 final to win his first world title and become the youngest darts world champion in history at 17 years and 347 days old. Littler was the bookmakers' pre-tournament favourite to win the championship.

=== Format ===
Under the new format, all players, including the 32 seeds, entered the tournament in the first round, a change from previous years where seeds entered in the second round. The matches were played in set format, with the amount of sets required to win a match increasing as the tournament progressed. All non-deciding sets were played to the best of five legs. In the deciding set, a tie-break rule was applied if the set score was 2–2, where the first player to lead by two legs won the set and the match; if the deciding set reached 5–5, the winner was decided by a sudden-death leg.

Round	Best of (sets)	First to (sets)
First & second	5	3
Third & fourth	7	4
Quarter-finals	9	5
Semi-finals	11	6
Final	13	7

=== Ranking ===
The PDC's main world ranking system, the PDC Order of Merit (known for sponsorship reasons as the Werner Rankings Ladder), is calculated on a two-year cycle. Prize money won by players in ranking tournaments are removed from their ranking after 104 weeks, meaning players who participated in the 2024 World Championship, who did not lose their PDC Tour Card during the two-year period, 'defended' their prize money from that event. At the end of the tournament, the prize money won at the 2026 tournament was added and the prize money won at the 2024 tournament was removed. After the tournament, the top 64 players in the PDC Order of Merit received a one-year extension on their Tour Card, joined by the players who earned two-year Tour Cards in 2025 who entered their second year in 2026. Players with two or more years on their Tour Card, who finished outside of the top 64, lost their Tour Card and saw their ranking reset to £0, along with all other players who earned prize money in ranking tournaments without holding a Tour Card.

=== Prize money ===
On 31 March 2025, the PDC announced the biggest prize money increase in the organisation's history, starting from the 2026 season onward. Coinciding with the expansion of the field to 128 players, the World Championship's total prize money increased to £5,000,000, with the winner's share doubling from £500,000 to £1,000,000; this was the first time the tournament's prize money increased since the 2019 edition. The winner also received the Sid Waddell Trophy, named in honour of the darts commentator who died in 2012. The prize money for the runner-up also doubled from £200,000 to £400,000; the prize money for semi-finalists doubled from £100,000 to £200,000; and prize money for the quarter-finalists doubled from £50,000 to £100,000. Like the previous year, tournament sponsor Paddy Power pledged that for every nine-dart finish hit during the tournament, they would award £60,000 to the player, a random fan, and Prostate Cancer UK.

The prize money breakdown is shown below:

Position (no. of players)		Prize money (Total: £5,000,000)
Winner	(1)	£1,000,000
Runner-up	(1)	£400,000
Semi-finalists	(2)	£200,000
Quarter-finalists	(4)	£100,000
Fourth round losers	(8)	£60,000
Third round losers	(16)	£35,000
Second round losers	(32)	£25,000
First round losers	(64)	£15,000
Nine-dart finish		£60,000

=== Broadcasts ===
The tournament was broadcast by Sky Sports in the United Kingdom and Ireland; the World Championship acted as the first event of the PDC and Sky Sports's new five-year broadcast deal. Other broadcasters included Viaplay in the Netherlands and the Nordic countries; DAZN in Germany, Austria, Switzerland and Italy; Sport1 in Germany; VTM in Belgium; Fox Sports in Australia; Sky Sport in New Zealand; L'Équipe in France; Pragosport in Hungary; Nova Sport in Czechia and Slovakia; Peacock and FanDuel TV Extra in the United States; BeIN Sports in the Middle East and North Africa; Maincast in Ukraine; SPTV and ZonaSport in Croatia; StarHub TV in Singapore; TVP Sport in Poland; Rigour in China; Arena Sport in Serbia, Bosnia and Herzegovina, North Macedonia, Montenegro and Kosovo; TV3 in the Baltic states; Saran in Turkey; and Premier Sports Network in Mongolia.

The tournament was also available on the PDC's streaming service, PDCTV, for subscribers outside of the United Kingdom, Ireland, Germany, Austria and Switzerland. Talksport provided live commentary for the event, which featured former professional players Paul Nicholson and Chris Mason.

== Qualification ==
The 128-player field comprised three sets of qualification routes. The top 40 players on the two-year PDC Order of Merit after the 2025 Players Championship Finals qualified automatically, followed by the next 40 highest-ranked players on the one-year PDC Pro Tour Order of Merit. The remaining 48 places went to various international qualifiers. A record total of 28 players made their PDC World Championship debut.

=== Background ===
==== Order of Merit qualifiers ====
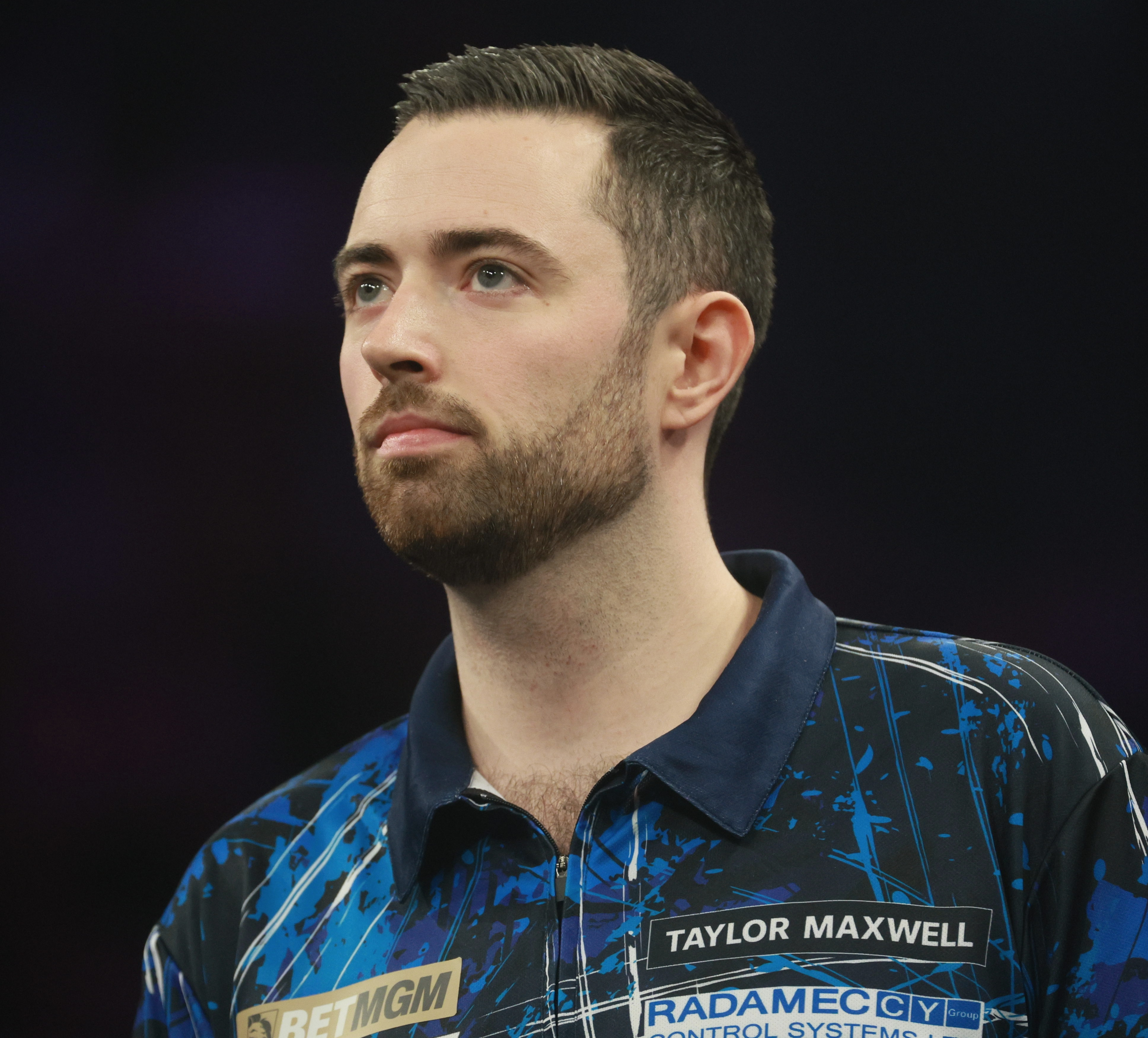
The 2024 world champion Luke Humphries was the number two seed for the event.

There were 40 players who qualified for the tournament by virtue of being ranked in the top 40 of the PDC Order of Merit. Defending champion Luke Littler was the number one seed for the tournament, having achieved world number one status on his way to winning the 2025 Grand Slam. He entered the World Championship off the back of claiming his sixth major title of 2025 at the Players Championship Finals; his other titles included the last World Championship, the World Matchplay and his second Grand Slam. Luke Humphries, the 2024 world champion and previous world number one, was the second seed. He won two major titles, the World Masters and the Premier League, during the season. The third seed was three-time world champion Michael van Gerwen, who ended a two-year major title drought by winning the World Series Finals in September. Four-time World Championship semi-finalist James Wade was seeded seventh in his 22nd appearance at the tournament. Tenth seed Gian van Veen achieved his first major title at the European Championship and retained his World Youth Championship during the year.

Former PDC world champions Gerwyn Price, Gary Anderson, Rob Cross, Michael Smith and Peter Wright were all amongst the seeded players. Josh Rock and Daryl Gurney, who won the World Cup for Northern Ireland, were the 11th and 22nd seeds. Nathan Aspinall, the most prolific player on the 2025 European Tour with three titles, was the 15th seed after finishing as runner-up to Littler at the Players Championship Finals. Jermaine Wattimena, the 19th seed, claimed his first two PDC ranking titles in 2025 Players Championship events. The 2022 Masters champion Joe Cullen secured the 32nd and final seeded position. Outside of the top 32 seeds, eight more players qualified through the PDC Order of Merit and were unseeded in the tournament draw, including five-time world champion Raymond van Barneveld, who made his 33rd World Championship appearance across both the PDC and BDO tournaments.

==== Pro Tour qualifiers ====
There were 40 players who qualified for the tournament as the 40 highest-ranked players on the PDC Pro Tour Order of Merit who had not yet qualified. The list was topped by Niko Springer, who won his first PDC ranking title at the Hungarian Darts Trophy. Other first-time title winners to qualify through the Pro Tour were Bradley Brooks, Jeffrey de Graaf and Sebastian Białecki. Max Hopp, the 2015 World Youth champion, made his first appearance at the World Championship since the 2021 event. Former semi-finalist Gabriel Clemens was joined by former quarter-finalists Callan Rydz, Ian White, Kim Huybrechts and Darius Labanauskas. Development Tour winner Cam Crabtree and Grand Slam quarter-finalist Lukas Wenig were among the players to qualify for their maiden World Championship.

==== International qualifiers ====
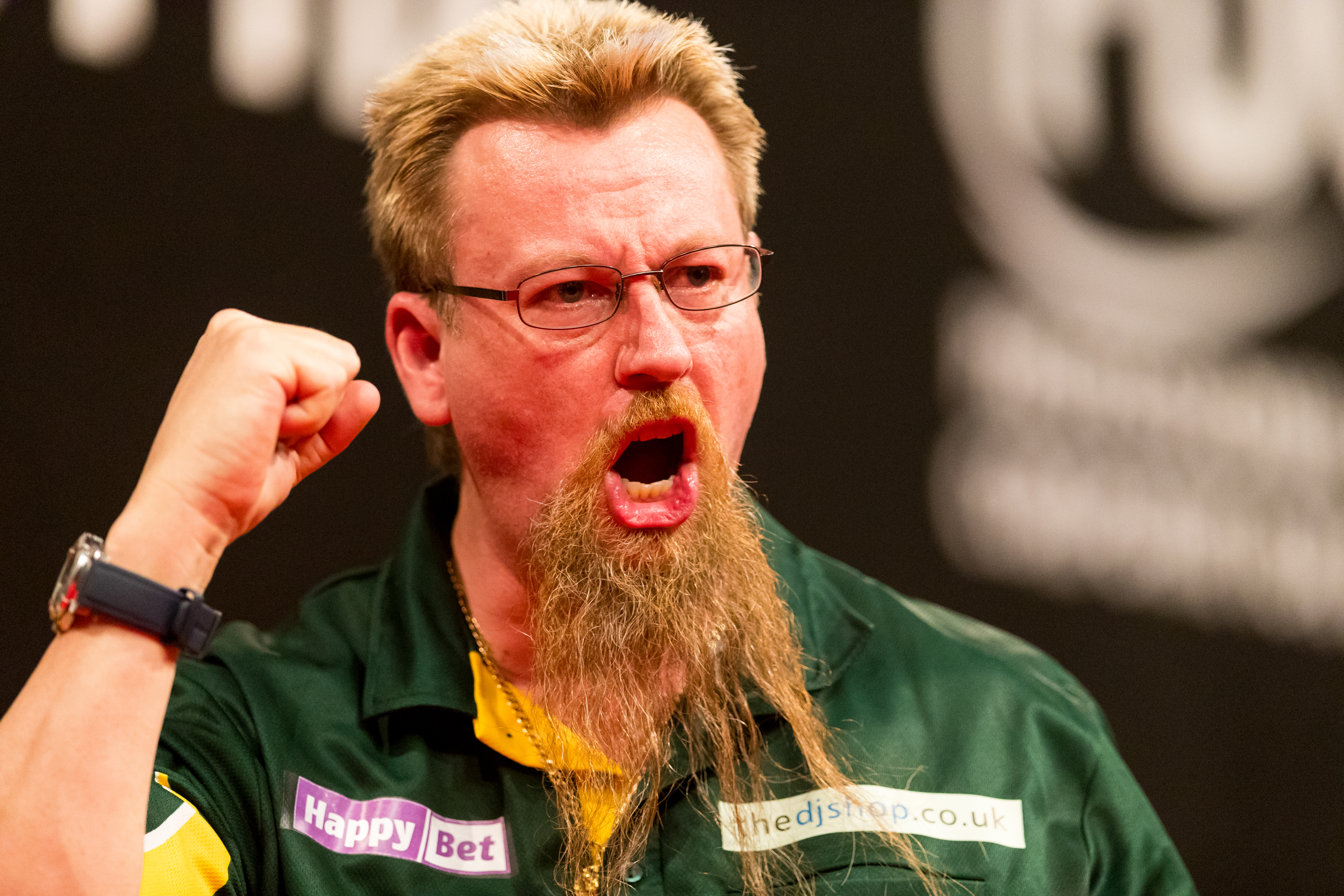
Simon Whitlock, the 2010 World Championship runner-up, secured qualification for the event by winning the 2025 ANZ Premier League.

There were 48 players who qualified for the tournament through international qualifiers. Three-time women's world champion Beau Greaves made her second appearance at the PDC World Championship after her debut at the 2023 event, having declined to participate in the last two editions in favour of competing in the WDF World Championship. A minimum of four women were guaranteed to participate in the tournament as part of the new World Championship qualification structure. Along with Greaves, Women's World Matchplay champion Lisa Ashton and Women's Series players Fallon Sherrock, Noa-Lynn van Leuven and Gemma Hayter qualified. Sherrock entered as the only woman to have won matches at the tournament, while Van Leuven remained the only transgender player in the event's history.

Paul Lim, who finished fifth on the 2025 PDC Asian Tour, qualified for his first PDC World Championship since the 2022 edition; at age 71, he extended his record as the oldest player to compete at the event. Simon Whitlock, who finished as runner-up at the 2010 World Championship, confirmed his comeback by winning the newly-established ANZ Premier League, having missed the last World Championship to end a 15-year participation streak. Whitlock, Tim Pusey and Joe Comito comprised the Australian contingent to qualify, alongside seeded player Damon Heta. Spain's Cristo Reyes secured his return to the World Championship by winning the Mediterranean qualifier, having last competed at the 2020 edition.

Kenya and Argentina were represented for the first time after David Munyua and Jesús Salate earned their places in the tournament. The final five places at the World Championship went to the successful players from the Tour Card holder qualifier: 2020 Grand Slam champion José de Sousa, Tavis Dudeney, Adam Hunt, Stephen Burton and Haupai Puha.

The international qualifiers were invited in the following order:

Originally a qualification route

List of international qualifiers for the 2026 PDC World Darts Championship
Event	Dates	Position	Qualifier
~~PDC World Youth Championship~~	~~23 November~~	~~Winner~~	~~Gian van Veen (NED)~~ (Note: As PDC World Youth Championship winner Gian van Veen qualified via the PDC Order of Merit, an extra place was awarded to the sixth-place finisher on the Development Tour.)
PDC Development Tour	21 February – 12 October	Runner-up	Beau Greaves (ENG)
PDC Development Tour	21 February – 12 October	Fourth place (Note: As Development Tour winner Cam Crabtree and third-place finisher Owen Bates both qualified via the PDC Pro Tour, extra places were awarded to the fourth and fifth-place finishers.)	Charlie Manby (ENG)
PDC Development Tour	21 February – 12 October	Fifth place	Jamai van den Herik (NED)
PDC Development Tour	21 February – 12 October	Sixth place	Jurjen van der Velde (NED)
PDC Challenge Tour	17 January – 26 October	Winner	Stefan Bellmont (SUI)
PDC Challenge Tour	17 January – 26 October	Third place	Ted Evetts (ENG)
PDC Challenge Tour	17 January – 26 October	Fourth place (Note: As Challenge Tour runner-up Darius Labanauskas qualified via the PDC Pro Tour, an extra place was awarded to the fourth-place finisher.)	Mervyn King (ENG)
Women's World Matchplay	27 July	Winner	Lisa Ashton (ENG)
PDC Women's Series	15 February – 19 October	Runner-up	Fallon Sherrock (ENG)
PDC Women's Series	15 February – 19 October	Fourth place (Note: As series winner Beau Greaves and third-place finisher Lisa Ashton qualified via the PDC Development Tour and the Women's World Matchplay respectively, extra places were awarded to the fourth and fifth-place finishers.)	Noa-Lynn van Leuven (NED)
PDC Women's Series	15 February – 19 October	Fifth place	Gemma Hayter (ENG)
PDJ Steel Darts Japan Tour	16 August – 16 November	Winner	Mitsuhiko Tatsunami (JPN)
PDC China Championship	24 August	Winner	Xiaochen Zong (CHN)
IDC Indian Qualifier	3–5 October	Winner	Nitin Kumar (IND)
PDC Asian Championship	13–14 September	Winner	Lourence Ilagan (PHI)
PDC Asian Championship	13–14 September	Runner-up	Alexis Toylo (PHI)
PDC Asian Tour	25 January – 12 September	Runner-up	Motomu Sakai (JPN)
PDC Asian Tour	25 January – 12 September	Fourth place	Ryusei Azemoto (JPN)
PDC Asian Tour	25 January – 12 September	Fifth place	Paul Lim (SGP)
PDC Asian Tour	25 January – 12 September	Sixth place (Note: As tour winner Alexis Toylo and third-place finisher Lourence Ilagan qualified by virtue of reaching the final of the Asian Championship, two places below the original top five qualified for the World Championship.)	Man Lok Leung (HKG)
PDC Asian Tour	25 January – 12 September	Seventh place	Paolo Nebrida (PHI)
PDCE Netherlands & Belgium Qualifier	15 November	Winner	Andy Baetens (BEL)
PDCE Mediterranean Qualifier	16 November	Winner	Cristo Reyes (ESP)
PDCE South-East Europe Qualifier	15 November	Winner	Boris Krčmar (CRO)
PDCE Czechia Qualifier	16 November	Winner	Adam Gawlas (CZE)
PDO Polish Qualifier	14 November	Winner	Krzysztof Kciuk (POL)
PDCE DACH Super League	4–7 November	Winner	Arno Merk (GER)
Hungarian Super League	26 July – 18 October	Winner	Patrik Kovács (HUN)
PDC UK&IRE Tour Card Holder & Associate Member Qualifier	1 November	Winner	David Davies (WAL)
~~PDC North American Championship~~	~~28 June~~	~~Winner~~	~~Matt Campbell (CAN)~~ (Note: Campbell was ineligible to take the World Championship spot via the North American Championship due to PDC Rule 3.9, which states that players who have held a Tour Card for more than two years, or are inside the top 64 in the world, cannot use affiliate qualifiers to qualify for PDC events. The spot was awarded to the top-ranked non-qualified player from the CDC Pro Tour, Stowe Buntz.)
CDC Continental Cup	17–18 October	Winner	Alex Spellman (USA)
CDC Cross-Border Challenge	11–12 April	Winner	Leonard Gates (USA)
CDC Pro Tour	9 May – 21 September	Top-ranked American	Adam Sevada (USA)
CDC Pro Tour	9 May – 21 September	Top-ranked Canadian	David Cameron (CAN)
CDC Pro Tour	9 May – 21 September	Top-ranked non-qualified	Stowe Buntz (USA)
CDLC Tour	26 April – 5 October	Winner	Jesús Salate (ARG)
PDC Nordic & Baltic Championship	3–4 October	Winner	Teemu Harju (FIN)
PDCNB Pro Tour	15 February – 3 August	Winner	Andreas Harrysson (SWE)
PDCNB Pro Tour	15 February – 3 August	Third place (Note: As runner-up Teemu Harju qualified by virtue of winning the Nordic & Baltic Championship, Lukasiak qualified after finishing third.)	Oskar Lukasiak (SWE)
ANZ Premier League	4 October – 22 November	Winner	Simon Whitlock (AUS)
ADA Tour	27 June – 7 September	Winner	Tim Pusey (AUS)
DPA Pro Tour	22 February – 31 August	Winner	Joe Comito (AUS)
DPNZ Pro Tour	15 February – 28 September	Winner	Jonny Tata (NZL)
African Darts Group Qualifier	28 September	Winner	David Munyua (KEN)
PDC Tour Card Holder Qualifier	24 November	1	Tavis Dudeney (ENG)
PDC Tour Card Holder Qualifier	24 November	2	Adam Hunt (ENG)
PDC Tour Card Holder Qualifier	24 November	3	Stephen Burton (ENG)
PDC Tour Card Holder Qualifier	24 November	4	Haupai Puha (NZL)
PDC Tour Card Holder Qualifier	24 November	5	José de Sousa (POR)

=== List of qualifiers ===
The following players qualified for the tournament. Their placement in the tournament is shown in parentheses.

PDC Order of Merit (Top 32 seeded)

1. Luke Littler (ENG) (champion)
2. Luke Humphries (ENG) (quarter-finals)
3. Michael van Gerwen (NED) (fourth round)
4. Stephen Bunting (ENG) (third round)
5. Jonny Clayton (WAL) (quarter-finals)
6. Danny Noppert (NED) (second round)
7. James Wade (ENG) (second round)
8. Chris Dobey (ENG) (second round)
9. Gerwyn Price (WAL) (second round)
10. Gian van Veen (NED) (runner-up)
11. Josh Rock (NIR) (fourth round)
12. Ross Smith (ENG) (first round)
13. Martin Schindler (GER) (third round)
14. Gary Anderson (SCO) (semi-finals)
15. Nathan Aspinall (ENG) (third round)
16. Damon Heta (AUS) (third round)
17. Rob Cross (ENG) (fourth round)
18. Mike De Decker (BEL) (first round)
19. Jermaine Wattimena (NED) (third round)
20. Ryan Searle (ENG) (semi-finals)
21. Dave Chisnall (ENG) (second round)
22. Daryl Gurney (NIR) (second round)
23. Dimitri Van den Bergh (BEL) (first round)
24. Ryan Joyce (ENG) (second round)
25. Luke Woodhouse (ENG) (fourth round)
26. Cameron Menzies (SCO) (first round)
27. Ritchie Edhouse (ENG) (first round)
28. Michael Smith (ENG) (second round)
29. Dirk van Duijvenbode (NED) (second round)
30. Peter Wright (SCO) (second round)
31. Wessel Nijman (NED) (second round)
32. Joe Cullen (ENG) (second round)
33. Ricardo Pietreczko (GER) (third round)
34. Andrew Gilding (ENG) (third round)
35. Raymond van Barneveld (NED) (first round)
36. Scott Williams (ENG) (second round)
37. Krzysztof Ratajski (POL) (quarter-finals)
38. Martin Lukeman (ENG) (first round)
39. Brendan Dolan (NIR) (second round)
40. Ricky Evans (ENG) (third round)

Pro Tour Order of Merit

1. Niko Springer (GER) (first round)
2. William O'Connor (IRL) (second round)
3. Niels Zonneveld (NED) (third round)
4. Kevin Doets (NED) (fourth round)
5. Karel Sedláček (CZE) (first round)
6. Bradley Brooks (ENG) (first round)
7. Jeffrey de Graaf (SWE) (first round)
8. Mickey Mansell (NIR) (first round)
9. Mario Vandenbogaerde (BEL) (first round)
10. Callan Rydz (ENG) (third round)
11. Cam Crabtree (ENG) (first round)
12. Ian White (ENG) (second round)
13. Sebastian Białecki (POL) (first round)
14. Dom Taylor (ENG) (second round, suspended)
15. Richard Veenstra (NED) (first round)
16. Madars Razma (LAT) (third round)
17. Alan Soutar (SCO) (second round)
18. Lukas Wenig (GER) (first round)
19. Kim Huybrechts (BEL) (first round)
20. Mensur Suljović (AUT) (third round)
21. Gabriel Clemens (GER) (third round)
22. Thibault Tricole (FRA) (first round)
23. Matthew Dennant (ENG) (first round)
24. Darren Beveridge (SCO) (second round)
25. Justin Hood (ENG) (quarterfinals)
26. Wesley Plaisier (NED) (third round)
27. Steve Lennon (IRL) (first round)
28. Max Hopp (GER) (second round)
29. Ryan Meikle (ENG) (third round)
30. James Hurrell (ENG) (fourth round)
31. Nick Kenny (WAL) (first round)
32. Matt Campbell (CAN) (first round)
33. Keane Barry (IRL) (second round)
34. Adam Lipscombe (ENG) (first round)
35. Darius Labanauskas (LIT) (first round)
36. Dominik Grüllich (GER) (first round)
37. Chris Landman (NED) (first round)
38. Owen Bates (ENG) (first round)
39. Cor Dekker (NOR) (first round)
40. Connor Scutt (ENG) (second round)

International qualifiers

- Lisa Ashton (ENG) (first round)
- Ryusei Azemoto (JPN) (first round)
- Andy Baetens (BEL) (first round)
- Stefan Bellmont (SUI) (second round)
- Stowe Buntz (USA) (first round)
- Stephen Burton (ENG) (first round)
- David Cameron (CAN) (first round)
- Joe Comito (AUS) (second round)
- David Davies (WAL) (second round)
- Tavis Dudeney (ENG) (first round)
- Ted Evetts (ENG) (first round)
- Leonard Gates (USA) (second round)
- Adam Gawlas (CZE) (first round)
- Beau Greaves (ENG) (first round)
- Teemu Harju (FIN) (first round)
- Andreas Harrysson (SWE) (fourth round)
- Gemma Hayter (ENG) (first round)
- Jamai van den Herik (NED) (first round)
- Adam Hunt (ENG) (first round)
- Lourence Ilagan (PHI) (first round)
- Krzysztof Kciuk (POL) (first round)
- Mervyn King (ENG) (first round)
- Patrik Kovács (HUN) (first round)
- Boris Krčmar (CRO) (first round)
- Nitin Kumar (IND) (second round)
- Man Lok Leung (HKG) (first round)
- Noa-Lynn van Leuven (NED) (first round)
- Paul Lim (SGP) (second round)
- Oskar Lukasiak (SWE) (first round)
- Charlie Manby (ENG) (fourth round)
- Arno Merk (GER) (third round)
- David Munyua (KEN) (second round)
- Paolo Nebrida (PHI) (first round)
- Haupai Puha (NZL) (first round)
- Tim Pusey (AUS) (first round)
- Cristo Reyes (ESP) (first round)
- Motomu Sakai (JPN) (second round)
- Jesús Sálate (ARG) (first round)
- Adam Sevada (USA) (second round)
- Fallon Sherrock (ENG) (first round)
- José de Sousa (POR) (first round)
- Alex Spellman (USA) (first round)
- Jonny Tata (NZL) (second round)
- Mitsuhiko Tatsunami (JPN) (first round)
- Alexis Toylo (PHI) (first round)
- Jurjen van der Velde (NED) (first round)
- Simon Whitlock (AUS) (first round)
- Xiaochen Zong (CHN) (first round)

== Summary ==
=== First round ===
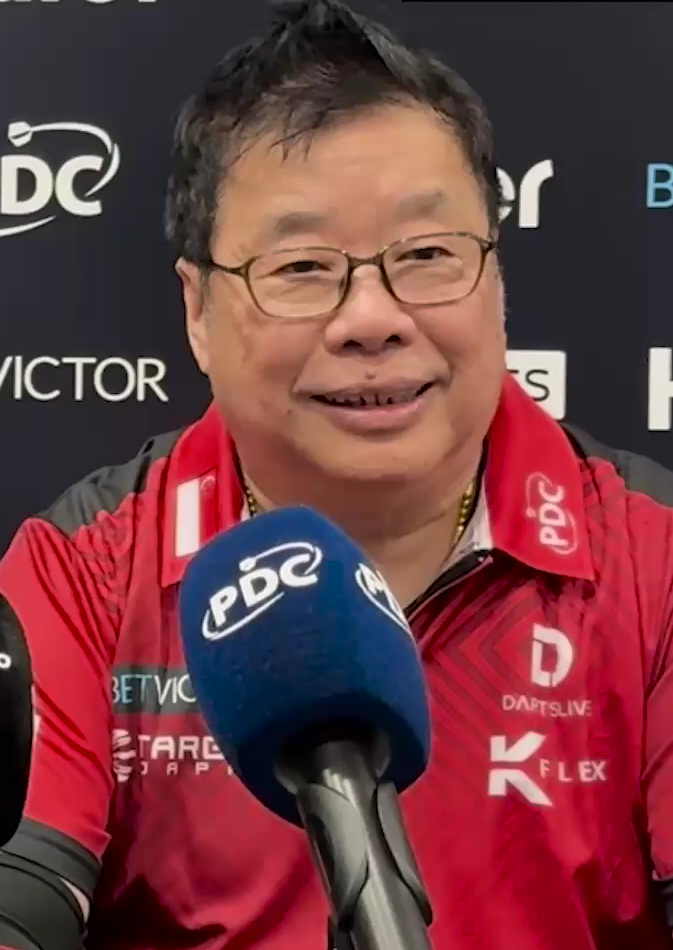
Paul Lim (pictured in 2026) became the oldest player to win a PDC World Championship match at 71 years old, in a 3–1 victory over Jeffrey de Graaf.

The first round (best of five sets) took place from 11 to 19 December. Luke Littler opened his title defence with a 3–0 victory over Darius Labanauskas. The first two sets of the match were played to deciding legs, which Littler won, before also claiming the third set. Littler admitted to being nervous for his opening match, which he called "the hardest game" of the tournament to play. Michael Smith, the 2023 world champion, defeated Lisa Ashton 3–0 in what he deemed "not a great game". After a year of dealing with injuries, Smith said: "That is the first time I felt 100 per cent this year, but I didn't play 100 per cent. It's hard coming the first night, I am glad to be through." German debutant Arno Merk won the opening match of the tournament by beating Kim Huybrechts 3–1, while Madars Razma closed the opening day by defeating Dutch debutant Jamai van den Herik by the same scoreline. Rob Cross, the 2018 world champion, hit a 170 checkout in the final leg of his 3–0 win against Cor Dekker. In his third World Championship appearance, Gian van Veen, the reigning European champion, earned his first win at the tournament by defeating Cristo Reyes 3–1. Twelfth seed Ross Smith was the first seeded player to be eliminated, losing 3–2 to Swedish debutant Andreas Harrysson. Smith missed six match darts in the fourth set to win 3–1, allowing Harrysson to level the score and win the deciding set.

Luke Humphries, the 2024 world champion, won his opening match 3–1 against Ted Evetts. Already the oldest player to compete at the event, 71-year-old Paul Lim became the oldest player to win a PDC World Championship match by defeating Jeffrey de Graaf 3–1; he beat the previous record held by John MaGowan, who was 67 when he won a match at the 2009 World Championship. Humphries and Lim's wins set up a match between the pair in the second round—a rematch of their 2021 World Championship meeting, which Lim won 3–2. Lim praised Humphries's ability in his post-match interview but claimed that he "can be beaten", while Humphries recounted his friendly interactions with Lim since their match, adding: "The crowd will be against me and if I don't play well, he will fancy his chances." World number 84 Adam Hunt took a 2–1 lead against two-time world champion Gary Anderson, but Anderson claimed the next two sets to win 3–2. "That's probably the best Adam [Hunt] has played all season," said Anderson afterwards. Gabriel Clemens converted a 170 checkout in the second leg of his match against Alex Spellman and went on to win 3–0, only conceding one leg throughout the contest.

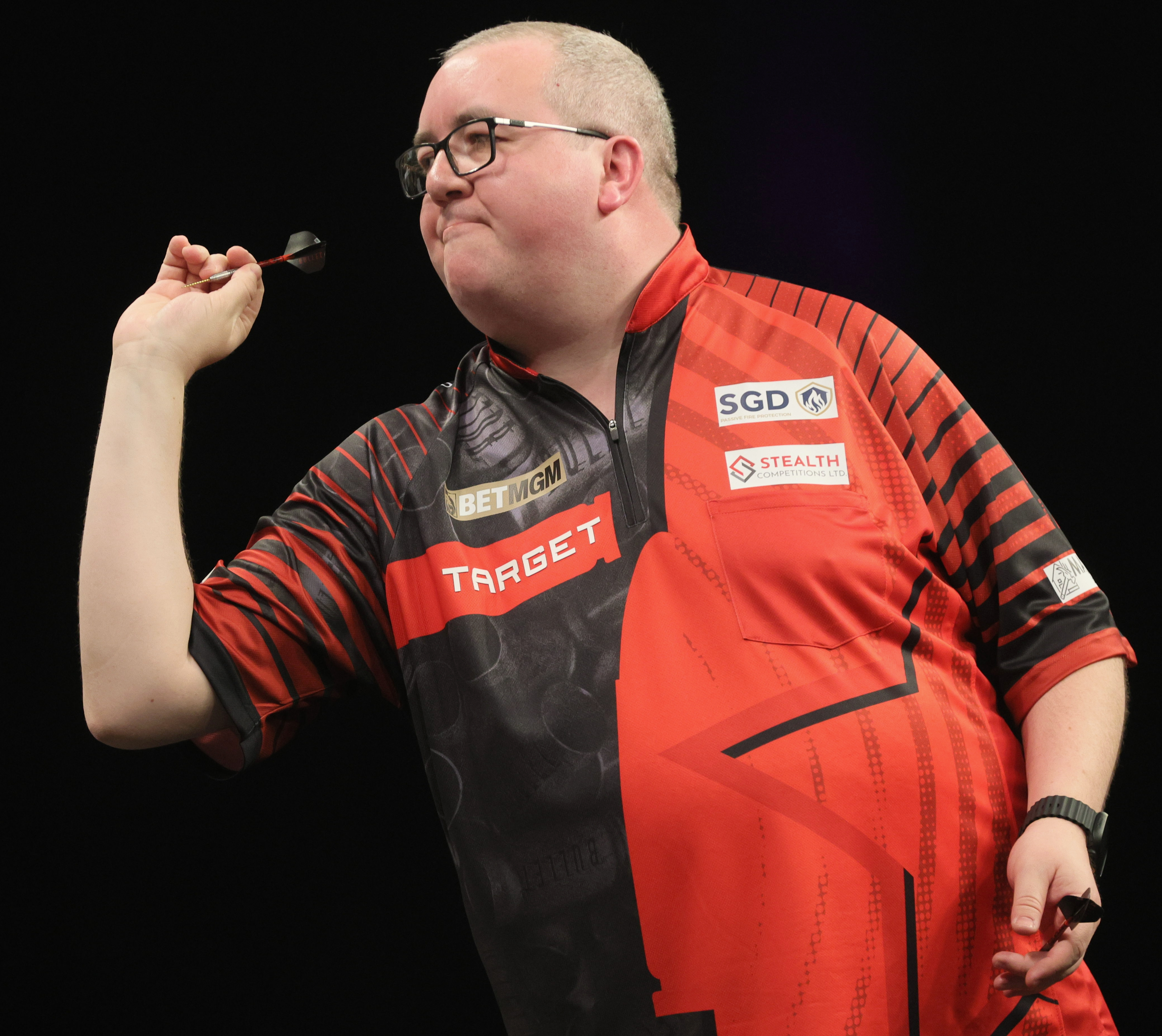
Fourth seed Stephen Bunting (pictured in 2025) defeated Sebastian Białecki 3–2 in the first match of the tournament to enter a tie-break.

Fourth seed Stephen Bunting established a two-set lead over Sebastian Białecki, who then won six of the next seven legs to bring the score to 2–2. With the deciding set level at 2–2 in legs, Bunting and Białecki were the first pair of the tournament to enter a tie-break, where Bunting earned the two clear legs required to win the set 4–2 and the match 3–2. Dimitri Van den Bergh, a semi-finalist at the 2023 World Championship, missed 16 out of 17 attempts at double as he lost 3–0 to Scottish debutant Darren Beveridge. Competing in his fifth PDC World Championship, Nitin Kumar became the first Indian player to win a match at the event, beating Richard Veenstra 3–2. Kumar, who hit 75 per cent of his darts at double, said he was "willing to be the puppet" for inspired Indian players, while Sky Sports commentator Glen Durrant called the match "one of the greatest games [he had] ever commentated on". The 2024 European Championship winner Ritchie Edhouse lost 3–0 to Jonny Tata, who was the first player from New Zealand to win at the event since the 2019 World Championship.

Fifth seed Jonny Clayton progressed to the second round by beating Adam Lipscombe 3–1. Number 26 seed Cameron Menzies led 2–1 against 20-year-old English debutant Charlie Manby, but Manby came back to claim a 3–2 victory. As Manby celebrated, Menzies began punching the underside of a drinks table on stage out of frustration, cutting his right hand open in the process. He was subsequently taken to hospital. Menzies later apologised for his behaviour, revealing that his uncle had recently died but that it was "no excuse for what [he] did on the stage". In a statement, PDC chief executive Matt Porter said: "Any incident of this nature is reported to the Darts Regulation Authority for review, but our main priority is the player's health and wellbeing." Two-time world champion Peter Wright defeated Noa-Lynn van Leuven 3–0 but admitted he was unhappy with how he played, believing he was "not transferring [his practice] on the big stage". The 2010 World Championship runner-up Simon Whitlock forced a deciding set against Connor Scutt after initially going 2–0 down; Whitlock took the first leg of the set before Scutt took the next three for a 3–2 win. Dirk van Duijvenbode and Andy Baetens also went to a deciding set, where Van Duijvenbode hit a 170 checkout in the first leg and went on to win the set and the match. Max Hopp marked his return to the World Championship after five years by defeating Martin Lukeman 3–1. Brendan Dolan won the second set of his match against Tavis Dudeney with a 170 checkout before clinching a 3–1 victory.

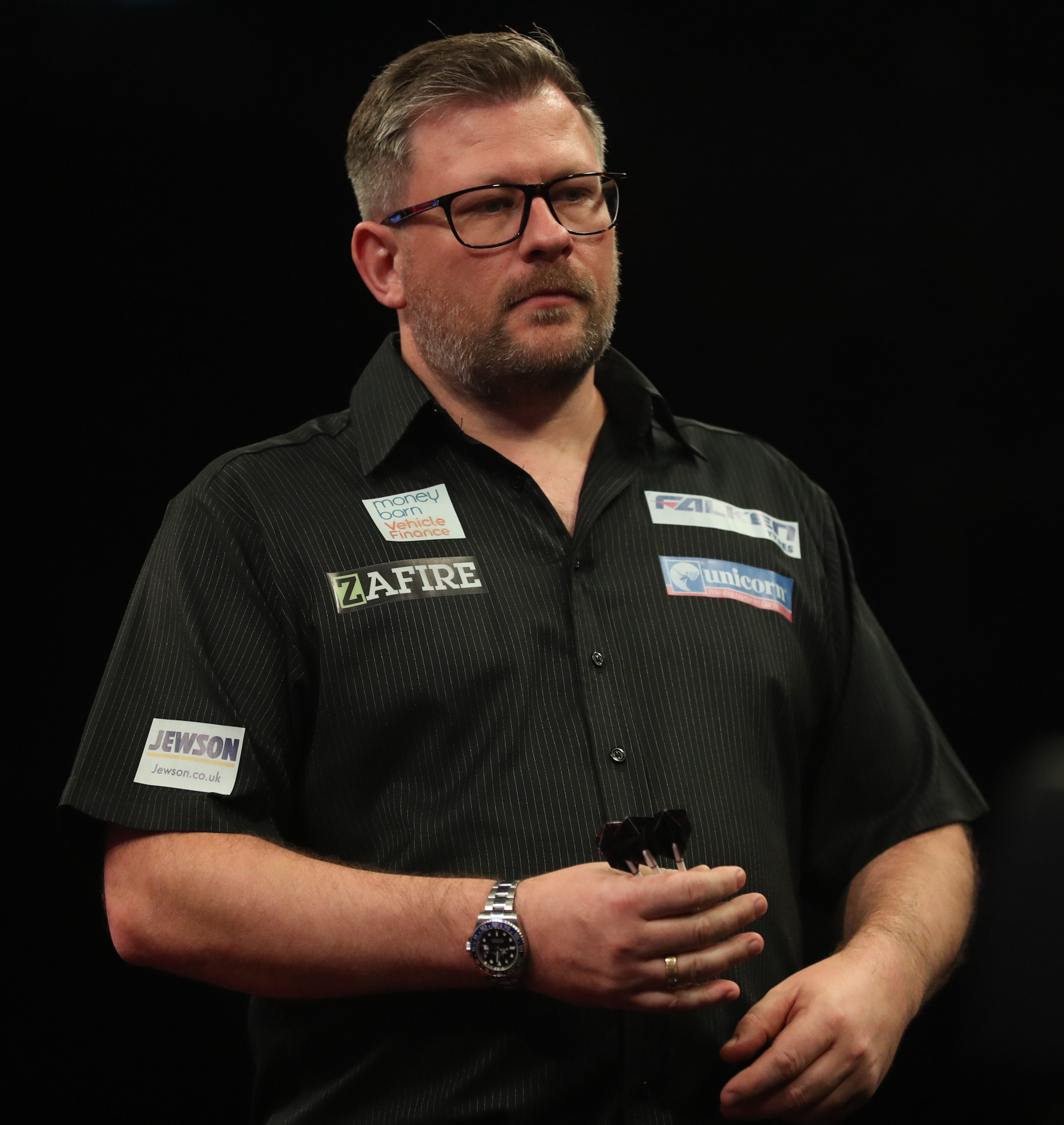
Four-time semi-finalist James Wade (pictured in 2022) achieved his first win at the tournament since the 2022 World Championship by defeating Ryusei Azemoto 3–0.

Gerwyn Price, the 2021 world champion, began his campaign by defeating Adam Gawlas 3–0. Price thanked the crowd for cheering him on and said that he "[doesn't] usually get this [crowd support]". Sky Sports pundit Wayne Mardle stated that Price's scoring during the match was "outrageous" and that he looked like "a million dollars". Following losses in his opening match at the previous two World Championships, sixth seed Danny Noppert was a 3–1 winner over Dutch compatriot Jurjen van der Velde. Chris Dobey defeated Xiaochen Zong by the same scoreline. Australia's Joe Comito earned an 3–1 upset victory against Niko Springer. Alan Soutar and Teemu Harju missed a total of 19 match darts—15 from Soutar and 4 from Harju—on their way to the first sudden death leg of the tournament, where Soutar hit double 16 to prevail. The 2020 Grand Slam champion José de Sousa officially lost his PDC Tour Card following his 3–1 loss to Ricardo Pietreczko. Seventh seed James Wade achieved his first win at the tournament since the 2022 World Championship, defeating Ryusei Azemoto 3–0. Raymond van Barneveld, the 2007 world champion and four-time BDO World Championship winner, lost 3–0 to Stefan Bellmont, who become the first Swiss player to win a match in the event's history.

Three-time world champion Michael van Gerwen lost the opening set of his match against Japanese debutant Mitsuhiko Tatsunami, but won the next three to claim a 3–1 victory. "It was really difficult, I don't know what happened," commented Van Gerwen, who remarked that Tatsunami made him "work really hard" for the win. African qualifier David Munyua, the first Kenyan representative in PDC World Championship history, earned a shock victory against the 2024 World Grand Prix champion and 18th seed Mike De Decker. After winning the first two sets, De Decker missed three match darts to win 3–1 and Munyua capitalised by levelling the score at 2–2. In the deciding set, Munyua landed a 135 checkout before completing a 3–2 comeback win. Japanese debutant Motomu Sakai defeated Thibault Tricole 3–0 in another upset win. Sky Sports pundit Mark Webster said that the debuting players had "done themselves more than justice" with their performances, stating that Munyua's victory was "what the World Championship is about". Fallon Sherrock, the first woman to win a PDC World Championship match, lost 3–0 to Dave Chisnall. Dominik Grüllich led 2–1 against the 19th seed Jermaine Wattimena, but Wattimena overturned the deficit to win 3–2. Krzysztof Ratajski converted a 170 checkout on his way to beating Alexis Toylo 3–0.

Making her second PDC World Championship appearance, Beau Greaves went to a deciding set with 22nd seed Daryl Gurney. Gurney converted a 144 checkout in the third leg of the set before winning the next leg to seal a 3–2 victory, despite Greaves winning more legs throughout the match. Gurney praised Greaves after the match and called her "the best woman darts player on the planet". He also predicted that she was "going to be a force to be reckoned with" and that she would "win some PDC tournaments" in 2026. Nathan Aspinall won 3–1 against Lourence Ilagan after losing the opening set, completing the victory with a 170 checkout. Gemma Hayter clinched a set against 11th seed Josh Rock before losing 3–1. Rock admitted to underestimating Hayter, later declaring: "When it comes to round two against Joe Comito, I will not perform like that, I assure you." William O'Connor produced the highest three-dart average of the first round as he averaged 102.36 to defeat Krzysztof Kciuk 3–0. Keane Barry was the last player to advance, beating Tim Pusey 3–0 in the final match of the round.

=== Second round ===
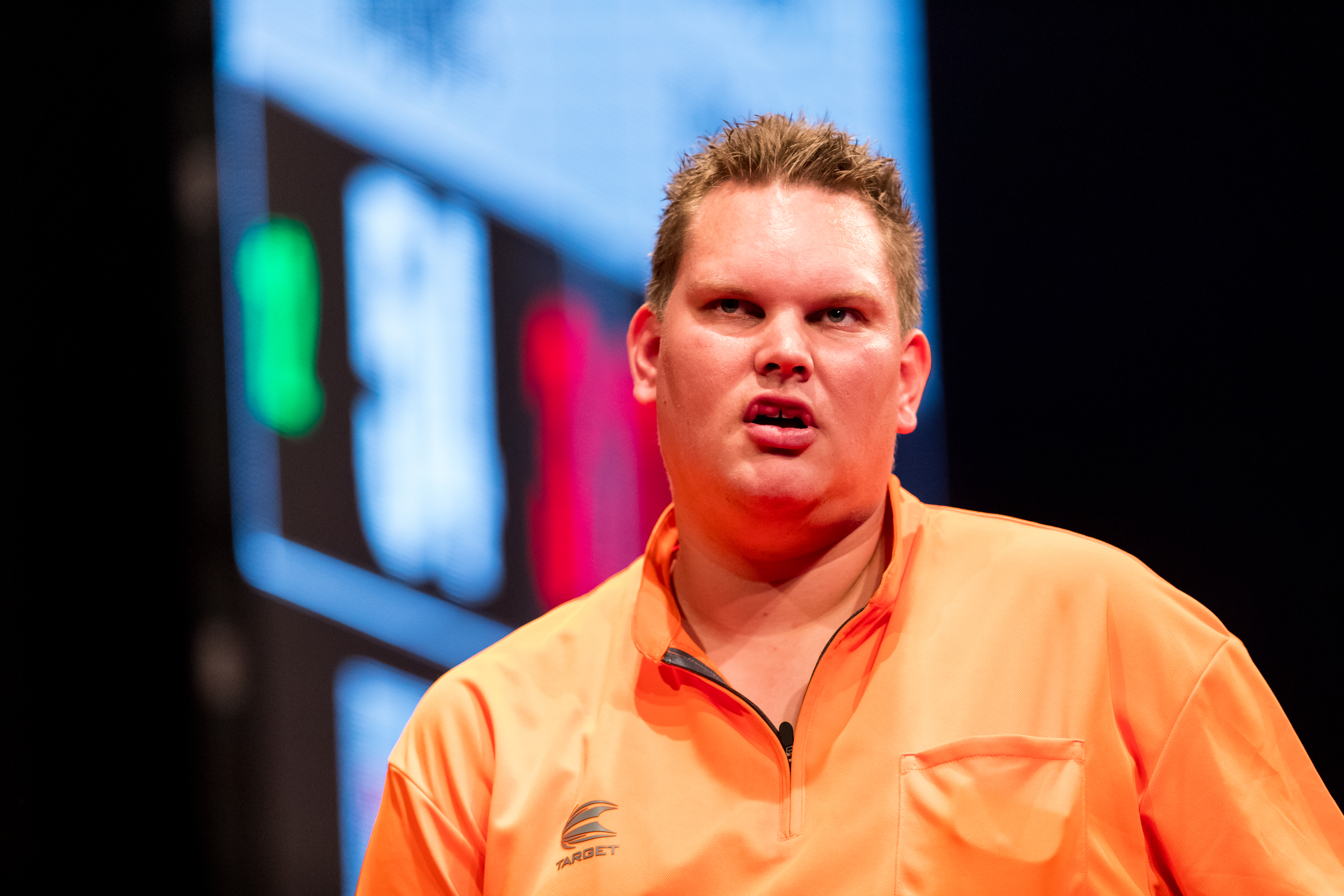
Wesley Plaisier (pictured in 2019) eliminated the 2021 world champion Gerwyn Price in the second round.

The second round (best of five sets) took place from 20 to 23 December and was the final round before the Christmas break. Before the start of the second round, Dom Taylor was suspended by the Darts Regulation Authority (DRA) after failing a drug test, which was conducted on the same day he won his first-round match 3–0 against Oskar Lukasiak. He was removed from the tournament and his scheduled opponent, Jonny Clayton, received a bye to the third round. Four of the six seeded players that competed on 20 December were eliminated. The 28th seed Michael Smith was beaten 3–1 by Niels Zonneveld, who said "I think this is the biggest victory of my life" in response to defeating the former world champion. Andrew Gilding won 3–1 against eighth seed Chris Dobey, marking the first time Dobey had failed to reach the third round since 2018. The 21st seed Dave Chisnall hit 11 maximums as he recovered from 2–0 down against Ricardo Pietreczko, but missed a match dart before Pietreczko secured victory in a tie-break. James Hurrell also won in a deciding set, earning a 3–2 upset win over 29th seed Dirk van Duijvenbode. Seeded players Stephen Bunting and Ryan Searle were 3–0 winners over Nitin Kumar and Brendan Dolan, respectively. Andreas Harrysson continued his debut campaign by defeating Motomu Sakai 3–0.

Welsh debutant David Davies missed darts at double to win the opening set of his match with Luke Littler; Littler later claimed a 3–0 victory. On his opponent's missed doubles, Littler said: "If he hit them, it was a complete different game, but I'm glad he missed." Ninth seed Gerwyn Price suffered a shock 3–0 loss to world number 92 Wesley Plaisier. Plaisier stated that it was "by far [his] biggest win ever" and that he "couldn't imagine beating" Price. Mensur Suljović went 1–0 down against 32nd seed Joe Cullen, who hit a 170 checkout, but Suljović won the next three sets for a 3–1 victory. Cullen was visibly unhappy with his opponent's slow style of play during the match and believed it was intentional, posting on social media: "The old guard will say it's part of the game but word it how you will – it's cheating. That's not darts." Suljović denied accusations of cheating, claiming he "never, ever [plays slowly] as a provocation". His win set up a third-round tie against Littler, who revealed that Suljović sent him a message when the tournament draw was conducted that said "See you in round three". Martin Schindler defeated Keane Barry 3–0 in a match where all sets went to a deciding leg. Stefan Bellmont led 1–0 and 2–1 against Damon Heta but Heta ultimately won 3–2. Rob Cross defeated Ian White 3–1, Luke Woodhouse beat Max Hopp 3–0, and Krzysztof Ratajski eliminated 24th seed Ryan Joyce with a 3–1 win.

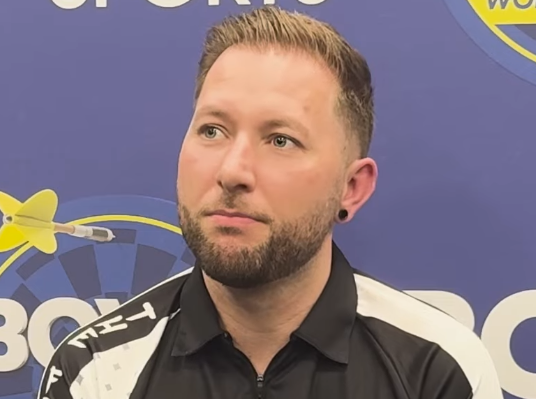
Sixth seed Danny Noppert (pictured in 2025) recovered from 2–0 down to take Justin Hood to a deciding set, which he lost in a sudden-death leg.

Luke Humphries won the first eight legs against Paul Lim. Lim clinched his sole leg of the match before Humphries sealed a 3–0 win. Humphries professed that he did not want to "destroy" Lim 9–0 in legs and he was happy to see Lim avoid a full whitewash defeat. Alan Soutar missed a dart to go 2–0 ahead against Gian van Veen, who hit a 170 checkout on his way to winning 3–1 with a three-dart average of 108.28. Nathan Aspinall defeated Leonard Gates 3–0 in a rematch of their meeting the previous year. Ricky Evans reached the third round for the third consecutive year by beating seventh seed James Wade 3–2. Wade converted a 170 checkout but fell 2–1 behind to Evans, before a successful fourth set from Wade saw the match go to a deciding set. Evans missed seven match darts and Wade missed one as the pair went to a tie-break, where Evans won the set 6–4 in legs with a 99 checkout. "My sister hit that double for me there" said Evans, whose sister died in March 2025. Kevin Doets defeated David Munyua 3–0 to end the Kenyan's run, while Charlie Manby beat fellow debutant Adam Sevada by the same scoreline. Gabriel Clemens earned a 3–0 victory against 31st seed Wessel Nijman and Madars Razma defeated Darren Beveridge 3–1.

Michael van Gerwen rebounded from his first-round performance by defeating William O'Connor 3–1. Danny Noppert trailed English debutant and world number 86 Justin Hood 2–0, but won the next two sets after Hood missed the bullseye for a 3–0 victory. In the deciding set, Noppert missed a match dart but landed checkouts of 157 and 127 as the pair entered a sudden-death leg, which Hood won with a 78 finish. The match, in which both players averaged over 102, was noted for its high quality and dramatic play. Gary Anderson registered a three-dart average of 105.41 and hit nine maximums in his 3–1 victory over Connor Scutt. Arno Merk advanced to the third round with a 3–0 win against Peter Wright, who only averaged 79.20. When asked about Wright's defeat, Van Gerwen commented that he was not surprised and believed it was "time for [Wright] to retire anyway", while Anderson said his fellow Scottish world champion needed to be given "a bit of time". Two-time quarter-finalist Callan Rydz converted two 167 checkouts on his way to defeating Daryl Gurney 3–2 in a tie-break. Ryan Meikle became the second player of the tournament to overturn a two-set deficit as he completed a 3–2 comeback victory against Jonny Tata; 2024 semi-finalist Scott Williams attempted the same feat but lost in a deciding set to Jermaine Wattimena. The final match of the second round saw Josh Rock defeat Joe Comito 3–0. By the end of the second round, 17 of the 32 seeds had been eliminated from the tournament.

=== Third round ===
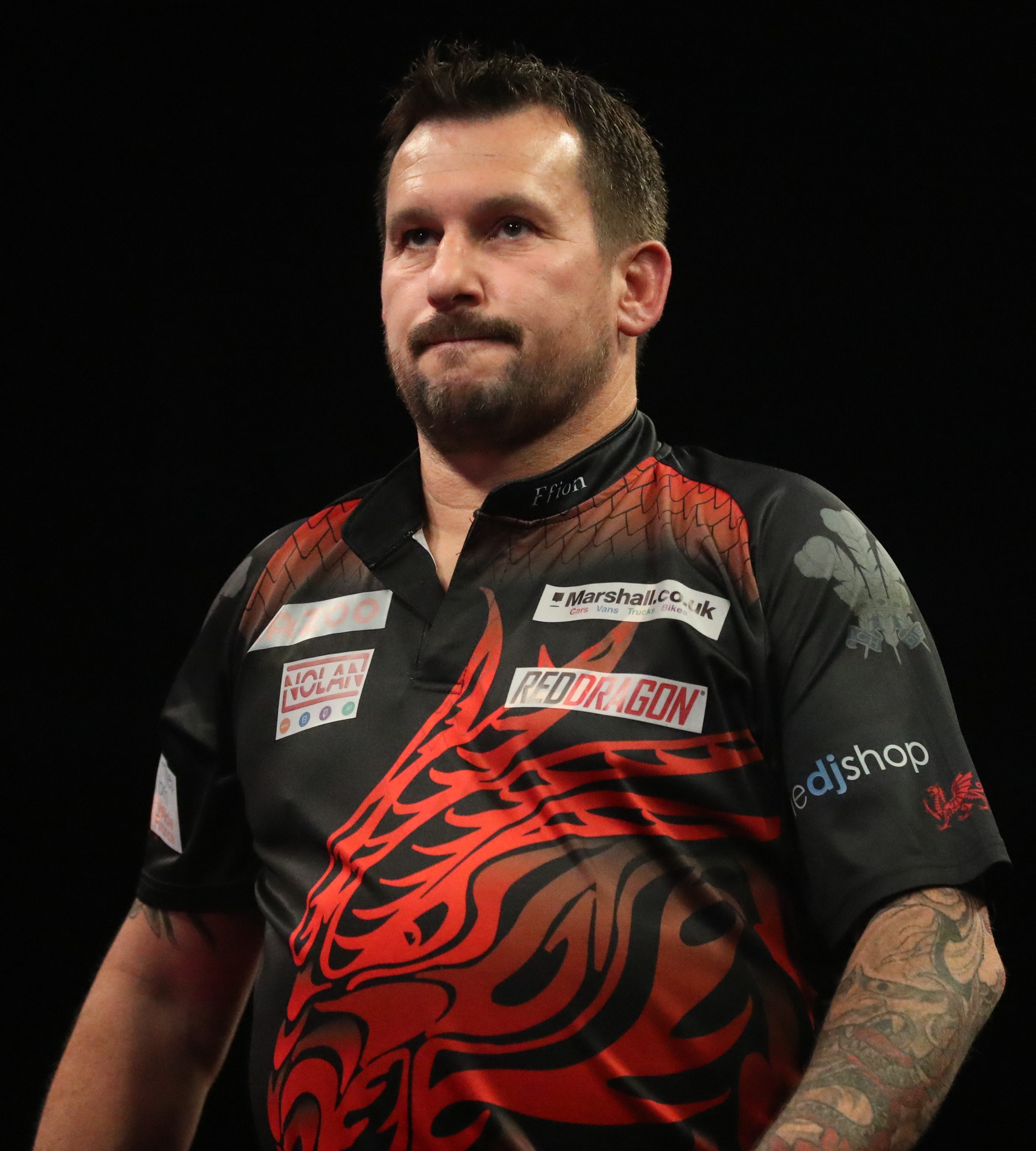
Following the removal of Dom Taylor from the tournament, Jonny Clayton (pictured in 2022) received a bye to the third round, where he defeated Niels Zonneveld 4–3.

The third round (best of seven sets) took place from 27 to 29 December. Luke Littler dropped three legs as he defeated Mensur Suljović 4–0, not allowing Suljović to have a dart at double in the first seven legs of the match. Littler recorded a three-dart average of 107.09 and converted 71 per cent of his double attempts. Speaking after the match, he said that he was settled and believed it was the best he had felt at the World Championship. James Hurrell produced another upset victory by beating fourth seed Stephen Bunting 4–3, defying checkouts of 161 and 121 in deciding legs from Bunting to win the match in a decider. Hurrell called it "the biggest win of [his] career", later saying "I've just beaten the number four in the world. I'm not bothered who I face next" when asked about his potential fourth-round opponents. After a 12-day break, Jonny Clayton prevailed in a deciding set against Niels Zonneveld to advance to the last 16 stage for a fifth successive year. Krzysztof Ratajski recovered from 3–1 down to complete a 4–3 comeback victory over Wesley Plaisier, who missed three match darts in the sixth set. Luke Woodhouse defeated Andrew Gilding 4–1 to reach the fourth round for the second straight year, while Andreas Harrysson beat Ricardo Pietreczko 4–2.

After losing the first three sets of his match against Luke Humphries, Gabriel Clemens found his way back into the tie by winning the fourth and fifth sets, despite a 170 checkout from Humphries during the latter. Clemens had the opportunity to take the match to a deciding set but squandered three darts at double. Humphries halted his opponent's comeback with an 81 checkout on double 13 to win 4–2. Despite the defeat, Clemens became the first German player to average over 100 at the World Championship. Humphries expressed his surprise at his opponent's "onslaught", calling him "the better player in the last three sets". Gary Anderson missed four match darts as he was brought to a deciding set by Jermaine Wattimena. Moving into a tie-break scenario, Anderson attempted a nine-dart finish in the seventh leg but missed the final dart needed at double 12, before winning the set 5–3 in legs for a 4–3 victory—the same scoreline as the pair's third-round meeting at the 2019 World Championship. Anderson joked that he was "getting palpitations, never mind flashbacks" and claimed he "bottled" his shot at the nine-dart finish. Anderson's win set up a fourth-round tie against Michael van Gerwen, who defeated Arno Merk 4–1. Gian van Veen advanced to the next round with a 4–1 win against Madars Razma. Ryan Searle failed to lose a set for the third match in a row as he defeated Martin Schindler 4–0, while Rob Cross beat Damon Heta by the same scoreline to set up a meeting with Luke Littler.

Callan Rydz won the opening set against Josh Rock before Rock claimed four consecutive sets to win 4–1. After the match, Rock offered his condolences to Rydz and his family following the death of his grandfather. Nathan Aspinall, the 15th seed, landed his second 170 checkout of the tournament to take a 3–2 lead against Kevin Doets, but Doets responded by winning the last six legs of the match for a 4–3 victory—his sixth straight win against Aspinall. Charlie Manby and Justin Hood continued their respective debut campaigns, with Manby defeating Ricky Evans 4–2—Evans's seventh loss in the round of 32—and Hood beating Ryan Meikle 4–1. "It's crazy to be in the last 16" stated Manby, who progressed to a fourth-round tie against "good mate" Van Veen.

=== Fourth round ===
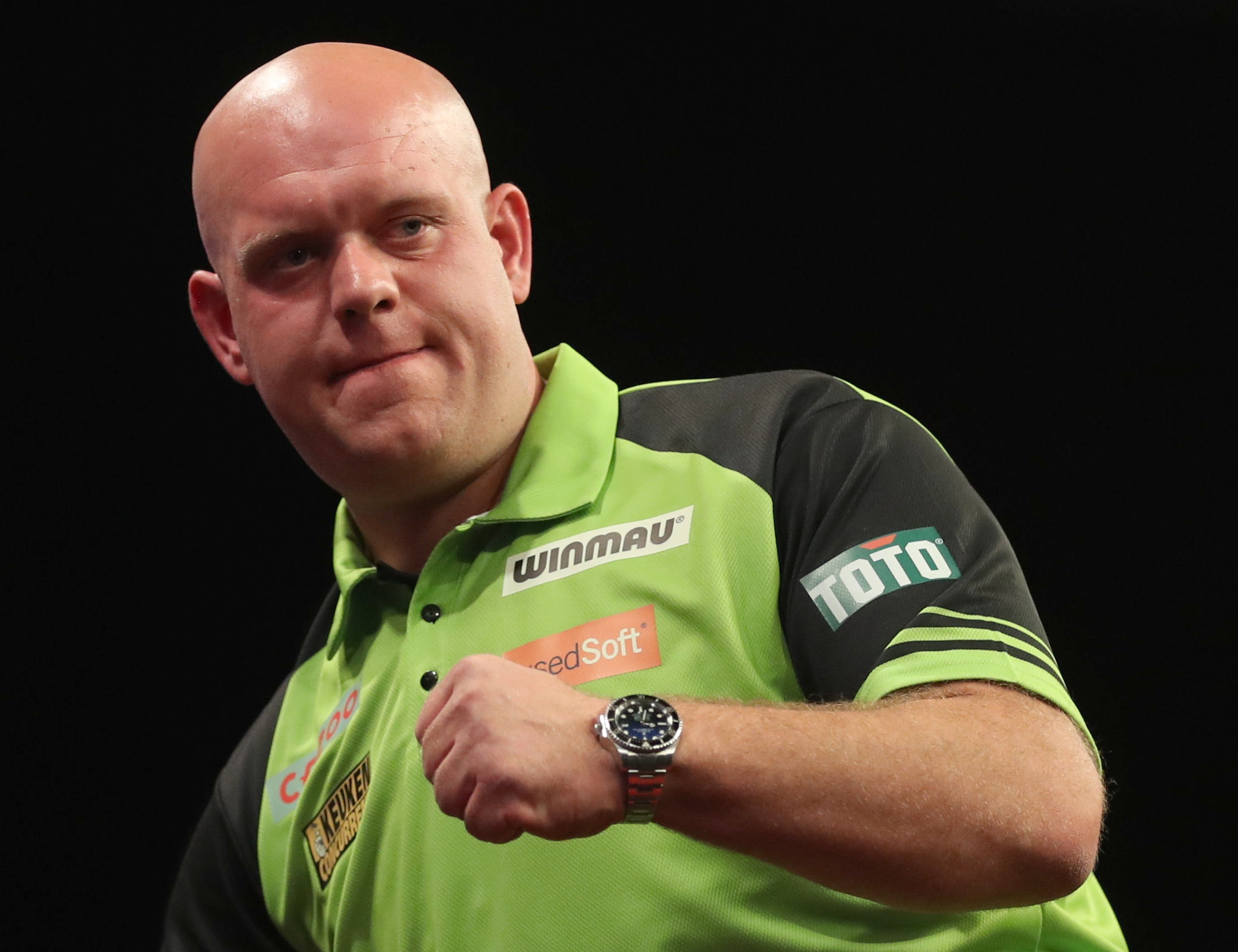
For the first time since the 2016 World Championship, three-time champion Michael van Gerwen (pictured in 2022) was beaten before the quarter-finals, losing 4–1 to Gary Anderson.

The fourth round (best of seven sets) took place from 29 to 30 December. Luke Littler established a 3–1 lead against Rob Cross, averaging 125.25 in the third set of the match. Cross reduced the deficit to 3–2 through a 126 checkout on the bullseye. He led the sixth set but missed a dart to level the match at 3–3, allowing Littler to take the next two legs to win 4–2. Littler, who ended the match with a three-dart average of 106.58 and 17 maximums, laughed off boos from the crowd that occurred during and after the match, saying: "You guys pay for tickets and you pay for my prize money so thank you for my money, thank you for booing me." Ryan Searle defeated James Hurrell 4–0 to continue his streak of matches without dropping a set, having only lost 11 legs in his first four matches. Searle downplayed his performance, claiming he "just threw a few darts and managed to win".

Justin Hood hit 11 consecutive doubles, a PDC record, during his match against Josh Rock, only missing his first dart at double when he attempted a 143 checkout to win the match. He defeated Rock 4–0 by converting a 119 finish, ending the contest with 12 successful doubles out of 16 attempts. Hood admitted that he only felt nervous when throwing to win the match. In response to having his name chanted by the crowd, he said: "To have people chanting your name like that and being on your side like that is an amazing feeling. Long may it continue." Andreas Harrysson was level at 2–2 with Jonny Clayton when he claimed the first two legs of the fifth set, requiring a third to lead 3–2. However, he missed a total of seven darts to win the set, allowing Clayton to capitalise and take the lead before eventually winning the match 4–2. Clayton, who provisionally rose to world number four on the PDC Order of Merit, commented: "What a player Andreas [Harrysson] is – he's such a nice guy and he pushed me all the way, but I've got a smile on my face." Luke Woodhouse became the second player of the tournament to miss double 12 for a nine-dart finish, doing so in the third set of his match with Krzysztof Ratajski. Ratajski went on to beat Woodhouse 4–2 to set up a quarter-final tie against Littler, acknowledging the challenge ahead of him by stating: "[Luke Littler is] the best player in the world, he's the world champion, but in sport, anything is possible."

In a rematch of the 2017 World Championship final, Michael van Gerwen faced Gary Anderson in the pair's 77th meeting. Anderson won the first two sets of the match in deciding legs, dropping the third set as Van Gerwen brought the score back to 2–1. From there, Anderson won six of the next eight legs to seal a 4–1 win. Van Gerwen's defeat marked the first time he had been eliminated from the World Championship before the quarter-finals since 2016. (Note: Van Gerwen withdrew from the 2022 World Championship ahead of the third round after testing positive for COVID-19.) Anderson exclaimed that he and Van Gerwen were "rotten", stemming from the pair missing a number of doubles during the match. Luke Humphries conceded two breaks of throw in the opening set of his match with Kevin Doets, who took a 1–0 lead. Humphries won 12 of the next 14 legs, including the last eight consecutively, to claim a 4–1 victory. "It was a decent performance" said Humphries, who believed there was "another level" in him that he needed to win the championship. Gian van Veen and Charlie Manby traded the first two sets of their match. Momentum shifted in Van Veen's favour when he won the third set 3–0, landing a 132 checkout on the bullseye in the final leg. He produced another bullseye finish, an 88 checkout, to win the fourth set before completing a 4–1 win. On facing Humphries in the quarter-finals, Van Veen recognised his past wins against Humphries as a "confidence boost" before adding: "Playing in a World Championship quarter-final is a different animal and I am going to be ready for that game."

=== Quarter-finals ===
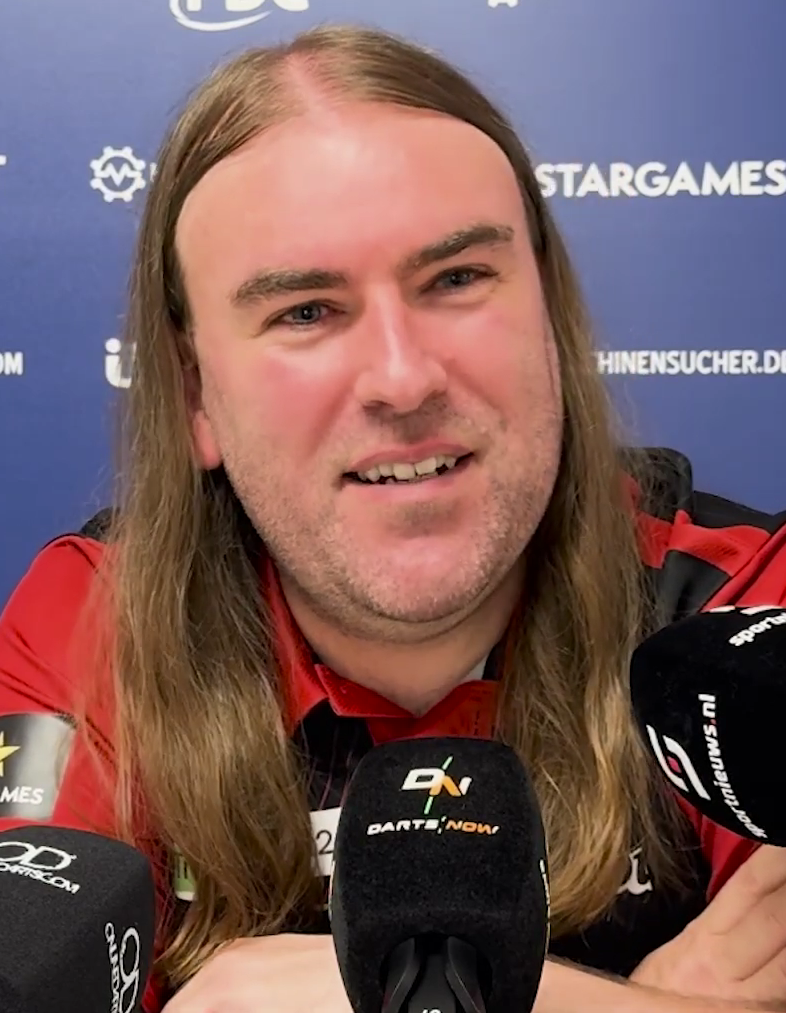
Ryan Searle (pictured in 2025) reached the quarter-finals without losing a set in his first four matches.

The quarter-finals (best of nine sets) took place on New Year's Day (1 January 2026). Competing in his first World Championship quarter-final, Ryan Searle extended his streak of consecutive sets won to 17 as he took a 3–0 lead against Jonny Clayton. Although Clayton won the fourth set of the match to end this run, Searle captured the fifth set with a 111 checkout before completing a 5–2 victory. Clayton missed 30 of his 40 shots at double, in contrast to Searle pinning 17 of 30 attempts. Speaking after the match, Searle discussed his genetic eye condition, dominant optic atrophy, and said: "Other people who try to play darts, if they can't see particularly well, try not to let that hold you back." In the afternoon session's other quarter-final, Gary Anderson and Justin Hood traded the first four sets, with Anderson taking the first and third while Hood took the second and fourth. Anderson proceeded to claim nine of the next ten legs to defeat Hood 5–2. Anderson previewed the semi-finals by stating: "I don't think it makes any difference who you play now; they're all talented players, so we'll see what happens."

Luke Littler faced Krzysztof Ratajski in the first quarter-final of the evening session. Despite receiving boos before walking to the stage, Littler was soon given a positive response from the crowd, who began chanting "there's only one Luke Littler". The first set went to a deciding leg, which Littler won with a 170 checkout. He won the first three sets and survived missed darts at double from Ratajski to claim the fourth in another deciding leg, also taking the fifth for a 5–0 win. "The crowd were very good tonight – it's a new year so obviously there must be some new fans" joked Littler, who believed more pressure from Ratajski would have "set [him] up even better" for the semi-finals. In the final quarter-final match, Luke Humphries faced Gian van Veen. Van Veen produced checkouts of 120 and 124 as he won the first set, with Humphries claiming the next to level at 1–1. Van Veen capitalised on mishaps from Humphries to claim the third set in a deciding leg, before converting a 170 checkout on his way to leading 3–1. He claimed another set in a deciding leg before completing a 5–1 victory, his fifth consecutive win against Humphries. Van Veen, who averaged 105.41 and hit 11 maximums, provisionally rose to world number three and ensured that he would become the new Dutch number one by surpassing Michael van Gerwen, who held the position since 2013. Van Veen remarked that the victory was "probably" the biggest win of his career, overtaking his victory over Humphries in the 2025 European Championship final.

=== Semi-finals ===
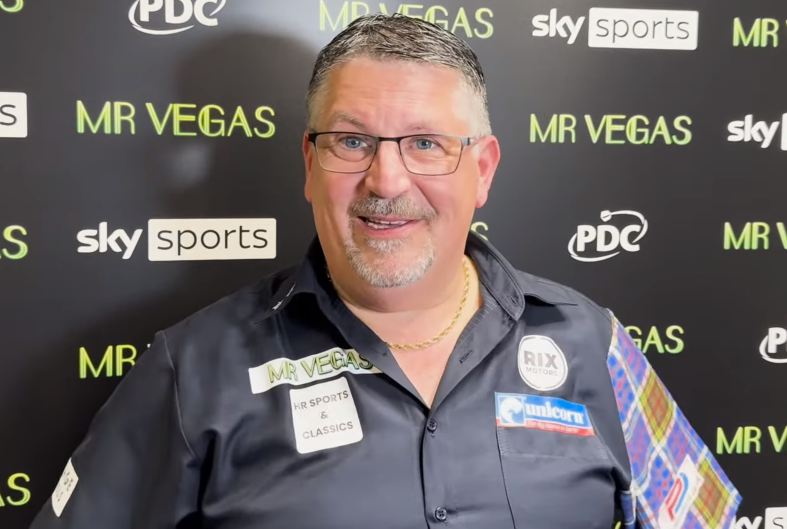
Two-time champion Gary Anderson (pictured in 2024) contested his eighth World Championship semi-final.

The semi-finals (best of 11 sets) took place on 2 January. Luke Littler faced Ryan Searle and Gian van Veen faced Gary Anderson. Searle and Van Veen both featured in their first World Championship semi-final, Anderson contested his first semi-final since 2022 and eighth in total, and Littler reached the semi-finals for the third year in a row. Searle described his tie against Littler as "potentially the toughest game of them all" and one he was "probably not expected to win". Littler called himself "the next man in Ryan [Searle]'s way" and hoped to have a good match. Van Veen expressed his excitement at facing his "darting idol" Gary Anderson, while Anderson asserted that the difference in experience between him and Van Veen made little difference in their match.

Searle claimed the opening set of his match with Littler, despite the defending champion producing a 10-dart leg and registering a set average of 105. Littler responded with two breaks of throw on his way to winning the second set, soon taking control of the match and establishing a 4–1 lead. He completed a run of 10 consecutive legs won to extend his lead to 5–1, and although Searle capitalised on a failed nine-darter attempt from his opponent to land a 170 checkout, Littler added another set to win 6–1. He ended the match with a three-dart average of 105.35, his third average of the tournament above 105, and hit 10 maximums. The win extended Littler's unbeaten record in major ranking semi-finals to 11. Littler recounted his annoyance at losing the first set and telling himself that he would find the lead; he later said that Ryan Searle "can be proud" of the "amazing" tournament he had.

In the second semi-final, Anderson took the first set but Van Veen started the second with a 10-dart leg, landing a 117 checkout to level the score at 1–1. The Dutchman then won the next two sets to lead Anderson 3–1. Anderson opened the fifth set with a 10-dart break of throw and followed it with a 170 checkout to go 2–0 ahead in legs. However, Van Veen converted a 170 checkout of his own and claimed the set in a deciding leg to extend his advantage to 4–1, defying a set average of 117.44 from his opponent. The sequence was dubbed a "set of darts from God" by Wayne Mardle on commentary. Anderson reduced the deficit to 4–3 after Van Veen missed darts at double to go one set away from victory, but Van Veen was able to claim the next two, completing a 6–3 win with a 13-dart leg. The nine-set match, in which both players averaged over 102, was the longest World Championship semi-final in four years. Van Veen stated that he "enjoyed every single second" of the contest and claimed that his first dream was to simply be in a World Championship, rather than reach the final of one.

=== Final ===
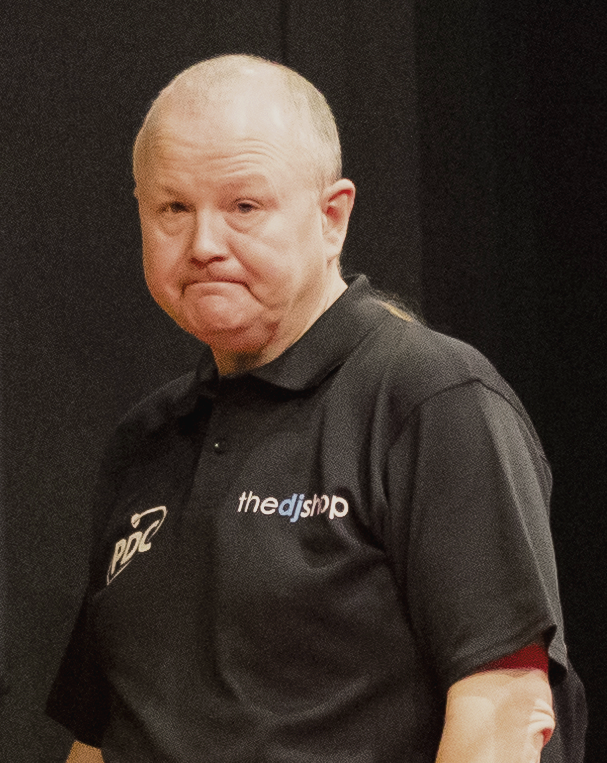
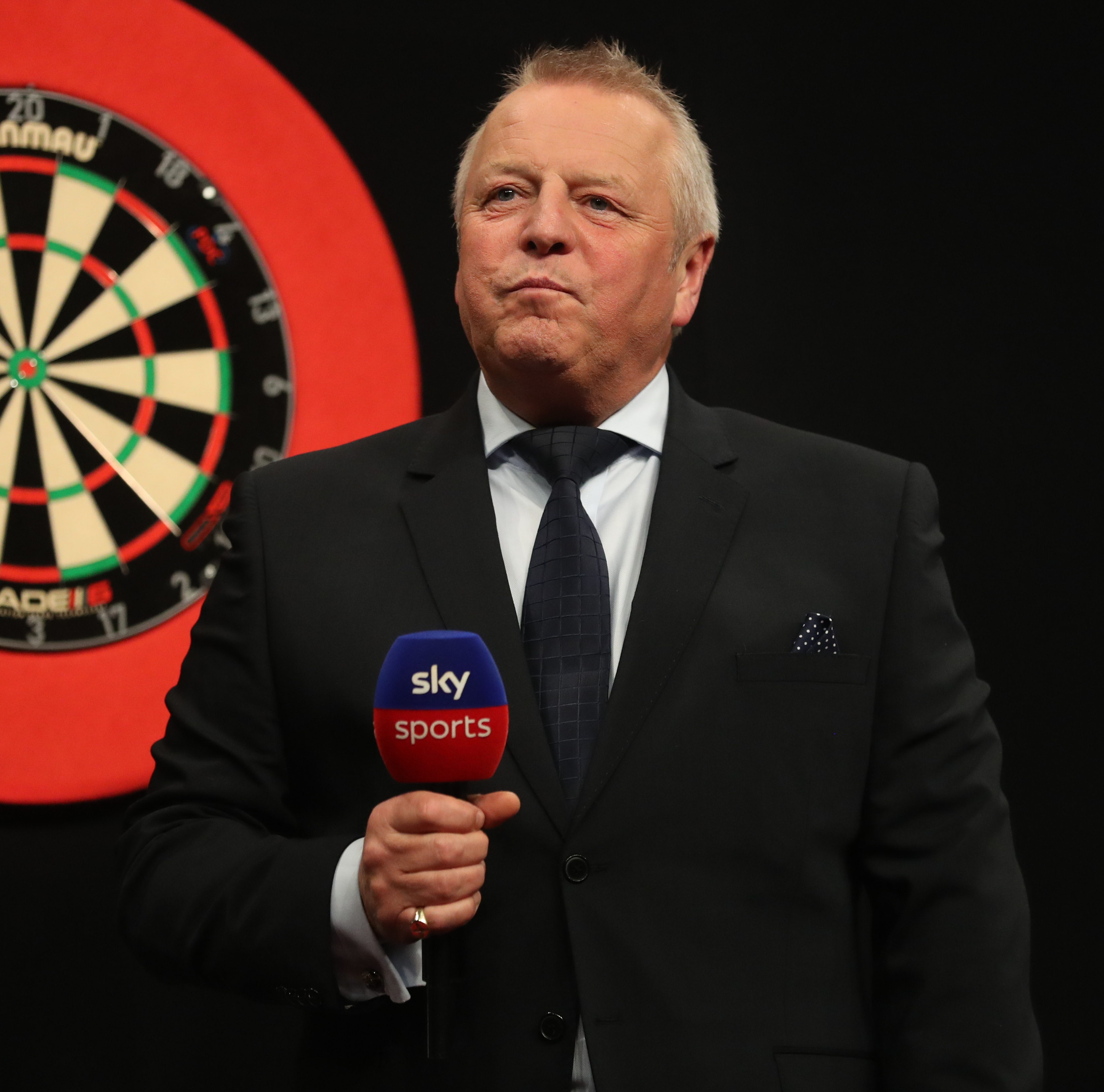
Referee George Noble (left) retired from darts following the tournament, along with John McDonald (right), the PDC's full-time master of ceremonies since 2007.
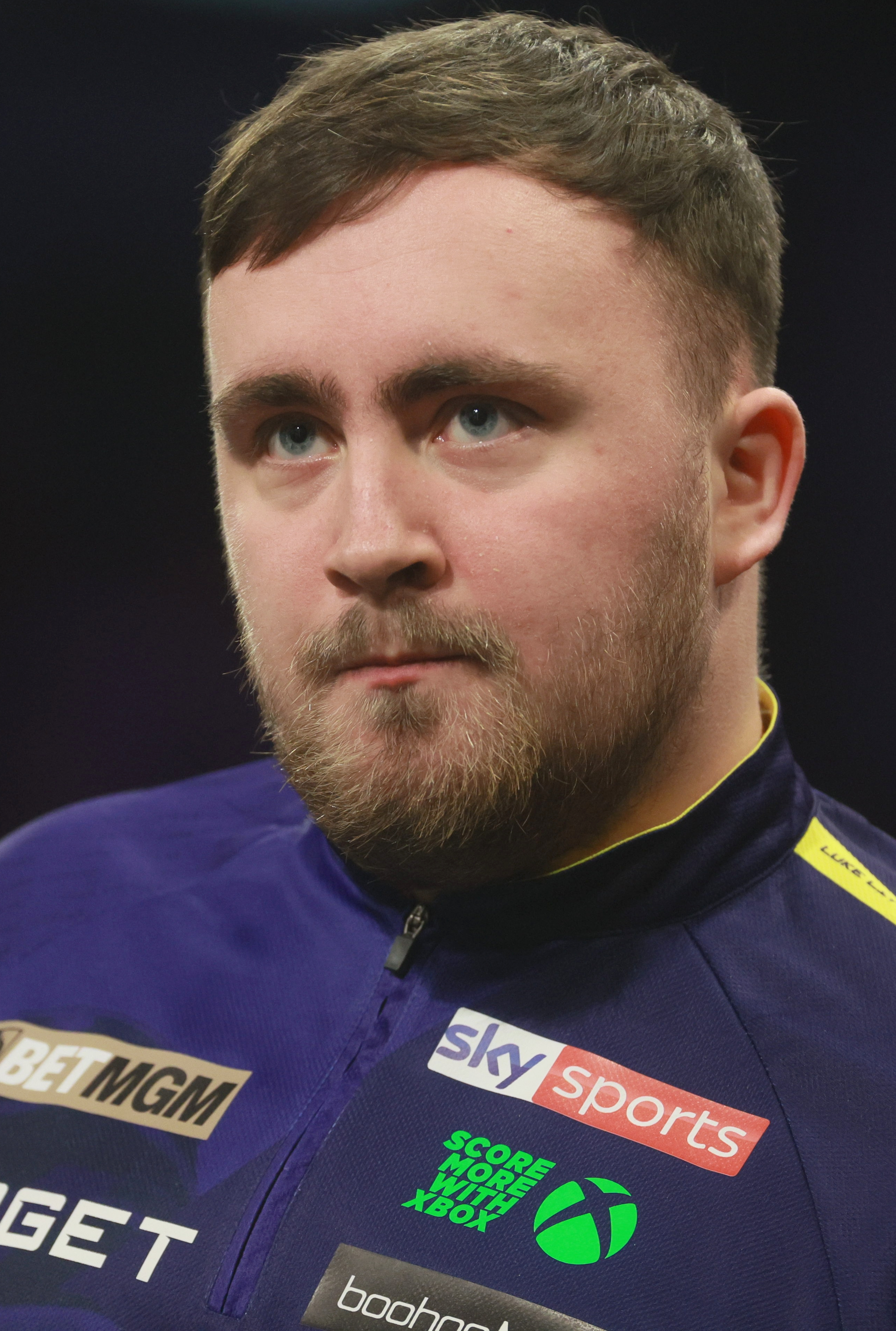
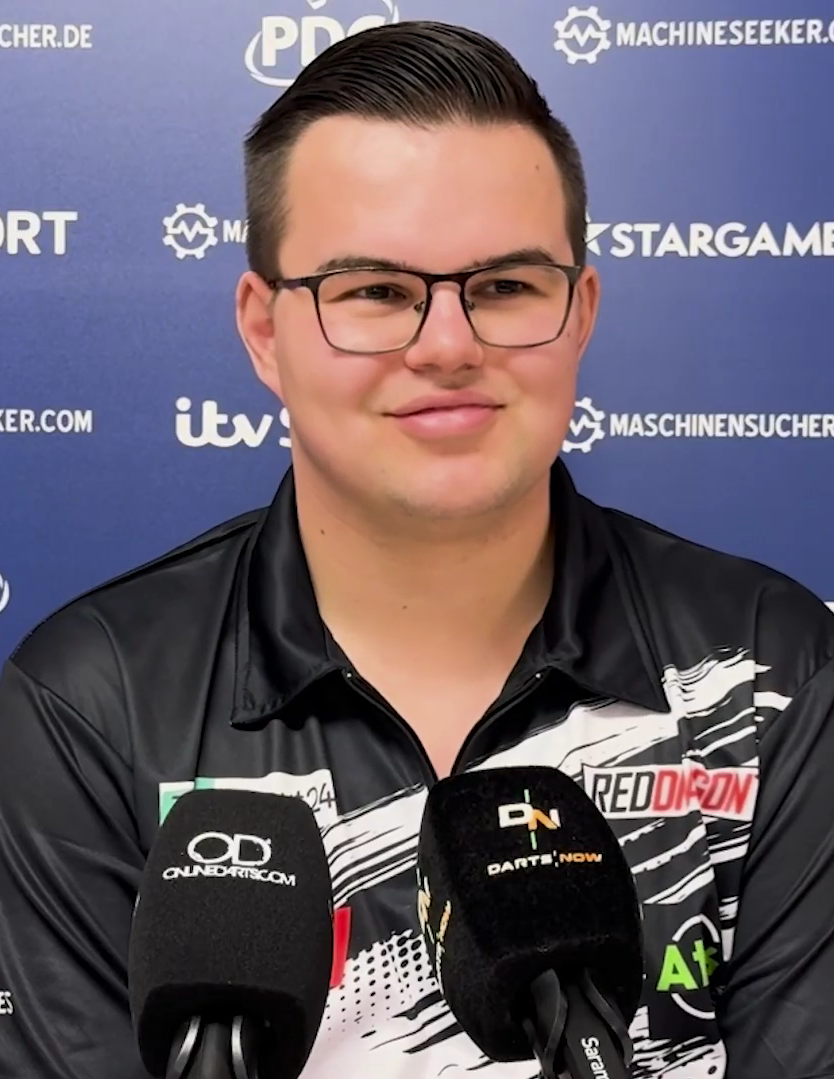
Luke Littler (left) won his second world title, defeating first-time finalist Gian van Veen (right) 7–1 in the final.

The final (best of 13 sets) between Luke Littler and Gian van Veen took place on 3 January. The final was officiated by referee George Noble, who announced his intention to retire following the World Championship along with John McDonald, the PDC's full-time master of ceremonies since 2007. The duo were subsequently inducted into the PDC Hall of Fame. Littler contested his third successive final, with his only previous defeat on the Alexandra Palace stage being against Luke Humphries in the 2024 final. He became the fourth player to reach three finals in a row—after Dennis Priestley, Phil Taylor and Gary Anderson—and the second player to reach the final in each of their first three appearances, after Taylor. Van Veen contested his first final, becoming the third Dutch player to reach a PDC World Championship final, after Raymond van Barneveld and Michael van Gerwen. A rematch of the 2023 PDC World Youth Championship final that Littler won 6–4, Van Veen entered the match having beaten Littler in three of their five meetings in 2025. The pair held a combined age of 41, making the match the youngest World Championship final in history.

Van Veen landed a 116 finish to win the opening leg of the match before claiming the set to take a 1–0 lead. He converted checkouts of 145 and 127 to win the first two legs of the second set, but Littler rebounded and hit his own 116 finish to level at 1–1. He hit his second 170 checkout of the tournament to win the third set and lead 2–1. Littler claimed the fourth set without reply. Although Van Veen halted his momentum with a 137 checkout to open the fifth set, Littler won the next three legs to extend his lead to 4–1. The sixth set saw Van Veen leave a trace of blood on the dartboard, causing the board to be replaced; he later revealed that his little finger got stuck in a door while going to the toilet during the interval. After winning both the sixth and seventh sets 3–0 in legs, Littler sealed a 7–1 victory by following a maximum with a 147 checkout—treble 20, treble 19, double 15. Littler finished the match, his 20th straight win in all competitions, with a three-dart average of 106.02, 16 maximums and a 46 per cent checkout success rate. In all, Littler won 21 of the last 24 legs in the final.

Littler won the PDC World Championship for the second time, having only lost four sets across the tournament. He became the fourth player to win back-to-back PDC world titles—after Taylor, Adrian Lewis and Anderson—and the first player to retain the title since Anderson at the 2016 World Championship. He also became the seventh player to win the title on more than one occasion. His retention of the title ended a run of five successive different winners that had begun in 2021, the longest such sequence in the tournament's history. Littler was the first recipient of the £1,000,000 top prize, extending his lead at the top of the PDC Order of Merit. After being awarded the Sid Waddell Trophy by cyclist Chris Hoy, Littler quoted boxer Anthony Joshua by saying: "The first time was so nice, I had to do it twice." He emphasised his desire to follow his "very special" victory with more success, stating: "We've got to keep going, we've got to keep adding more titles. We can't stop here. We're still on this rollercoaster." Littler also won the "Ballon d'Art" award for recording the most 180s at the tournament, with 73. Van Veen, who earned £400,000 for his runner-up finish, said he "would have liked to lift up the title" and "would have liked to have given Luke [Littler] a game", ultimately calling Littler "unplayable" and admitting that it "doesn't feel great" to "get smashed" in the final. Speaking about Littler on Sky Sports, Wayne Mardle claimed there was "nothing he can't do on a dartboard", adding: "The format doesn't matter any more. He's just the best."

== Schedule ==
The event consisted of 36 sessions held across 20 days from 11 December 2025 until the date of the final on Saturday, 3 January 2026. The schedule of play for round one was confirmed on 26 November 2025. The figures to the right of a player's name show their three-dart average in a match. Players in bold denote match winners.

Thursday, 11 December

Evening session (19:00 GMT)
Match no.	Round	Player 1	Score	Player 2	Set 1	Set 2	Set 3	Set 4	Set 5
01	1	Kim Huybrechts 86.24	1–**3**	**Arno Merk** 89.73	2–**3**	0–**3**	**3**–1	0–**3**	—N/a
02	1	**Michael Smith** 91.19	**3**–0	Lisa Ashton 77.13	**3**–2	**3**–0	**3**–1	—N/a	
03	1	**Luke Littler** 101.54	**3**–0	Darius Labanauskas 95.25	**3**–2	**3**–2	**3**–1	—N/a	
04	1	**Madars Razma** 89.07	**3**–1	Jamai van den Herik 81.33	**3**–2	2–**3**	**3**–1	**3**–2	—N/a

Friday, 12 December

Afternoon session (12:30 GMT)
Match no.	Round	Player 1	Score	Player 2	Set 1	Set 2	Set 3	Set 4	Set 5
05	1	**Niels Zonneveld** 92.68	**3**–0	Haupai Puha 86.41	**3**–2	**3**–2	**3**–0	—N/a	
06	1	**Ian White** 81.13	**3**–2	Mervyn King 81.54	**3**–1	**3**–0	2–**3**	2–**3**	**3**–0
07	1	**Ryan Searle** 93.29	**3**–0	Chris Landman 85.59	**3**–0	**3**–2	**3**–1	—N/a	
08	1	**Rob Cross** 90.84	**3**–0	Cor Dekker 82.05	**3**–0	**3**–2	**3**–0	—N/a	

Evening session (19:00 GMT)
Match no.	Round	Player 1	Score	Player 2	Set 1	Set 2	Set 3	Set 4	Set 5
09	1	Ross Smith 96.89	2–**3**	**Andreas Harrysson** 93.85	**3**–2	2–**3**	**3**–1	2–**3**	1–**3**
10	1	**Ricky Evans** 92.26	**3**–0	Man Lok Leung 89.65	**3**–1	**3**–2	**3**–2	—N/a	
11	1	**Gian van Veen** 98.91	**3**–1	Cristo Reyes 96.16	**3**–1	**3**–0	1–**3**	**3**–2	—N/a
12	1	**Damon Heta** 91.56	**3**–1	Steve Lennon 83.87	**3**–0	**3**–1	2–**3**	**3**–0	—N/a

Saturday, 13 December

Afternoon session (12:30 GMT)
Match no.	Round	Player 1	Score	Player 2	Set 1	Set 2	Set 3	Set 4	Set 5
13	1	Mario Vandenbogaerde 87.84	0–**3**	**David Davies** 86.50	2–**3**	0–**3**	2–**3**	—N/a	
14	1	**Andrew Gilding** 97.89	**3**–1	Cam Crabtree 90.26	**3**–0	**3**–0	2–**3**	**3**–0	—N/a
15	1	**Luke Woodhouse** 90.22	**3**–1	Boris Krčmar 85.26	2–**3**	**3**–0	**3**–2	**3**–1	—N/a
16	1	**Gary Anderson** 95.20	**3**–2	Adam Hunt 94.47	**3**–2	2–**3**	2–**3**	**3**–1	**3**–1

Evening session (19:00 GMT)
Match no.	Round	Player 1	Score	Player 2	Set 1	Set 2	Set 3	Set 4	Set 5
17	1	Jeffrey de Graaf 86.88	1–**3**	**Paul Lim** 86.52	1–**3**	**3**–1	2–**3**	2–**3**	—N/a
18	1	**Wessel Nijman** 100.91	**3**–0	Karel Sedláček 90.88	**3**–1	**3**–1	**3**–1	—N/a	
19	1	**Luke Humphries** 98.58	**3**–1	Ted Evetts 85.66	**3**–0	**3**–1	1–**3**	**3**–1	—N/a
20	1	**Gabriel Clemens** 90.93	**3**–0	Alex Spellman 83.58	**3**–0	**3**–0	**3**–1	—N/a	

Sunday, 14 December

Afternoon session (12:30 GMT)
Match no.	Round	Player 1	Score	Player 2	Set 1	Set 2	Set 3	Set 4	Set 5
21	1	Ritchie Edhouse 86.96	0–**3**	**Jonny Tata** 89.63	2–**3**	1–**3**	1–**3**	—N/a	
22	1	**Dom Taylor** 85.89	**3**–0	Oskar Lukasiak 79.56	**3**–0	**3**–0	**3**–1	—N/a	
23	1	Richard Veenstra 92.74	2–**3**	**Nitin Kumar** 87.30	1–**3**	**3**–0	2–**3**	**3**–0	1–**3**
24	1	**Joe Cullen** 99.33	**3**–0	Bradley Brooks 90.09	**3**–1	**3**–0	**3**–1	—N/a	

Evening session (19:00 GMT)
Match no.	Round	Player 1	Score	Player 2	Set 1	Set 2	Set 3	Set 4	Set 5
25	1	Lukas Wenig 88.62	1–**3**	**Wesley Plaisier** 92.50	0–**3**	**3**–2	2–**3**	1–**3**	—N/a
26	1	Dimitri Van den Bergh 80.64	0–**3**	**Darren Beveridge** 91.62	0–**3**	1–**3**	0–**3**	—N/a	
27	1	**Stephen Bunting** 96.39	**3**–2	Sebastian Białecki 86.58	**3**–1	**3**–1	0–**3**	1–**3**	**4**–2
28	1	**James Hurrell** 88.78	**3**–1	Stowe Buntz 89.03	**3**–2	1–**3**	**3**–1	**3**–2	—N/a

Monday, 15 December

Afternoon session (12:30 GMT)
Match no.	Round	Player 1	Score	Player 2	Set 1	Set 2	Set 3	Set 4	Set 5
29	1	**Brendan Dolan** 89.96	**3**–1	Tavis Dudeney 89.86	**3**–1	**3**–2	2–**3**	**3**–1	—N/a
30	1	Cameron Menzies 91.99	2–**3**	**Charlie Manby** 90.62	**3**–2	2–**3**	**3**–1	2–**3**	1–**3**
31	1	**Mensur Suljović** 94.92	**3**–1	David Cameron 92.93	**3**–1	2–**3**	**3**–1	**3**–1	—N/a
32	1	**Peter Wright** 83.51	**3**–0	Noa-Lynn van Leuven 82.87	**3**–1	**3**–2	**3**–0	—N/a	

Evening session (19:00 GMT)
Match no.	Round	Player 1	Score	Player 2	Set 1	Set 2	Set 3	Set 4	Set 5
33	1	Martin Lukeman 85.31	1–**3**	**Max Hopp** 88.32	0–**3**	2–**3**	**3**–2	0–**3**	—N/a
34	1	**Dirk van Duijvenbode** 98.54	**3**–2	Andy Baetens 92.50	**3**–1	1–**3**	1–**3**	**3**–1	**3**–1
35	1	**Jonny Clayton** 92.53	**3**–1	Adam Lipscombe 87.60	**3**–1	2–**3**	**3**–1	**3**–1	—N/a
36	1	**Connor Scutt** 90.70	**3**–2	Simon Whitlock 85.82	**3**–1	**3**–2	2–**3**	2–**3**	**3**–1

Tuesday, 16 December

Afternoon session (12:30 GMT)
Match no.	Round	Player 1	Score	Player 2	Set 1	Set 2	Set 3	Set 4	Set 5
37	1	**Alan Soutar** 90.90	**3**–2	Teemu Harju 82.61	**3**–0	**3**–0	2–**3**	2–**3**	**6**–5
38	1	Nick Kenny 92.95	0–**3**	**Justin Hood** 99.59	0–**3**	2–**3**	1–**3**	—N/a	
39	1	**Scott Williams** 99.25	**3**–0	Paolo Nebrida 95.66	**3**–1	**3**–0	**3**–1	—N/a	
40	1	**Chris Dobey** 92.81	**3**–1	Xiaochen Zong 84.61	**3**–0	1–**3**	**3**–1	**3**–1	—N/a

Evening session (19:00 GMT)
Match no.	Round	Player 1	Score	Player 2	Set 1	Set 2	Set 3	Set 4	Set 5
41	1	**Ricardo Pietreczko** 90.86	**3**–1	José de Sousa 90.46	**3**–2	**3**–2	2–**3**	**3**–1	—N/a
42	1	**Danny Noppert** 96.62	**3**–1	Jurjen van der Velde 89.27	**3**–2	1–**3**	**3**–2	**3**–0	—N/a
43	1	**Gerwyn Price** 96.44	**3**–0	Adam Gawlas 79.10	**3**–0	**3**–2	**3**–0	—N/a	
44	1	Niko Springer 86.95	1–**3**	**Joe Comito** 85.47	2–**3**	**3**–1	0–**3**	2–**3**	—N/a

Wednesday, 17 December

Evening session (19:00 GMT)
Match no.	Round	Player 1	Score	Player 2	Set 1	Set 2	Set 3	Set 4	Set 5
45	1	Matt Campbell 90.46	1–**3**	**Adam Sevada** 88.29	1–**3**	**3**–2	2–**3**	0–**3**	—N/a
46	1	Raymond van Barneveld 92.50	0–**3**	**Stefan Bellmont** 91.36	1–**3**	0–**3**	1–**3**	—N/a	
47	1	**James Wade** 94.75	**3**–0	Ryusei Azemoto 84.42	**3**–1	**3**–0	**3**–0	—N/a	
48	1	**Martin Schindler** 99.14	**3**–1	Stephen Burton 86.43	**3**–1	0–**3**	**3**–0	**3**–0	—N/a

Thursday, 18 December

Afternoon session (12:30 GMT)
Match no.	Round	Player 1	Score	Player 2	Set 1	Set 2	Set 3	Set 4	Set 5
49	1	**Callan Rydz** 88.39	**3**–0	Patrik Kovács 84.93	**3**–1	**3**–1	**3**–1	—N/a	
50	1	Thibault Tricole 83.11	0–**3**	**Motomu Sakai** 87.38	2–**3**	2–**3**	0–**3**	—N/a	
51	1	**Ryan Joyce** 95.27	**3**–0	Owen Bates 83.64	**3**–0	**3**–1	**3**–0	—N/a	
52	1	Mike De Decker 83.83	2–**3**	**David Munyua** 80.78	**3**–1	**3**–2	2–**3**	2–**3**	1–**3**

Evening session (19:00 GMT)
Match no.	Round	Player 1	Score	Player 2	Set 1	Set 2	Set 3	Set 4	Set 5
53	1	**Jermaine Wattimena** 87.28	**3**–2	Dominik Grüllich 81.67	**3**–1	2–**3**	2–**3**	**3**–1	**3**–0
54	1	**Dave Chisnall** 89.66	**3**–0	Fallon Sherrock 84.83	**3**–1	**3**–0	**3**–2	—N/a	
55	1	**Michael van Gerwen** 90.82	**3**–1	Mitsuhiko Tatsunami 84.40	1–**3**	**3**–2	**3**–1	**3**–2	—N/a
56	1	**Krzysztof Ratajski** 97.67	**3**–0	Alexis Toylo 91.03	**3**–0	**3**–1	**3**–1	—N/a	

Friday, 19 December

Afternoon session (12:30 GMT)
Match no.	Round	Player 1	Score	Player 2	Set 1	Set 2	Set 3	Set 4	Set 5
57	1	**Kevin Doets** 92.11	**3**–1	Matthew Dennant 86.75	2–**3**	**3**–1	**3**–2	**3**–2	—N/a
58	1	**Ryan Meikle** 89.14	**3**–0	Jesús Salate 80.85	**3**–0	**3**–0	**3**–1	—N/a	
59	1	Mickey Mansell 83.00	2–**3**	**Leonard Gates** 87.05	2–**3**	**3**–0	1–**3**	**3**–1	0–**3**
60	1	**Josh Rock** 90.18	**3**–1	Gemma Hayter 80.73	**3**–1	**3**–0	1–**3**	**3**–2	—N/a

Evening session (19:00 GMT)
Match no.	Round	Player 1	Score	Player 2	Set 1	Set 2	Set 3	Set 4	Set 5
61	1	**William O'Connor** 102.36	**3**–0	Krzysztof Kciuk 85.34	**3**–2	**3**–0	**3**–0	—N/a	
62	1	**Daryl Gurney** 89.77	**3**–2	Beau Greaves 91.55	**3**–2	1–**3**	**3**–2	0–**3**	**3**–1
63	1	**Nathan Aspinall** 94.01	**3**–1	Lourence Ilagan 90.62	2–**3**	**3**–1	**3**–2	**3**–2	—N/a
64	1	**Keane Barry** 92.84	**3**–0	Tim Pusey 89.12	**3**–2	**3**–0	**3**–1	—N/a	

Saturday, 20 December

Afternoon session (12:30 GMT)
Match no.	Round	Player 1	Score	Player 2	Set 1	Set 2	Set 3	Set 4	Set 5
65	2	**Ryan Searle** 98.67	**3**–0	Brendan Dolan 88.45	**3**–1	**3**–0	**3**–1	—N/a	
66	2	**Andreas Harrysson** 88.06	**3**–0	Motomu Sakai 88.29	**3**–2	**3**–1	**3**–2	—N/a	
67	2	Dirk van Duijvenbode 92.67	2–**3**	**James Hurrell** 92.83	**3**–1	0–**3**	1–**3**	**3**–1	1–**3**
68	2	Dave Chisnall 88.15	2–**3**	**Ricardo Pietreczko** 88.58	1–**3**	1–**3**	**3**–1	**3**–0	2–**4**

Evening session (19:00 GMT)
Match no.	Round	Player 1	Score	Player 2	Set 1	Set 2	Set 3	Set 4	Set 5
69	2	Michael Smith 97.93	1–**3**	**Niels Zonneveld** 94.52	1–**3**	**3**–1	2–**3**	0–**3**	—N/a
70	2	Chris Dobey 94.92	1–**3**	**Andrew Gilding** 99.01	**3**–2	0–**3**	1–**3**	2–**3**	—N/a
71	2	**Stephen Bunting** 94.11	**3**–0	Nitin Kumar 75.18	**3**–1	**3**–0	**3**–1	—N/a	
72	2	**Jonny Clayton**	w/o	Dom Taylor	—N/a				

Sunday, 21 December

Afternoon session (12:30 GMT)
Match no.	Round	Player 1	Score	Player 2	Set 1	Set 2	Set 3	Set 4	Set 5
73	2	Ryan Joyce 86.75	1–**3**	**Krzysztof Ratajski** 93.91	1–**3**	1–**3**	**3**–0	0–**3**	—N/a
74	2	Joe Cullen 86.53	1–**3**	**Mensur Suljović** 81.95	**3**–0	1–**3**	2–**3**	2–**3**	—N/a
75	2	**Luke Woodhouse** 92.48	**3**–0	Max Hopp 84.78	**3**–0	**3**–0	**3**–1	—N/a	
76	2	**Rob Cross** 91.71	**3**–1	Ian White 85.78	**3**–1	0–**3**	**3**–0	**3**–2	—N/a

Evening session (19:00 GMT)
Match no.	Round	Player 1	Score	Player 2	Set 1	Set 2	Set 3	Set 4	Set 5
77	2	**Martin Schindler** 96.16	**3**–0	Keane Barry 94.21	**3**–2	**3**–2	**3**–2	—N/a	
78	2	Gerwyn Price 95.83	0–**3**	**Wesley Plaisier** 94.28	1–**3**	1–**3**	2–**3**	—N/a	
79	2	**Luke Littler** 97.15	**3**–0	David Davies 95.53	**3**–2	**3**–1	**3**–0	—N/a	
80	2	**Damon Heta** 91.23	**3**–2	Stefan Bellmont 88.32	1–**3**	**3**–1	1–**3**	**3**–1	**3**–1

Monday, 22 December

Afternoon session (12:30 GMT)
Match no.	Round	Player 1	Score	Player 2	Set 1	Set 2	Set 3	Set 4	Set 5
81	2	Darren Beveridge 90.66	1–**3**	**Madars Razma** 97.10	0–**3**	2–**3**	**3**–1	2–**3**	—N/a
82	2	Wessel Nijman 91.96	0–**3**	**Gabriel Clemens** 89.86	1–**3**	2–**3**	1–**3**	—N/a	
83	2	David Munyua 83.60	0–**3**	**Kevin Doets** 90.12	1–**3**	0–**3**	1–**3**	—N/a	
84	2	James Wade 92.51	2–**3**	**Ricky Evans** 88.19	2–**3**	**3**–1	2–**3**	**3**–0	4–**6**

Evening session (19:00 GMT)
Match no.	Round	Player 1	Score	Player 2	Set 1	Set 2	Set 3	Set 4	Set 5
85	2	**Gian van Veen** 108.28	**3**–1	Alan Soutar 95.15	1–**3**	**3**–2	**3**–0	**3**–0	—N/a
86	2	**Nathan Aspinall** 91.76	**3**–0	Leonard Gates 88.00	**3**–1	**3**–1	**3**–1	—N/a	
87	2	**Luke Humphries** 97.21	**3**–0	Paul Lim 85.24	**3**–0	**3**–0	**3**–1	—N/a	
88	2	**Charlie Manby** 90.88	**3**–0	Adam Sevada 79.04	**3**–0	**3**–0	**3**–1	—N/a	

Tuesday, 23 December

Afternoon session (12:30 GMT)
Match no.	Round	Player 1	Score	Player 2	Set 1	Set 2	Set 3	Set 4	Set 5
89	2	Jonny Tata 86.51	2–**3**	**Ryan Meikle** 85.54	**3**–1	**3**–2	2–**3**	1–**3**	1–**3**
90	2	Daryl Gurney 93.21	2–**3**	**Callan Rydz** 96.59	1–**3**	**3**–0	**3**–1	0–**3**	3–**5**
91	2	**Jermaine Wattimena** 95.91	**3**–2	Scott Williams 92.96	**3**–2	**3**–2	1–**3**	0–**3**	**3**–0
92	2	Peter Wright 79.20	0–**3**	**Arno Merk** 92.17	0–**3**	1–**3**	1–**3**	—N/a	

Evening session (19:00 GMT)
Match no.	Round	Player 1	Score	Player 2	Set 1	Set 2	Set 3	Set 4	Set 5
93	2	Danny Noppert 102.27	2–**3**	**Justin Hood** 103.01	2–**3**	1–**3**	**3**–2	**3**–1	5–**6**
94	2	**Gary Anderson** 105.41	**3**–1	Connor Scutt 97.84	1–**3**	**3**–1	**3**–1	**3**–1	—N/a
95	2	**Michael van Gerwen** 100.20	**3**–1	William O'Connor 93.50	**3**–2	**3**–0	1–**3**	**3**–0	—N/a
96	2	**Josh Rock** 101.32	**3**–0	Joe Comito 90.22	**3**–1	**3**–0	**3**–1	—N/a	

Saturday, 27 December

Afternoon session (12:30 GMT)
Match no.	Round	Player 1	Score	Player 2	Set 1	Set 2	Set 3	Set 4	Set 5	Set 6	Set 7
97	3	Wesley Plaisier 95.80	3–**4**	**Krzysztof Ratajski** 98.43	**3**–0	0–**3**	**3**–1	**3**–2	2–**3**	2–**3**	1–**3**
98	3	Andrew Gilding 86.48	1–**4**	**Luke Woodhouse** 95.66	1–**3**	**3**–1	0–**3**	0–**3**	2–**3**	—N/a	
99	3	**Jonny Clayton** 98.44	**4**–3	Niels Zonneveld 99.36	**3**–2	1–**3**	**3**–0	0–**3**	**3**–2	1–**3**	**3**–0

Evening session (19:00 GMT)
Match no.	Round	Player 1	Score	Player 2	Set 1	Set 2	Set 3	Set 4	Set 5	Set 6	Set 7
100	3	**Andreas Harrysson** 96.11	**4**–2	Ricardo Pietreczko 88.60	**3**–2	2–**3**	**3**–0	1–**3**	**3**–0	**3**–1	—N/a
101	3	Stephen Bunting 91.43	3–**4**	**James Hurrell** 98.48	1–**3**	**3**–2	**3**–2	0–**3**	1–**3**	**3**–2	1–**3**
102	3	**Luke Littler** 107.09	**4**–0	Mensur Suljović 96.21	**3**–0	**3**–0	**3**–2	**3**–1	—N/a		

Sunday, 28 December

Afternoon session (12:30 GMT)
Match no.	Round	Player 1	Score	Player 2	Set 1	Set 2	Set 3	Set 4	Set 5	Set 6	Set 7
103	3	Martin Schindler 89.89	0–**4**	**Ryan Searle** 102.29	1–**3**	1–**3**	0–**3**	0–**3**	—N/a		
104	3	Damon Heta 92.54	0–**4**	**Rob Cross** 94.11	1–**3**	2–**3**	2–**3**	1–**3**	—N/a		
105	3	**Gary Anderson** 102.24	**4**–3	Jermaine Wattimena 95.26	**3**–1	0–**3**	**3**–1	**3**–2	2–**3**	2–**3**	**5**–3

Evening session (19:00 GMT)
Match no.	Round	Player 1	Score	Player 2	Set 1	Set 2	Set 3	Set 4	Set 5	Set 6	Set 7
106	3	**Gian van Veen** 97.91	**4**–1	Madars Razma 89.40	**3**–1	**3**–1	**3**–0	0–**3**	**3**–0	—N/a	
107	3	**Luke Humphries** 100.14	**4**–2	Gabriel Clemens 101.49	**3**–1	**3**–1	**3**–2	0–**3**	2–**3**	**3**–2	—N/a
108	3	**Michael van Gerwen** 99.70	**4**–1	Arno Merk 90.88	**3**–1	**3**–0	1–**3**	**3**–1	**3**–1	—N/a	

Monday, 29 December

Afternoon session (12:30 GMT)
Match no.	Round	Player 1	Score	Player 2	Set 1	Set 2	Set 3	Set 4	Set 5	Set 6	Set 7
109	3	**Justin Hood** 94.68	**4**–1	Ryan Meikle 95.40	**3**–2	**3**–1	**3**–0	1–**3**	**3**–2	—N/a	
110	3	Ricky Evans 83.34	2–**4**	**Charlie Manby** 89.50	**3**–1	2–**3**	**3**–0	2–**3**	1–**3**	0–**3**	—N/a
111	3	Nathan Aspinall 94.97	3–**4**	**Kevin Doets** 97.48	**3**–1	2–**3**	**3**–2	2–**3**	**3**–2	0–**3**	0–**3**

Evening session (19:00 GMT)
Match no.	Round	Player 1	Score	Player 2	Set 1	Set 2	Set 3	Set 4	Set 5	Set 6	Set 7
112	3	**Josh Rock** 98.98	**4**–1	Callan Rydz 93.39	1–**3**	**3**–2	**3**–0	**3**–2	**3**–2	—N/a	
113	4	James Hurrell 89.51	0–**4**	**Ryan Searle** 100.57	2–**3**	0–**3**	1–**3**	1–**3**	—N/a		
114	4	**Luke Littler** 106.58	**4**–2	Rob Cross 98.92	**3**–1	1–**3**	**3**–0	**3**–1	2–**3**	**3**–2	—N/a

Tuesday, 30 December

Afternoon session (12:30 GMT)
Match no.	Round	Player 1	Score	Player 2	Set 1	Set 2	Set 3	Set 4	Set 5	Set 6	Set 7
115	4	Luke Woodhouse 91.40	2–**4**	**Krzysztof Ratajski** 96.68	1–**3**	**3**–1	1–**3**	**3**–1	1–**3**	1–**3**	—N/a
116	4	**Jonny Clayton** 92.79	**4**–2	Andreas Harrysson 91.47	**3**–2	1–**3**	2–**3**	**3**–2	**3**–2	**3**–2	—N/a
117	4	**Justin Hood** 101.18	**4**–0	Josh Rock 96.31	**3**–2	**3**–2	**3**–1	**3**–1	—N/a		

Evening session (19:00 GMT)
Match no.	Round	Player 1	Score	Player 2	Set 1	Set 2	Set 3	Set 4	Set 5	Set 6	Set 7
118	4	Charlie Manby 94.74	1–**4**	**Gian van Veen** 98.48	2–**3**	**3**–1	1–**3**	0–**3**	2–**3**	—N/a	
119	4	Michael van Gerwen 99.81	1–**4**	**Gary Anderson** 99.10	2–**3**	2–**3**	**3**–1	1–**3**	1–**3**	—N/a	
120	4	**Luke Humphries** 103.07	**4**–1	Kevin Doets 92.33	1–**3**	**3**–1	**3**–1	**3**–0	**3**–0	—N/a	

Thursday, 1 January

Afternoon session (12:30 GMT)
Match no.	Round	Player 1	Score	Player 2	Set 1	Set 2	Set 3	Set 4	Set 5	Set 6	Set 7	Set 8	Set 9
121	QF	**Ryan Searle** 91.32	**5**–2	Jonny Clayton 93.67	**3**–1	**3**–0	**3**–1	1–**3**	**3**–2	1–**3**	**3**–0	—N/a	
122	QF	**Gary Anderson** 99.44	**5**–2	Justin Hood 93.43	**3**–0	1–**3**	**3**–0	2–**3**	**3**–0	**3**–1	**3**–0	—N/a	

Evening session (19:00 GMT)
Match no.	Round	Player 1	Score	Player 2	Set 1	Set 2	Set 3	Set 4	Set 5	Set 6	Set 7	Set 8	Set 9
123	QF	**Luke Littler** 100.04	**5**–0	Krzysztof Ratajski 96.75	**3**–2	**3**–0	**3**–0	**3**–2	**3**–1	—N/a			
124	QF	Luke Humphries 101.12	1–**5**	**Gian van Veen** 105.41	2–**3**	**3**–1	2–**3**	1–**3**	2–**3**	1–**3**	—N/a		

Friday, 2 January

Evening session (19:30 GMT)
Match no.	Round	Player 1	Score	Player 2	Set 1	Set 2	Set 3	Set 4	Set 5	Set 6	Set 7	Set 8	Set 9	Set 10	Set 11
125	SF	**Luke Littler** 105.35	**6**–1	Ryan Searle 93.31	2–**3**	**3**–1	**3**–2	**3**–0	**3**–0	**3**–0	**3**–2	—N/a			
126	SF	**Gian van Veen** 102.99	**6**–3	Gary Anderson 102.91	1–**3**	**3**–1	**3**–2	**3**–2	**3**–2	1–**3**	2–**3**	**3**–2	**3**–2	—N/a	

Saturday, 3 January

Evening session (20:00 GMT)
Match no.	Round	Player 1	Score	Player 2	Set 1	Set 2	Set 3	Set 4	Set 5	Set 6	Set 7	Set 8	Set 9	Set 10	Set 11	Set 12	Set 13
127	F	**Luke Littler** 106.02	**7**–1	Gian van Veen 99.94	2–**3**	**3**–2	**3**–1	**3**–0	**3**–1	**3**–0	**3**–0	**3**–1	—N/a				

== Draw ==
The draw for the tournament was held on 24 November 2025, conducted live on Sky Sports News and YouTube by former semi-finalists Wayne Mardle and Mark Webster. Of the 128 qualifiers, the top 32 players on the PDC Order of Merit were seeded in standard seeding positions in the first round. The next qualifiers, ranked 33 to 64, were randomly drawn into the left hand side of the draw. These 64 players were matched up against the remaining 64 qualifiers, who were also drawn at random.

Numbers to the left of a player's name show the 32 seeded players for the tournament. The 48 international qualifiers are indicated by 'Q'. The figures to the right of a player's name show their three-dart average in a match. Players in bold denote match winners.

=== Finals ===
**Quarter-finals** (best of 9 sets); 1 January
**1**	**Luke Littler 100.04**	**5**
Krzysztof Ratajski 96.75	0
**20**	**Ryan Searle 91.32**	**5**
5	Jonny Clayton 93.67	2
2	Luke Humphries 101.12	1
**10**	**Gian van Veen 105.41**	**5**
**14**	**Gary Anderson 99.44**	**5**
Justin Hood 93.43	2

**Semi-finals** (best of 11 sets); 2 January
**1**	**Luke Littler 105.35**	**6**
20	Ryan Searle 93.31	1
**10**	**Gian van Veen 102.99**	**6**
14	Gary Anderson 102.91	3

**Final** (best of 13 sets); 3 January
**1**	**Luke Littler 106.02**	**7**
10	Gian van Veen 99.94	1

=== First quarter ===
==== Section 1 ====
**First round** (best of 5 sets); 11–19 December
**1**	**Luke Littler 101.54**	**3**
Darius Labanauskas 95.25	0
Mario Vandenbogaerde 87.84	0
**Q**	**David Davies 86.50**	**3**
**32**	**Joe Cullen 99.33**	**3**
Bradley Brooks 90.09	0
**Mensur Suljović 94.92**	**3**
Q	David Cameron 92.93	1
**16**	**Damon Heta 91.56**	**3**
Steve Lennon 83.87	1
Raymond van Barneveld 92.50	0
**Q**	**Stefan Bellmont 91.36**	**3**
**17**	**Rob Cross 90.84**	**3**
Cor Dekker 82.05	0
**Ian White 81.13**	**3**
Q	Mervyn King 81.54	2

**Second round** (best of 5 sets); 20–23 December
**1**	**Luke Littler 97.15**	**3**
Q	David Davies 95.53	0
32	Joe Cullen 86.53	1
**Mensur Suljović 81.95**	**3**
**16**	**Damon Heta 91.23**	**3**
Q	Stefan Bellmont 88.32	2
**17**	**Rob Cross 91.71**	**3**
Ian White 85.78	1

**Third round** (best of 7 sets); 27–29 December
**1**	**Luke Littler 107.09**	**4**
Mensur Suljović 96.21	0
16	Damon Heta 92.54	0
**17**	**Rob Cross 94.11**	**4**

**Fourth round** (best of 7 sets); 29–30 December
**1**	**Luke Littler 106.58**	**4**
17	Rob Cross 98.92	2

==== Section 2 ====
**First round** (best of 5 sets); 11–19 December
**8**	**Chris Dobey 92.81**	**3**
Q	Xiaochen Zong 84.61	1
**Andrew Gilding 97.89**	**3**
Cam Crabtree 90.26	1
**25**	**Luke Woodhouse 90.22**	**3**
Q	Boris Krčmar 85.26	1
Martin Lukeman 85.31	1
**Max Hopp 88.32**	**3**
**9**	**Gerwyn Price 96.44**	**3**
Q	Adam Gawlas 79.10	0
Lukas Wenig 88.62	1
**Wesley Plaisier 92.50**	**3**
**24**	**Ryan Joyce 95.27**	**3**
Owen Bates 83.64	0
**Krzysztof Ratajski 97.67**	**3**
Q	Alexis Toylo 91.03	0

**Second round** (best of 5 sets); 20–23 December
8	Chris Dobey 94.92	1
**Andrew Gilding 99.01**	**3**
**25**	**Luke Woodhouse 92.48**	**3**
Max Hopp 84.78	0
9	Gerwyn Price 95.83	0
**Wesley Plaisier 94.28**	**3**
24	Ryan Joyce 86.75	1
**Krzysztof Ratajski 93.91**	**3**

**Third round** (best of 7 sets); 27–29 December
Andrew Gilding 86.48	1
**25**	**Luke Woodhouse 95.66**	**4**
Wesley Plaisier 95.80	3
**Krzysztof Ratajski 98.43**	**4**

**Fourth round** (best of 7 sets); 29–30 December
25	Luke Woodhouse 91.40	2
**Krzysztof Ratajski 96.68**	**4**

=== Second quarter ===
==== Section 3 ====
**First round** (best of 5 sets); 11–19 December
**4**	**Stephen Bunting 96.39**	**3**
Sebastian Białecki 86.58	2
Richard Veenstra 92.74	2
**Q**	**Nitin Kumar 87.30**	**3**
**29**	**Dirk van Duijvenbode 98.54**	**3**
Q	Andy Baetens 92.50	2
**James Hurrell 88.78**	**3**
Q	Stowe Buntz 89.03	1
**13**	**Martin Schindler 99.14**	**3**
Q	Stephen Burton 86.43	1
**Keane Barry 92.84**	**3**
Q	Tim Pusey 89.12	0
**20**	**Ryan Searle 93.29**	**3**
Chris Landman 85.59	0
**Brendan Dolan 89.96**	**3**
Q	Tavis Dudeney 89.86	1

**Second round** (best of 5 sets); 20–23 December
**4**	**Stephen Bunting 94.11**	**3**
Q	Nitin Kumar 75.18	0
29	Dirk van Duijvenbode 92.67	2
**James Hurrell 92.83**	**3**
**13**	**Martin Schindler 96.16**	**3**
Keane Barry 94.21	0
**20**	**Ryan Searle 98.67**	**3**
Brendan Dolan 88.45	0

**Third round** (best of 7 sets); 27–29 December
4	Stephen Bunting 91.43	3
**James Hurrell 98.48**	**4**
13	Martin Schindler 89.89	0
**20**	**Ryan Searle 102.29**	**4**

**Fourth round** (best of 7 sets); 29–30 December
James Hurrell 89.51	0
**20**	**Ryan Searle 100.57**	**4**

==== Section 4 ====
**First round** (best of 5 sets); 11–19 December
**5**	**Jonny Clayton 92.53**	**3**
Adam Lipscombe 87.60	1
**Dom Taylor 85.89**	**3**
Q	Oskar Lukasiak 79.56	0
**28**	**Michael Smith 91.19**	**3**
Q	Lisa Ashton 77.13	0
**Niels Zonneveld 92.68**	**3**
Q	Haupai Puha 86.41	0
12	Ross Smith 96.89	2
**Q**	**Andreas Harrysson 93.85**	**3**
Thibault Tricole 83.11	0
**Q**	**Motomu Sakai 87.38**	**3**
**21**	**Dave Chisnall 89.66**	**3**
Q	Fallon Sherrock 84.83	0
**Ricardo Pietreczko 90.86**	**3**
Q	José de Sousa 90.46	1

**Second round** (best of 5 sets); 20–23 December
5	**Jonny Clayton**	**w/o**
Dom Taylor	(Note: Clayton won on walkover after Taylor was ejected from the competition for failing a drug test.)
28	Michael Smith 97.93	1
**Niels Zonneveld 94.52**	**3**
**Q**	**Andreas Harrysson 88.06**	**3**
Q	Motomu Sakai 88.29	0
21	Dave Chisnall 88.15	2
**Ricardo Pietreczko 88.58**	**3**

**Third round** (best of 7 sets); 27–29 December
**5**	**Jonny Clayton 98.44**	**4**
Niels Zonneveld 99.36	3
**Q**	**Andreas Harrysson 96.11**	**4**
Ricardo Pietreczko 88.60	2

**Fourth round** (best of 7 sets); 29–30 December
**5**	**Jonny Clayton 92.79**	**4**
Q	Andreas Harrysson 91.47	2

=== Third quarter ===
==== Section 5 ====
**First round** (best of 5 sets); 11–19 December
**2**	**Luke Humphries 98.58**	**3**
Q	Ted Evetts 85.66	1
Jeffrey de Graaf 86.88	1
**Q**	**Paul Lim 86.52**	**3**
**31**	**Wessel Nijman 100.91**	**3**
Karel Sedláček 90.88	0
**Gabriel Clemens 90.93**	**3**
Q	Alex Spellman 83.58	0
**15**	**Nathan Aspinall 94.01**	**3**
Q	Lourence Ilagan 90.62	1
Mickey Mansell 83.00	2
**Q**	**Leonard Gates 87.05**	**3**
18	Mike De Decker 83.83	2
**Q**	**David Munyua 80.78**	**3**
**Kevin Doets 92.11**	**3**
Matthew Dennant 86.75	1

**Second round** (best of 5 sets); 20–23 December
**2**	**Luke Humphries 97.21**	**3**
Q	Paul Lim 85.24	0
31	Wessel Nijman 91.96	0
**Gabriel Clemens 89.86**	**3**
**15**	**Nathan Aspinall 91.76**	**3**
Q	Leonard Gates 88.00	0
Q	David Munyua 83.60	0
**Kevin Doets 90.12**	**3**

**Third round** (best of 7 sets); 27–29 December
**2**	**Luke Humphries 100.14**	**4**
Gabriel Clemens 101.49	2
15	Nathan Aspinall 94.97	3
**Kevin Doets 97.48**	**4**

**Fourth round** (best of 7 sets); 29–30 December
**2**	**Luke Humphries 103.07**	**4**
Kevin Doets 92.33	1

==== Section 6 ====
**First round** (best of 5 sets); 11–19 December
**7**	**James Wade 94.75**	**3**
Q	Ryusei Azemoto 84.42	0
**Ricky Evans 92.26**	**3**
Q	Man Lok Leung 89.65	0
26	Cameron Menzies 91.99	2
**Q**	**Charlie Manby 90.62**	**3**
Matt Campbell 90.46	1
**Q**	**Adam Sevada 88.29**	**3**
**10**	**Gian van Veen 98.91**	**3**
Q	Cristo Reyes 96.16	1
**Alan Soutar 90.90**	**3**
Q	Teemu Harju 82.61	2
23	Dimitri Van den Bergh 80.64	0
**Darren Beveridge 91.62**	**3**
**Madars Razma 89.07**	**3**
Q	Jamai van den Herik 81.33	1

**Second round** (best of 5 sets); 20–23 December
7	James Wade 92.51	2
**Ricky Evans 88.19**	**3**
**Q**	**Charlie Manby 90.88**	**3**
Q	Adam Sevada 79.04	0
**10**	**Gian van Veen 108.28**	**3**
Alan Soutar 95.15	1
Darren Beveridge 90.66	1
**Madars Razma 97.10**	**3**

**Third round** (best of 7 sets); 27–29 December
Ricky Evans 83.34	2
**Q**	**Charlie Manby 89.50**	**4**
**10**	**Gian van Veen 97.91**	**4**
Madars Razma 89.40	1

**Fourth round** (best of 7 sets); 29–30 December
Q	Charlie Manby 94.74	1
**10**	**Gian van Veen 98.48**	**4**

=== Fourth quarter ===
==== Section 7 ====
**First round** (best of 5 sets); 11–19 December
**3**	**Michael van Gerwen 90.82**	**3**
Q	Mitsuhiko Tatsunami 84.40	1
**William O'Connor 102.36**	**3**
Q	Krzysztof Kciuk 85.34	0
**30**	**Peter Wright 83.51**	**3**
Q	Noa-Lynn van Leuven 82.87	0
Kim Huybrechts 86.24	1
**Q**	**Arno Merk 89.73**	**3**
**14**	**Gary Anderson 95.20**	**3**
Q	Adam Hunt 94.47	2
**Connor Scutt 90.70**	**3**
Q	Simon Whitlock 85.82	2
**19**	**Jermaine Wattimena 87.28**	**3**
Dominik Grüllich 81.67	2
**Scott Williams 99.25**	**3**
Q	Paolo Nebrida 95.66	0

**Second round** (best of 5 sets); 20–23 December
**3**	**Michael van Gerwen 100.20**	**3**
William O'Connor 93.50	1
30	Peter Wright 79.20	0
**Q**	**Arno Merk 92.17**	**3**
**14**	**Gary Anderson 105.41**	**3**
Connor Scutt 97.84	1
**19**	**Jermaine Wattimena 95.91**	**3**
Scott Williams 92.69	2

**Third round** (best of 7 sets); 27–29 December
**3**	**Michael van Gerwen 99.70**	**4**
Q	Arno Merk 90.88	1
**14**	**Gary Anderson 102.24**	**4**
19	Jermaine Wattimena 95.26	3

**Fourth round** (best of 7 sets); 29–30 December
3	Michael van Gerwen 99.81	1
**14**	**Gary Anderson 99.10**	**4**

==== Section 8 ====
**First round** (best of 5 sets); 11–19 December
**6**	**Danny Noppert 96.62**	**3**
Q	Jurjen van der Velde 89.27	1
Nick Kenny 92.95	0
**Justin Hood 99.59**	**3**
27	Ritchie Edhouse 86.96	0
**Q**	**Jonny Tata 89.63**	**3**
**Ryan Meikle 89.14**	**3**
Q	Jesús Sálate 80.85	0
**11**	**Josh Rock 90.18**	**3**
Q	Gemma Hayter 80.73	1
Niko Springer 86.95	1
**Q**	**Joe Comito 85.47**	**3**
**22**	**Daryl Gurney 89.77**	**3**
Q	Beau Greaves 91.55	2
**Callan Rydz 88.39**	**3**
Q	Patrik Kovács 84.93	0

**Second round** (best of 5 sets); 20–23 December
6	Danny Noppert 102.27	2
**Justin Hood 103.01**	**3**
Q	Jonny Tata 86.51	2
**Ryan Meikle 85.54**	**3**
**11**	**Josh Rock 101.32**	**3**
Q	Joe Comito 90.22	0
22	Daryl Gurney 93.21	2
**Callan Rydz 96.59**	**3**

**Third round** (best of 7 sets); 27–29 December
**Justin Hood 94.68**	**4**
Ryan Meikle 95.40	1
**11**	**Josh Rock 98.98**	**4**
Callan Rydz 93.39	1

**Fourth round** (best of 7 sets); 29–30 December
**Justin Hood 101.18**	**4**
11	Josh Rock 96.31	0

== Final statistics ==
Best of 13 sets Referee: George Noble; Alexandra Palace, London, England, 3 January 2026
Luke Littler	7–1	Gian van Veen
2–3, 3–2, 3–1, 3–0, 3–1, 3–0, 3–0, 3–1
106.02	Average (3 darts)	99.94
42	100+ scores	39
19	140+ scores	18
16	180 scores	9
170	Highest checkout	145
4	100+ Checkouts	4
23/50 (46%)	Checkout summary	8/21 (38%)

== Tournament statistics ==
=== Highest averages ===
This table shows all three-dart averages over 100 achieved by players throughout the tournament. For players with multiple high averages, this is indicated by the number in brackets.

The three-dart average is the most cited statistic in darts matches as it gives a rough estimate of a player's form. For comparison with previous years, see the highest ever recorded averages in the World Darts Championship.

Player	Round	Average	Opponent	Result
Gian van Veen	2	108.28	Alan Soutar	Won
Luke Littler	3	107.09	Mensur Suljović	Won
Luke Littler (2)	4	106.58	Rob Cross	Won
Luke Littler (3)	F	106.02	Gian van Veen	Won
Gary Anderson	2	105.41	Connor Scutt	Won
Gian van Veen (2)	QF	105.41	Luke Humphries	Won
Luke Littler (4)	SF	105.35	Ryan Searle	Won
Luke Humphries	4	103.07	Kevin Doets	Won
Justin Hood	2	103.01	Danny Noppert	Won
Gian van Veen (3)	SF	102.99	Gary Anderson	Won
Gary Anderson (2)	SF	102.91	Gian van Veen	Lost
William O'Connor	1	102.36	Krzysztof Kciuk	Won
Ryan Searle	3	102.29	Martin Schindler	Won
Danny Noppert	2	102.27	Justin Hood	Lost
Gary Anderson (3)	3	102.24	Jermaine Wattimena	Won
Luke Littler (5)	1	101.54	Darius Labanauskas	Won
Gabriel Clemens	3	101.49	Luke Humphries	Lost
Josh Rock	2	101.32	Joe Comito	Won
Justin Hood (2)	4	101.18	Josh Rock	Won
Luke Humphries (2)	QF	101.12	Gian van Veen	Lost
Wessel Nijman	1	100.91	Karel Sedláček	Won
Ryan Searle (2)	4	100.57	James Hurrell	Won
Michael van Gerwen	2	100.20	William O'Connor	Won
Luke Humphries (3)	3	100.14	Gabriel Clemens	Won
Luke Littler (6)	QF	100.04	Krzysztof Ratajski	Won

=== Highest checkouts ===
The maximum checkout of 170 was hit 17 times throughout the tournament, achieved by 13 different players.

- Gian van Veen (×3) (vs. Alan Soutar, Luke Humphries and Gary Anderson)
- Nathan Aspinall (×2) (vs. Lourence Ilagan and Kevin Doets)
- Luke Littler (×2) (vs. Krzysztof Ratajski and Gian van Veen)
- Gary Anderson (vs. Gian van Veen)
- Gabriel Clemens (vs. Alex Spellman)
- Rob Cross (vs. Cor Dekker)
- Joe Cullen (vs. Mensur Suljović)
- Brendan Dolan (vs. Tavis Dudeney)
- Dirk van Duijvenbode (vs. Andy Baetens)
- Luke Humphries (vs. Gabriel Clemens)
- Krzysztof Ratajski (vs. Alexis Toylo)
- Ryan Searle (vs. Luke Littler)
- James Wade (vs. Ricky Evans)
