= David Munyua =

Kenyan darts player (born 1995)

Personal information
- Nickname: Why Not?
- Born: 25 October 1995 (age 30) Murang'a, Kenya

Sport
- Sport: Darts
- Playing since: 2022
- Laterality: Right-handed
- Walk-on music: "Mwaki" by Zerb featuring Sofiya Nzau

Organisation (see split in darts)
- PDC: 2025–

PDC premier events – best performances
- World Championship: Last 64: 2026

David Munyua (born 25 October 1995) is a Kenyan darts player who competes in Professional Darts Corporation (PDC) events. Nicknamed "Why Not?", Munyua made his PDC World Darts Championship debut at the 2026 event as the first Kenyan to play in the tournament. He won his first-round match with a 3–2 comeback victory over world number 18 Mike De Decker, which has been described as one of the biggest shocks in World Darts Championship history.

== Darts career ==
Munyua began playing darts in 2022.

Munyua qualified for the 2026 PDC World Darts Championship through the African Darts Group qualifier, which he won by defeating Cameron Carolissen 8–6 in the final, becoming the first ever player from Kenya to qualify for the PDC World Darts Championship. In the first round, Munyua faced 2024 World Grand Prix champion and world number 18 Mike De Decker, in a match where De Decker was the heavy favourite. De Decker won the first two sets, but Munyua won three consecutive sets, including hitting a 135 checkout, to win the match 3–2. The match has been described as one of the biggest shocks in the history of the World Championship. Munyua exited the tournament following a 3–0 loss to Kevin Doets in the second round.

In September 2026, Munyua qualified for the 2027 PDC World Darts Championship after winning the Northern African qualifiers. He defeated fellow Kenyan player Evans Njuguna 8–7 in the final, reaching the World Championship for the second year in a row.

== Personal life ==
Munyua was born on 25 October 1995, in Murang'a, and was raised there. Outside of darts, Munyua works as a veterinarian in Nairobi. He had never been outside of Africa until he travelled to England for the 2026 PDC World Championship. Munyua explained that his nickname, "Why Not?", is his response when he is challenged to achieve something ambitious.

== World Championship results ==
=== PDC ===
- 2026: Second round (lost to Kevin Doets 0–3) (sets)

== Performance timeline ==
Tournament	2026
PDC Ranked televised events
World Championship	2R
Career statistics
Season-end ranking	
