= 2026 Players Championship Finals =

2026 Ladbrokes Players Championship Finals

Tournament information
- Dates: 27–29 November 2026
- Venue: Butlin's Minehead
- Location: Minehead, England
- Organisation(s): Professional Darts Corporation (PDC)
- Format: Legs
- Prize fund: £750,000
- Winner's share: £130,000

The 2026 Players Championship Finals (known for sponsorship reasons as the 2026 Ladbrokes Players Championship Finals) is an upcoming professional darts tournament that is scheduled to take place at the Butlin's Resort in Minehead, England, from 27 to 29 November 2026. It will be the 19th staging of the Players Championship Finals by the Professional Darts Corporation (PDC). The total prize fund will be an increased total of £750,000, with the winner receiving £130,000.

Sponsored by Ladbrokes, the tournament will be the last PDC event before the 2027 PDC World Darts Championship. It will be the last version of the event to feature the top 64 players based on ranking money earned in the 34 Players Championship events that were held as part of the 2026 PDC Pro Tour, with the 2027 version of the event increasing to the top 128.

Luke Littler was the reigning champion, having defeated Nathan Aspinall 11–8 in the 2025 final. However, Littler failed to qualify for the tournament and will therefore not defend his title.

== Overview ==
=== Background ===
The 2026 Players Championship Finals will take place from 27 to 29 November 2026 at the Butlin's Resort in Minehead, England. British gambling company Ladbrokes continued its sponsorship of the event after becoming title sponsor in 2024. Luke Littler won the 2025 final by defeating Nathan Aspinall 11–8 to win the title for the first time.

=== Format ===
The 64-player field will be seeded based on the Players Championship Order of Merit, a ranking comprising prize money won in Players Championship events during the year. All matches will be in leg play format, with the number of legs required to win increasing as the tournament progresses.

- First round and second round: Best of 11 legs
- Third round and quarter-finals: Best of 19 legs
- Semi-finals and final: Best of 21 legs

=== Prize money ===
The prize fund for the event increased to £750,000, up from the previous year's total of £600,000. The winner will receive £130,000. The prize money breakdown is shown below.

Position (no. of players)		Prize money (Total: £750,000)
Winner	(1)	£130,000
Runner-up	(1)	£70,000
Semi-finalists	(2)	£40,000
Quarter-finalists	(4)	£27,500
Last 16 (third round)	(8)	£15,000
Last 32 (second round)	(16)	£7,000
Last 64 (first round)	(32)	£4,000

== Qualification ==
The 2026 Players Championship series is being held as part of the 2026 PDC Pro Tour and consists of 34 events. Following the final event of the season, the top 64 players on the Players Championship Order of Merit will qualify for the tournament.

Reigning champion Luke Littler failed to finish inside the top 64 of the Players Championship Order of Merit after withdrawing from the final Players Championship events of the season, meaning he will not defend his title. Last year's runner-up Nathan Aspinall also failed to qualify.

=== Top 64 in the Players Championship Order of Merit ===
The following players qualified for the tournament:

1. Wessel Nijman (NED)
2. Chris Dobey (ENG)
3. Kevin Doets (NED)
4. Luke Woodhouse (ENG)
5. Jermaine Wattimena (NED)
6. Andrew Gilding (ENG)
7. Luke Humphries (ENG)
8. Beau Greaves (ENG)
9. Ross Smith (ENG)
10. Danny Noppert (NED)
11. Karel Sedláček (CZE)
12. William O'Connor (IRL)
13. Sebastian Białecki (POL)
14. Dirk van Duijvenbode (NED)
15. Cristo Reyes (ESP)
16. Charlie Manby (ENG)
17. Cameron Menzies (SCO)
18. Michael van Gerwen (NED)
19. Maik Kuivenhoven (NED)
20. Jeffrey de Graaf (SWE)
21. Tommy Morris (ENG)
22. Rob Cross (ENG)
23. Jonny Clayton (WAL)
24. Niels Zonneveld (NED)
25. Tom Bissell (ENG)
26. Krzysztof Ratajski (POL)
27. Kim Huybrechts (BEL)
28. Ryan Searle (ENG)
29. Stephen Bunting (ENG)
30. James Wade (ENG)
31. Richard Veenstra (NED)
32. Gabriel Clemens (GER)
33. Dave Chisnall (ENG)
34. Joe Cullen (ENG)
35. Justin Hood (ENG)
36. Max Hopp (GER)
37. Brendan Dolan (IRL)
38. Joe Hunt (ENG)
39. Damon Heta (AUS)
40. Rob Owen (WAL)
41. Niko Springer (GER)
42. Tom Sykes (ENG)
43. Mickey Mansell (IRL)
44. Callan Rydz (ENG)
45. Gian van Veen (NED)
46. Daryl Gurney (NIR)
47. Connor Scutt (ENG)
48. Mensur Suljović (AUT)
49. Martin Schindler (GER)
50. Darius Labanauskas (LTU)
51. Alan Soutar (SCO)
52. Gerwyn Price (WAL)
53. James Hurrell (ENG)
54. Gary Anderson (SCO)
55. Scott Williams (ENG)
56. Michael Smith (ENG)
57. Christian Kist (NED)
58. Darryl Pilgrim (ENG)
59. Bradley Brooks (ENG)
60. Keane Barry (IRL)
61. Alexander Merkx (NED)
62. Ritchie Edhouse (ENG)
63. Mike De Decker (BEL)
64. Henry Coates (ENG)

== Draw ==
There was no draw held as all players were put in a fixed bracket by their seeding positions. The tournament bracket was confirmed following Players Championship 34 on 5 November. Numbers to the left of a player's name show the seedings for the 64 players in the tournament. Figures to the right of a player's name state their three-dart average in a match. Players in bold denote match winners.

=== Finals ===
**Quarter-finals** (best of 19 legs); 29 November

**Semi-finals** (best of 21 legs); 29 November

**Final** (best of 21 legs); 29 November

=== Top half ===
==== Section 1 ====
**First round** (best of 11 legs); 27 November
1	Wessel Nijman
64	Henry Coates
32	Gabriel Clemens
33	Dave Chisnall
16	Charlie Manby
49	Martin Schindler
17	Cameron Menzies
48	Mensur Suljović
8	Beau Greaves
57	Christian Kist
25	Tom Bissell
40	Robert Owen
9	Ross Smith
56	Michael Smith
24	Niels Zonneveld
41	Niko Springer

**Second round** (best of 11 legs); 28 November
(England)

**Third round** (best of 19 legs); 28 November

**Quarter-finals** (best of 19 legs); 29 November

==== Section 2 ====
**First round** (best of 11 legs); 27 November
4	Luke Woodhouse
61	Alexander Merkx
29	Stephen Bunting
36	Max Hopp
13	Sebastian Białecki
52	Gerwyn Price
20	Jeffrey de Graaf
45	Gian van Veen
5	Jermaine Wattimena
60	Keane Barry
28	Ryan Searle
37	Brendan Dolan
12	William O'Connor
53	James Hurrell
21	Tommy Morris
44	Callan Rydz

**Second round** (best of 11 legs); 28 November
(England)

**Third round** (best of 19 legs); 28 November

**Quarter-finals** (best of 19 legs); 29 November

=== Bottom half ===
==== Section 3 ====
**First round** (best of 11 legs); 27 November
2	Chris Dobey
63	Mike De Decker
31	Richard Veenstra
34	Joe Cullen
15	Cristo Reyes
50	Darius Labanauskas
18	Michael van Gerwen
47	Connor Scutt
7	Luke Humphries
58	Darryl Pilgrim
26	Krzysztof Ratajski
39	Damon Heta
10	Danny Noppert
55	Scott Williams
23	Jonny Clayton
42	Tom Sykes

**Second round** (best of 11 legs); 28 November
(England)

**Third round** (best of 19 legs); 28 November

**Quarter-finals** (best of 19 legs); 29 November

==== Section 4 ====
**First round** (best of 11 legs); 27 November
3	Kevin Doets
62	Ritchie Edhouse
30	James Wade
35	Justin Hood
14	Dirk van Duijvenbode
51	Alan Soutar
19	Maik Kuivenhoven
46	Daryl Gurney
6	Andrew Gilding
59	Bradley Brooks
27	Kim Huybrechts
38	Joe Hunt
11	Karel Sedláček
54	Gary Anderson
22	Rob Cross
43	Mickey Mansell

**Second round** (best of 11 legs); 28 November
(England)
(England)

**Third round** (best of 19 legs); 28 November

**Quarter-finals** (best of 19 legs); 29 November
