= Tytus Kanik =

Polish darts player (born 1984)

Personal information
- Nickname: "Tito"
- Born: 17 May 1984 (age 42) Poznań, Poland

Sport
- Sport: Darts
- Playing since: 2014
- Darts: 22g Bull's
- Laterality: Right-handed
- Walk-on music: "Back in Black" by AC/DC

Organisation (see split in darts)
- BDO: 2016–2017
- PDC: 2015–2020; 2023–present (Tour Card: 2018–2019; 2025–present)
- WDF: 2016–2017, 2022–2024
- Current world ranking: (PDC) 129 ▼1 (29 October 2026)

WDF major events – best performances
- World Masters: Last 64: 2017

PDC premier events – best performances
- UK Open: Last 128: 2019

Other tournament wins
- Years
Polish Championship	2017, 2022
Medal record
Men's Darts
Representing Poland
EDF European Championship
Silver medal – second place	2018 Podčetrtek	Men's doubles
Bronze medal – third place	2019 Podčetrtek	Men's cricket
Bronze medal – third place	2024 Podčetrtek	Men's cricket

Tytus Kanik (born 17 May 1984) is a Polish professional darts player and former pool player who competes in Professional Darts Corporation (PDC) events. He is a two-time Polish Champion and was the first player from Poland to gain a PDC Tour Card and become professional.

== Career ==
He achieved his first sports success in pool games. In 2003, he won a bronze medal in the eight-ball Polish Billiards Championships. He also started playing darts around the same period, ultimately changing the sports discipline before 2014.

Very good performances at the national area, including plays in the final of the 2014 Polish Championship, where he lost to Krzysztof Chmielewski, allowed him to gain an official invitation to the 2015 PDC World Cup of Darts where he represented Poland together with Mariusz Paul, another leading player in the country at this time. In the first round of this tournament they faced the representation of Ireland, composed of William O'Connor and Connie Finnan and lost 0–5 in legs. In the first half of 2016, he advanced to the final of the Polish Championship for the second time, where he lost to Krzysztof Ratajski. Appearance in that phase of this tournament allowed him to debut in the 2016 Winmau World Masters, where he lost 0–3 in sets to Neil Duff in the second round match.

In May 2017, he became the Polish Champion for the first time, defeating Paweł Wołynka in the final. Victory in this tournament and numerous successes in the other national competitions resulted in his second invitation at 2017 PDC World Cup of Darts. This time he represented Poland together with Ratajski. Yet again, they played in first round with Ireland, this time composed of William O'Connor and Mick McGowan, and were defeated 3–5 in legs. At the end of September 2017, he played at 2017 Winmau World Masters, where he reached third round, beating Scott Robertson and Matthew Dicken. In third round match he lost 0–3 in sets to James Russell.

In January 2018, he became the first Polish player to gain a two-year PDC Tour Card. He won the third day of European Q-School by defeating José Justicia 5–3 in the final. The following week, he won the qualifying tournaments for the first two PDC European Tour events of the year. Two months later he played at 2018 European Darts Open, beating Jan Dekker 6–3 in the first round. The next day, he lost 2–6 to Simon Whitlock in the second round. In April 2018, he played at 2018 German Darts Open, where he was eliminated in the first round match, losing 2–6 to James Wade. At the beginning of June 2018, he played in the 2018 PDC World Cup of Darts with Ratajski. After a very even duel, the Poles lost 4–5 in legs to Northern Ireland representing by Brendan Dolan and Daryl Gurney.

In early March 2019, he made his debut in the 2019 UK Open, where he lost 0–6 to Yordi Meeuwisse in the second round match. Later that month, he played at 2019 German Darts Championship, where he lost 4–6 to Jamie Hughes in the first round. In May 2019, he played at 2019 Austrian Darts Open where he advanced first time to the third round phase, beating Dietmar Burger and Jonny Clayton. In the third round match he lost 5–6 to Peter Wright.

In June 2019, he played in the 2019 PDC World Cup of Darts again with Ratajski. Poland defeated the Czech Republic 5–2 in legs. In the second round they faced the Netherlands. Kanik faced Jermaine Wattimena and lost 1–4 in legs. As this followed the loss of Ratajski in the first second round match against Michael van Gerwen, Poland was eliminated. Due to the lack of outstanding results, Kanik lost his tour card at the end of the season. His best achievement in the Players Championship was a semi-finals at the tenth tournament in April 2019, where he lost to Gabriel Clemens.

In the next season, after losing his professional card, in October 2020 he played in the 2020 International Darts Open. In the first round match he faced Martin Schindler from the host country. The match ended with Kanik's defeat 1–6 in legs. In July 2022, for the second time in his career he became the Polish Champion, beating Sebastian Białecki 5–3 in legs. Victory in this tournament guaranteed him a start in the 2022 WDF Europe Cup. It markes his debut in this competition.

== Performance timeline ==
Tytus Kaink's performance timeline is as follows:

=== BDO/WDF ===
Tournament	2016	2017	2024
BDO/WDF Ranked televised events
World Masters	2R	3R	2R

=== PDC ===
Tournament	2015	2017	2018	2019	2025
PDC Ranked televised events
UK Open	Non-PDC		DNQ	2R	1R
PDC Non-ranked televised events
World Cup	1R	1R	1R	2R	DNQ
Career statistics
Year-end ranking (PDC)	NR		110	92	

==== PDC European Tour ====
Season	1	2	3	4	5	6	7	8	9	10	11	12	13	14
2018	EDO; 2R	GDG; DNQ	GDO; 1R	Did not qualify										
2019	EDO; DNQ	GDC; 1R	GDG; DNQ	GDO; DNQ	ADO; 3R	Did not qualify								
2020	Did not qualify			IDO; 1R										
2023	Did not qualify			GDG; 1R	Did not qualify									
2025	Did not qualify								BSD; 1R	Did not qualify				

==== PDC Players Championships ====
Season	1	2	3	4	5	6	7	8	9	10	11	12	13	14	15	16	17	18	19	20	21	22	23	24	25	26	27	28	29	30	31	32	33	34
2018	BAR; 2R	BAR; 3R	BAR; 2R	BAR; 2R	MIL; 2R	MIL; 1R	BAR; 3R	BAR; 2R	WIG; 1R	WIG; 2R	MIL; 1R	MIL; 1R	WIG; 1R	WIG; 2R	BAR; 1R	BAR; 1R	BAR; 1R	BAR; 2R	DUB; 2R	DUB; 1R	BAR; 1R	BAR; 1R												
2019	WIG; 2R	WIG; 1R	WIG; 3R	WIG; 1R	BAR; 1R	BAR; 2R	WIG; 1R	WIG; 1R	BAR; 1R	BAR; SF	BAR; 3R	BAR; 1R	BAR; 2R	BAR; 2R	BAR; 1R	BAR; 2R	WIG; 1R	WIG; 1R	BAR; 1R	BAR; 2R	HIL; 2R	HIL; 1R	BAR; 1R	BAR; 2R	BAR; 1R	BAR; 1R	DUB; 2R	DUB; 2R	BAR; 1R	BAR; 1R				
2025	WIG; 1R	WIG; 1R	ROS; 3R	ROS; 1R	LEI; 1R	LEI; 1R	HIL; 1R	HIL; 2R	LEI; 2R	LEI; 1R	LEI; 1R	LEI; 1R	ROS; 1R	ROS; 1R	HIL; 1R	HIL; 3R	LEI; 1R	LEI; 1R	LEI; 1R	LEI; 1R	LEI; 1R	HIL; 1R	HIL; 1R	MIL; 1R	MIL; 2R	HIL; 1R	HIL; 2R	LEI; 1R	LEI; 1R	LEI; 1R	WIG; 1R	WIG; 1R	WIG; 1R	WIG; 2R
2026	HIL; 1R	HIL; 2R	WIG; 1R	WIG; 1R	LEI; 1R	LEI; 1R	LEI; 1R	LEI; 3R	WIG; 1R	WIG; 1R	MIL; 1R	MIL; 1R	HIL; 1R	HIL; 1R	LEI; 1R	LEI; 1R	LEI; 1R	LEI; 1R	MIL; 1R	MIL; 1R	WIG; 1R	WIG; 2R	LEI; 1R	LEI; 1R	HIL; 1R	HIL; 1R	LEI; 1R	LEI; 1R	ROS; 1R	ROS; 1R	ROS; 1R	ROS; 1R	LEI; 1R	LEI; 1R

Performance Table Legend
W	Won the tournament	F	Finalist	SF	Semifinalist	QF	Quarterfinalist	#R; RR; Prel.	Lost in # round Round-robin; Preliminary round	DQ	Disqualified
DNQ	Did not qualify	DNP	Did not participate	WD	Withdrew	NH	Tournament not held	#R; RR; Prel.	Lost in # round Round-robin; Preliminary round	NYF	Not yet founded
