= Cor Dekker =

Norwegian darts player (born 1987)

Personal information
- Nickname: "The Sheriff"
- Born: 9 October 1987 (age 39) Bovenkarspel, Netherlands
- Home town: Askim, Norway

Sport
- Sport: Darts
- Playing since: 2008
- Darts: 23g Bull's Signature
- Laterality: Right-handed
- Walk-on music: "Paradise City" by Guns N' Roses

Organisation (see split in darts)
- PDC: 2016–2019; 2024–present (Tour Card: 2025–present)
- Current world ranking: (PDC) 77 (29 October 2026)

WDF major events – best performances
- World Masters: Last 272: 2015

PDC premier events – best performances
- World Championship: Last 128: 2026
- UK Open: Last 160: 2025
- World Series Finals: Last 32: 2025

Other tournament wins
- Years
PDC Nordic & Baltic Pro Tour	2018, 2026 (x2)

Cor Dekker (born 9 October 1987) is a Dutch-born Norwegian professional darts player who competes in Professional Darts Corporation (PDC) events. He has won three titles on the PDC Nordic & Baltic Tour. He reached his first PDC European Tour semi-final at the Swiss Darts Trophy on the 2025 PDC Pro Tour.

== Career ==
Dekker partnered with Robert Wagner in the 2016 PDC World Cup of Darts, and after beating Gibraltar in the first round, they took on the Scotland team of Gary Anderson and Robert Thornton. After taking Anderson to a last-leg decider in the singles, Dekker needed 52 to win, but Anderson took out a 160 checkout to win the match.

Dekker made his PDC European Tour debut on the 2019 Austrian Darts Championship, but lost to Dietmar Burger in the first round 6–3. He then qualified for the 2019 Gibraltar Darts Trophy, where he lost 6–5 to Dyson Parody, after being 5–2 up and missing multiple match darts.

Dekker hit a perfect nine-dart finish against Stephen Bunting in the second round of the 2024 Hungarian Darts Trophy on 21 September, although he would ultimately go on to lose the match 2–6.

In January 2025, Dekker gained a Tour Card at Q-School by finishing first on the European Q-School Order of Merit. He is the first Norwegian to achieve this.

== World Championship results ==
=== PDC ===
- 2026: First round (lost to Rob Cross 0–3)

== Performance timeline ==
Tournament	2016	2019	2024	2025	2026
PDC Ranked televised events
World Championship	DNQ				1R
PDC World Masters	DNQ			Prel.	Prel.
UK Open	DNQ			1R	2R
PDC Non-ranked televised events
PDC World Cup of Darts	2R	DNQ	RR	RR	2R
World Series Finals	DNQ			1R	DNQ
Career statistics
Season-end ranking (PDC)	NR	182	173	94	

=== PDC European Tour ===
Season	1	2	3	4	5	6	7	8	9	10	11	12	13	14	15
2019	Did not qualify									ADC; 1R	DNQ		GDT; 1R		
2024	DNQ		IDO; 1R	Did not qualify							HDT; 2R	DNQ			
2025	Did not qualify										CDO; 1R	HDT; DNQ	SDT; SF	GDC; DNQ	
2026	DNQ			GDG; 1R	Did not qualify										

=== PDC Players Championships ===
Season	1	2	3	4	5	6	7	8	9	10	11	12	13	14	15	16	17	18	19	20	21	22	23	24	25	26	27	28	29	30	31	32	33	34
2025	WIG; 1R	WIG; 1R	ROS; 2R	ROS; 3R	LEI; 1R	LEI; 2R	HIL; 1R	HIL; 1R	LEI; 1R	LEI; 2R	LEI; 1R	LEI; 1R	ROS; 1R	ROS; 1R	HIL; 1R	HIL; 1R	LEI; 1R	LEI; 1R	LEI; 1R	LEI; DNP		HIL; 1R	HIL; 1R	MIL; 2R	MIL; 4R	HIL; 2R	HIL; 4R	LEI; 1R	LEI; 1R	LEI; 2R	WIG; 1R	WIG; 4R	WIG; 3R	WIG; 1R
2026	HIL; 2R	HIL; 3R	WIG; 1R	WIG; 3R	LEI; 2R	LEI; 2R	LEI; 2R	LEI; 1R	WIG; 2R	WIG; 1R	MIL; 1R	MIL; 3R	HIL; 2R	HIL; 2R	LEI; 1R	LEI; 2R	LEI; 1R	LEI; 1R	MIL; 2R	MIL; 1R	WIG; 1R	WIG; 1R	LEI; 3R	LEI; 1R	HIL; 1R	HIL; 2R	LEI; 1R	LEI; 1R	ROS; 4R	ROS; 1R	ROS; 1R	ROS; 1R	LEI; 1R	LEI; 1R

Performance Table Legend
W	Won the tournament	F	Finalist	SF	Semifinalist	QF	Quarterfinalist	#R; RR; Prel.	Lost in # round Round-robin; Preliminary round	DQ	Disqualified
DNQ	Did not qualify	DNP	Did not participate	WD	Withdrew	NH	Tournament not held	#R; RR; Prel.	Lost in # round Round-robin; Preliminary round	NYF	Not yet founded
