= 2025 Swiss Darts Trophy =

Tournament information
- Dates: 26–28 September 2025
- Venue: St. Jakobshalle
- Location: Basel, Switzerland
- Organisation(s): Professional Darts Corporation (PDC)
- Format: Legs
- Prize fund: £175,000
- Winner's share: £30,000
- High checkout: 170 Gian van Veen

Champion(s)
- Stephen Bunting (ENG)

The 2025 Swiss Darts Trophy was the thirteenth of fourteen PDC European Tour events on the 2025 PDC Pro Tour. The tournament took place at the St. Jakobshalle in Basel, Switzerland, from 26 to 28 September 2025. It featured a field of 48 players and £175,000 in prize money, with £30,000 going to the winner. It was the final event before the cut-off date for World Grand Prix qualification.

Martin Schindler was the defending champion after defeating Ryan Searle 8–7 in the 2024 final. However, he was beaten 6–3 by Jonny Clayton in the third round.

Stephen Bunting won the tournament, his second European Tour title, by defeating Luke Woodhouse 8–3 in the final.

== Prize money ==
The prize fund remained at £175,000, with £30,000 to the winner:

Stage (num. of players)		Prize money
Winner	(1)	£30,000
Runner-up	(1)	£12,000
Semi-finalists	(2)	£8,500
Quarter-finalists	(4)	£6,000
Third round losers	(8)	£4,000
Second round losers	(16)	£2,500*
First round losers	(16)	£1,250*
Total	£175,000	

- Pre-qualified players from the Orders of Merit who lose in their first match of the event shall not be credited with prize money on any Order of Merit. A player who qualifies as a qualifier, but later becomes a seed due to the withdrawal of one or more other players shall be credited with their prize money on all Orders of Merit regardless of how far they progress in the event.

== Qualification and format ==
In a change from the previous year, the top 16 on the two-year main PDC Order of Merit ranking were seeded and entered the tournament in the second round, while the 16 qualifiers from the one-year PDC Pro Tour Order of Merit ranking entered in the first round. In another change, the 16 Pro Tour Order of Merit qualifiers were drawn against one of the 16 other qualifiers in the first round.

The seedings were confirmed on 5 September. The remaining 16 places went to players from four qualifying events – 10 from the Tour Card Holder Qualifier (held on 11 September), four from the Host Nation Qualifier (held on 25 September), one from the Nordic & Baltic Associate Member Qualifier (held on 1 August), and one from the East European Associate Member Qualifier (held on 10 August).

Michael van Gerwen, Gary Anderson, Gerwyn Price and Cameron Menzies withdrew and were replaced by Richard Veenstra, Connor Scutt, Mensur Suljović and Chris Landman. Gian van Veen, Mike De Decker and Ryan Searle moved up into the seeded positions as 14th, 15th and 16th seeds respectively.

The following players took part in the tournament:

Seeded Players

1. Luke Humphries (third round)
2. Stephen Bunting (champion)
3. James Wade (second round)
4. Jonny Clayton (quarter-finals)
5. Chris Dobey (third round)
6. Rob Cross (quarter-finals)
7. Damon Heta (second round)
8. Josh Rock (second round)
9. Dave Chisnall (second round)
10. ~~Ross Smith~~ (withdrew)
11. Danny Noppert (third round)
12. Peter Wright (second round)
13. Martin Schindler (third round)
14. Gian van Veen (semi-finals)
15. Mike De Decker (second round)
16. Ryan Searle (quarter-finals)

Pro Tour Order of Merit Qualifiers
- Wessel Nijman (first round)
- Nathan Aspinall (second round)
- Jermaine Wattimena (third round)
- Dirk van Duijvenbode (second round)
- Daryl Gurney (first round)
- Luke Woodhouse (runner-up)
- Andrew Gilding (first round)
- Ryan Joyce (third round)
- Raymond van Barneveld (quarter-finals)
- Ricardo Pietreczko (second round)
- Niels Zonneveld (second round)
- Krzysztof Ratajski (third round)

Tour Card Qualifier
- Niko Springer (first round)
- Owen Bates (first round)
- Oskar Lukasiak (first round)
- Ritchie Edhouse (third round)
- Cor Dekker (semi-finals)
- Martin Lukeman (first round)
- Lukas Wenig (first round)
- William O'Connor (second round)
- Callan Rydz (second round)
- Jitse van der Wal (first round)

Host Nation Qualifier
- Stefan Bellmont (first round)
- Ansh Sood (first round)
- Denis Schnetzer (first round)
- Rocco Fulciniti (first round)

Nordic & Baltic Qualifier
- Andreas Toft Jørgensen (first round)

East European Qualifier
- Dalibor Šmolík (first round)

Reserve List
- Richard Veenstra (second round)
- Connor Scutt (first round)
- Mensur Suljović (second round)
- Chris Landman (second round)

== Summary ==
=== First round ===
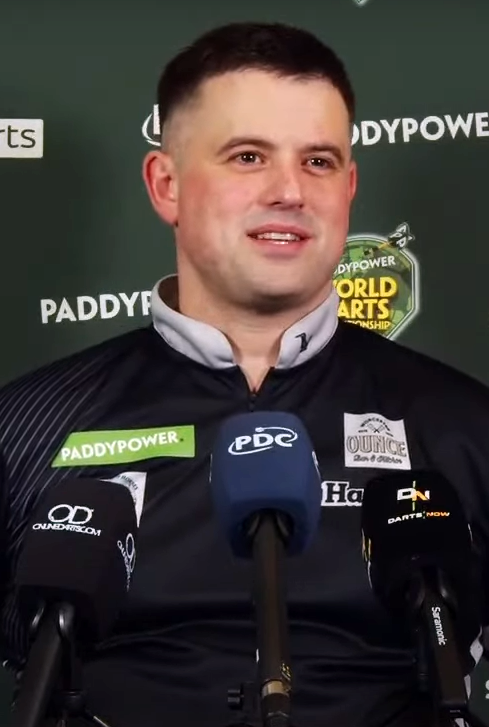
Luke Woodhouse (pictured in 2024) overturned a 3–0 deficit in the first round before reaching the final of the event.

The first round was played on Friday 26 September. Hungarian Darts Trophy champion Niko Springer was eliminated in a deciding leg by Richard Veenstra, who hit a 156 checkout in the penultimate leg before winning the match 6–5. Nathan Aspinall and Krzysztof Ratajski achieved whitewash wins over Andreas Toft Jørgensen and Owen Bates respectively. All four Swiss qualifiers were unsuccessful: Rocco Fulciniti lost 6–0 to Ryan Joyce, Denis Schnetzer lost 6–3 to Chris Landman, Ansh Sood lost 6–3 to Raymond van Barneveld and Stefan Bellmont lost 6–1 to Jermaine Wattimena. Callan Rydz progressed to the second round with a 6–1 victory over Connor Scutt to set up a tie against world number one Luke Humphries, while William O'Connor averaged over 102 to defeat Daryl Gurney by the same scoreline. Luke Woodhouse came back from 3–0 down to defeat Lukas Wenig 6–5.

=== Second round ===
The second round was played on Saturday 27 September. Ross Smith withdrew from the tournament on Friday evening for family reasons, meaning reigning European champion Ritchie Edhouse received a bye to the third round. Luke Woodhouse recorded the highest three-dart average in tournament history, averaging 110.69 to defeat Dave Chisnall 6–1. Luke Humphries and Stephen Bunting, the top two seeds for the event, advanced to the second round with victories over Callan Rydz and Chris Landman, while James Wade and Josh Rock suffered early exits at the hands of Ryan Joyce and Jermaine Wattimena. Danny Noppert won a deciding leg against William O'Connor to end O'Connor's chances of qualifying for the World Grand Prix, as Krzysztof Ratajski confirmed his place with a 6–5 victory over Mike De Decker and Raymond van Barneveld improved his chances by beating Damon Heta by the same scoreline. Jonny Clayton averaged almost 106 in defeating Nathan Aspinall 6–4, Cor Dekker reached the final day of a European Tour event for the first time by beating Peter Wright 6–3, and Gian van Veen whitewashed compatriot Dirk van Duijvenbode 6–0; Van Veen hit a 170 checkout during his win. Defending champion Martin Schindler also progressed, defeating fellow German player Ricardo Pietreczko 6–2 to set up a tie against Clayton.

=== Final day ===
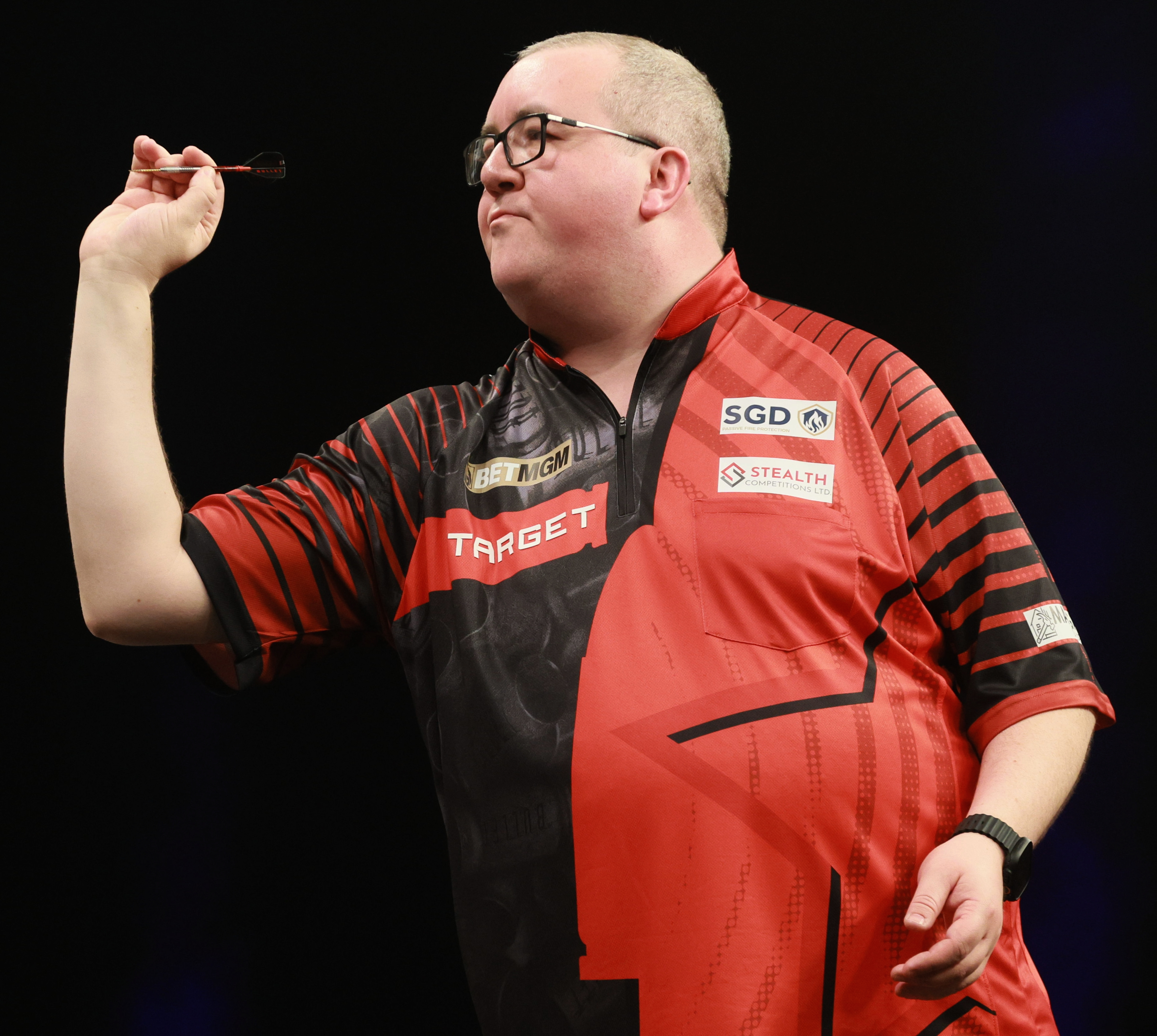
Stephen Bunting (pictured) won his second European Tour title and his sixth title of 2025.

The third round, quarter-finals, semi-finals and final were played on Sunday 28 September. The final day saw Luke Woodhouse and Stephen Bunting reach the final. Woodhouse followed victories against Jermaine Wattimena and 2024 runner-up Ryan Searle by ending Cor Dekker's run with a 7–3 win in the semi-finals, progressing to his first European Tour final and second PDC final overall. Bunting joined Woodhouse in the final by defeating Krzysztof Ratajski, Raymond van Barneveld and Gian van Veen, surviving a match dart from Van Veen in his semi-final match. Woodhouse looked to win his first PDC title, while Bunting aimed to win his second European Tour title of the year after winning the International Darts Open in April. Van Barneveld's 6–0 whitewash of Ritchie Edhouse in the third round saw him qualify for the World Grand Prix, eliminating Dave Chisnall from the race.

Bunting missed six doubles in the opening leg of the final but recovered to take a 3–1 lead. Woodhouse won the next leg with a hold of throw. From there, Bunting took full control of the match and extended his advantage to 6–2 before eventually winning 8–3. Bunting ended the match with a three-dart average of almost 104. It was Bunting's second European Tour title and his sixth title of 2025. In his post-match interview, Bunting, the world number four, stated that he was "playing the best darts of [his] life" and that "to be in the top four in the world is an unbelievable achievement". Woodhouse praised his opponent's performance in the final, saying that Bunting "kept [him] under the cosh from the start" before commenting, "Hopefully this year, a first title comes."

== Draw ==
The draw was announced on 25 September. Numbers to the left of a player's name show the seedings for the top 16 in the tournament. The figures to the right of a player's name state their three-dart average in a match. Players in bold denote match winners.

**First round** (best of 11 legs); 26 September
Connor Scutt 94.68	1
**Callan Rydz 100.47**	**6**
**Niels Zonneveld 93.04**	**6**
Dalibor Šmolík 90.40	3
**Jermaine Wattimena 90.16**	**6**
Stefan Bellmont 87.14	1
**Luke Woodhouse 93.07**	**6**
Lukas Wenig 89.74	5
**Nathan Aspinall 94.93**	**6**
Andreas Toft Jørgensen 71.27	0
**Ricardo Pietreczko 93.77**	**6**
Oskar Lukasiak 86.27	3
**Mensur Suljović 87.21**	**6**
Martin Lukeman 84.12	2
Andrew Gilding 88.65	3
**Cor Dekker 88.18**	**6**
**Chris Landman 88.99**	**6**
Denis Schnetzer 81.45	3
**Krzysztof Ratajski 91.09**	**6**
Owen Bates 79.44	0
**Raymond van Barneveld 89.41**	**6**
Ansh Sood 81.17	3
Wessel Nijman 87.34	5
**Ritchie Edhouse 89.05**	**6**
**Ryan Joyce 89.29**	**6**
Rocco Fulciniti 73.71	0
**Dirk van Duijvenbode 89.79**	**6**
Jitse van der Wal 89.61	2
**Richard Veenstra 90.79**	**6**
Niko Springer 99.12	5
Daryl Gurney 97.06	1
**William O'Connor 102.24**	**6**

**Second round** (best of 11 legs); 27 September
**1**	**Luke Humphries 100.13**	**6**
Callan Rydz 86.65	2
**16**	**Ryan Searle 101.14**	**6**
Niels Zonneveld 102.00	3
8	Josh Rock 91.06	1
**Jermaine Wattimena 107.35**	**6**
9	Dave Chisnall 97.20	2
**Luke Woodhouse 110.69**	**6**
**4**	**Jonny Clayton 105.33**	**6**
Nathan Aspinall 95.21	4
**13**	**Martin Schindler 94.19**	**6**
Ricardo Pietreczko 84.68	2
**5**	**Chris Dobey 101.43**	**6**
Mensur Suljović 99.65	4
12	Peter Wright 78.77	3
**Cor Dekker 80.08**	**6**
**2**	**Stephen Bunting 99.18**	**6**
Chris Landman 82.77	3
15	Mike De Decker 97.36	5
**Krzysztof Ratajski 94.03**	**6**
7	Damon Heta 95.47	5
**Raymond van Barneveld 98.79**	**6**
10	Ross Smith	w/d
**Ritchie Edhouse**	**w/o**
3	James Wade 91.73	5
**Ryan Joyce 89.28**	**6**
**14**	**Gian van Veen 102.48**	**6**
Dirk van Duijvenbode 92.85	0
**6**	**Rob Cross 94.61**	**6**
Richard Veenstra 84.71	2
**11**	**Danny Noppert 104.55**	**6**
William O'Connor 93.30	5

**Third round** (best of 11 legs); 28 September
1	Humphries 92.77	4
**16**	**Searle 91.94**	**6**
Wattimena 90.35	2
**Woodhouse 94.49**	**6**
**4**	**Clayton 104.57**	**6**
13	Schindler 100.90	3
5	Dobey 106.99	5
**Dekker 100.07**	**6**
**2**	**Bunting 101.31**	**6**
Ratajski 99.10	3
**van Barneveld 88.41**	**6**
Edhouse 83.41	0
Joyce 87.50	2
**14**	**van Veen 91.59**	**6**
**6**	**Cross 95.63**	**6**
11	Noppert 95.55	5

**Quarter-finals** (best of 11 legs); 28 September
16	Searle 94.30	5
**Woodhouse 94.67**	**6**
4	Clayton 96.25	5
**Dekker 96.04**	**6**
**2**	**Bunting 101.84**	**6**
van Barneveld 83.38	2
**14**	**van Veen 102.43**	**6**
6	Cross 98.64	2

**Semi-finals** (best of 13 legs); 28 September
**Woodhouse 89.64**	**7**
Dekker 89.16	3
**2**	**Bunting 101.44**	**7**
14	van Veen 102.00	6

**Final** (best of 15 legs); 28 September
Woodhouse 94.74	3
**2**	**Bunting 103.90**	**8**
