= 2025 German Darts Championship =

2025 Elten Safety Shoes German Darts Championship

Tournament information
- Dates: 17–19 October 2025
- Venue: Halle 39
- Location: Hildesheim, Germany
- Organisation(s): Professional Darts Corporation (PDC)
- Format: Legs
- Prize fund: £175,000
- Winner's share: £30,000
- Nine-dart finish: Dirk van Duijvenbode
- High checkout: 170 Gian van Veen

Champion(s)
- Nathan Aspinall (ENG)

The 2025 German Darts Championship (known for sponsorship reasons as the 2025 Elten Safety Shoes German Darts Championship) was the fourteenth of fourteen PDC European Tour events on the 2025 PDC Pro Tour. The tournament was held at the Halle 39, Hildesheim, Germany, from 17 to 19 October 2025. It featured a field of 48 players and £175,000 in prize money, with £30,000 going to the winner.

Peter Wright was the defending champion after defeating Luke Littler 8–5 in the 2024 final. However, he lost 6–5 to Dirk van Duijvenbode in the quarter-finals.

Nathan Aspinall won the tournament, his third European Tour title, by defeating Van Duijvenbode 8–6 in the final. Van Duijvenbode hit a nine-dart finish in his first-round win against Karel Sedláček.

== Prize money ==
The prize fund remained at £175,000, with £30,000 to the winner:

Stage (num. of players)		Prize money
Winner	(1)	£30,000
Runner-up	(1)	£12,000
Semi-finalists	(2)	£8,500
Quarter-finalists	(4)	£6,000
Third round losers	(8)	£4,000
Second round losers	(16)	£2,500*
First round losers	(16)	£1,250*
Total	£175,000	

- Pre-qualified players from the Orders of Merit who lose in their first match of the event shall not be credited with prize money on any Order of Merit. A player who qualifies as a qualifier, but later becomes a seed due to the withdrawal of one or more other players shall be credited with their prize money on all Orders of Merit regardless of how far they progress in the event.

== Qualification and format ==
In a change from the previous year, the top 16 on the two-year main PDC Order of Merit ranking were seeded and entered the tournament in the second round, while the 16 qualifiers from the one-year PDC Pro Tour Order of Merit ranking entered in the first round. In another change, the 16 Pro Tour Order of Merit qualifiers were drawn against one of the 16 other qualifiers in the first round.

The seedings were confirmed on 5 September. The remaining 16 places went to players from four qualifying events – 10 from the Tour Card Holder Qualifier (held on 11 September), four from the Host Nation Qualifier (held on 18 May), one from the Nordic & Baltic Associate Member Qualifier (held on 2 August), and one from the East European Associate Member Qualifier (held on 10 August).

Luke Littler withdrew before the Tour Card Qualifier and was replaced by Krzysztof Ratajski from the Pro Tour Order of Merit. Luke Humphries, Michael van Gerwen, Gary Anderson and Callan Rydz withdrew at a later date and were replaced by Gabriel Clemens, Ricky Evans, Jeffrey de Graaf and Keane Barry from the reserve list. Martin Schindler, Gian van Veen, Mike De Decker and Ryan Searle moved up into the seeded positions as 13th, 14th, 15th and 16th seeds respectively.

The following players are taking part in the tournament:

Seeded Players

1. Stephen Bunting (second round)
2. James Wade (second round)
3. Jonny Clayton (third round)
4. Chris Dobey (second round)
5. Rob Cross (second round)
6. Gerwyn Price (third round)
7. Damon Heta (second round)
8. Josh Rock (second round)
9. Dave Chisnall (quarter-finals)
10. Ross Smith (second round)
11. Danny Noppert (quarter-finals)
12. Peter Wright (quarter-finals)
13. Martin Schindler (third round)
14. Gian van Veen (semi-finals)
15. Mike De Decker (second round)
16. Ryan Searle (second round)

Pro Tour Order of Merit Qualifiers
- Wessel Nijman (third round)
- Cameron Menzies (third round)
- Nathan Aspinall (champion)
- Jermaine Wattimena (quarter-finals)
- Dirk van Duijvenbode (runner-up)
- Daryl Gurney (first round)
- Luke Woodhouse (second round)
- Andrew Gilding (first round)
- Ryan Joyce (third round)
- Raymond van Barneveld (second round)
- Ricardo Pietreczko (second round)
- Niels Zonneveld (second round)
- Krzysztof Ratajski (semi-finals)

Tour Card Qualifier
- Karel Sedláček (first round)
- Joe Cullen (first round)
- Tom Bissell (first round)
- Christian Kist (second round)
- Wesley Plaisier (first round)
- Radek Szagański (first round)
- Steve Lennon (third round)
- Justin Hood (first round)
- William O'Connor (second round)
Host Nation Qualifier
- Felix Springer (first round)
- Kevin Troppmann (first round)
- Martin Kramer (first round)
- Maximilian Czerwinski (first round)
Nordic & Baltic Qualifier
- Darius Labanauskas (first round)
East European Qualifier
- Tomislav Rosandić (first round)
Reserve List
- Gabriel Clemens (second round)
- Ricky Evans (third round)
- Jeffrey de Graaf (first round)
- Keane Barry (first round)

== Summary ==
=== First round ===
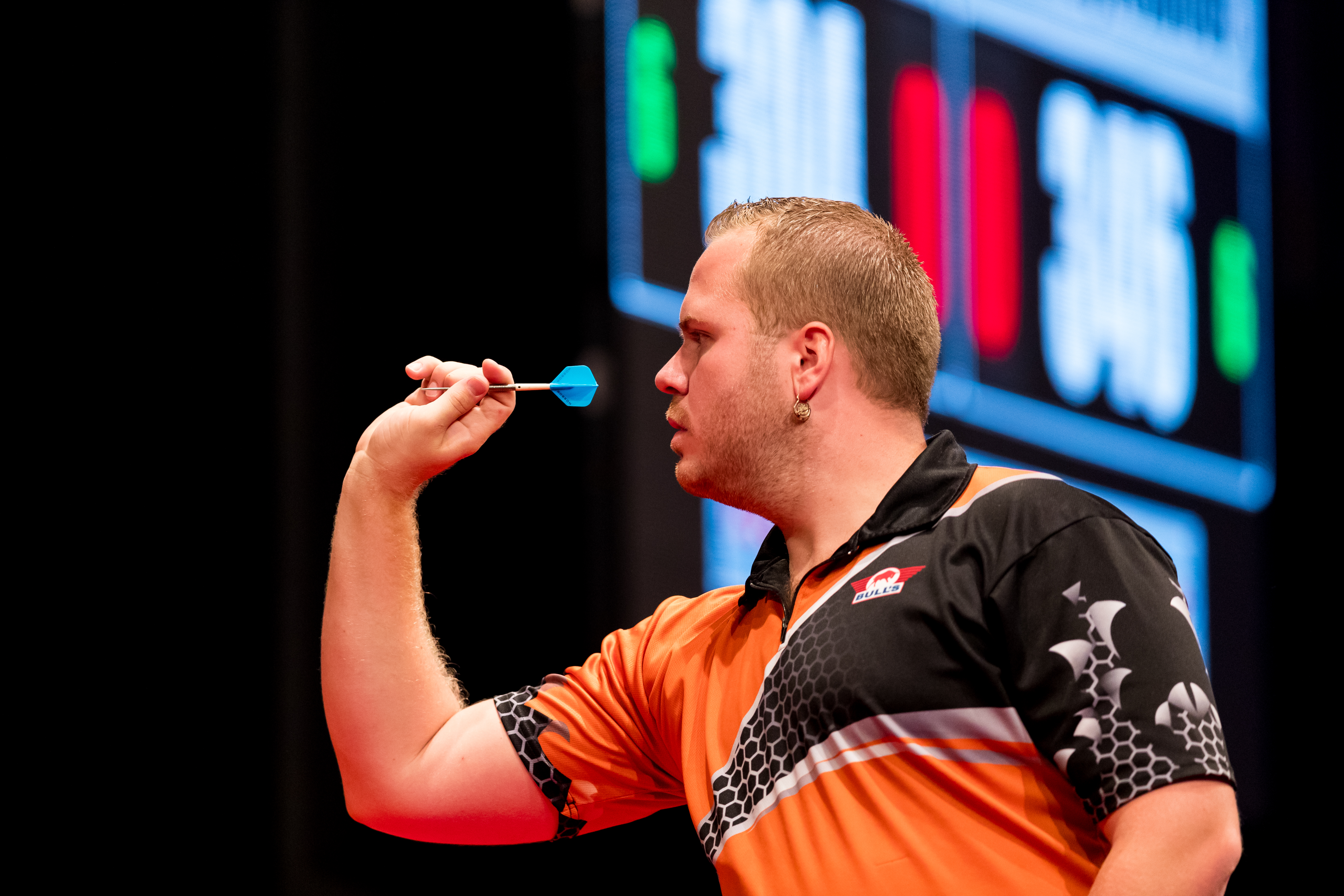
Dirk van Duijvenbode (pictured in 2019) hit a nine-dart finish during his first-round match against Karel Sedláček.

The first round was played on 17 October. Dirk van Duijvenbode produced his first nine-dart finish on stage in the fourth leg of his match against Karel Sedláček, completing a 141 checkout with treble 17, treble 18 and double 18 to seal the leg. Van Duijvenbode went on to win 6–4 with a 135 checkout on the bullseye. "I have hit three nine-darters this year, but I've always wanted to hit one on a stage, because those really count," Van Duijvenbode commented after the match. Nathan Aspinall defeated European Tour debutant Maximilian Czerwinski 6–3 with finishes of 84, 85, 90, 99, 116 and 160. Along with Czerwinski, all Host Nation Qualifiers were eliminated in the first round: Kevin Troppmann lost 6–3 to Raymond van Barneveld, Martin Kramer lost 6–2 to Wessel Nijman and Felix Springer—younger brother of Niko Springer—lost 6–1 to Krzysztof Ratajski.

Joe Cullen missed out on qualifying for the European Championship for the first time in a decade by losing 6–2 to Ricky Evans, while William O'Connor increased his chances of qualifying by defeating Andrew Gilding 6–4. Ricardo Pietreczko beat Radek Szagański 6–3 to advance to a second-round meeting with defending champion Peter Wright. Gabriel Clemens and Steve Lennon registered their first wins of the 2025 European Tour season by defeating Tomislav Rosandić and Jeffrey de Graaf respectively. 2019 champion Daryl Gurney was eliminated in a 6–2 loss to Christian Kist, who won six consecutive legs. Jermaine Wattimena and Ryan Joyce both posted three-dart averages over 100 in their wins over Keane Barry and Justin Hood.

=== Second round ===
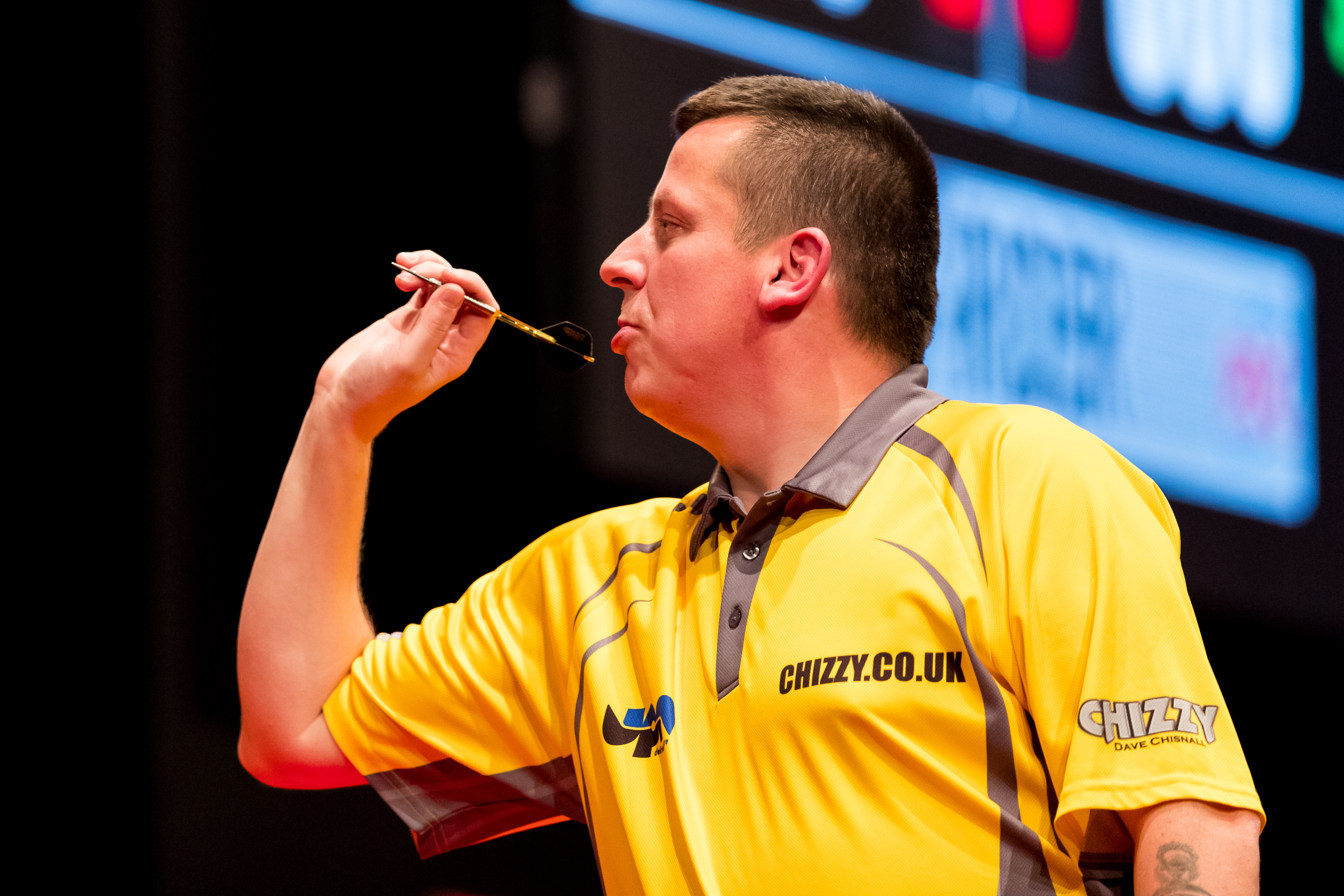
Dave Chisnall (pictured in 2019) defeated Gabriel Clemens in the second round to end a streak of nine consecutive losses on the European Tour.

The second round was played on 18 October. Top seed Stephen Bunting was eliminated in his opening match, losing 6–4 to Ryan Joyce. Defending champion Peter Wright came through a deciding leg against Ricardo Pietreczko, with Wright winning all his six legs in 15 darts. Dirk van Duijvenbode averaged 117.74—his highest three-dart average on stage—on his way to beating Chris Dobey 6–2. Welsh pair Gerwyn Price and Jonny Clayton progressed to the third round with wins over Christian Kist and Raymond van Barneveld respectively, while Nathan Aspinall averaged 107.53 to defeat Ross Smith 6–4. Damon Heta missed six match darts to advance, which allowed Steve Lennon to take a 6–5 win. Dave Chisnall ended a nine-match losing streak on the European Tour by defeating Gabriel Clemens 6–4, hitting ten maximums in the process.

Dutch players Gian van Veen, Jermaine Wattimena, Danny Noppert and Wessel Nijman all reached the third round: Van Veen beat compatriot Niels Zonneveld 6–4, Noppert defeated Luke Woodhouse 6–3, Wattimena and James Wade both averaged over 106 in a match that saw Wattimena win 6–3, and Nijman defeated Mike De Decker 6–2, with De Decker missing double 12 for a nine-dart finish during the match. Krzysztof Ratajski confirmed his qualification for the European Championship by beating Ryan Searle, while Martin Schindler ended William O'Connor's hopes of qualifying. Cameron Menzies and Ricky Evans were victorious over seeds Rob Cross and Josh Rock.

=== Final day ===
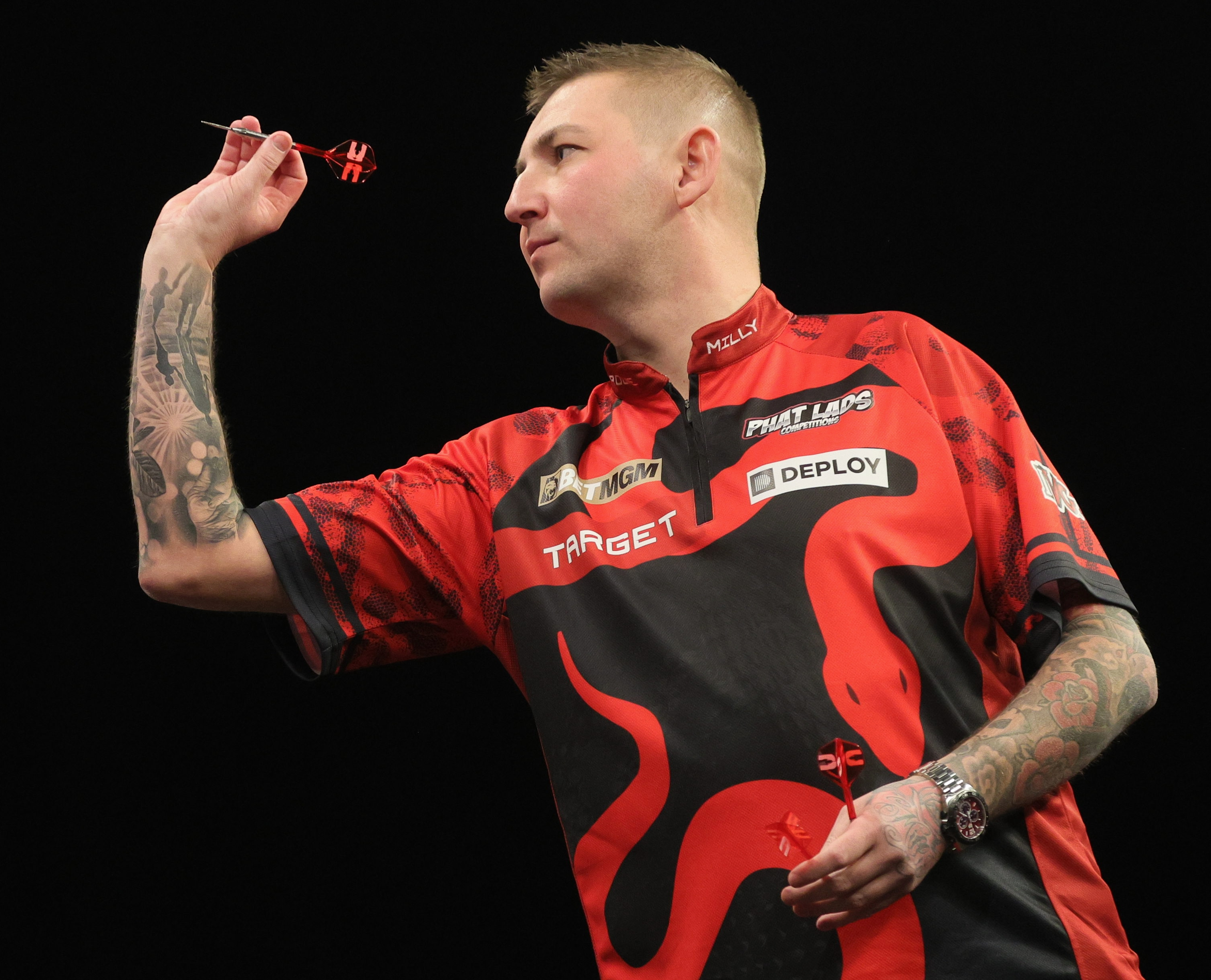
Nathan Aspinall won his third European Tour title of 2025 and confirmed his place as the number one seed for the European Championship.

The third round, quarter-finals, semi-finals and final were played on 19 October. The final day saw Dirk van Duijvenbode and Nathan Aspinall reach the final. Van Duijvenbode survived deciding legs against Martin Schindler and Peter Wright before defeating Krzysztof Ratajski 7–3 in the semi-finals to book his place in the final. Aspinall began the day with a 110.77 average in his third-round match against Steve Lennon, followed by a 6–4 win against Jermaine Wattimena. He faced Gian van Veen in the semi-finals, where Van Veen took a 6–3 lead with a 170 checkout. However, Aspinall won four consecutive legs to complete a 7–6 comeback victory. Van Duijvenbode was aiming to win his maiden European Tour title in his third final—his first European Tour final since June 2023, while Aspinall looked to win his third European Tour title of 2025.

In the second leg of the final, Van Duijvenbode threatened to hit his second nine-dart finish of the tournament, but failed to hit the eighth dart of the sequence, eventually winning the leg in 10 darts. With the two level at 2–2, Aspinall won three legs in a row before extending his lead to 6–2 through a 121 checkout. The Englishman missed two darts at double for 7–2, allowing Van Duijvenbode to halt Aspinall's momentum. From there, Van Duijvenbode tied the match at 6–6. Aspinall took the next leg with a 13-dart hold of throw and converted a 74 checkout on double 20 for an 8–6 victory.

Aspinall, who had not won a single European Tour title in the prior decade, won his third European Tour title of 2025, after triumphing at the European Darts Trophy in March and the European Darts Open in June; he also finished as runner-up at the International Darts Open in April. The win also cemented his place as the number one seed for the European Championship the following weekend. He became the fifth player—after Michael van Gerwen, Peter Wright, Luke Humphries and Dave Chisnall—to win three European Tour titles in the same year. "I'm in very good company," said Aspinall in response to the statistic, also stating that the tournament was "an amazing weekend of darts" and that it had given him "another huge confidence boost".

== Draw ==
The draw was announced on 16 October. Numbers to the left of a player's name show the seedings for the top 16 in the tournament. The figures to the right of a player's name state their three-dart average in a match. Players in bold denote match winners.

**First round** (best of 11 legs); 17 October
**Ryan Joyce 104.24**	**6**
Justin Hood 98.58	2
**Krzysztof Ratajski 96.23**	**6**
Felix Springer 82.37	1
**Ricky Evans 92.74**	**6**
Joe Cullen 82.40	2
**Gabriel Clemens 90.83**	**6**
Tomislav Rosandić 85.12	2
**Dirk van Duijvenbode 101.31**	**6**
Karel Sedláček 92.96	4
Andrew Gilding 92.54	4
**William O'Connor 95.21**	**6**
**Cameron Menzies 95.68**	**6**
Wesley Plaisier 92.38	4
**Ricardo Pietreczko 92.40**	**6**
Radek Szagański 92.07	3
**Jermaine Wattimena 105.61**	**6**
Keane Barry 96.38	2
**Wessel Nijman 95.76**	**6**
Martin Kramer 78.63	2
Jeffrey de Graaf 91.87	2
**Steve Lennon 97.05**	**6**
**Nathan Aspinall 103.78**	**6**
Maximilian Czerwinski 84.35	3
**Raymond van Barneveld 85.70**	**6**
Kevin Troppmann 78.58	3
**Niels Zonneveld 94.13**	**6**
Darius Labanauskas 86.92	2
Daryl Gurney 90.88	2
**Christian Kist 92.43**	**6**
**Luke Woodhouse 90.04**	**6**
Tom Bissell 95.76	4

**Second round** (best of 11 legs); 18 October
1	Stephen Bunting 100.64	3
**Ryan Joyce 101.15**	**6**
16	Ryan Searle 92.34	3
**Krzysztof Ratajski 102.05**	**6**
8	Josh Rock 93.48	2
**Ricky Evans 95.90**	**6**
**9**	**Dave Chisnall 99.90**	**6**
Gabriel Clemens 97.87	4
4	Chris Dobey 105.41	2
**Dirk van Duijvenbode 117.74**	**6**
**13**	**Martin Schindler 97.17**	**6**
William O'Connor 101.34	4
5	Rob Cross 83.83	1
**Cameron Menzies 96.86**	**6**
**12**	**Peter Wright 92.94**	**6**
Ricardo Pietreczko 97.43	5
2	James Wade 106.19	3
**Jermaine Wattimena 107.47**	**6**
15	Mike De Decker 90.27	2
**Wessel Nijman 96.76**	**6**
7	Damon Heta 92.65	5
**Steve Lennon 92.85**	**6**
10	Ross Smith 95.18	4
**Nathan Aspinall 107.53**	**6**
**3**	**Jonny Clayton 96.56**	**6**
Raymond van Barneveld 91.53	3
**14**	**Gian van Veen 98.91**	**6**
Niels Zonneveld 98.24	4
**6**	**Gerwyn Price 100.41**	**6**
Christian Kist 92.09	1
**11**	**Danny Noppert 88.56**	**6**
Luke Woodhouse 78.85	3

**Third round** (best of 11 legs); 19 October
Joyce 92.54	2
**Ratajski 94.19**	**6**
Evans 87.65	2
**9**	**Chisnall 93.58**	**6**
**van Duijvenbode 92.13**	**6**
13	Schindler 93.79	5
Menzies 94.67	4
**12**	**Wright 94.90**	**6**
**Wattimena 111.00**	**6**
Nijman 94.98	2
Lennon 94.24	2
**Aspinall 110.77**	**6**
3	Clayton 87.31	1
**14**	**van Veen 97.63**	**6**
6	Price 101.59	5
**11**	**Noppert 99.39**	**6**

**Quarter-finals** (best of 11 legs); 19 October
**Ratajski 88.36**	**6**
9	Chisnall 94.58	5
**van Duijvenbode 97.77**	**6**
12	Wright 96.87	5
Wattimena 85.41	4
**Aspinall 93.17**	**6**
**14**	**van Veen 105.20**	**6**
11	Noppert 101.53	3

**Semi-finals** (best of 13 legs); 19 October
Ratajski 94.46	3
**van Duijvenbode 96.08**	**7**
**Aspinall 99.78**	**7**
14	van Veen 99.17	6

**Final** (best of 15 legs); 19 October
van Duijvenbode 92.91	6
**Aspinall 97.05**	**8**
