= 2025 Baltic Sea Darts Open =

2025 Elten Safety Shoes Baltic Sea Darts Open

Tournament information
- Dates: 11–13 July 2025
- Venue: Wunderino Arena
- Location: Kiel, Germany
- Organisation(s): Professional Darts Corporation (PDC)
- Format: Legs
- Prize fund: £175,000
- Winner's share: £30,000
- High checkout: 170 Rob Cross

Champion(s)
- Gerwyn Price

The 2025 Baltic Sea Darts Open (known for sponsorship reasons as the 2025 Elten Safety Shoes Baltic Sea Darts Open) was a professional darts tournament that took place at the Wunderino Arena in Kiel, Germany, from 11 to 13 July 2025. It was the ninth of fourteen PDC European Tour events on the 2025 PDC Pro Tour. It featured a field of 48 players and £175,000 in prize money, with £30,000 going to the winner.

Rob Cross was the defending champion after defeating Luke Humphries 8–6 in the 2024 final. However, he lost 6–2 to Andy Baetens in the second round.

Gerwyn Price won the tournament, the ninth European Tour title of his career, by defeating Gary Anderson 8–3 in the final. Price tied Peter Wright for the second-most European Tour titles, behind Michael van Gerwen.

== Prize money ==
The prize fund remained at £175,000, with £30,000 to the winner:

Stage (num. of players)		Prize money
Winner	(1)	£30,000
Runner-up	(1)	£12,000
Semi-finalists	(2)	£8,500
Quarter-finalists	(4)	£6,000
Third round losers	(8)	£4,000
Second round losers	(16)	£2,500*
First round losers	(16)	£1,250*
Total	£175,000	

- Pre-qualified players from the Orders of Merit who lose in their first match of the event shall not be credited with prize money on any Order of Merit. A player who qualifies as a qualifier, but later becomes a seed due to the withdrawal of one or more other players shall be credited with their prize money on all Orders of Merit regardless of how far they progress in the event.

== Qualification and format ==
In a change from the previous year, the top 16 on the two-year main PDC Order of Merit ranking are now seeded and enter the tournament in the second round, while the 16 qualifiers from the one-year PDC Pro Tour Order of Merit ranking enter in the first round. In another change, the 16 Pro Tour Order of Merit qualifiers are drawn against one of the 16 other qualifiers in the first round.

The seedings were confirmed on 14 June. The remaining 16 places went to players from four qualifying events – 10 from the Tour Card Holder Qualifier (held on 20 June), four from the Host Nation Qualifier (held on 17 May), one from the Nordic & Baltic Associate Member Qualifier (held on 10 May), and one from the East European Associate Member Qualifier (held on 16 February).

Michael van Gerwen, Peter Wright, Ryan Joyce, Michael Smith and Andrew Gilding all withdrew from the event. They were replaced by five players from the reserve list. Martin Schindler and Ryan Searle moved up to become the 15th and 16th seeds respectively.

The following players took part in the tournament:

Seeded Players

1. Luke Humphries (quarter-finals)
2. Stephen Bunting (second round)
3. Jonny Clayton (quarter-finals)
4. Nathan Aspinall (third round)
5. Chris Dobey (semi-finals)
6. Rob Cross (second round)
7. James Wade (semi-finals)
8. Damon Heta (second round)
9. Gerwyn Price (champion)
10. Dave Chisnall (second round)
11. Gary Anderson (runner-up)
12. Ross Smith (third round)
13. Danny Noppert (quarter-finals)
14. Josh Rock (third round)
15. Martin Schindler (quarter-finals)
16. Ryan Searle (third round)

Pro Tour Order of Merit Qualifiers
- Cameron Menzies (second round)
- Gian van Veen (second round)
- Wessel Nijman (third round)
- Mike De Decker (second round)
- Dirk van Duijvenbode (second round)
- Daryl Gurney (third round)
- Luke Woodhouse (second round)
- Raymond van Barneveld (first round)
- Joe Cullen (first round)
- Jermaine Wattimena (second round)
- Ricardo Pietreczko (second round)

Tour Card Qualifier
- Justin Hood (second round)
- Sebastian Białecki (first round)
- Krzysztof Ratajski (second round)
- Ryan Meikle (first round)
- Andy Baetens (third round)
- Martin Lukeman (first round)
- Tytus Kanik (first round)
- Callan Rydz (first round)
- Mensur Suljović (first round)
- Ian White (first round)

Host Nation Qualifier
- Liam Maendl-Lawrance (first round)
- Kevin Troppmann (first round)
- Yorick Hofkens (first round)
- Martin Kramer (first round)

Nordic & Baltic Qualifier
- Johan Engström (first round)

East European Qualifier
- Mirosław Grudziecki (first round)

Reserve List
- Mickey Mansell (second round)
- William O'Connor (second round)
- Kim Huybrechts (second round)
- Richard Veenstra (first round)
- Niko Springer (third round)

== Summary ==
=== First round ===
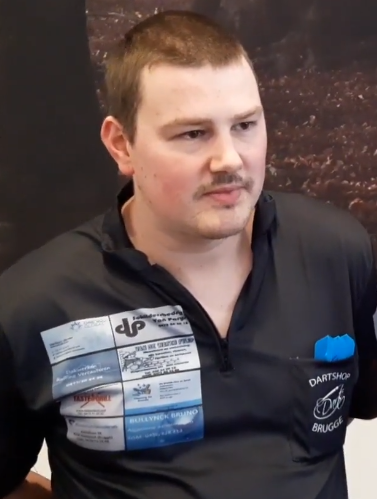
Andy Baetens eliminated Raymond van Barneveld and defending champion Rob Cross.

The first round was played on Friday 11 July. Daryl Gurney, making his first appearance on stage after winning the World Cup of Darts for Northern Ireland, defeated Martin Lukeman 6–4. Gurney said he was "very pleased" to get the win after initially going 3–1 down. Reigning World Grand Prix champion Mike De Decker hoped to bring his "A-game" with him to the rest of the tournament after seeing off Mensur Suljović 6–2. Cameron Menzies survived a potential early exit against 18-year-old European Tour debutant Yorick Hofkens. After missing double 12 for a nine-dart finish in the ninth leg, Menzies completed a comeback from 5–3 down to win 6–5. Gian van Veen achieved the only whitewash win of the first round as he defeated Johan Engström 6–0. Dirk van Duijvenbode defeated Ryan Meikle 6–2 with a 105 three-dart average, the highest of the first round. Jermaine Wattimena recorded an average of 103 in his 6–1 victory over Callan Rydz, who himself averaged over 100. Wessel Nijman produced a 150 checkout on his way to beating Germany qualifier Martin Kramer 6–3. Andy Baetens eliminated five-time world champion Raymond van Barneveld, while Justin Hood made a successful European Tour debut through a 6–3 victory over Joe Cullen.

=== Second round ===
The second round was played on Saturday 12 July. Tour Card qualifier Andy Baetens continued his run by beating defending champion Rob Cross 6–2. Cross hit a 170 checkout in the fifth leg, but Baetens won three consecutive legs to win the match and progress to the third round of a European Tour event for the second time. Niko Springer defeated Stephen Bunting by the same scoreline, revealing post-match that he had to postpone his holiday to Crete to compete on the last day of the event. He advanced to a match-up against compatriot Martin Schindler in the third round, who defeated Jermaine Wattimena 6–3. Seeded players Damon Heta and Dave Chisnall were eliminated by Wessel Nijman and Daryl Gurney respectively; Chisnall's loss to Gurney guaranteed a first-time winner of the event. World number one Luke Humphries narrowly avoided defeat to Mickey Mansell, who missed a match dart to allow Humphries to take the 6–5 victory. Ross Smith whitewashed Kim Huybrechts 6–0, while Wales's Jonny Clayton and Gerwyn Price started their campaigns with wins over Gian van Veen and William O'Connor. Gary Anderson was also victorious, defeating Krzysztof Ratajski 6–2. First round winners Cameron Menzies, Ricardo Pietreczko, Mike De Decker, Dirk van Duijvenbode, Luke Woodhouse and Justin Hood were eliminated in the second round.

=== Final day ===
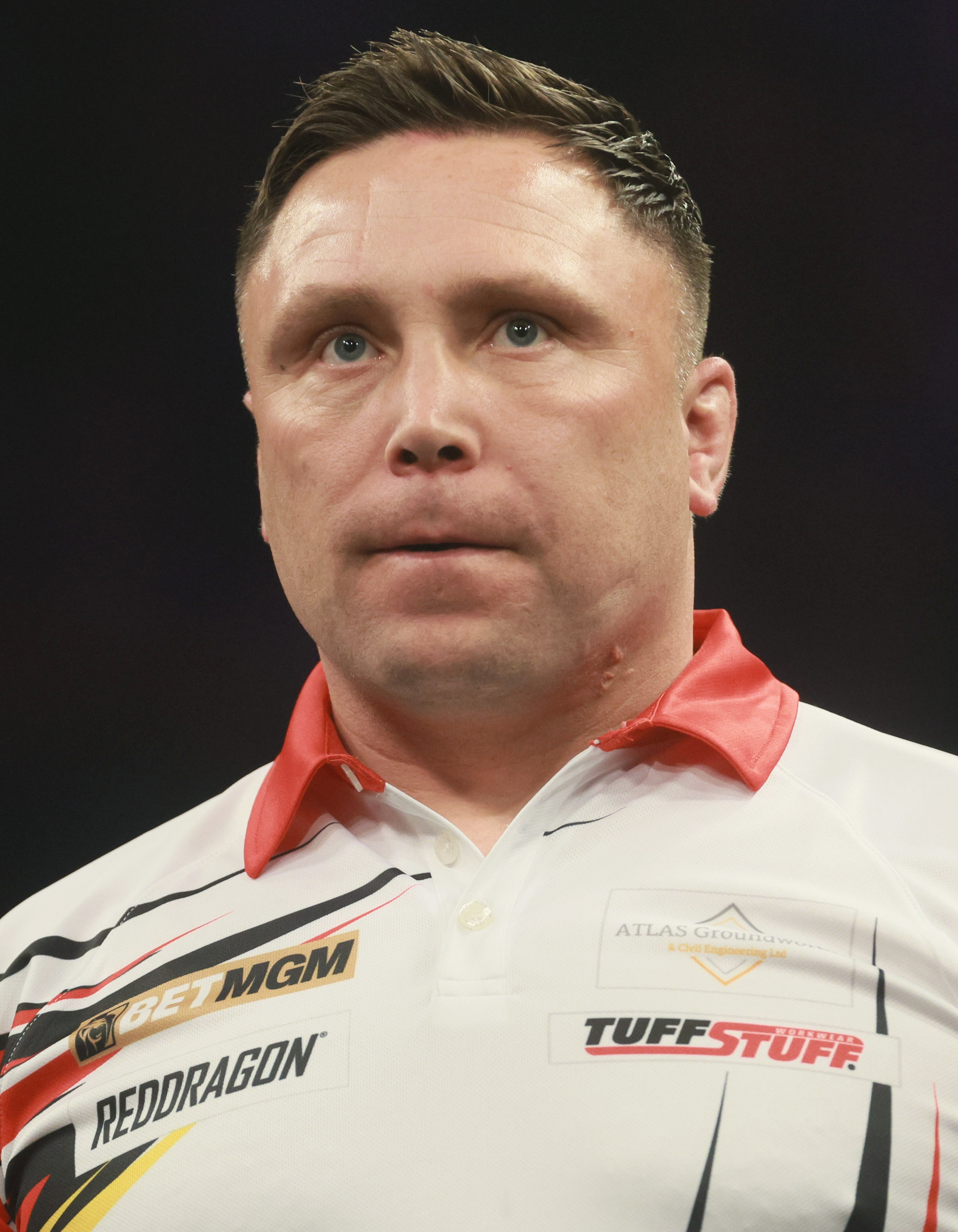
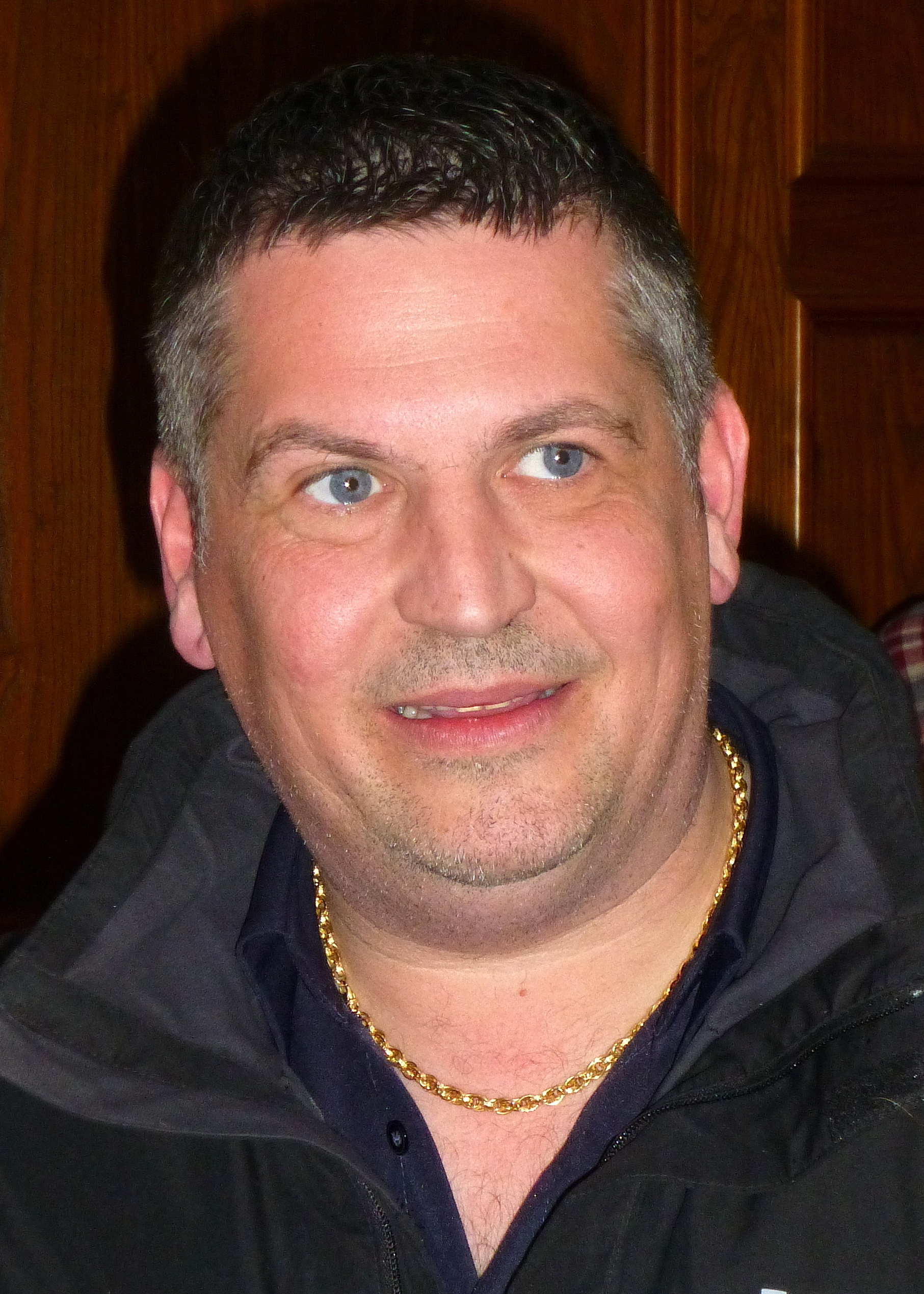
Former world champions Gerwyn Price and Gary Anderson contested the final.

The third round, quarter-finals, semi-finals and final were played on Sunday 13 July. The final day saw Gerwyn Price and Gary Anderson reach the final. After surviving two match darts and hitting a 119 checkout to beat Wessel Nijman 6–5 in the third round, Price advanced to the final by defeating fellow Premier League players Luke Humphries and Chris Dobey by scorelines of 6–3 and 7–3. Anderson ended Andy Baetens's campaign with a 6–3 win, followed by wide victories in the quarter-finals and semi-finals. He averaged 108 in defeating Jonny Clayton 6–1, then secured his place in the final with a 7–1 triumph against James Wade. Anderson looked to add a second 2025 European Tour title to his European Darts Grand Prix win in May, while Price was challenging for his first title on the tour since the 2023 International Darts Open.

In the final, Anderson took an early 2–1 lead by hitting the bullseye for a 90 finish to break. However, Price took control of the match and won the next five legs to go 6–2 up. After Price missed opportunities to make it 7–2, Anderson was unable to take advantage, allowing Price to hit double 1 to go one leg away from victory. Despite a 125 checkout with two bullseyes from Anderson to halt his losing streak, Price hit double 12 to win the final 8–3. This marked his ninth European Tour title, his first since 2023, as well as his fourth ranking title of 2025. Price's nine titles put him into joint-second in the all-time European Tour winners list, alongside Peter Wright and behind Michael van Gerwen.

Speaking following his win, Price believed that Anderson "wasn't at his best in the final" and also thought that he could have performed better himself. Previewing the World Matchplay, he said that adding a European Tour title to his Poland Darts Masters win and deep runs in recent Players Championship events put him in "good stead" heading into the major tournament. Runner-up Anderson claimed that "to get to the final of any tournament is great" and stated that he was also looking forward to the World Matchplay.

== Draw ==
The draw was announced on 10 July. Numbers to the left of players' names show the seedings for the top four in the tournament. The figures to the right of a player's name state their three-dart average in a match. Players in bold denote match winners.

**First round** (best of 11 legs); 11 July
**Mickey Mansell 84.78**	**6**
Mirosław Grudziecki 81.59	3
**Cameron Menzies 100.89**	**6**
Yorick Hofkens 92.37	5
**Wessel Nijman 83.86**	**6**
Martin Kramer 82.71	3
**William O'Connor 84.79**	**6**
Tytus Kanik 83.39	5
**Ricardo Pietreczko 91.57**	**6**
Sebastian Białecki 91.05	2
**Mike De Decker 95.65**	**6**
Mensur Suljović 90.60	2
**Dirk van Duijvenbode 105.31**	**6**
Ryan Meikle 87.06	2
**Kim Huybrechts 89.60**	**6**
Ian White 87.25	3
**Niko Springer 90.83**	**6**
Kevin Troppmann 88.97	2
**Jermaine Wattimena 103.36**	**6**
Callan Rydz 100.09	1
**Luke Woodhouse 88.80**	**6**
Liam Maendl-Lawrance 83.86	2
**Daryl Gurney 97.99**	**6**
Martin Lukeman 90.89	4
**Gian van Veen 102.48**	**6**
Johan Engström 82.75	0
Joe Cullen 97.48	3
**Justin Hood 98.50**	**6**
Raymond van Barneveld 83.26	4
**Andy Baetens 91.40**	**6**
Richard Veenstra 82.06	2
**Krzysztof Ratajski 93.12**	**6**

**Second round** (best of 11 legs); 12 July
**1**	**Luke Humphries 91.57**	**6**
Mickey Mansell 94.56	5
**16**	**Ryan Searle 100.48**	**6**
Cameron Menzies 91.79	3
8	Damon Heta 93.98	3
**Wessel Nijman 93.92**	**6**
**9**	**Gerwyn Price 101.73**	**6**
William O'Connor 87.24	1
**4**	**Nathan Aspinall 99.45**	**6**
Ricardo Pietreczko 90.49	4
**13**	**Danny Noppert 100.31**	**6**
Mike De Decker 88.86	3
**5**	**Chris Dobey 97.76**	**6**
Dirk van Duijvenbode 85.32	3
**12**	**Ross Smith 91.09**	**6**
Kim Huybrechts 86.77	0
2	Stephen Bunting 93.13	2
**Niko Springer 100.72**	**6**
**15**	**Martin Schindler 93.42**	**6**
Jermaine Wattimena 90.00	3
**7**	**James Wade 96.64**	**6**
Luke Woodhouse 87.74	1
10	Dave Chisnall 89.01	3
**Daryl Gurney 93.04**	**6**
**3**	**Jonny Clayton 98.54**	**6**
Gian van Veen 96.21	4
**14**	**Josh Rock 100.01**	**6**
Justin Hood 95.73	1
6	Rob Cross 96.41	2
**Andy Baetens 98.48**	**6**
**11**	**Gary Anderson 98.77**	**6**
Krzysztof Ratajski 90.10	2

**Third round** (best of 11 legs); 13 July
**1**	**Humphries 94.93**	**6**
16	Searle 77.47	0
Nijman 95.10	5
**9**	**Price 95.75**	**6**
4	Aspinall 90.96	2
**13**	**Noppert 98.50**	**6**
**5**	**Dobey 93.44**	**6**
12	Smith 98.30	3
Springer 88.36	4
**15**	**Schindler 96.06**	**6**
**7**	**Wade 95.76**	**6**
Gurney 91.46	5
**3**	**Clayton 106.90**	**6**
14	Rock 104.55	2
Baetens 103.97	3
**11**	**Anderson 100.96**	**6**

**Quarter-finals** (best of 11 legs); 13 July
1	Humphries 90.37	3
**9**	**Price 102.55**	**6**
13	Noppert 98.53	1
**5**	**Dobey 102.24**	**6**
15	Schindler 98.75	3
**7**	**Wade 93.90**	**6**
3	Clayton 103.20	1
**11**	**Anderson 108.03**	**6**

**Semi-finals** (best of 13 legs); 13 July
**9**	**Price 101.96**	**7**
5	Dobey 101.38	3
7	Wade 89.54	1
**11**	**Anderson 95.31**	**7**

**Final** (best of 15 legs); 13 July
**9**	**Price 91.92**	**8**
11	Anderson 89.80	3
