= Justin Hood (darts player) =

English darts player (born 1993)

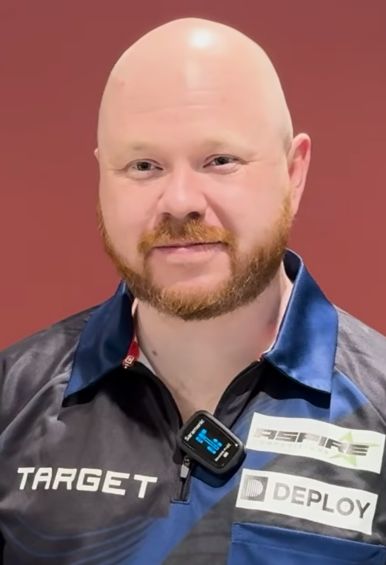
- Hood in 2026

Personal information
- Nickname: "Pocket Rocket"
- Born: 29 April 1993 (age 33) Bath, Somerset, England
- Home town: Glastonbury, Somerset, England

Sport
- Sport: Darts
- Playing since: 2008
- Darts: 23g Target
- Laterality: Left-handed
- Walk-on music: "All the Small Things" by Blink-182

Organisation (see split in darts)
- BDO: 2019–2020
- PDC: 2020–present (Tour Card: 2025–present)
- WDF: 2019–2020
- Current world ranking: (PDC) 38 (29 October 2026)

WDF major events – best performances
- World Championship: Last 32: 2020
- World Masters: Last 32: 2019

PDC premier events – best performances
- World Championship: Quarter-final: 2026
- UK Open: Last 64: 2025
- PC Finals: Last 32: 2025

Other tournament wins
- Years
British Internationals (Team event)	2022
PDC Challenge Tour	2024

Justin Hood (born 29 April 1993) is an English professional darts player who competes in Professional Darts Corporation (PDC) events. Nicknamed "Pocket Rocket", Hood gained a PDC Tour Card in 2025, having previously appeared at the 2020 BDO World Championship. He made the quarter-finals on his PDC World Championship debut at the 2026 event, and reached his first PDC ranking final at Players Championship 9 on the 2026 PDC Pro Tour.

== Career ==
In October 2019, Hood reached the last 32 of the World Masters, losing to eventual champion John O'Shea. He qualified for the 2020 BDO World Darts Championship, beating former finalist Jeff Smith and Craig Venman to secure his place in the tournament. He defeated Gabriel Pascaru in the preliminary round, before losing to Richard Veenstra 3–1 in the last 32.

In April 2023, Hood won week eight of the MODUS Super Series by beating Canadian player Jacob Taylor 4–0 in the final. In June 2024, Hood won his first PDC Challenge Tour title, defeating Dragutin Horvat 5–1 in the event fourteen final with a three-dart average of 107.24.

At 2025 Q-School, Hood gained a PDC Tour Card for the first time, defeating Bradley Brooks 6–5 to win day two of the final stage. Hood made his PDC European Tour debut at the 2025 Baltic Sea Darts Open, where he earned a 6–3 win over Joe Cullen before being eliminated in the next round.

Hood qualified for the 2026 PDC World Darts Championship, his PDC World Championship debut, and won his first-round match 3–0 against Nick Kenny. In the second round, Hood claimed a 3–2 victory over world number six Danny Noppert, winning the match in a sudden-death leg. The match has been described as an "epic" and an "Alexandra Palace classic" due to its high quality and dramatic play. Hood advanced to the quarter-finals after a 4–0 win against Josh Rock in the fourth round, where he successfully hit his first 11 shots at double. He was eliminated by Gary Anderson in a 5–2 defeat.

Hood reached his first PDC ranking final at Players Championship 9 on the 2026 PDC Pro Tour, losing 8–4 to Chris Dobey.

== Personal life ==
Hood's previous nickname, "Happy Feet", stemmed from an incident where he forgot to bring regulation black shoes to a darts event and had to borrow a pair of shoes much too large for him; he changed the nickname in 2026 due to legal issues. He previously worked as a night porter at a hotel with his wife Jessica.

Hood has been noted in media interviews for his desire to buy a Chinese restaurant with his darts winnings.

== World Championship results ==
=== BDO ===
- 2020: First round (lost to Richard Veenstra 1–3) (sets)

=== PDC ===
- 2026: Quarter-finals (lost to Gary Anderson 2–5)

== Performance timeline ==
Hood's performance timeline is as follows:

=== BDO ===
Tournament	2019	2020
BDO Ranked televised events
World Championship	DNQ	1R
World Masters	4R	NH

=== PDC ===
Tournament	2020	2024	2025	2026
PDC Ranked televised events
World Championship	DNQ			QF
World Masters	DNQ			Prel.
UK Open	DNQ		4R	3R
Players Championship Finals	DNQ		2R	
Career statistics
Season-end ranking	201	162	50	

==== European Tour ====
Tournament	2025	2026
Baltic Sea Open	2R	3R
German Championship	1R	NH
Slovak Open	NH	1R

==== Players Championships ====
Season	1	2	3	4	5	6	7	8	9	10	11	12	13	14	15	16	17	18	19	20	21	22	23	24	25	26	27	28	29	30	31	32	33	34
2020 (Note: Not a Tour card holder)	Did not participate													NIE; 1R	NIE; 1R	NIE; 1R	NIE; 1R	NIE; 2R	COV; Did not participate															
2024	Did not participate												MIL; 1R	MIL; 2R	MIL; DNP		MIL; 3R	MIL; 2R	MIL; 2R	WIG; 1R	WIG; 1R	LEI; 1R	LEI; 3R	WIG; 1R	WIG; 1R	WIG; 1R	WIG; 2R	WIG; 1R	LEI; 1R	LEI; 1R				
2025	WIG; 1R	WIG; 2R	ROS; 4R	ROS; 3R	LEI; 1R	LEI; 1R	HIL; 2R	HIL; 2R	LEI; 1R	LEI; 4R	LEI; 2R	LEI; 2R	ROS; 1R	ROS; 2R	HIL; 3R	HIL; 1R	LEI; 2R	LEI; 2R	LEI; 1R	LEI; 1R	LEI; 1R	HIL; 3R	HIL; QF	MIL; 1R	MIL; 4R	HIL; 1R	HIL; 1R	LEI; 1R	LEI; 1R	LEI; 2R	WIG; 3R	WIG; 1R	WIG; 1R	WIG; 2R
2026	HIL; 3R	HIL; 1R	WIG; 2R	WIG; 1R	LEI; 1R	LEI; 2R	LEI; DNP		WIG; F	WIG; 2R	MIL; 2R	MIL; 3R	HIL; 1R	HIL; 2R	LEI; 2R	LEI; 4R	LEI; 3R	LEI; 2R	MIL; 1R	MIL; 1R	WIG; 1R	WIG; 1R	LEI; 1R	LEI; 4R	HIL; 3R	HIL; SF	LEI; 2R	LEI; 4R	ROS; 1R	ROS; 1R	ROS; 1R	ROS; 2R	LEI; 3R	LEI; 3R

Performance Table Legend
W	Won the tournament	F	Finalist	SF	Semifinalist	QF	Quarterfinalist	#R; RR; Prel.	Lost in # round Round-robin; Preliminary round	DQ	Disqualified
DNQ	Did not qualify	DNP	Did not participate	WD	Withdrew	NH	Tournament not held	#R; RR; Prel.	Lost in # round Round-robin; Preliminary round	NYF	Not yet founded
