= 2026 PDC Players Championship series =

Darts tournament series

The 2026 PDC Players Championship series is an ongoing series of 34 non-televised darts tournaments on the 2026 PDC Pro Tour. The Players Championship Order of Merit, a ranking list that only includes the prize money won by each player in the Players Championship events, will determine the field of 64 participants for the 2026 Players Championship Finals in November.

As of Players Championship 33, 22 nine-dart finishes have been hit during the series.

== Prize money ==
The total prize money for Players Championship events in 2026 increased to £150,000 per event from a previous total of £125,000 in 2025. The winner of each event receives £15,000. The prize fund breakdown is:

| Stage (no. of players) | | Prize money (Total: £150,000) |
|---|---|---|
| Winner | (1) | £15,000 |
| Runner-up | (1) | £10,000 |
| Semi-finalists | (2) | £6,500 |
| Quarter-finalists | (4) | £4,000 |
| Last 16 (fourth round) | (8) | £3,000 |
| Last 32 (third round) | (16) | £2,000 |
| Last 64 (second round) | (32) | £1,250 |

== February ==
=== Players Championship 1 ===
Players Championship 1 was contested on Monday 9 February 2026 at the Halle 39 in Hildesheim. Mickey Mansell hit a nine-dart finish in his victory against Carl Sneyd. The tournament was won by James Wade, who defeated Nathan Aspinall 8–6 in the final.

Quarter-finals (best of 11 legs)
32 | Michael van Gerwen 95.30 | 6
Jack Tweddell 90.74 | 3
13 | James Wade 87.76 | 6
21 | Joe Cullen 95.31 | 5
2 | Nathan Aspinall 96.86 | 6
Gabriel Clemens 88.22 | 1
3 | Wessel Nijman 94.73 | 4
Adam Gawlas 95.98 | 6

Semi-finals (best of 13 legs)
32 | Michael van Gerwen 96.90 | 6
13 | James Wade 93.32 | 7
2 | Nathan Aspinall 96.15 | 7
Adam Gawlas 93.13 | 4

Final (best of 15 legs)
13 | James Wade 93.69 | 8
2 | Nathan Aspinall 95.26 | 6

=== Players Championship 2 ===
Players Championship 2 was contested on Tuesday 10 February 2026 at the Halle 39 in Hildesheim. James Hurrell and Gabriel Clemens hit nine-dart finishes in their respective victories over Maik Kuivenhoven and Madars Razma. The tournament was won by Wessel Nijman, who defeated Gerwyn Price 8–7 in the final.

Quarter-finals (best of 11 legs)
1 | Gerwyn Price 117.12 | 6
25 | Michael van Gerwen 99.63 | 0
13 | Danny Noppert 96.80 | 2
21 | Krzysztof Ratajski 101.45 | 6
15 | Ryan Searle 90.88 | 6
23 | Dave Chisnall 86.50 | 1
3 | Wessel Nijman 106.03 | 6
Carl Sneyd 84.80 | 2

Semi-finals (best of 13 legs)
1 | Gerwyn Price 104.52 | 7
21 | Krzysztof Ratajski 97.55 | 4
15 | Ryan Searle 99.73 | 2
3 | Wessel Nijman 100.11 | 7

Final (best of 15 legs)
1 | Gerwyn Price 107.41 | 7
3 | Wessel Nijman 102.78 | 8

=== Players Championship 3 ===
Players Championship 3 was contested on Monday 16 February 2026 at the Robin Park Tennis Centre in Wigan. The tournament was won by Chris Dobey, who defeated Stephen Bunting 8–1 in the final.

Quarter-finals (best of 11 legs)
Tom Bissell 93.45 | 6
Jim Long 89.05 | 4
13 | Chris Dobey 94.32 | 6
Darryl Pilgrim 88.67 | 5
2 | Stephen Bunting 96.59 | 6
7 | Jonny Clayton 92.20 | 3
30 | Kevin Doets 90.85 | 4
11 | James Wade 92.79 | 6

Semi-finals (best of 13 legs)
Tom Bissell 88.09 | 2
13 | Chris Dobey 100.42 | 7
2 | Stephen Bunting 101.85 | 7
11 | James Wade 95.39 | 6

Final (best of 15 legs)
13 | Chris Dobey 95.37 | 8
2 | Stephen Bunting 84.92 | 1

=== Players Championship 4 ===
Players Championship 4 was contested on Tuesday 17 February 2026 at the Robin Park Tennis Centre in Wigan. The tournament was won by Luke Humphries, who defeated Wessel Nijman 8–6 in the final.

Quarter-finals (best of 11 legs)
17 | Luke Humphries 108.53 | 6
25 | Niels Zonneveld 92.71 | 2
4 | Gerwyn Price 100.61 | 6
Sebastian Białecki 92.21 | 4
2 | Wessel Nijman 91.13 | 6
26 | Daryl Gurney 87.45 | 5
Callan Rydz 88.22 | 6
22 | Mike De Decker 80.32 | 2

Semi-finals (best of 13 legs)
17 | Luke Humphries 101.32 | 7
4 | Gerwyn Price 100.52 | 4
2 | Wessel Nijman 88.35 | 7
Callan Rydz 91.02 | 3

Final (best of 15 legs)
17 | Luke Humphries 101.32 | 8
2 | Wessel Nijman 92.87 | 6

=== Players Championship 5 ===
Players Championship 5 was contested on Tuesday 24 February 2026 at the Leicester Arena. Chris Dobey hit a nine-dart finish in his victory against Ricky Evans. The tournament was won by Ross Smith, who defeated Dobey 8–2 in the final.

Quarter-finals (best of 11 legs)
8 | Chris Dobey 92.97 | 6
Christian Kist 85.90 | 0
20 | Joe Cullen 89.77 | 6
21 | Niels Zonneveld 83.83 | 2
2 | Ross Smith 97.42 | 6
23 | Dave Chisnall 91.09 | 3
30 | Karel Sedláček 95.21 | 6
Alan Soutar 95.41 | 4

Semi-finals (best of 13 legs)
8 | Chris Dobey 99.09 | 7
20 | Joe Cullen 95.60 | 4
2 | Ross Smith 96.54 | 7
30 | Karel Sedláček 94.05 | 4

Final (best of 15 legs)
8 | Chris Dobey 97.86 | 2
2 | Ross Smith 104.24 | 8

=== Players Championship 6 ===
Players Championship 6 was contested on Wednesday 25 February 2026 at the Leicester Arena. Beau Greaves and Max Hopp both hit a nine-dart finish in their respective victory and defeat against Mensur Suljović and Thibault Tricole. The tournament was won by Gerwyn Price, who beat Andrew Gilding 8–1 in the final.

Quarter-finals (best of 11 legs)
1 | Gerwyn Price 108.59 | 6
24 | Kevin Doets 101.76 | 4
4 | Jonny Clayton 102.27 | 6
Christian Kist 96.58 | 3
2 | Ross Smith 99.29 | 5
23 | Andrew Gilding 92.31 | 6
Thibault Tricole 91.99 | 6
David Sharp 90.31 | 3

Semi-finals (best of 13 legs)
1 | Gerwyn Price 104.47 | 7
4 | Jonny Clayton 101.29 | 4
23 | Andrew Gilding 93.48 | 7
Thibault Tricole 87.18 | 6

Final (best of 15 legs)
1 | Gerwyn Price 95.59 | 8
23 | Andrew Gilding 94.67 | 1

== March ==
=== Players Championship 7 ===
Players Championship 7 was contested on Monday 30 March 2026 at the Leicester Arena. During the tournament, James Wade became the first player to reach 1,000 wins in Players Championship events. The tournament was won by Ryan Searle, who defeated Alan Soutar 8–3 in the final.

Quarter-finals (best of 11 legs)
17 | Ryan Searle 99.41 | 6
Charlie Manby 99.49 | 3
20 | Gary Anderson 103.97 | 6
5 | Chris Dobey 93.84 | 2
Keane Barry 104.12 | 6
Jeffrey Sparidaans 96.24 | 3
30 | Peter Wright 77.77 | 1
Alan Soutar 96.08 | 6

Semi-finals (best of 13 legs)
17 | Ryan Searle 96.52 | 7
20 | Gary Anderson 95.60 | 3
Keane Barry 93.29 | 6
Alan Soutar 94.19 | 7

Final (best of 15 legs)
17 | Ryan Searle 95.65 | 8
Alan Soutar 99.00 | 3

=== Players Championship 8 ===
Players Championship 8 was contested on Tuesday 31 March 2026 at the Leicester Arena. The tournament was won by Wessel Nijman, who defeated Joe Cullen 8–4 in the final.

Quarter-finals (best of 11 legs)
1 | Wessel Nijman 105.11 | 6
24 | Dave Chisnall 103.68 | 4
4 | Chris Dobey 97.06 | 5
28 | Kevin Doets 97.55 | 6
Charlie Manby 96.46 | 4
23 | Joe Cullen 95.75 | 6
Sebastian Białecki 96.47 | 6
Leon Weber 85.40 | 1

Semi-finals (best of 13 legs)
1 | Wessel Nijman 94.55 | 7
28 | Kevin Doets 91.20 | 6
23 | Joe Cullen 96.21 | 7
Sebastian Białecki 93.75 | 4

Final (best of 15 legs)
1 | Wessel Nijman 97.70 | 8
23 | Joe Cullen 98.98 | 4

== April ==
=== Players Championship 9 ===
Players Championship 9 was contested on Monday 13 April 2026 at the Robin Park Tennis Centre in Wigan. Thomas Lovely hit a nine-dart finish in his defeat against Luke Woodhouse. The tournament was won by Chris Dobey, who defeated Justin Hood 8–4 in the final.

Quarter-finals (best of 11 legs)
Tom Bissell 84.30 | 4
Connor Scutt 85.77 | 6
Tom Sykes 82.25 | 0
Justin Hood 104.86 | 6
Beau Greaves 91.43 | 3
23 | Andrew Gilding 98.26 | 6
3 | Chris Dobey 94.90 | 6
Richard Veenstra 92.95 | 3

Semi-finals (best of 13 legs)
Connor Scutt 91.66 | 3
Justin Hood 92.13 | 7
23 | Andrew Gilding 84.82 | 1
3 | Chris Dobey 103.45 | 7

Final (best of 15 legs)
Justin Hood 102.91 | 4
3 | Chris Dobey 105.28 | 8

=== Players Championship 10 ===
Players Championship 10 was contested on Tuesday 14 April 2026 at the Robin Park Tennis Centre in Wigan. The tournament was won by Wessel Nijman, who defeated Scott Waites 8–2 in the final.

Quarter-finals (best of 11 legs)
1 | Wessel Nijman 109.71 | 6
Beau Greaves 84.09 | 2
13 | Luke Woodhouse 90.59 | 6
Joe Hunt 94.33 | 4
2 | Chris Dobey 89.00 | 5
26 | Karel Sedláček 88.94 | 6
Scott Waites 96.99 | 6
22 | Kevin Doets 89.07 | 4

Semi-finals (best of 13 legs)
1 | Wessel Nijman 108.46 | 7
13 | Luke Woodhouse 100.46 | 4
26 | Karel Sedláček 99.86 | 5
Scott Waites 96.21 | 7

Final (best of 15 legs)
1 | Wessel Nijman 101.34 | 8
Scott Waites 83.98 | 2

=== Players Championship 11 ===
Players Championship 11 was contested on Monday 27 April 2026 at Arena MK in Milton Keynes. Gary Anderson hit a nine-dart finish in his victory against Alexander Merkx. The tournament was won by Beau Greaves, who became the first woman to win a PDC ranking title by defeating Michael Smith 8–7 in the final.

Quarter-finals (best of 11 legs)
1 | Wessel Nijman 105.57 | 3
24 | Gary Anderson 108.10 | 6
Rob Cross 105.96 | 5
Beau Greaves 102.56 | 6
31 | Michael Smith 85.75 | 6
23 | Andrew Gilding 92.37 | 5
19 | William O'Connor 91.25 | 1
22 | Kevin Doets 93.51 | 6

Semi-finals (best of 13 legs)
24 | Gary Anderson 96.11 | 1
Beau Greaves 105.56 | 7
31 | Michael Smith 88.57 | 7
22 | Kevin Doets 96.62 | 4

Final (best of 15 legs)
Beau Greaves 96.49 | 8
31 | Michael Smith 97.74 | 7

=== Players Championship 12 ===
Players Championship 12 was contested on Tuesday 28 April 2026 at Arena MK in Milton Keynes. The tournament was won by Wessel Nijman, who defeated Jermaine Wattimena 8–5 in the final.

Quarter-finals (best of 11 legs)
1 | Wessel Nijman 97.40 | 6
Nathan Potter 92.06 | 2
Tom Bissell 101.81 | 6
Max Hopp 90.56 | 3
2 | Chris Dobey 98.69 | 3
7 | Jermaine Wattimena 104.43 | 6
19 | Kevin Doets 98.58 | 6
22 | Gary Anderson 92.13 | 1

Semi-finals (best of 13 legs)
1 | Wessel Nijman 103.41 | 7
Tom Bissell 100.18 | 4
7 | Jermaine Wattimena 94.49 | 7
19 | Kevin Doets 94.85 | 3

Final (best of 15 legs)
1 | Wessel Nijman 96.84 | 8
7 | Jermaine Wattimena 94.12 | 5

== May ==
=== Players Championship 13 ===
Players Championship 13 was contested on Monday 4 May 2026 at the Halle 39 in Hildesheim. Dirk van Duijvenbode hit a nine-dart finish in his victory against Madars Razma. The tournament was won by Kevin Doets, who defeated Luke Woodhouse 8–5 in the final.

Quarter-finals (best of 11 legs)
17 | Andrew Gilding 97.10 | 4
Maik Kuivenhoven 87.64 | 6
Robert Owen 89.22 | 2
12 | Kevin Doets 107.19 | 6
2 | Chris Dobey 97.96 | 4
10 | Luke Woodhouse 97.61 | 6
Darius Labanauskas 96.79 | 4
Mensur Suljović 93.72 | 6

Semi-finals (best of 13 legs)
Maik Kuivenhoven 91.13 | 1
12 | Kevin Doets 99.20 | 7
10 | Luke Woodhouse 90.59 | 7
Mensur Suljović 79.53 | 2

Final (best of 15 legs)
12 | Kevin Doets 100.61 | 8
10 | Luke Woodhouse 94.26 | 5

=== Players Championship 14 ===
Players Championship 14 was contested on Tuesday 5 May 2026 at the Halle 39 in Hildesheim. Richard Veenstra hit a nine-dart finish in his victory against Leon Weber. The tournament was won by Wessel Nijman, who defeated Max Hopp 8–1 in the final.

Quarter-finals (best of 11 legs)
1 | Wessel Nijman 102.98 | 6
9 | Krzysztof Ratajski 77.46 | 1
4 | Danny Noppert 102.20 | 6
28 | Richard Veenstra 100.49 | 2
Tom Bissell 85.61 | 6
Mensur Suljović 78.65 | 5
Joe Hunt 93.07 | 3
Max Hopp 97.44 | 6

Semi-finals (best of 13 legs)
1 | Wessel Nijman 100.66 | 7
4 | Danny Noppert 91.47 | 2
Tom Bissell 89.55 | 3
Max Hopp 89.83 | 7

Final (best of 15 legs)
1 | Wessel Nijman 104.62 | 8
Max Hopp 98.08 | 1

=== Players Championship 15 ===
Players Championship 15 was contested on Tuesday 12 May 2026 at the Leicester Arena. The tournament was won by Michael van Gerwen, who defeated Dirk van Duijvenbode 8–5 in the final.

Quarter-finals (best of 11 legs)
17 | Martin Schindler 97.92 | 6
Ritchie Edhouse 88.50 | 2
29 | Michael van Gerwen 102.47 | 6
Beau Greaves 97.02 | 2
18 | Dirk van Duijvenbode 97.95 | 6
7 | Josh Rock 95.93 | 3
3 | Stephen Bunting 94.39 | 6
22 | Joe Cullen 91.00 | 3

Semi-finals (best of 13 legs)
17 | Martin Schindler 108.78 | 0
29 | Michael van Gerwen 122.34 | 7
18 | Dirk van Duijvenbode 100.64 | 7
3 | Stephen Bunting 97.36 | 5

Final (best of 15 legs)
29 | Michael van Gerwen 106.57 | 8
18 | Dirk van Duijvenbode 101.86 | 5

=== Players Championship 16 ===
Players Championship 16 was contested on Wednesday 13 May 2026 at the Leicester Arena. Kim Huybrechts hit a nine-dart finish in his victory against Tavis Dudeney. The tournament was won by Andrew Gilding, who defeated Jonny Clayton 8–3 in the final.

Quarter-finals (best of 11 legs)
Callum Goffin 94.69 | 3
Ian White 93.87 | 6
20 | Andrew Gilding 103.82 | 6
Joe Hunt 90.95 | 2
2 | Stephen Bunting 84.54 | 2
10 | Niko Springer 95.42 | 6
3 | Jonny Clayton 88.61 | 6
Gabriel Clemens 82.86 | 3

Semi-finals (best of 13 legs)
Ian White 91.12 | 5
20 | Andrew Gilding 90.75 | 7
10 | Niko Springer 93.53 | 6
3 | Jonny Clayton 94.31 | 7

Final (best of 15 legs)
20 | Andrew Gilding 99.78 | 8
3 | Jonny Clayton 95.24 | 3

=== Players Championship 17 ===
Players Championship 17 was contested on Monday 18 May 2026 at the Leicester Arena. The tournament was won by Luke Humphries, who defeated Jermaine Wattimena 8–4 in the final.

Quarter-finals (best of 11 legs)
1 | Wessel Nijman 97.99 | 3
9 | Luke Humphries 94.67 | 6
Robert Owen 91.62 | 5
5 | Danny Noppert 90.18 | 6
15 | Dirk van Duijvenbode 99.11 | 4
10 | Kevin Doets 107.53 | 6
3 | Stephen Bunting 92.82 | 3
6 | Jermaine Wattimena 99.89 | 6

Semi-finals (best of 13 legs)
9 | Luke Humphries 102.88 | 7
5 | Danny Noppert 97.89 | 3
10 | Kevin Doets 102.65 | 2
6 | Jermaine Wattimena 111.05 | 7

Final (best of 15 legs)
9 | Luke Humphries 104.89 | 8
6 | Jermaine Wattimena 97.16 | 4

=== Players Championship 18 ===
Players Championship 18 was contested on Tuesday 19 May 2026 at the Leicester Arena. The tournament was won by Luke Woodhouse, who defeated Andrew Gilding 8–4 in the final.

Quarter-finals (best of 11 legs)
Harry Ward 86.13 | 6
9 | Kevin Doets 91.30 | 5
4 | Jonny Clayton 88.49 | 2
12 | Luke Woodhouse 96.00 | 6
15 | Andrew Gilding 95.68 | 6
10 | Niko Springer 92.72 | 2
30 | Sebastian Białecki 95.31 | 5
11 | James Wade 100.55 | 6

Semi-finals (best of 13 legs)
Harry Ward 92.05 | 3
12 | Luke Woodhouse 99.14 | 7
15 | Andrew Gilding 96.03 | 7
11 | James Wade 94.58 | 6

Final (best of 15 legs)
12 | Luke Woodhouse 102.04 | 8
15 | Andrew Gilding 96.96 | 4

== June ==
=== Players Championship 19 ===
Players Championship 19 was contested on Tuesday 2 June 2026 at Arena MK in Milton Keynes. The tournament was won by Jeffrey de Graaf, who defeated Jonny Clayton 8–5 in the final.

Quarter-finals (best of 11 legs)
1 | Wessel Nijman 100.25 | 4
Jeffrey de Graaf 94.73 | 6
Mickey Mansell 90.91 | 4
5 | Luke Woodhouse 90.19 | 6
18 | William O'Connor 93.36 | 5
23 | Rob Cross 96.68 | 6
Cristo Reyes 91.03 | 1
11 | Jonny Clayton 100.44 | 6

Semi-finals (best of 13 legs)
Jeffrey de Graaf 96.11 | 7
5 | Luke Woodhouse 97.06 | 6
23 | Rob Cross 105.97 | 4
11 | Jonny Clayton 111.21 | 7

Final (best of 15 legs)
Jeffrey de Graaf 101.11 | 8
11 | Jonny Clayton 100.69 | 5

=== Players Championship 20 ===
Players Championship 20 was contested on Wednesday 3 June 2026 at Arena MK in Milton Keynes. The tournament was won by Ross Smith, who defeated William O'Connor 8–5 in the final.

Quarter-finals (best of 11 legs)
17 | William O'Connor 89.66 | 6
24 | Dave Chisnall 87.00 | 4
13 | Krzysztof Ratajski 96.76 | 3
28 | Richard Veenstra 94.52 | 6
2 | Ross Smith 91.22 | 6
Andy Boulton 83.86 | 2
19 | Joe Cullen 93.90 | 5
Henry Coates 91.61 | 6

Semi-finals (best of 13 legs)
17 | William O'Connor 95.64 | 7
28 | Richard Veenstra 85.80 | 2
2 | Ross Smith 92.05 | 7
Henry Coates 90.24 | 6

Final (best of 15 legs)
17 | William O'Connor 93.49 | 5
2 | Ross Smith 107.01 | 8

=== Players Championship 21 ===
Players Championship 21 was contested on Tuesday 16 June 2026 at the Robin Park Tennis Centre in Wigan. Wessel Nijman won his sixth Players Championship title of the year by defeating Ryan Searle 8–6 in the final.

Quarter-finals (best of 11 legs)
1 | Wessel Nijman 100.63 | 6
9 | Kevin Doets 91.41 | 1
4 | Chris Dobey 105.09 | 4
Beau Greaves 105.90 | 6
18 | Dirk van Duijvenbode 92.33 | 4
10 | Jonny Clayton 100.31 | 6
14 | Ryan Searle 93.81 | 6
6 | Stephen Bunting 90.14 | 3

Semi-finals (best of 13 legs)
1 | Wessel Nijman 98.29 | 7
Beau Greaves 92.22 | 4
10 | Jonny Clayton 87.78 | 5
14 | Ryan Searle 89.80 | 7

Final (best of 15 legs)
1 | Wessel Nijman 96.56 | 8
14 | Ryan Searle 95.90 | 6

=== Players Championship 22 ===
Players Championship 22 was contested on Wednesday 17 June 2026 at the Robin Park Tennis Centre in Wigan. The tournament was won by Rob Cross, who defeated Maik Kuivenhoven 8–5 in the final.

Quarter-finals (best of 11 legs)
Alexander Merkx 92.69 | 4
24 | Rob Cross 95.98 | 6
Tommy Morris 93.18 | 4
5 | Stephen Bunting 96.95 | 6
Gabriel Clemens 94.22 | 5
Tom Bissell 87.42 | 6
14 | Gian van Veen 90.13 | 3
Maik Kuivenhoven 95.19 | 6

Semi-finals (best of 13 legs)
24 | Rob Cross 102.82 | 7
5 | Stephen Bunting 104.04 | 3
Tom Bissell 83.35 | 6
Maik Kuivenhoven 83.45 | 7

Final (best of 15 legs)
24 | Rob Cross 97.83 | 8
Maik Kuivenhoven 82.53 | 5

== July ==
=== Players Championship 23 ===
Players Championship 23 was contested on Monday 6 July 2026 at the Leicester Arena. The tournament was won by Cameron Menzies, who defeated Cristo Reyes 8–5 in the final.

Quarter-finals (best of 11 legs)
32 | Cristo Reyes 92.88 | 6
Daniel Ayres 91.94 | 4
David Sharp 93.87 | 6
Tom Sykes 96.02 | 4
Charlie Manby 90.86 | 2
26 | Cameron Menzies 96.18 | 6
Christian Kist 93.23 | 3
27 | Dave Chisnall 92.57 | 6

Semi-finals (best of 13 legs)
32 | Cristo Reyes 89.91 | 7
David Sharp 83.34 | 3
26 | Cameron Menzies 94.55 | 7
27 | Dave Chisnall 98.23 | 5

Final (best of 15 legs)
32 | Cristo Reyes 94.78 | 5
26 | Cameron Menzies 95.54 | 8

=== Players Championship 24 ===
Players Championship 24 was contested on Tuesday 7 July 2026 at the Leicester Arena. The tournament was won by Gabriel Clemens, who defeated Luke Woodhouse 8–6 in the final. This was the first PDC title of Clemens' career and came in his seventh appearance in a Players Championship final.

Quarter-finals (best of 11 legs)
Mickey Mansell 80.19 | 1
Gabriel Clemens 92.04 | 6
4 | Chris Dobey 100.95 | 5
Brendan Dolan 102.55 | 6
15 | Gian van Veen 92.28 | 6
Madars Razma 82.80 | 3
3 | Luke Woodhouse 101.33 | 6
6 | Danny Noppert 88.67 | 0

Semi-finals (best of 13 legs)
Gabriel Clemens 100.77 | 7
Brendan Dolan 90.39 | 3
15 | Gian van Veen 83.37 | 5
3 | Luke Woodhouse 86.08 | 7

Final (best of 15 legs)
Gabriel Clemens 94.53 | 8
3 | Luke Woodhouse 96.00 | 6

=== Players Championship 25 ===
Players Championship 25 was contested on Tuesday 28 July 2026 at the Halle 39 in Hildesheim. The tournament was won by Henry Coates, who defeated Damon Heta 8–4 in the final.

Quarter-finals (best of 11 legs)
James Hurrell 79.86 | 0
9 | Niko Springer 80.52 | 6
4 | Kevin Doets 96.52 | 2
12 | Damon Heta 105.05 | 6
Henry Coates 106.09 | 6
Christian Kist 93.46 | 0
19 | Jeffrey de Graaf 99.47 | 6
27 | Max Hopp 92.53 | 1

Semi-finals (best of 13 legs)
9 | Niko Springer 88.10 | 4
12 | Damon Heta 89.38 | 7
Henry Coates 95.76 | 7
19 | Jeffrey de Graaf 94.53 | 3

Final (best of 15 legs)
12 | Damon Heta 106.11 | 4
Henry Coates 104.88 | 8

=== Players Championship 26 ===
Players Championship 26 was contested on Wednesday 29 July 2026 at the Halle 39 in Hildesheim. The tournament was won by Sebastian Białecki, who defeated Mario Vandenbogaerde 8–6 in the final.

Quarter-finals (best of 11 legs)
16 | Karel Sedláček 96.97 | 2
Justin Hood 101.59 | 6
Mario Vandenbogaerde 98.68 | 6
Joe Hunt 95.50 | 5
Ritchie Edhouse 98.57 | 5
7 | Gian van Veen 101.08 | 6
19 | Sebastian Białecki 89.72 | 6
11 | Damon Heta 90.74 | 2

Semi-finals (best of 13 legs)
Justin Hood 93.86 | 4
Mario Vandenbogaerde 93.36 | 7
7 | Gian van Veen 89.88 | 4
19 | Sebastian Białecki 94.01 | 7

Final (best of 15 legs)
Mario Vandenbogaerde 85.91 | 6
19 | Sebastian Białecki 93.80 | 8

== August ==
=== Players Championship 27 ===
Players Championship 27 was contested on Tuesday 25 August 2026 at the Leicester Arena. The tournament was won by Jermaine Wattimena, who defeated Kevin Doets 8–6 in the final.

Quarter-finals (best of 11 legs)
1 | Wessel Nijman 102.81 | 6
25 | Kim Huybrechts 88.20 | 3
4 | Kevin Doets 91.40 | 6
21 | Cameron Menzies 78.93 | 2
2 | Luke Woodhouse 101.97 | 6
Mickey Mansell 97.03 | 2
19 | Luke Littler 95.68 | 5
6 | Jermaine Wattimena 92.36 | 6

Semi-finals (best of 13 legs)
1 | Wessel Nijman 97.31 | 5
4 | Kevin Doets 93.44 | 7
2 | Luke Woodhouse 94.36 | 4
6 | Jermaine Wattimena 100.71 | 7

Final (best of 15 legs)
4 | Kevin Doets 93.22 | 6
6 | Jermaine Wattimena 93.81 | 8

=== Players Championship 28 ===
Players Championship 28 was contested on Wednesday 26 August 2026 at the Leicester Arena. The tournament was won by Luke Humphries, who defeated Brendan Dolan 8–6 in the final.

Quarter-finals (best of 11 legs)
Owen Bates 90.08 | 4
9 | Luke Humphries 92.88 | 6
Mike De Decker 88.05 | 6
21 | Kim Huybrechts 84.98 | 5
2 | Luke Woodhouse 93.42 | 4
Brendan Dolan 86.00 | 6
14 | Luke Littler 100.65 | 6
6 | Krzysztof Ratajski 99.99 | 4

Semi-finals (best of 13 legs)
9 | Luke Humphries 99.97 | 7
Mike De Decker 91.68 | 4
Brendan Dolan 97.63 | 7
14 | Luke Littler 96.42 | 4

Final (best of 15 legs)
9 | Luke Humphries 93.88 | 8
Brendan Dolan 87.31 | 6

== September ==
=== Players Championship 29 ===
Players Championship 29 was contested on Tuesday 22 September 2026 at Maaspoort Den Bosch. The tournament was won by Cameron Menzies, who defeated Gian van Veen 8–4 in the final.

Quarter-finals (best of 11 legs)
17 | Cameron Menzies 97.29 | 6
24 | Jeffrey de Graaf 86.10 | 3
4 | Kevin Doets 104.63 | 6
5 | Jermaine Wattimena 90.61 | 2
Oskar Lukasiak 85.08 | 3
10 | William O'Connor 89.92 | 6
3 | Chris Dobey 100.32 | 5
11 | Gian van Veen 95.69 | 6

Semi-finals (best of 13 legs)
17 | Cameron Menzies 91.32 | 7
4 | Kevin Doets 99.54 | 5
10 | William O'Connor 92.69 | 5
11 | Gian van Veen 95.32 | 7

Final (best of 15 legs)
17 | Cameron Menzies 96.77 | 8
11 | Gian van Veen 89.16 | 4

=== Players Championship 30 ===
Players Championship 30 will be contested on Wednesday 23 September 2026 at Maaspoort Den Bosch. The tournament was won by Karel Sedláček, who defeated Scott Williams 8–7 in the final.

Quarter-finals (best of 11 legs)
16 | Michael van Gerwen 91.17 | 2
Scott Williams 94.01 | 6
Steve Lennon 97.56 | 5
5 | Jermaine Wattimena 96.06 | 6
15 | Niels Zonneveld 93.06 | 6
Raymond van Barneveld 83.56 | 4
3 | Chris Dobey 97.41 | 5
22 | Karel Sedláček 88.56 | 6

Semi-finals (best of 13 legs)
Scott Williams 99.95 | 7
5 | Jermaine Wattimena 90.25 | 4
15 | Niels Zonneveld 97.07 | 2
22 | Karel Sedláček 95.96 | 7

Final (best of 15 legs)
Scott Williams 96.25 | 7
22 | Karel Sedláček 91.92 | 8

== October ==
=== Players Championship 31 ===
Players Championship 31 was contested on Wednesday 28 October 2026 at Maaspoort Den Bosch. The tournament was won by Charlie Manby, who defeated Maik Kuivenhoven 8–2 in the final. This was the first PDC ranking title of Manby's career.

Quarter-finals (best of 11 legs)
16 | Dirk van Duijvenbode 90.41 | 6
24 | Jeffrey de Graaf 91.36 | 5
29 | Maik Kuivenhoven 99.72 | 6
Mike De Decker 85.11 | 2
2 | Kevin Doets 101.28 | 5
26 | Beau Greaves 101.62 | 6
Charlie Manby 98.45 | 6
Alan Soutar 92.76 | 3

Semi-finals (best of 13 legs)
16 | Dirk van Duijvenbode 92.39 | 6
29 | Maik Kuivenhoven 96.30 | 7
26 | Beau Greaves 90.41 | 5
Charlie Manby 89.91 | 7

Final (best of 15 legs)
29 | Maik Kuivenhoven 84.76 | 2
Charlie Manby 99.72 | 8

=== Players Championship 32 ===
Players Championship 32 was contested on Thursday 29 October 2026 at Maaspoort Den Bosch. The tournament was won by Chris Dobey, who defeated Tommy Morris 8–4 in the final.

Quarter-finals (best of 11 legs)
Ricardo Pietreczko 85.35 | 0
Scott Williams 90.18 | 6
Tommy Morris 101.23 | 6
28 | Michael Smith 91.10 | 2
15 | Karel Sedláček 87.16 | 5
10 | William O'Connor 82.43 | 6
3 | Chris Dobey 111.12 | 6
6 | Krzysztof Ratajski 93.60 | 1

Semi-finals (best of 13 legs)
Scott Williams 105.46 | 3
Tommy Morris 106.98 | 7
10 | William O'Connor 100.66 | 4
3 | Chris Dobey 109.68 | 7

Final (best of 15 legs)
Tommy Morris 94.07 | 4
3 | Chris Dobey 103.01 | 8

== November ==
=== Players Championship 33 ===
Players Championship 33 was contested on Wednesday 4 November 2026 at the Leicester Arena. The tournament was won by Luke Humphries, who defeated Niels Zonneveld 8–4 in the final.

Quarter-finals (best of 11 legs)
Gary Anderson 98.16 | 6
Raymond van Barneveld 94.16 | 3
20 | Gerwyn Price 92.90 | 2
12 | Luke Humphries 92.82 | 6
18 | Dirk van Duijvenbode 93.99 | 4
10 | Niels Zonneveld 88.68 | 6
19 | Michael van Gerwen 114.15 | 6
6 | Danny Noppert 96.36 | 0

Semi-finals (best of 13 legs)
Gary Anderson 106.75 | 4
12 | Luke Humphries 104.76 | 7
10 | Niels Zonneveld 93.55 | 7
19 | Michael van Gerwen 101.39 | 5

Final (best of 15 legs)
12 | Luke Humphries 103.77 | 8
10 | Niels Zonneveld 92.50 | 4

=== Players Championship 34 ===
Players Championship 34 was contested on Thursday 5 November 2026 at the Leicester Arena. The tournament was won by Tommy Morris, who defeated Luke Humphries 8–5 in the final.

Quarter-finals (best of 11 legs)
Tommy Morris 93.76 | 6
8 | Jermaine Wattimena 96.74 | 3
29 | Kim Huybrechts 88.41 | 5
21 | Cristo Reyes 92.13 | 6
15 | Michael van Gerwen 98.53 | 3
10 | Luke Humphries 99.96 | 6
Jack Aldridge 99.66 | 6
6 | Danny Noppert 98.07 | 4

Semi-finals (best of 13 legs)
Tommy Morris 97.77 | 7
21 | Cristo Reyes 90.37 | 4
10 | Luke Humphries 100.24 | 7
Jack Aldridge 101.82 | 5

Final (best of 15 legs)
Tommy Morris 95.76 | 8
10 | Luke Humphries 92.43 | 5

== Players Championship Order of Merit ==
The top 64 on the Players Championship Order of Merit will qualify for the 2026 Players Championship Finals:

Prize money in the table is in units of £1,000.

Final Standings

| Rank | Player | Prize money | Rank | Player | Prize money |
|---|---|---|---|---|---|
| 1 | Wessel Nijman (NED) | 160.5 | 33 | Dave Chisnall (ENG) | 51.75 |
| 2 | Chris Dobey (ENG) | 121.75 | 34 | Joe Cullen (ENG) | 49.5 |
| 3 | Kevin Doets (NED) | 113.25 | 35 | Justin Hood (ENG) | 48.75 |
| 4 | Luke Woodhouse (ENG) | 91 | 36 | Max Hopp (GER) | 48.5 |
| 5 | Jermaine Wattimena (NED) | 84.5 | 37 | Brendan Dolan (IRL) | 48.25 |
| 6 | Andrew Gilding (ENG) | 83.25 | 38 | Joe Hunt (ENG) | 48 |
| 7 | Luke Humphries (ENG) | 77 | 39 | Damon Heta (AUS) | 46.75 |
| 8 | Beau Greaves (ENG) | 72 | 40 | Rob Owen (WAL) | 46.25 |
| 9 | Ross Smith (ENG) | 68.5 | 41 | Niko Springer (GER) | 46 |
| 10 | Danny Noppert (NED) | 66.5 | 42 | Tom Sykes (ENG) | 45.75 |
| 11 | Karel Sedláček (CZE) | 66.5 | 43 | Mickey Mansell (IRL) | 45 |
| 12 | William O'Connor (IRL) | 65.75 | 44 | Callan Rydz (ENG) | 42.5 |
| 13 | Sebastian Białecki (POL) | 65.25 | 45 | Gian van Veen (NED) | 42.25 |
| 14 | Dirk van Duijvenbode (NED) | 64.25 | 46 | Daryl Gurney (NIR) | 42 |
| 15 | Cristo Reyes (ESP) | 62.75 | 47 | Connor Scutt (ENG) | 40 |
| 16 | Charlie Manby (ENG) | 60 | 48 | Mensur Suljović (AUT) | 39.25 |
| 17 | Cameron Menzies (SCO) | 59.75 | 49 | Martin Schindler (GER) | 38.75 |
| 18 | Michael van Gerwen (NED) | 59.25 | 50 | Darius Labanauskas (LTU) | 38.75 |
| 19 | Maik Kuivenhoven (NED) | 58.5 | 51 | Alan Soutar (SCO) | 38 |
| 20 | Jeffrey de Graaf (SWE) | 58 | 52 | Gerwyn Price (WAL) | 38 |
| 21 | Tommy Morris (ENG) | 57.25 | 53 | James Hurrell (ENG) | 37.75 |
| 22 | Rob Cross (ENG) | 56.75 | 54 | Gary Anderson (SCO) | 37.5 |
| 23 | Jonny Clayton (WAL) | 55.75 | 55 | Scott Williams (ENG) | 37 |
| 24 | Niels Zonneveld (NED) | 55.25 | 56 | Michael Smith (ENG) | 37 |
| 25 | Tom Bissell (ENG) | 55 | 57 | Christian Kist (NED) | 37 |
| 26 | Krzysztof Ratajski (POL) | 54.75 | 58 | Darryl Pilgrim (ENG) | 36.75 |
| 27 | Kim Huybrechts (BEL) | 54.5 | 59 | Bradley Brooks (ENG) | 35.75 |
| 28 | Ryan Searle (ENG) | 54.5 | 60 | Keane Barry (IRL) | 35.75 |
| 29 | Stephen Bunting (ENG) | 54.25 | 61 | Alexander Merkx (NED) | 35 |
| 30 | James Wade (ENG) | 53 | 62 | Ritchie Edhouse (ENG) | 33.5 |
| 31 | Richard Veenstra (NED) | 51.75 | 63 | Mike De Decker (BEL) | 33.25 |
| 32 | Gabriel Clemens (GER) | 51.75 | 64 | Henry Coates (ENG) | 33.25 |

== Top averages ==
The table lists all players who achieved a three-dart average of at least 110 in a match. In the case one player has multiple records, this is indicated by the number in brackets.

| Number | Player | Average | Event | Round | Result | Ref |
|---|---|---|---|---|---|---|
| 1 | Michael van Gerwen (NED) | 122.34 | 15 | Semi-final | Won | |
| 2 | Andrew Gilding (ENG) | 118.66 | 13 | 3 | Won | |
| 3 | Gerwyn Price (WAL) | 117.12 | 2 | Quarter-final | Won | |
| 4 | Michael van Gerwen (NED) (2) | 114.15 | 33 | Quarter-final | Won | |
| 5 | Kevin Doets (NED) | 113.90 | 29 | 3 | Won | |
| 6 | Martin Schindler (GER) | 113.79 | 15 | 3 | Won | |
| 7 | Wessel Nijman (NED) | 113.37 | 11 | 3 | Won | |
| 8 | Kevin Doets (NED) (2) | 113.05 | 3 | 2 | Won | |
| 9 | Chris Dobey (ENG) | 112.73 | 29 | 2 | Won | |
| 10 | Chris Dobey (ENG) (2) | 112.61 | 34 | 3 | Won | |
| 11 | Niko Springer (GER) | 112.48 | 15 | 1 | Won | |
| 12 | Luke Humphries (ENG) | 112.18 | 17 | 1 | Won | |
| 13 | Charlie Manby (ENG) | 112.16 | 31 | 4 | Won | |
| 14 | Dave Chisnall (ENG) | 111.72 | 8 | 3 | Won | |
| 15 | Chris Dobey (ENG) (3) | 111.33 | 6 | 2 | Won | |
| 16 | Kim Huybrechts (BEL) | 111.33 | 9 | 1 | Won | |
| 17 | Jonny Clayton (WAL) | 111.21 | 19 | Semi-final | Won | |
| 18 | Gerwyn Price (WAL) (2) | 111.14 | 2 | 4 | Won | |
| 19 | Chris Dobey (ENG) (4) | 111.12 | 32 | Quarter-final | Won | |
| 20 | Jermaine Wattimena (NED) | 111.05 | 17 | Semi-final | Won | |
| 21 | Cristo Reyes (ESP) | 111.03 | 22 | 1 | Won | |
| 22 | Josh Rock (NIR) | 110.80 | 9 | 1 | Won | |
| 23 | Damon Heta (AUS) | 110.78 | 14 | 2 | Won | |
| 24 | Cristo Reyes (ESP) (2) | 110.59 | 29 | 1 | Won | |
| 25 | Gary Anderson (SCO) | 110.55 | 11 | 4 | Won | |
| 26 | Chris Dobey (ENG) (5) | 110.44 | 15 | 3 | Won | |
| 27 | Richard Veenstra (NED) | 110.43 | 15 | 3 | Lost | |
| 28 | Scott Williams (ENG) | 110.41 | 30 | 3 | Won | |
| 29 | Kevin Doets (NED) (3) | 110.21 | 18 | 1 | Won | |

== Nine-darters ==
The table below lists all nine-dart finishes hit during the 2026 Players Championship season. In the case one player has multiple nine-darters, this is indicated by the number in brackets.

| Number | Event | Round | Player | Result | Opponent |
|---|---|---|---|---|---|
| 1. | 1 | 2 | (Republic of Ireland) Mickey Mansell | 6 – 1 | Carl Sneyd |
| 2. | 2 | 1 | (England) James Hurrell | 6 – 5 | Maik Kuivenhoven |
| 3. | 2 | 3 | (Germany) Gabriel Clemens | 6 – 3 | Madars Razma |
| 4. | 5 | 2 | (England) Chris Dobey | 6 – 3 | Ricky Evans |
| 5. | 6 | 2 | (England) Beau Greaves | 6 – 5 | Mensur Suljović |
| 6. | 6 | 3 | (Germany) Max Hopp | 4 – 6 | Thibault Tricole |
| 7. | 9 | 3 | (England) Thomas Lovely | 2 – 6 | Luke Woodhouse |
| 8. | 11 | 4 | (Scotland) Gary Anderson | 6 – 1 | Alexander Merkx |
| 9. | 13 | 1 | (Netherlands) Dirk van Duijvenbode | 6 – 3 | Madars Razma |
| 10. | 14 | 2 | (Netherlands) Richard Veenstra | 6 – 4 | Leon Weber |
| 11. | 16 | 2 | (Belgium) Kim Huybrechts | 6 – 1 | Tavis Dudeney |
| 12. | 23 | 2 | (England) Joe Cullen | 3 – 6 | Jack Tweddell |
| 13. | 24 | 4 | (England) Scott Williams | 5 – 6 | Gabriel Clemens |
| 14. | 26 | 1 | (England) Scott Williams (2) | 6 – 3 | Callan Rydz |
| 15. | 27 | 1 | (England) Nathan Aspinall | 6 – 1 | Thibault Tricole |
| 16. | 29 | 1 | (Spain) Cristo Reyes | 6 – 1 | Ian White |
| 17. | 29 | 2 | (Germany) Max Hopp (2) | 6 – 2 | Tom Bissell |
| 18. | 31 | 1 | (Spain) Cristo Reyes (2) | 6 – 1 | Cor Dekker |
| 19. | 32 | 1 | (England) Tom Sykes | 6 – 2 | Cor Dekker |
| 20. | 32 | 1 | (England) Bradley Brooks | 6 – 4 | Adam Gawlas |
| 21. | 32 | 2 | (Netherlands) Wesley Plaisier | 6 – 4 | Damon Heta |
| 22. | 33 | 1 | (England) Tommy Lishman | 6 – 4 | David Sharp |
| 23. | 34 | 3 | (England) Chris Dobey (2) | 6 – 1 | Tom Bissell |
