= Darryl Pilgrim =

English darts player (born 1987)

Personal information
- Nickname: Mr P
- Born: 30 June 1987 (age 39) Croydon, London, England

Sport
- Sport: Darts
- Playing since: 2017
- Darts: 20g Perfect Nine
- Laterality: Right-handed
- Walk-on music: "Glad All Over" by The Dave Clark Five

Organisation (see split in darts)
- PDC: 2017–present (Tour Card: 2025–present)
- Current world ranking: (PDC) 76 (29 October 2026)

PDC premier events – best performances
- UK Open: Last 32: 2026

Other tournament wins
- Years
MODUS Super Series Weekly Winner	2022, 2023, 2024
PDC Challenge Tour	2023

Darryl Pilgrim (born 30 June 1987) is an English professional darts player who competes in Professional Darts Corporation (PDC) events. A PDC Tour Card holder since 2025 Q-School, he is a three-time quarter-finalist in the PDC's Players Championship events.

Before winning his Tour card, Pilgrim won a title on the PDC's secondary tour, the PDC Challenge Tour, in 2023.

== Early life ==
Born on 30 June 1987, Pilgrim is from Croydon, London, England. He started playing darts at the age of eight, inspired by his father also playing darts.

== Career ==
=== 2017–2018 ===
Pilgrim qualified for the 2017 UK Open through the Amateur Qualifiers. Making his debut appearance in a PDC major event, he lost in the first round but qualified for the 2018 UK Open again a year later and reached the third round, where he lost to Steve West in a deciding leg.

=== 2022 ===
Pilgrim played on the 2022 PDC Challenge Tour series, reaching the semi-finals at event thirteen.

He made his Players Championship debut at Players Championship 11, appearing as a call-up due to his ranking on the Challenge Tour Order of Merit. He lost to Brendan Dolan 6–5 in the first round.

Pilgrim reached the semi-finals of MODUS Super Series 1 Champions Week, but lost 4–3 to eventual champion Conan Whitehead.

=== 2023 ===
Pilgrim reached his first PDC Players Championship quarter-final at Players Championship 18.

In August, he won Challenge Tour 16, defeating Andy Boulton 5–1 in the final.

He also competed in the MODUS Super Series. On 15 August, he broke the series' record for a three-dart average with a 122.69 in a 4–0 win against Dennie Olde Kalter. On the same day, he also set the tournament's record for highest losing average, with a 118.88 in a 4–2 defeat to Scott Taylor. Pilgrim also hit a nine-dart finish in this match.

=== 2024 ===
In 2024, Pilgrim again played in Players Championship events, on the 2024 PDC Pro Tour. In May, Pilgrim hit his second career nine-dart finish in his deciding leg loss to Jelle Klaasen at PDC Players Championship 11.

In December, Pilgrim topped his group at the Amateur Darts Circuit's ADC Global Championship. He reached the semi-finals in Week One. He advanced to the Global Finals, where he made the semi-finals before losing to eventual champion Devon Petersen 7–3.

=== 2025 ===
In January, Pilgrim won a PDC Tour Card for the first time at PDC Qualifying School. He entered in stage two of Q-School, virtue of his Challenge Tour Order of Merit ranking, giving him an exemption from stage one. In stage two, he finished second in the UK Q-School of Merit table, earning him his Tour Card.

On 10 February, he reached his second Players Championship quarter-final at Players Championship 1. Two days later, he qualified for his third PDC European Tour event, the 2025 Belgian Darts Open, through the Tour Card Holder Qualifier. He was defeated by Ryan Searle 6–2 in the first round.

On 30 May at the 2025 European Darts Open, Pilgrim achieved a 6–3 victory over Madars Razma in the first round. It was his second win on the European Tour. He lost in a deciding leg to Peter Wright in the second round.

== Personal life ==
Outside of darts, Pilgrim works for Tesco. He is a supporter of Crystal Palace F.C.

== Performance timeline ==
Pilgrim's performance timeline is as follows:

=== PDC ===
Tournament	2017	2018	2023	2024	2025	2026
PDC Ranked televised events
World Masters	Did not qualify				Prel.	Prel.
UK Open	1R	3R	1R	1R	3R	5R

==== European Tour ====
Tournament	2023	2025	2026
European Matchplay	1R	Not held	
German Championship	2R	DNQ	NH
Belgian Open	DNQ	1R	DNQ
European Open	DNQ	2R	DNQ
Poland Open	Not held		2R

==== Players Championships ====
Season	1	2	3	4	5	6	7	8	9	10	11	12	13	14	15	16	17	18	19	20	21	22	23	24	25	26	27	28	29	30	31	32	33	34
2022 (Note: Not a Tour card holder)	Did not participate										BAR; 1R	Did not participate																						
2023	Did not participate								WIG; 3R	WIG; 2R	Did not participate						HIL; 3R	HIL; QF	Did not participate								BAR; 4R	BAR; 2R	BAR; DNP	BAR; DNP				
2024	WIG; 1R	WIG; 1R	LEI; 1R	LEI; 1R	HIL; 1R	HIL; 1R	LEI; 1R	LEI; DNP	HIL; 2R	HIL; 1R	HIL; 1R	HIL; 1R	MIL; 2R	MIL; 1R	MIL; 2R	MIL; 2R	MIL; 2R	MIL; DNP	MIL; DNP	WIG; 2R	WIG; 1R	MIL; DNP	MIL; DNP	WIG; 2R	WIG; 2R	WIG; 1R	WIG; 3R	WIG; 2R	LEI; 2R	LEI; 3R				
2025	WIG; QF	WIG; 1R	ROS; 1R	ROS; 3R	LEI; 1R	LEI; 1R	HIL; 2R	HIL; 3R	LEI; 1R	LEI; 1R	LEI; 1R	LEI; 1R	ROS; 1R	ROS; 1R	HIL; 3R	HIL; 2R	LEI; 2R	LEI; 1R	LEI; 1R	LEI; 1R	LEI; 1R	HIL; 1R	HIL; 1R	MIL; 1R	MIL; 3R	HIL; 2R	HIL; 1R	LEI; 1R	LEI; 4R	LEI; 1R	WIG; 2R	WIG; 2R	WIG; 1R	WIG; 2R
2026	HIL; 1R	HIL; 2R	WIG; QF	WIG; 2R	LEI; 1R	LEI; 3R	LEI; 1R	LEI; 2R	WIG; 1R	WIG; 2R	MIL; 2R	MIL; 4R	HIL; 2R	HIL; 1R	LEI; 3R	LEI; 3R	LEI; 2R	LEI; 2R	MIL; 1R	MIL; 1R	WIG; 2R	WIG; 2R	LEI; 1R	LEI; 2R	HIL; 4R	HIL; 2R	HIL; 3R	HIL; 1R	ROS; 2R	ROS; 1R	ROS; 2R	ROS; 2R	LEI; 1R	LEI; 1R

Performance Table Legend
W	Won the tournament	F	Finalist	SF	Semifinalist	QF	Quarterfinalist	#R; RR; Prel.	Lost in # round Round-robin; Preliminary round	DQ	Disqualified
DNQ	Did not qualify	DNP	Did not participate	WD	Withdrew	NH	Tournament not held	#R; RR; Prel.	Lost in # round Round-robin; Preliminary round	NYF	Not yet founded
