= 2025 European Darts Open =

2025 Elten Safety Shoes European Darts Open

Tournament information
- Dates: 30 May–1 June 2025
- Venue: Ostermann-Arena
- Location: Leverkusen, Germany
- Organisation(s): Professional Darts Corporation (PDC)
- Format: Legs
- Prize fund: £175,000
- Winner's share: £30,000
- High checkout: 170; Andreas Harrysson; Chris Dobey

Champion(s)
- Nathan Aspinall (ENG)

The 2025 European Darts Open (known for sponsorship reasons as the 2025 Elten Safety Shoes European Darts Open) was a professional darts tournament that took place at the Ostermann-Arena, Leverkusen, Germany, from 30 May to 1 June 2025. It was the eight of fourteen PDC European Tour events on the 2025 PDC Pro Tour. It featured a field of 48 players and £175,000 in prize money, with £30,000 going to the winner.

Dave Chisnall was the defending champion after defeating Ross Smith 8–6 in the 2024 final. However, he lost 6–5 to Cameron Menzies in the second round.

Nathan Aspinall won his second European Tour title, also his second of 2025, by beating Damon Heta 8–6 in the final.

== Prize money ==
The prize fund remained at £175,000, with £30,000 to the winner:

Stage (num. of players)		Prize money
Winner	(1)	£30,000
Runner-up	(1)	£12,000
Semi-finalists	(2)	£8,500
Quarter-finalists	(4)	£6,000
Third round losers	(8)	£4,000
Second round losers	(16)	£2,500*
First round losers	(16)	£1,250*
Total	£175,000	

- Pre-qualified players from the Orders of Merit who lose in their first match of the event shall not be credited with prize money on any Order of Merit. A player who qualifies as a qualifier, but later becomes a seed due to the withdrawal of one or more other players shall be credited with their prize money on all Orders of Merit regardless of how far they progress in the event.

== Qualification and format ==
In a change from the previous year, the top 16 on the two-year main PDC Order of Merit ranking were now seeded and entered the tournament in the second round, while the 16 qualifiers from the one-year PDC Pro Tour Order of Merit ranking entered in the first round.

In another change, the 16 Pro Tour Order of Merit qualifiers will be drawn against one of the 16 other qualifiers in the first round.

The seedings were confirmed on 9 May.

The remaining 16 places went to players from four qualifying events – 10 from the Tour Card Holder Qualifier (held on 14 May), four from the Host Nation Qualifier (held on 17 May), one from the Nordic & Baltic Associate Member Qualifier (held on 9 May), and one from the East European Associate Member Qualifier (held on 16 February).

Rob Cross, Luke Humphries and Michael van Gerwen withdrew and were replaced by Madars Razma, William O'Connor and Matt Campbell. Michael Smith, Mike De Decker and Gian van Veen moved up to become the 14th, 15th and 16th seeds respectively.

The following players took part in the tournament:

Seeded Players

1. Stephen Bunting (quarter-finals)
2. Jonny Clayton (semi-finals)
3. Damon Heta (runner-up)
4. Chris Dobey (quarter-finals)
5. Nathan Aspinall (champion)
6. James Wade (third round)
7. Dave Chisnall (second round)
8. Peter Wright (third round)
9. Gary Anderson (second round)
10. Danny Noppert (second round)
11. Ross Smith (second round)
12. Martin Schindler (second round)
13. Ryan Searle (second round)
14. Michael Smith (second round)
15. Mike De Decker (third round)
16. Gian van Veen (second round)

Pro Tour Order of Merit Qualifiers
- Cameron Menzies (quarter-finals)
- Wessel Nijman (semi-finals)
- Dirk van Duijvenbode (first round)
- Andrew Gilding (third round)
- Daryl Gurney (third round)
- Luke Woodhouse (second round)
- Raymond van Barneveld (first round)
- Jermaine Wattimena (second round)
- Joe Cullen (first round)
- Ritchie Edhouse (third round)
- Ryan Joyce (second round)
- Niels Zonneveld (first round)
- Ricardo Pietreczko (third round)
- Madars Razma (first round)

Tour Card Qualifier
- Lukas Wenig (second round)
- Brendan Dolan (first round)
- Richard Veenstra (first round)
- Bradley Brooks (second round)
- Niko Springer (second round)
- Darryl Pilgrim (second round)
- Mickey Mansell (second round)
- Ricky Evans (first round)
- Alan Soutar (first round)
- Kim Huybrechts (first round)

Host Nation Qualifier
- Kevin Knopf (first round)
- Dragutin Horvat (first round)
- Moritz Bohrmann (first round)
- Joshua Hermann (first round)

Nordic & Baltic Qualifier
- Andreas Harrysson (third round)

East European Qualifier
- Petr Křivka (first round)

Reserve List
- William O'Connor (first round)
- Matt Campbell (quarter-finals)

== Draw ==
First round (best of 11 legs); 30 May
Luke Woodhouse 94.49	6
Dragutin Horvat 91.44	2
Daryl Gurney 97.06	6
Richard Veenstra 91.55	2
Madars Razma 83.81	3
Darryl Pilgrim 90.68	6
Wessel Nijman 94.37	6
Brendan Dolan 89.84	3
Dirk van Duijvenbode 80.58	1
Niko Springer 88.49	6
Andrew Gilding 97.28	6
Kevin Knopf 77.49	1
Joe Cullen 91.85	5
Bradley Brooks 93.13	6
Ricardo Pietreczko 89.88	6
Moritz Bohrmann 80.65	2
Jermaine Wattimena 96.97	6
Joshua Hermann 77.55	0
Ryan Joyce 95.04	6
Ricky Evans 85.26	3
Cameron Menzies 93.80	6
Kim Huybrechts 94.90	4
Ritchie Edhouse 90.99	6
Petr Křivka 81.17	2
William O'Connor 88.12	5
Mickey Mansell 89.33	6
Raymond van Barneveld 92.84	3
Andreas Harrysson 94.44	6
Niels Zonneveld 89.17	5
Lukas Wenig 89.15	6
Matt Campbell 82.93	6
Alan Soutar 88.85	4

Second round (best of 11 legs); 31 May
1	Stephen Bunting 100.88	6
Luke Woodhouse 94.31	3
16	Gian van Veen 102.93	2
Daryl Gurney 107.20	6
8	Peter Wright 91.56	6
Darryl Pilgrim 92.75	5
9	Gary Anderson 95.05	4
Wessel Nijman 89.07	6
4	Chris Dobey 91.27	6
Niko Springer 91.61	5
13	Ryan Searle 89.74	5
Andrew Gilding 88.88	6
5	Nathan Aspinall 89.59	6
Bradley Brooks 85.82	4
12	Martin Schindler 92.58	4
Ricardo Pietreczko 95.45	6
2	Jonny Clayton 98.45	6
Jermaine Wattimena 99.02	4
15	Mike De Decker 101.39	6
Ryan Joyce 88.79	3
7	Dave Chisnall 95.05	5
Cameron Menzies 96.15	6
10	Danny Noppert 89.92	2
Ritchie Edhouse 102.82	6
3	Damon Heta 92.98	6
Mickey Mansell 85.39	2
14	Michael Smith 91.90	1
Andreas Harrysson 106.00	6
6	James Wade 95.94	6
Lukas Wenig 89.31	0
11	Ross Smith 92.20	2
Matt Campbell 94.28	6

Third round (best of 11 legs); 1 June
1	Bunting 99.49	6
Gurney 91.69	5
8	Wright 92.00	4
Nijman 96.28	6
4	Dobey 110.84	6
Gilding 100.27	3
5	Aspinall 92.42	6
Pietreczko 91.78	3
2	Clayton 98.02	6
15	De Decker 86.00	0
Menzies 93.86	6
Edhouse 97.18	3
3	Heta 97.64	6
Harrysson 91.85	4
6	Wade 96.48	3
Campbell 95.25	6

Quarter-finals (best of 11 legs); 1 June
1	Bunting 92.86	5
Nijman 89.88	6
4	Dobey 94.55	5
5	Aspinall 94.36	6
2	Clayton 88.41	6
Menzies 84.89	3
3	Heta 96.22	6
Campbell 95.19	5

Semi-finals (best of 13 legs); 1 June
Nijman 99.36	6
5	Aspinall 103.10	7
2	Clayton 102.09	3
3	Heta 102.51	7

Final (best of 15 legs); 1 June
5	Aspinall 100.43	8
3	Heta 97.17	6
