= 2025 Belgian Darts Open =

Darts tournament

2025 Lecot Belgian Darts Open

Tournament information
- Dates: 7–9 March 2025
- Venue: Oktoberhallen
- Location: Wieze, Belgium
- Organisation(s): Professional Darts Corporation (PDC)
- Format: Legs; Final – first to 8 legs
- Prize fund: £175,000
- Winner's share: £30,000
- High checkout: 170; Matt Campbell; Martin Schindler; Luke Woodhouse; Mike De Decker; Luke Littler

Champion(s)
- Luke Littler (ENG)

The 2025 Belgian Darts Open, known as the 2025 Lecot Belgian Darts Open for sponsorship reasons, was a professional darts tournament that took place at the Oktoberhallen in Wieze, Belgium from 7 to 9 March 2025. It was the first of fourteen PDC European Tour events on the 2025 PDC Pro Tour. It featured a field of 48 players and £175,000 in prize money, with £30,000 going to the winner.

Luke Littler was the defending champion after defeating Rob Cross 8–7 in the 2024 final.

Littler retained the title by defeating Belgium's Mike De Decker 8–5 in the final.

== Prize money ==
The prize fund remained at £175,000, with £30,000 to the winner:

Stage (num. of players)		Prize money
Winner	(1)	£30,000
Runner-up	(1)	£12,000
Semi-finalists	(2)	£8,500
Quarter-finalists	(4)	£6,000
Last 16 (third round) losers	(8)	£4,000
Last 32 (second round) losers	(16)	£2,500*
Last 48 (first round) losers	(16)	£1,250*
Total	£175,000	

- Pre-qualified players from the Orders of Merit who lose in their first match of the event shall not be credited with prize money on any Order of Merit. A player who qualifies as a qualifier, but later becomes a seed due to the withdrawal of one or more other players shall be credited with their prize money on all Orders of Merit regardless of how far they progress in the event.

== Qualification and format ==
In a change from the previous year, the top 16 on the two-year main PDC Order of Merit ranking were now seeded and entered the tournament in the second round, while the 16 qualifiers from the one-year PDC Pro Tour Order of Merit ranking entered in the first round. The seedings were confirmed on 7 February.

The remaining 16 places went to players from four qualifying events – 10 from the Tour Card Holder Qualifier (held on 12 February), four from the Host Nation Qualifier (held on 6 March), one from the Nordic & Baltic Associate Member Qualifier (held on 14 February), and one from the East European Associate Member Qualifier (held on 1 February).

The following players took part in the tournament:

Seeded Players

1. Luke Humphries (second round)
2. Luke Littler (champion)
3. Michael van Gerwen (second round)
4. Rob Cross (second round)
5. Stephen Bunting (quarter-finals)
6. Jonny Clayton (quarter-finals)
7. Dave Chisnall (quarter-finals)
8. Damon Heta (third round)
9. Gerwyn Price (quarter-finals)
10. Nathan Aspinall (second round)
11. Chris Dobey (second round)
12. Danny Noppert (second round)
13. Peter Wright (second round)
14. James Wade (semi-finals)
15. Gary Anderson (second round)
16. Dimitri Van den Bergh (second round)

Pro Tour Order of Merit Qualifiers
- Ryan Searle (second round)
- Josh Rock (first round)
- Martin Schindler (third round)
- Ross Smith (semi-finals)
- Daryl Gurney (third round)
- Gian van Veen (second round)
- Raymond van Barneveld (second round)
- Cameron Menzies (first round)
- Mike De Decker (runner-up)
- Michael Smith (second round)
- Wessel Nijman (second round)
- Ritchie Edhouse (third round)
- Jermaine Wattimena (second round)
- Dirk van Duijvenbode (third round)
- Ricardo Pietreczko (second round)
- Luke Woodhouse (third round)

Tour Card Qualifier
- Cam Crabtree (first round)
- Thomas Lovely (first round)
- Ryan Joyce (first round)
- Thibault Tricole (first round)
- Matthew Dennant (first round)
- Darryl Pilgrim (first round)
- Jim Long (first round)
- Matt Campbell (third round)
- James Hurrell (first round)
- Owen Bates (first round)
Host Nation Qualifier
- Sybren Gijbels (first round)
- Cedric Waegemans (first round)
- Patrick De Backer (first round)
- François Schweyen (first round)
Nordic & Baltic Qualifier
- Darius Labanauskas (first round)
East European Qualifier
- Boris Krčmar (third round)

== Summary ==
=== First round ===
In the first round, 2024 World Grand Prix winner Mike De Decker avoided an early exit on home soil, surviving two match darts from Thomas Lovely to win 6–5. This victory set up a second-round tie against world number one Luke Humphries – a rematch of the World Grand Prix final; De Decker jokingly commented that he “might ask Luke if we can play double-in double-out”, in reference to the World Grand Prix’s format. Michael Smith also survived a match dart in his 6–5 victory over Ryan Joyce. Recent UK Open semi-finalist Josh Rock was eliminated by Boris Krčmar, who claimed five consecutive legs to win the match 6–3. Ryan Searle defeated Darryl Pilgrim 6–2 to set up a clash with defending Belgian Darts Open champion and reigning world champion Luke Littler.

=== Second round ===
In the second round, the 16 seeded players entered the tournament. Luke Littler began his defence of his Belgian Darts Open title by defeating Ryan Searle 6–3, setting up a match in the third round against Luke Woodhouse, who dispatched of Gary Anderson 6–2. Gerwyn Price celebrated his 40th birthday with the Belgian crowd as he averaged 112.42 in a 6–2 victory over Gian van Veen. Price praised Van Veen post-match, saying he (Price) “needs to play those sort of averages to win”. Damon Heta whitewashed Michael Smith 6–0 to set up a meeting with Price in the third round. Stephen Bunting returned to form after five consecutive defeats in the Premier League with a 6–3 win against Jermaine Wattimena. Four of the top 10 seeds were eliminated in the second round. World number three Michael van Gerwen suffered a surprise 6–4 loss to Boris Krčmar. World number one Luke Humphries was beaten by home favourite Mike De Decker 6–4, with De Decker becoming the only Belgian player to advance to the final day. He thanked his supporters in Wieze: “The fans are really supportive for all the Belgian players, so to reach the Sunday is an amazing feeling.” Premier League players Rob Cross and Nathan Aspinall were eliminated by Ross Smith and Ritchie Edhouse respectively.

=== Final day ===
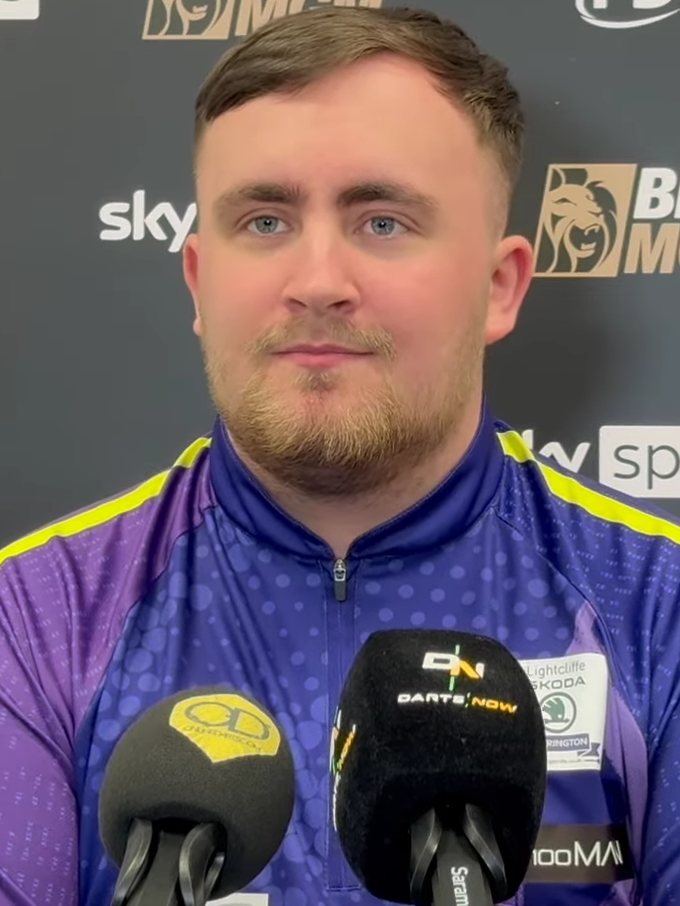
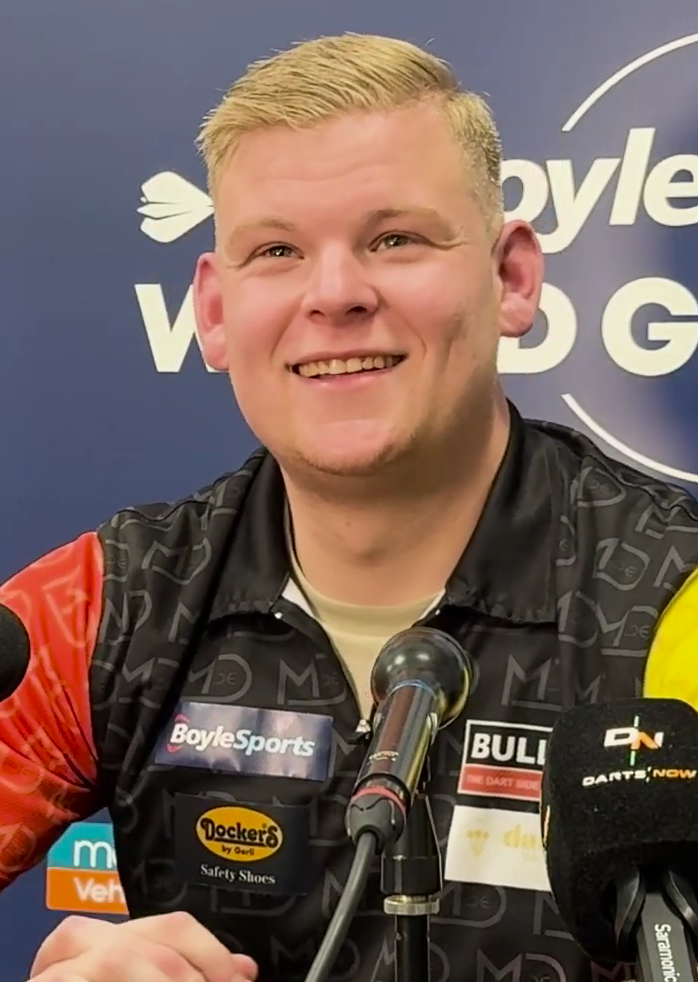
World champion Luke Littler and 2024 World Grand Prix champion Mike De Decker contested the final.

The final day of action saw Mike De Decker and Luke Littler reach the final. De Decker – who had previously never gone past the quarter-finals of a European Tour event – defeated Martin Schindler 6–3 in his third-round match before a 6–4 win over Gerwyn Price in the quarter-finals, producing a 170 checkout in the latter. He then came back from 6–4 down to beat Ross Smith 7–6 and advance to the final, surviving a match dart from Smith in the process. Littler reached the final by defeating Luke Woodhouse 6–4, Dave Chisnall 6–4 and James Wade 7–3.

In the final, Littler took a 3–1 lead by breaking De Decker's throw, but the Belgian reduced the gap to 3–2 by winning the next leg in 15 darts. Littler took a two-leg advantage again but De Decker then produced a 115 checkout to tighten the gap once more. Littler took control of the match and established a 7–3 lead. Despite De Decker staging a comeback by claiming the next two legs, Littler hit a single 10 instead of attempting a 170 checkout to leave double 20, which he hit to triumph 8–3 and retain his title. Littler averaged 102.87 in the final. He won his third European Tour title in what was his third tournament victory in eight days, after winning the 2025 UK Open followed by a nightly Premier League win in Brighton. Littler stated that he was happy to come back to Wieze and win back-to-back Belgium Darts Open titles, while De Decker expressed his sadness in defeat but praised Littler's ability, saying: "He's special."

== Draw ==
The draw was announced on 6 March. Numbers to the left of players' names show the seedings for the top 16 in the tournament. The figures to the right of a player's name state their three-dart average in a match. Players in bold denote match winners.

**First round** (best of 11 legs); 7 March
**Mike De Decker 86.33**	**6**
Thomas Lovely 81.68	5
**Martin Schindler 87.80**	**6**
Jim Long 86.09	3
**Michael Smith 97.84**	**6**
Ryan Joyce 98.26	5
**Gian van Veen 96.12**	**6**
James Hurrell 91.60	4
**Ross Smith 92.48**	**6**
Sybren Gijbels 86.87	5
Cameron Menzies 97.24	5
**Matt Campbell 96.75**	**6**
**Jermaine Wattimena 91.91**	**6**
Patrick De Backer 82.90	2
**Daryl Gurney 105.99**	**6**
Thibault Tricole 86.19	1
**Ryan Searle 98.16**	**6**
Darryl Pilgrim 85.25	2
**Luke Woodhouse 88.47**	**6**
Cedric Waegemans 87.84	4
**Ricardo Pietreczko 88.26**	**6**
Matthew Dennant 86.69	5
**Ritchie Edhouse 98.06**	**6**
Owen Bates 97.01	4
Josh Rock 99.69	3
**Boris Krčmar 95.68**	**6**
**Raymond van Barneveld 91.70**	**6**
Cam Crabtree 88.86	4
**Wessel Nijman 86.64**	**6**
François Schweyen 84.12	5
**Dirk van Duijvenbode 98.04**	**6**
Darius Labanauskas 89.62	4

**Second round** (best of 11 legs); 8 March
1	Luke Humphries 92.61	4
**Mike De Decker 100.45**	**6**
16	Dimitri Van den Bergh 88.69	3
**Martin Schindler 96.46**	**6**
**8**	**Damon Heta 94.93**	**6**
Michael Smith 80.32	0
**9**	**Gerwyn Price 112.42**	**6**
Gian van Veen 105.03	2
4	Rob Cross 98.80	2
**Ross Smith 112.60**	**6**
13	Peter Wright 95.77	2
**Matt Campbell 92.47**	**6**
**5**	**Stephen Bunting 95.61**	**6**
Jermaine Wattimena 93.78	3
12	Danny Noppert 90.77	2
**Daryl Gurney 92.21**	**6**
**2**	**Luke Littler 94.36**	**6**
Ryan Searle 95.48	3
15	Gary Anderson 95.61	2
**Luke Woodhouse 100.10**	**6**
**7**	**Dave Chisnall 90.40**	**6**
Ricardo Pietreczko 83.79	3
10	Nathan Aspinall 98.30	5
**Ritchie Edhouse 94.08**	**6**
3	Michael van Gerwen 93.86	4
**Boris Krčmar 94.29**	**6**
**14**	**James Wade 88.91**	**6**
Raymond van Barneveld 90.28	4
**6**	**Jonny Clayton 92.83**	**6**
Wessel Nijman 99.24	5
11	Chris Dobey 89.95	5
**Dirk van Duijvenbode 90.60**	**6**

**Third round** (best of 11 legs); 9 March
**De Decker 102.81**	**6**
Schindler 98.40	3
8	Heta 90.67	3
**9**	**Price 101.30**	**6**
**R Smith 99.59**	**6**
Campbell 100.88	4
**5**	**Bunting 100.34**	**6**
Gurney 98.39	2
**2**	**Littler 101.81**	**6**
Woodhouse 96.94	4
**7**	**Chisnall 90.71**	**6**
Edhouse 97.93	5
Krčmar 89.34	4
**14**	**Wade 87.11**	**6**
**6**	**Clayton 96.61**	**6**
van Duijvenbode 95.52	5

**Quarter-finals** (best of 11 legs); 9 March
**De Decker 97.66**	**6**
9	Price 97.98	4
**R Smith 89.63**	**6**
5	Bunting 87.68	5
**2**	**Littler 103.91**	**6**
7	Chisnall 91.27	4
**14**	**Wade 90.62**	**6**
6	Clayton 92.30	4

**Semi-finals** (best of 13 legs); 9 March
**De Decker 96.95**	**7**
R Smith 95.50	6
**2**	**Littler 103.50**	**7**
14	Wade 92.64	3

**Final** (best of 15 legs); 9 March
De Decker 92.25	5
**2**	**Littler 102.87**	**8**

== Top averages ==
The table lists all players who achieved an average of at least 100 in a match. In the case one player has multiple records, this is indicated by the number in brackets.

#	Player	Round	Average	Result
1	Ross Smith	2	112.60	Won
2	Gerwyn Price	2	112.42	Won
3	Daryl Gurney	1	105.99	Won
4	Gian van Veen	2	105.03	Lost
5	Luke Littler	Quarter-Final	103.91	Won
6	Luke Littler (2)	Semi-Final	103.50	Won
7	Luke Littler (3)	Final	102.87	Won
8	Mike De Decker	3	102.81	Won
9	Luke Littler (4)	3	101.81	Won
10	Gerwyn Price (2)	3	101.30	Won
11	Matt Campbell	3	100.88	Lost
12	Mike De Decker (2)	2	100.45	Won
13	Stephen Bunting	3	100.34	Won
14	Luke Woodhouse	2	100.10	Won
