= Luke Woodhouse =

English darts player (born 1988)

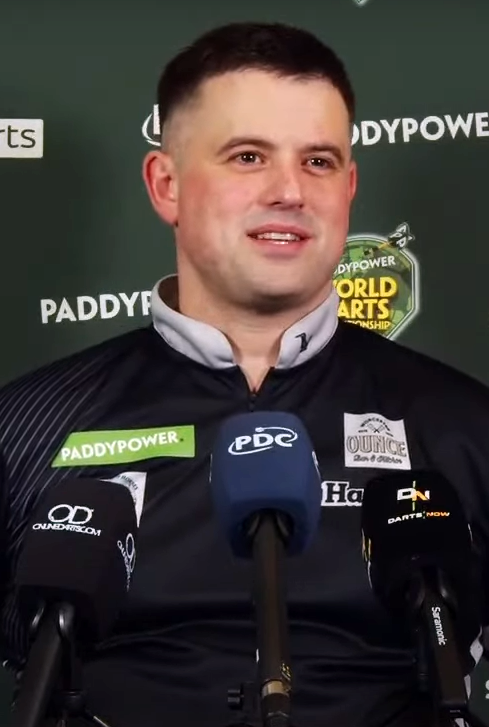
- Woodhouse at the 2025 World Championship

Personal information
- Nickname: "Woody"
- Born: 13 October 1988 (age 38) Bewdley, Worcestershire, England

Sport
- Sport: Darts
- Playing since: 2008
- Darts: 22g Harrows Signature
- Laterality: Right-handed
- Walk-on music: "C'est la Vie" by Stereophonics

Organisation (see split in darts)
- PDC: 2011–present (Tour Card: 2018–present)
- Current world ranking: (PDC) 17 (5 November 2026)

PDC premier events – best performances
- World Championship: Last 16: 2025, 2026
- World Matchplay: Last 32: 2024, 2025, 2026
- World Grand Prix: Last 16: 2023, 2025, 2026
- UK Open: Last 16: 2024
- Grand Slam: Last 16: 2025
- European Championship: Semi-final: 2024
- PC Finals: Quarter-final: 2023
- Masters: Last 16: 2026
- World Series Finals: Last 32: 2025

Other tournament wins
- Years
Baltic Sea Darts Open	2026
PDC Challenge Tour	2013
PDC Players Championship 18	2026

Luke Woodhouse (born 13 October 1988) is an English professional darts player who competes in Professional Darts Corporation (PDC) events. A professional since 2018, Woodhouse reached his first major semi-final at the 2024 European Championship, having previously reached the quarter-finals of the 2023 Players Championship Finals. He reached the last 16 of the PDC World Championship in both 2025 and 2026. After finishing as the runner-up at four ranking events on the PDC Pro Tour, Woodhouse won his first PDC ranking title at Players Championship 18 in May 2026, followed by his first European Tour title at the Baltic Sea Darts Open twelve days later.

== Career ==
In 2013, his first year in the PDC, Luke Woodhouse won PDC Challenge Tour 14. He qualified for the 2015 UK Open, his first appearance at a PDC major event.

He made his debut on the European Tour in May 2017. In 2018, he was able to earn a tour card at Q-School and several times reached the Pro Tour last 16. He reached the last 32 at the 2019 UK Open. On the 2019 PDC Pro Tour, he reached the quarter-finals at Players Championship 18. This helped him qualify the 2019 Players Championship Finals, where he beat defending champion Daryl Gurney 6–5 in the first round, but then lost to Gabriel Clemens.

Woodhouse qualified for the 2020 PDC World Championship via the PDC Pro Tour Order of Merit. After a 3–0 win against Paul Lim, he defeated 4th seed Michael Smith 3–1. He then lost to Dimitri Van den Bergh 4–2. At the 2020 Players Championship Finals he reached the last 16. He hit a nine-dart finish against Danny Noppert at Players Championship 4.

Woodhouse made his first PDC European Tour quarter-final at the 2023 Hungarian Darts Trophy, beating former world champions Rob Cross and Peter Wright before being whitewashed by Luke Humphries 6–0. This run took him into the Pro Tour Order of Merit qualifying spots for the 2023 World Grand Prix. He made his World Grand Prix debut and was able to defeat Dave Chisnall, who had been considered one of the favourites for the title. However, Woodhouse was whitewashed 3-0 by eventual champion Luke Humphries in the second round. At the 2023 Players Championship Finals he reached his first major quarter-final. These include wins over Simon Whitlock, Rob Cross and Chisnall again, before he lost to Gabriel Clemens. He hit another nine-darter at Players Championship 24 against Richie Burnett.

In 2024, Woodhouse qualified for the World Matchplay for the first time. However, Woodhouse lost 10–8 to Nathan Aspinall in the first round. At the 2024 European Championship, Woodhouse reached a first major televised semi-final, losing to eventual winner Ritchie Edhouse 11–5.

At the 2025 World Championship, Woodhouse opened his campaign with a 3–0 win against Lourence Ilagan, followed by a 3–1 upset victory over Mike De Decker, the 2024 World Grand Prix champion. He reached the last 16 of the tournament for the first time, coming back from 3–1 behind to defeat Damon Heta 4–3 in the third round. He was eliminated following a 4–0 loss to Stephen Bunting. At the 2025 European Darts Grand Prix, Woodhouse reached the semi-finals, where he lost 7–3 to Andrew Gilding. Later in the year, at the 2025 Swiss Darts Trophy, he reached his first European Tour final, losing 8–3 to Bunting. In October 2025, he reached the final of Players Championship 34, where he was defeated 8–5 by Wessel Nijman.

Woodhouse reached the last 16 for a second straight year at the 2026 World Championship, beating Andrew Gilding 4–1 in the third round. He lost 4–2 to Krzysztof Ratajski after missing a double to complete a nine-dart finish in the third set. In May 2026, he reached the final of Players Championship 13, losing 8–5 to Kevin Doets. Later that month, he achieved his first PDC ranking title by winning Players Championship 18, defeating Gilding 8–4 in the final. At the Baltic Sea Darts Open twelve days later, Woodhouse reached his second European Tour final, where he beat Ryan Joyce 8–4 to claim his second ranking title. He was also a finalist at Players Championship 24, losing 8–6 to Gabriel Clemens.

== World Championship results ==
=== PDC ===
- 2020: Third round (lost to Dimitri Van den Bergh 2–4)
- 2021: First round (lost to Jamie Lewis 2–3)
- 2022: Second round (lost to Damon Heta 1–3)
- 2023: Second round (lost to Gerwyn Price 1–3)
- 2024: First round (lost to Berry van Peer 2–3)
- 2025: Fourth round (lost to Stephen Bunting 0–4)
- 2026: Fourth round (lost to Krzysztof Ratajski 2–4)

== Performance timeline ==
Woodhouse's performance timeline is as follows:

Tournament	2015	2019	2020	2021	2022	2023	2024	2025	2026
PDC Ranked televised events
World Championship	DNQ		3R	1R	2R	2R	1R	4R	4R
World Masters (Note: A non-ranked event until 2025)	Did not qualify							Prel.	2R
UK Open	1R	5R	3R	5R	4R	5R	6R	4R	4R
World Matchplay	Did not qualify						1R	1R	1R
World Grand Prix	Did not qualify					2R	1R	2R	2R
European Championship	Did not qualify						SF	1R	QF
Grand Slam	Did not qualify				RR	DNQ		2R	RR
Players Championship Finals	DNQ	2R	3R	1R	DNQ	QF	1R	2R	
PDC Non-ranked televised events
World Series Finals	Did not qualify							1R	DNQ
Career statistics
Year-end ranking	202	69	48	47	49	38	35	21	

=== PDC European Tour ===
Season	1	2	3	4	5	6	7	8	9	10	11	12	13	14	15
2017	DNQ			EDG; 1R	Did not qualify						IDO; 1R	EDT; DNQ			
2018	EDO; 2R	GDG; DNQ	GDO; 1R	Did not qualify									EDT; 1R		
2019	Did not qualify						DDM; 1R	DDO; 1R	DNQ			IDO; 2R	GDT; DNQ		
2020	BDC; 1R	GDC; DNQ	EDG; 1R	IDO; DNQ											
2022	IDO; 2R	GDC; DNQ	GDG; 1R	ADO; DNQ	EDO; 2R	CDO; DNQ	EDG; 1R	DDC; DNQ	EDM; 3R	HDT; DNQ	GDO; 3R	DNQ			
2023	BSD; DNQ	EDO; 1R	DNQ		ADO; 2R	Did not qualify				EDM; 1R	GDO; 2R	HDT; QF	GDC; DNQ		
2024	BDO; 2R	GDG; 2R	IDO; 1R	EDG; 2R	ADO; DNQ	BSD; 2R	DDC; QF	EDO; 2R	GDC; 1R	FDT; QF	HDT; 1R	SDT; 1R	CDO; 2R		
2025	BDO; 3R	EDT; 2R	IDO; 2R	GDG; 1R	ADO; 2R	EDG; SF	DDC; 1R	EDO; 2R	BSD; 2R	FDT; QF	CDO; 1R	HDT; 2R	SDT; F	GDC; 2R	
2026	PDO; 3R	EDT; 2R	BDO; 2R	GDG; 2R	EDG; DNP	ADO; QF	IDO; 2R	BSD; W	SDO; 2R	EDO; QF	HDT; 2R	CDO; 3R	FDT; 3R	SDT; 2R	DDC; QF

=== PDC Players Championships ===
Season	1	2	3	4	5	6	7	8	9	10	11	12	13	14	15	16	17	18	19	20	21	22	23	24	25	26	27	28	29	30	31	32	33	34
2015 (Note: Not a Tour card holder)	BAR; 2R	BAR; 1R	BAR; 2R	BAR; 1R	BAR; 1R	COV; 2R	COV; 2R	COV; 1R	CRA; 1R	CRA; 1R	BAR; 2R	BAR; 1R	WIG; 1R	WIG; 1R	BAR; 1R	BAR; 1R	DUB; 1R	DUB; 1R	COV; 1R	COV; 1R														
2017	Did not participate											MIL; 1R	WIG; DNP		BAR; 1R	BAR; 1R	BAR; 2R	BAR; 1R	DUB; 1R	DUB; 2R	BAR; DNP													
2018	BAR; 2R	BAR; 4R	BAR; 2R	BAR; 4R	MIL; 2R	MIL; 1R	BAR; 2R	BAR; 1R	WIG; 1R	WIG; 3R	MIL; 1R	MIL; 4R	WIG; 1R	WIG; 3R	BAR; 1R	BAR; 1R	BAR; 2R	BAR; 3R	DUB; 1R	DUB; 1R	BAR; 1R	BAR; 1R												
2019	WIG; 1R	WIG; 1R	WIG; 2R	WIG; 3R	BAR; 3R	BAR; 1R	WIG; 2R	WIG; 4R	BAR; 1R	BAR; 4R	BAR; 3R	BAR; 1R	BAR; 3R	BAR; 1R	BAR; DNP	BAR; 3R	WIG; 2R	WIG; QF	BAR; 2R	BAR; 1R	HIL; 1R	HIL; 2R	BAR; 1R	BAR; 2R	BAR; 2R	BAR; 2R	DUB; 3R	DUB; 1R	BAR; 1R	BAR; 1R				
2020	BAR; 2R	BAR; 2R	WIG; 1R	WIG; 2R	WIG; 2R	WIG; 2R	BAR; 2R	BAR; QF	MIL; 1R	MIL; 2R	MIL; 2R	MIL; 1R	MIL; 2R	NIE; 3R	NIE; 1R	NIE; 1R	NIE; 1R	NIE; 1R	COV; 2R	COV; 3R	COV; 1R	COV; 1R	COV; 3R											
2021	BOL; 1R	BOL; 2R	BOL; 2R	BOL; 1R	MIL; 3R	MIL; 1R	MIL; 4R	MIL; 4R	NIE; 2R	NIE; 2R	NIE; 1R	NIE; 2R	MIL; 2R	MIL; 4R	MIL; 1R	MIL; 3R	COV; 1R	COV; 2R	COV; 2R	COV; 3R	BAR; 2R	BAR; QF	BAR; 3R	BAR; 1R	BAR; 1R	BAR; QF	BAR; 1R	BAR; 3R	BAR; 1R	BAR; 2R				
2022	BAR; 2R	BAR; 2R	WIG; 1R	WIG; 2R	BAR; 2R	BAR; 1R	NIE; 2R	NIE; 3R	BAR; 1R	BAR; 3R	BAR; 1R	BAR; 1R	BAR; 1R	WIG; 1R	WIG; 1R	NIE; 2R	NIE; 1R	BAR; 1R	BAR; 2R	BAR; 3R	BAR; 3R	BAR; 1R	BAR; 1R	BAR; 2R	BAR; 1R	BAR; 2R	BAR; 1R	BAR; 3R	BAR; 4R	BAR; 1R				
2023	BAR; 2R	BAR; 2R	BAR; 2R	BAR; 1R	BAR; 3R	BAR; 2R	HIL; 2R	HIL; QF	WIG; 2R	WIG; 4R	LEI; 3R	LEI; 1R	HIL; 3R	HIL; F	LEI; 3R	LEI; 2R	HIL; 2R	HIL; 3R	BAR; 2R	BAR; 1R	BAR; 2R	BAR; 1R	BAR; 4R	BAR; 4R	BAR; 3R	BAR; 2R	BAR; 2R	BAR; QF	BAR; 1R	BAR; 2R				
2024	WIG; 2R	WIG; 1R	LEI; 2R	LEI; 3R	HIL; 1R	HIL; 1R	LEI; SF	LEI; 2R	HIL; QF	HIL; 1R	HIL; 3R	HIL; 1R	MIL; 1R	MIL; 2R	MIL; 1R	MIL; 2R	MIL; 3R	MIL; 2R	MIL; 3R	WIG; 1R	WIG; 2R	MIL; 1R	MIL; 1R	WIG; 1R	WIG; 1R	WIG; SF	WIG; 4R	WIG; 1R	LEI; 3R	LEI; 3R				
2025	WIG; QF	WIG; 3R	ROS; 2R	ROS; 3R	LEI; 1R	LEI; 3R	HIL; 3R	HIL; 2R	LEI; 1R	LEI; 1R	LEI; 4R	LEI; QF	ROS; 2R	ROS; 3R	HIL; 2R	HIL; SF	LEI; 1R	LEI; 1R	LEI; 1R	LEI; 4R	LEI; 1R	HIL; 3R	HIL; 2R	MIL; 3R	MIL; 1R	HIL; 3R	HIL; 3R	LEI; 1R	LEI; 2R	LEI; 4R	WIG; 1R	WIG; 2R	WIG; 4R	WIG; F
2026	HIL; 2R	HIL; 4R	WIG; 2R	WIG; 3R	LEI; 2R	LEI; 1R	LEI; 3R	LEI; 3R	WIG; 4R	WIG; SF	MIL; 2R	MIL; 2R	HIL; F	HIL; 1R	LEI; 1R	LEI; 3R	LEI; 1R	LEI; W	MIL; SF	MIL; 3R	WIG; 4R	WIG; 1R	LEI; 2R	LEI; F	HIL; DNP		LEI; SF	LEI; QF	ROS; 1R	ROS; 4R	ROS; DNP		LEI; 4R	LEI; 1R

Performance Table Legend
W	Won the tournament	F	Finalist	SF	Semifinalist	QF	Quarterfinalist	#R; RR; Prel.	Lost in # round Round-robin; Preliminary round	DQ	Disqualified
DNQ	Did not qualify	DNP	Did not participate	WD	Withdrew	NH	Tournament not held	#R; RR; Prel.	Lost in # round Round-robin; Preliminary round	NYF	Not yet founded
