= Ritchie Edhouse =

English darts player (born 1983)

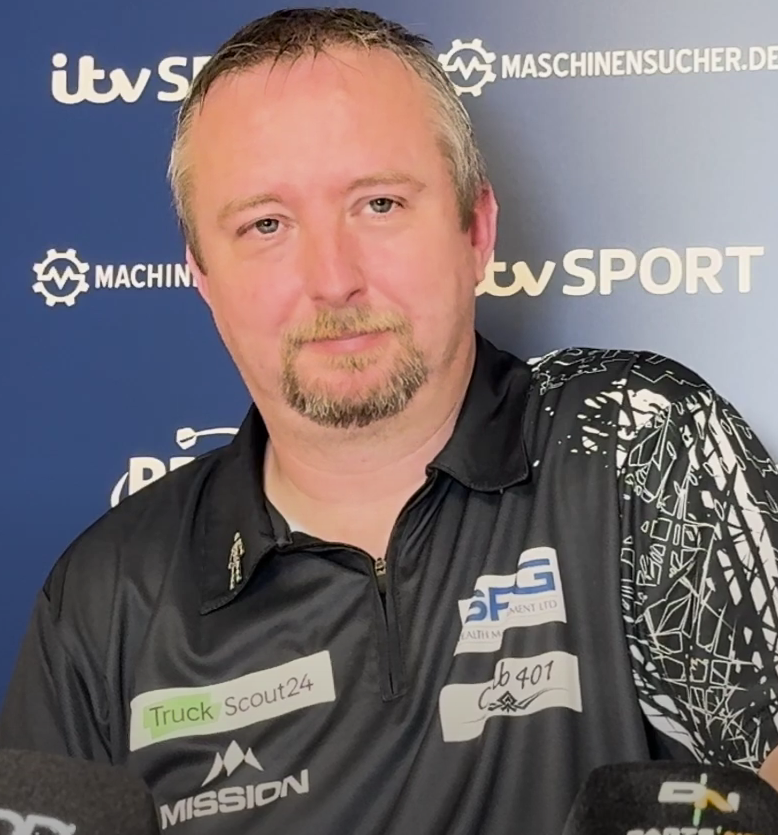
- Edhouse at the 2024 European Championship

Personal information
- Nickname: "Madhouse"
- Born: 19 April 1983 (age 43) Basildon, Essex, England
- Home town: Enfield, London, England

Sport
- Sport: Darts
- Playing since: 2003
- Darts: 23g Mission Signature
- Laterality: Right-handed
- Walk-on music: "Our House" by Madness

Organisation (see split in darts)
- BDO: 2014–2015
- PDC: 2016–present (Tour Card: 2017–2018; 2021–)
- WDF: 2014–2015
- Current world ranking: (PDC) 54 (5 November 2026)

WDF major events – best performances
- World Masters: Last 80: 2014
- World Trophy: Last 32: 2015

PDC premier events – best performances
- World Championship: Last 64: 2020, 2022, 2025
- World Matchplay: Last 32: 2024
- World Grand Prix: Last 32: 2024
- UK Open: Last 64: 2022, 2025
- Grand Slam: Last 16: 2024
- European Championship: Winner (1): 2024
- PC Finals: Last 32: 2021, 2022, 2024

Other tournament wins
- Years
PDC Challenge Tour (×3)	2016, 2019, 2020

Ritchie Edhouse (born 19 April 1983) is an English professional darts player who competes in Professional Darts Corporation (PDC) events. He won his first major title at the 2024 European Championship, defeating Jermaine Wattimena 11–3 in the final. He has made the semi-finals in five ranking events on the PDC Pro Tour, including the 2018 Dutch Darts Championship. Edhouse also won three titles on the PDC Challenge Tour.

== Career ==
=== 2016–2023 ===
Edhouse won his first PDC Challenge Tour title in 2016, whitewashing Mark Dudbridge 5–0 in the final of event three.

Edhouse first won his PDC Tour Card at 2017 Q-School after defeating Mickey Mansell 5–3 on Day Two. He reached the semi-finals of the 2018 Dutch Darts Championship, where he lost to Ricky Evans 7–5. Edhouse hit the maximum check-out of 170, in his 6–4 win in the quarter-finals against the late Kyle Anderson. He won his second Challenge Tour event in early 2019, and a third in 2020, allowing him to regain his tour card for the 2021 season.

He won the opening match of the 2022 PDC World Darts Championship in a 3–2 victory over Peter Hudson, setting up a clash with reigning world champion Gerwyn Price later in the night. Edhouse won the first set but he went on to lose 3–1.

Edhouse suffered first round defeats at the 2023 PDC World Darts Championship and 2024 PDC World Darts Championship, losing to David Cameron and Jeffrey de Graaf.

=== 2024: European Champion ===
Edhouse experienced an improvement of form in 2024, particularly on the European Tour. Edhouse reached the quarter-finals of the 2024 International Darts Open, defeating Jitse Van der Wal 6–1, Michael Smith 6–5 in a deciding leg and Rob Cross 6–4 before losing to Stephen Bunting 6–5 in a deciding leg. He also made the quarter-finals of the 2024 Baltic Sea Darts Open, where he lost to eventual champion Rob Cross 6–5. His success during the year saw him qualify for the 2024 World Matchplay, 2024 World Grand Prix and the 2024 European Championship.

Edhouse headed into the 2024 European Championship as a 250/1 outsider to win the tournament. He won his opening game 6–1 against Gian van Veen, averaging 109.48 in the process. He then defeated former world champions Michael Smith and Gary Anderson before a semi-final victory over Luke Woodhouse. Edhouse reached the final, where he defeated Jermaine Wattimena 11–3 to win his first major title. The win resulted in Edhouse entering the top 32 in the PDC Order of Merit for the first time. It also granted him a spot at the 2024 Grand Slam of Darts, where he lost to Rob Cross in the Last 16.

=== 2025–present ===
At the 2025 PDC World Darts Championship, Edhouse was seeded and started the tournament in the second round for the first time. He lost 3–1 to Ian White. Edhouse missed out on qualification for the 2025 European Championship following a third-round defeat at the Swiss Darts Trophy to Raymond van Barneveld that resulted in Edhouse finishing outside of the top 32 on the European Tour Order of Merit, meaning he could not defend his title.

At the 2026 World Championship, 27th seed Edhouse was defeated 3–0 by New Zealand's Jonny Tata in the first round.

== World Championship results ==
=== PDC World Championship ===
- 2020: Second round (lost to James Wade 0–3)
- 2022: Second round (lost to Gerwyn Price 1–3)
- 2023: First round (lost to David Cameron 2–3)
- 2024: First round (lost to Jeffrey de Graaf 2–3)
- 2025: Second round (lost to Ian White 1–3)
- 2026: First round (lost to Jonny Tata 0–3)

== Career finals ==
=== PDC major finals: 1 (1 title) ===
Legend
European Championship (1–0)

Outcome	No.	Year	Championship	Opponent in the final	Score (Note: (l) = score in legs, (s) = score in sets.)
Winner	1.	2024	European Championship	Jermaine Wattimena	11–3 (l)

== Performance timeline ==
=== BDO ===
Tournament	2014
BDO Ranked televised events
World Masters	3R

=== PDC ===
Tournament	2016	2017	2020	2021	2022	2023	2024	2025	2026
PDC Ranked televised events
World Championship	DNQ		2R	DNQ	2R	1R	1R	2R	1R
World Masters	Did not qualify							Prel.	1R
UK Open	2R	1R	DNQ	1R	4R	3R	3R	4R	4R
World Matchplay	Did not qualify						1R	DNQ	
World Grand Prix	Did not qualify						1R	DNQ	
European Championship	Did not qualify			1R	DNQ		W	DNQ	
Grand Slam	Did not qualify				RR	DNQ	2R	DNQ	
Players Championship Finals	Did not qualify			2R	2R	1R	2R	1R	
Career statistics
Year-end ranking	110	99	154	68	46	58	28	27	

==== European Tour ====
Season	1	2	3	4	5	6	7	8	9	10	11	12	13	14	15
2016	DDM; 3R	Did not participate/qualify				EDO; 2R	IDO; DNQ	EDT; 1R	DNQ						
2017	Did not qualify				GDT; 1R	EDM; DNQ	ADO; 1R	Did not qualify							
2018	EDO; 1R	DNQ		ADO; 1R	DNQ		GDT; 1R	DNQ			DDC; SF	DNQ			
2019	EDO; 1R	GDC; DNQ	GDG; 3R	DNQ			DDM; 2R	Did not qualify				IDO; 2R	GDT; 2R		
2021	HDT; DNQ	GDT; 2R													
2022	IDO; 2R	DNQ			EDO; 1R	CDO; 2R	EDG; DNQ	DDC; 2R	Did not qualify				GDT; 2R		
2023	BSD; 2R	Did not qualify							EDG; 1R	Did not qualify					
2024	DNQ		IDO; QF	EDG; 3R	ADO; 3R	BSD; QF	DDC; 3R	EDO; 2R	GDC; 2R	FDT; 2R	HDT; 1R	SDT; 1R	CDO; 2R		
2025	BDO; 3R	EDT; 2R	IDO; 2R	GDG; 1R	ADO; 1R	EDG; 1R	DDC; 3R	EDO; 3R	DNQ		CDO; 1R	HDT; 1R	SDT; 3R	GDC; DNQ	
2026	PDO; 1R	DNQ		GDG; 2R	Did not qualify						HDT; 2R	Did not qualify			

==== Players Championships ====
Season	1	2	3	4	5	6	7	8	9	10	11	12	13	14	15	16	17	18	19	20	21	22	23	24	25	26	27	28	29	30	31	32	33	34
2017	BAR; 1R	BAR; 1R	BAR; QF	BAR; 1R	MIL; 1R	MIL; 2R	BAR; 1R	BAR; 1R	WIG; 4R	WIG; 2R	MIL; 2R	MIL; 1R	WIG; 1R	WIG; 1R	BAR; 1R	BAR; 1R	BAR; 1R	BAR; 3R	DUB; 1R	DUB; 2R	BAR; 2R	BAR; 1R												
2018	BAR; 1R	BAR; 1R	BAR; 4R	BAR; 2R	MIL; 1R	MIL; 1R	BAR; 2R	BAR; 2R	WIG; 1R	WIG; 1R	MIL; 1R	MIL; 1R	WIG; 2R	WIG; 1R	BAR; 1R	BAR; 2R	BAR; 1R	BAR; 3R	DUB; 1R	DUB; 1R	BAR; 1R	BAR; 1R												
2019 (Note: Not a Tour card holder)	WIG; 3R	WIG; 1R	WIG; 1R	WIG; 2R	BAR; 2R	BAR; 4R	WIG; 2R	WIG; 1R	BAR; 1R	BAR; 1R	BAR; 1R	BAR; 1R	BAR; 2R	BAR; 2R	BAR; 3R	BAR; 2R	WIG; 1R	WIG; 2R	BAR; 1R	BAR; 1R	HIL; 2R	HIL; 1R	BAR; 2R	BAR; 2R	BAR; 1R	BAR; 2R	DUB; 2R	DUB; 4R	BAR; 3R	BAR; 1R				
2020	Did not participate																		COV; 2R	COV; 1R	COV; 3R	COV; 2R	COV; 4R											
2021	BOL; 1R	BOL; 3R	BOL; 1R	BOL; 1R	MIL; 1R	MIL; 2R	MIL; 3R	MIL; 2R	NIE; 3R	NIE; 1R	NIE; QF	NIE; 1R	MIL; 1R	MIL; QF	MIL; 2R	MIL; 1R	COV; 4R	COV; 2R	COV; 1R	COV; 2R	BAR; QF	BAR; 1R	BAR; 1R	BAR; 2R	BAR; 2R	BAR; 2R	BAR; 2R	BAR; 2R	BAR; 2R	BAR; 2R				
2022	BAR; 4R	BAR; 2R	WIG; 1R	WIG; 1R	BAR; 1R	BAR; 2R	NIE; 3R	NIE; 3R	BAR; 1R	BAR; 1R	BAR; 1R	BAR; 3R	BAR; 2R	WIG; QF	WIG; 3R	NIE; 3R	NIE; 3R	BAR; 2R	BAR; 1R	BAR; 1R	BAR; 3R	BAR; 1R	BAR; 1R	BAR; 3R	BAR; 1R	BAR; 1R	BAR; 1R	BAR; 1R	BAR; 3R	BAR; 2R				
2023	BAR; 2R	BAR; 1R	BAR; 1R	BAR; 1R	BAR; 1R	BAR; 2R	HIL; 1R	HIL; 1R	WIG; 2R	WIG; 2R	LEI; 1R	LEI; 2R	HIL; 1R	HIL; 2R	LEI; 3R	LEI; 2R	HIL; SF	HIL; 1R	BAR; 2R	BAR; 2R	BAR; 4R	BAR; 1R	BAR; 2R	BAR; 2R	BAR; 1R	BAR; SF	BAR; 1R	BAR; 1R	BAR; 4R	BAR; 2R				
2024	WIG; 1R	WIG; 1R	LEI; 4R	LEI; 2R	HIL; 1R	HIL; 3R	LEI; 4R	LEI; 3R	HIL; SF	HIL; 3R	HIL; 4R	HIL; 1R	MIL; 1R	MIL; 2R	MIL; 3R	MIL; 3R	MIL; 2R	MIL; 3R	MIL; 2R	WIG; 2R	WIG; SF	MIL; 3R	MIL; 2R	WIG; 2R	WIG; 2R	WIG; 4R	WIG; 1R	WIG; 2R	LEI; 1R	LEI; 3R				
2025	WIG; 3R	WIG; 2R	ROS; 1R	ROS; 1R	LEI; 2R	LEI; 2R	HIL; 1R	HIL; 3R	LEI; 3R	LEI; 3R	LEI; 4R	LEI; QF	ROS; 2R	ROS; 1R	HIL; 1R	HIL; 1R	LEI; 1R	LEI; 3R	LEI; DNP	LEI; 1R	LEI; 1R	HIL; 1R	HIL; 1R	MIL; 2R	MIL; 3R	HIL; 2R	HIL; 1R	LEI; 1R	LEI; 1R	LEI; 2R	WIG; 2R	WIG; 4R	WIG; 2R	WIG; 3R
2026	HIL; 1R	HIL; 4R	WIG; 4R	WIG; 3R	LEI; 1R	LEI; 2R	LEI; 2R	LEI; 1R	WIG; 1R	WIG; 1R	MIL; 1R	MIL; 1R	HIL; 4R	HIL; 2R	LEI; QF	LEI; 1R	LEI; 1R	LEI; 2R	MIL; 2R	MIL; 1R	WIG; 1R	WIG; 2R	LEI; 1R	LEI; 1R	HIL; 1R	HIL; QF	LEI; 2R	LEI; 1R	ROS; 2R	ROS; 2R	ROS; 2R	ROS; 3R	LEI; 1R	LEI; 1R

Performance Table Legend
W	Won the tournament	F	Finalist	SF	Semifinalist	QF	Quarterfinalist	#R; RR; Prel.	Lost in # round Round-robin; Preliminary round	DQ	Disqualified
DNQ	Did not qualify	DNP	Did not participate	WD	Withdrew	NH	Tournament not held	#R; RR; Prel.	Lost in # round Round-robin; Preliminary round	NYF	Not yet founded
