= 2020 PDC Pro Tour =

Darts tournament

Final 2020 PDC Pro Tour Order of Merit.
Rank	Player	Earnings
1	Gerwyn Price	£96,750
2	Peter Wright	£86,750
3	Michael van Gerwen	£85,250
4	Joe Cullen	£67,000
5	José de Sousa	£63,500
6	Nathan Aspinall	£62,500
7	Michael Smith	£59,000
8	Krzysztof Ratajski	£58,250
9	James Wade	£56,750
10	Devon Petersen	£50,000
11	Ian White	£46,750
12	Danny Noppert	£43,750
13	Mensur Suljović	£43,250
14	Glen Durrant	£31,750
15	Rob Cross	£31,250
16	Brendan Dolan	£30,250
17	Damon Heta	£29,750
18	Dave Chisnall	£29,500
19	Daryl Gurney	£28,000
20	Ryan Searle	£26,750
20	Gabriel Clemens	£26,750
22	Jonny Clayton	£26,500
23	Mervyn King	£25,500
24	Dirk van Duijvenbode	£25,000
24	Stephen Bunting	£25,000
26	Jermaine Wattimena	£24,750
27	Jamie Hughes	£24,500
28	Vincent van der Voort	£22,750
29	Ross Smith	£22,250
30	Madars Razma	£21,000
31	Ryan Joyce	£20,750
31	Martijn Kleermaker	£20,750

The 2020 PDC Pro Tour was a series of non-televised darts tournaments organised by the Professional Darts Corporation (PDC). Players Championships and European Tour events are the events that make up the Pro Tour. There were 27 PDC Pro Tour events held, 23 Players Championships and 4 European Tour events.

This page also includes results from the PDC's affiliated tours including the Development and Challenge Tours and all the regional tours as well as the results from the World Championship regional qualifiers. There were 10 Challenge Tour events, 10 Development Tour events, 2 PDC Nordic and Baltic Events, 6 Dartplayers Australia Pro Tour events, 3 EuroAsian Darts Corporation Pro Tour Events and 8 Championship Darts Circuit Pro Tour events during the 2020 season.

All tours were disrupted, and in the case of the PDC Asian Tour cancelled, as a result of the COVID-19 pandemic.

== Prize money ==
The prize money for the Players Championship and European Tour events was unchanged from the 2019 levels.

This is how the prize money is divided:

Stage	ET	PC	CT/DT	WS
Winner	£25,000	£10,000	£2,000	£1,000
Runner-up	£10,000	£6,000	£1,000	£600
Semi-finalists	£6,500	£3,000	£500	£400
Quarter-finalists	£5,000	£2,250	£300	£250
Last 16	£3,000	£1,500	£200	£100
Last 32	£2,000	£1,000	£100	£50
Last 48	£1,000	N/A	N/A	N/A
Last 64	N/A	£500	£50	N/A
Total	£140,000	£75,000	£10,000	£5,000

== PDC Tour Card ==
128 players are granted Tour Cards, which enables them to participate in all Players Championships events, the UK Open and all the European Tour events.

=== Tour cards ===
The 2020 Tour Cards are awarded to:

- (64) The top 64 players from the PDC Order of Merit after the 2020 World Championship.
  - Raymond van Barneveld resigned his card, and therefore, Toni Alcinas moved into the top 64.
  - Corey Cadby resigned his card, and therefore, Simon Stevenson moved into the top 64.
- (25) 25 qualifiers from 2019 Q-School not ranked in the top 64 of the PDC Order of Merit following the World Championship.
  - Jamie Bain resigned his Tour Card.
- (2) Two highest qualifiers from 2018 Challenge Tour (Michael Barnard and Ted Evetts).
- (2) Two highest qualifiers from 2018 Development Tour (Geert Nentjes and Rowby-John Rodriguez).
- (2) Two highest qualifiers from 2019 Challenge Tour (Callan Rydz and Jesús Noguera).
- (2) The highest qualifiers from 2019 Development Tour (Ryan Meikle and Ciarán Teehan).
- (12) The 12 qualifiers from the 2020 Qualifying Schools.

Afterwards, the playing field will be complemented by the highest qualified players from the Q School Order of Merit until the maximum number of 128 Pro Tour Card players had been reached. In 2020, that means that a total of 19 players will qualify this way.

=== Q-School ===
The PDC Pro Tour Qualifying School (or Q-School) was split into a UK and European Q-School. Players that are not from Europe could choose which Q-School they wanted to compete in.

- The UK Q-School took place at the Robin Park Arena in Wigan from 16 to 19 January.
- The European Q-School took place at Halle 39 in Hildesheim from 16 to 19 January.

The following players won two-year tour cards on each of the days played:

UK Q-School
January 16	January 17	January 18	January 19
Jason Lowe; Gary Blades	Kai Fan Leung; Bradley Brooks	Jeff Smith; Aaron Beeney	Nick Kenny; Scott Waites
506 players	503 players	461 players	469 players
European Q-School
January 16	January 17	January 18	January 19
Harald Leitinger	Mike De Decker	Karel Sedláček	Steffen Siepmann
313 players	314 players	271 players	280 players

An Order of Merit was also created for each Q School. For every win after the first full round (without byes) the players were awarded 1 point.

To complete the field of 128 Tour Card Holders, places were allocated down the final Qualifying School Order of Merits in proportion to the number of entrants. The following players picked up Tour Cards as a result:

UK Q-School Order of Merit

1. Adam Hunt
2. Ryan Murray
3. Peter Jacques
4. Damon Heta
5. Andy Hamilton
6. Alan Tabern
7. Wayne Jones
8. William Borland
9. Martin Atkins
10. Steve Brown
11. Darren Penhall
12. Lisa Ashton

European Q-School Order of Merit

1. Dirk van Duijvenbode
2. Wesley Harms
3. Derk Telnekes
4. Martijn Kleermaker
5. Daniel Larsson
6. Boris Krčmar
7. Krzysztof Kciuk

== Players Championships ==
The Players Championship events was scheduled to be 30 events as normal, but due to the COVID-19 pandemic, a significant number of events were postponed, including all from mid-March to the end of June. The PDC scheduled five events from July 8 at the Marshall Arena, Milton Keynes, to make up. These events were branded the "PDC Summer Series". Following this a "PDC Autumn Series" was arranged in Niedernhausen, Germany, with a "PDC Winter Series" following in Coventry.

No.	Date	Venue	Winner	Legs	Runner-up	Ref.
1	Saturday 8 February	Barnsley Metrodome, (England) Barnsley	Gary Anderson (97.97)	8 – 4	Jeff Smith (93.78)	
2	Sunday 9 February	Barnsley Metrodome, (England) Barnsley	Nathan Aspinall (101.25)	8 – 3	Gerwyn Price (97.26)	
3	Saturday 15 February	Robin Park Tennis Centre, (England) Wigan	Ryan Searle (97.07)	8 – 6	Michael van Gerwen (99.61)	
4	Sunday 16 February	Robin Park Tennis Centre, (England) Wigan	Krzysztof Ratajski (98.41)	8 – 7	Ian White (99.61)	
5	Saturday 22 February	Robin Park Tennis Centre, (England) Wigan	Peter Wright (109.59)	8 – 6	Gerwyn Price (109.19)	
6	Sunday 23 February	Robin Park Tennis Centre, (England) Wigan	Gerwyn Price (102.54)	8 – 7	Michael van Gerwen (101.93)	
7	Saturday 14 March	Barnsley Metrodome, (England) Barnsley	Nathan Aspinall (98.20)	8 – 4	Brendan Dolan (93.69)	
8	Sunday 15 March	Barnsley Metrodome, (England) Barnsley	Ian White (102.06)	8 – 3	James Wade (88.28)	
9	Wednesday 8 July	Arena MK, (England) Milton Keynes (Note: These events were branded the PDC Summer Series, with the top player over the series qualifying for the 2020 Grand Slam of Darts.)	Michael van Gerwen (104.53)	8 – 7	Peter Wright (100.53)	
10	Thursday 9 July	Arena MK, (England) Milton Keynes	Ryan Joyce (100.16)	8 – 7	Dave Chisnall (94.65)	
11	Friday 10 July	Arena MK, (England) Milton Keynes	Michael van Gerwen (102.50)	8 – 3	José de Sousa (97.77)	
12	Saturday 11 July	Arena MK, (England) Milton Keynes	James Wade (95.82)	8 – 2	Rob Cross (95.71)	
13	Sunday 12 July	Arena MK, (England) Milton Keynes	Peter Wright (99.30)	8 – 2	Gerwyn Price (91.82)	
14	Saturday 12 September	H+ Hotel, (Germany) Niedernhausen (Note: These events were branded the PDC Autumn Series, with the top player over the series qualifying for the 2020 Grand Slam of Darts.)	Peter Wright (91.82)	8 – 1	Madars Razma (84.78)	
15	Sunday 13 September	H+ Hotel, (Germany) Niedernhausen	Damon Heta (96.43)	8 – 4	Joe Cullen (94.49)	
16	Monday 14 September	H+ Hotel, (Germany) Niedernhausen	Michael van Gerwen (98.93)	8 – 1	Mensur Suljović (81.98)	
17	Tuesday 15 September	H+ Hotel, (Germany) Niedernhausen	Gerwyn Price (92.29)	8 – 7	Devon Petersen (98.38)	
18	Wednesday 16 September	H+ Hotel, (Germany) Niedernhausen	Gerwyn Price (98.66)	8 – 5	Krzysztof Ratajski (99.05)	
19	Tuesday 10 November	Coventry Arena, (England) Coventry (Note: These events were branded the PDC Winter Series, with the top player over the series qualifying for the 2020 Grand Slam of Darts.)	Michael Smith (92.99)	8 – 6	Jermaine Wattimena (88.50)	
20	Wednesday 11 November	Coventry Arena, (England) Coventry	Michael Smith (96.67)	8 – 7	José de Sousa (100.00)	
21	Thursday 12 November	Coventry Arena, (England) Coventry	Gerwyn Price (95.55)	8 – 6	Damon Heta (94.26)	
22	Friday 13 November	Coventry Arena, (England) Coventry	Peter Wright (98.14)	8 – 7	José de Sousa (100.49)	
23	Saturday 14 November	Coventry Arena, (England) Coventry	Joe Cullen (105.09)	8 – 4	Krzysztof Ratajski (94.28)	

== European Tour ==
The European Tour was announced at 13 events, including events in Belgium and Hungary for the first time. Due to the COVID-19, only 4 events took place with the others having been cancelled.

No.	Date	Event	Location	Winner	Legs	Runner-up	Ref.
1	28 February–1 March	Belgian Darts Championship	(Belgium) Hasselt, Expo Hasselt	Gerwyn Price (100.03)	8 – 3	Michael Smith (96.26)	
2	25–27 September	German Darts Championship	(Germany) Hildesheim, Halle 39	Devon Petersen (102.75)	8 – 3	Jonny Clayton (91.43)	
3	16–18 October	European Darts Grand Prix	(Germany) Sindelfingen, Glaspalast	José de Sousa (105.79)	8 – 4	Michael van Gerwen (92.43)	
4	23–25 October	International Darts Open	(Germany) Riesa, SACHSENarena	Joe Cullen (97.19)	8 – 5	Michael van Gerwen (91.37)	

== PDC Challenge Tour ==
Final Challenge Tour ranking
Rank	Player	Earnings
1.	David Evans	£4,400
2.	Ritchie Edhouse	£3,450
3.	Keane Barry	£3,350
4.	Matthew Dennant	£3,300
5.	Scott Mitchell	£3,150
6.	Jim Williams	£2,450
6.	Rob Collins	£2,450
8.	Maikel Verberk	£2,400
9.	Kevin Doets	£2,300
10.	Jitse van der Wal	£2,150

The Challenge Tour was planned to increase from 20 to 24 events for 2020, but due to the COVID-19 pandemic in the United Kingdom was only ten events.

The top two players win a Two-Year PDC Tour Card for 2021–20, with the players finishing from third to eighth earning free entry to the 2021 PDC Q-School. The Order of Merit leader is also invited to compete in the 2020/21 World Darts Championship.

David Evans topped the rankings and qualified for the World Championship and was awarded a Tour Card for the next two years, while Ritchie Edhouse took second and also earned a Tour Card.

The top eight unqualified players will also qualify for the 2021 UK Open.

No.	Date	Venue	Winner	Legs	Runner-up	Ref.
1	Saturday 25 January	Robin Park Tennis Centre, (England) Wigan	Rob Collins (89.10)	5 – 4	Adam Huckvale (89.21)	
2	Saturday 25 January	Robin Park Tennis Centre, (England) Wigan	Scott Mitchell (99.41)	5 – 1	Andrew Gilding (91.69)	
3	Sunday 26 January	Robin Park Tennis Centre, (England) Wigan	Matthew Dennant (91.96)	5 – 4	Nathan Rafferty (86.18)	
4	Sunday 26 January	Robin Park Tennis Centre, (England) Wigan	Jitse van der Wal (89.27)	5 – 2	Arjan Konterman (87.76)	
5	Friday 9 October	Barnsley Metrodome, (England) Barnsley	Keane Barry (91.33)	5 – 4	Maikel Verberk (85.68)	
6	Friday 9 October	Barnsley Metrodome, (England) Barnsley	David Evans (92.34)	5 – 4	Richie Burnett (94.07)	
7	Saturday 10 October	Barnsley Metrodome, (England) Barnsley	Jim Williams (100.50)	5 – 2	Lewy Williams (96.74)	
8	Saturday 10 October	Barnsley Metrodome, (England) Barnsley	David Evans (93.94)	5 – 0	Chas Barstow (85.75)	
9	Sunday 11 October	Barnsley Metrodome, (England) Barnsley	Ritchie Edhouse (97.83)	5 – 4	Scott Taylor (83.10)	
10	Sunday 11 October	Barnsley Metrodome, (England) Barnsley	Kevin Doets (96.64)	5 – 3	Ritchie Edhouse (95.92)	

== PDC Development Tour ==
Final Development Tour ranking
Rank	Player	Earnings
1.	Ryan Meikle	£7,000
2.	Keane Barry	£6,000
3.	Berry van Peer	£4,250
4.	Damian Mol	£3,750
5.	Ted Evetts	£3,450
6.	Kevin Doets	£2,950
7.	Martin Schindler	£2,400
8.	Callan Rydz	£2,350
9.	Wessel Nijman	£2,250
10.	Niels Zonneveld	£2,200

The Development Tour was planned with 20 events for 2020, but due to the COVID-19 pandemic in the United Kingdom there were only ten events.

The top two players earned a PDC Tour Card for 2021/2022, with the players from third to eighth receiving free entry to the 2021 PDC Q-School (if they do not already possess a Tour Card). The top two players also earned a place in the 2021 PDC World Darts Championship.

Ryan Meikle topped the Development Tour Order of Merit, with Keane Barry finishing second, both gaining their place at the 2021 World Championship. As Meikle is already a Tour Card holder, the second automatic tour card goes to the third ranked Berry van Peer, with Barry being the other Tour Card winner.

The top eight unqualified players also qualified for the 2021 UK Open.

No.	Date	Venue	Winner	Legs	Runner-up	Ref.
1	Saturday 29 February	Halle 39, (Germany) Hildesheim	Berry van Peer (91.47)	5 – 1	Martin Schindler (85.75)	
2	Saturday 29 February	Halle 39, (Germany) Hildesheim	Ryan Meikle (83.88)	5 – 3	Niels Zonneveld (86.53)	
3	Sunday 1 March	Halle 39, (Germany) Hildesheim	Ryan Meikle (91.29)	5 – 3	Nico Kurz (87.72)	
4	Sunday 1 March	Halle 39, (Germany) Hildesheim	Wessel Nijman (90.28)	5 – 3	Martin Schindler (88.84)	
5	Friday 25 September	Barnsley Metrodome, (England) Barnsley	Kevin Doets (92.05)	5 – 4	Keane Barry (93.99)	
6	Friday 25 September	Barnsley Metrodome, (England) Barnsley	Damian Mol (80.78)	5 – 3	Keelan Kay (76.89)	
7	Saturday 26 September	Barnsley Metrodome, (England) Barnsley	Ted Evetts (90.00)	5 – 3	Joe Davis (93.66)	
8	Saturday 26 September	Barnsley Metrodome, (England) Barnsley	Keane Barry (89.31)	5 – 3	Ryan Meikle (83.70)	
9	Sunday 27 September	Barnsley Metrodome, (England) Barnsley	Keane Barry (101.74)	5 – 4	Ryan Meikle (104.71)	
10	Sunday 27 September	Barnsley Metrodome, (England) Barnsley	Callan Rydz (104.28)	5 – 1	Lok Yin Lee (90.04)	

== PDC Women's Series ==
Final Women's Series ranking
Rank	Player	Earnings
1.	Lisa Ashton	£2,450
2.	Deta Hedman	£2,250
2.	Fallon Sherrock	£2,250
4.	Corrine Hammond	£1,350
5.	Aileen de Graaf	£1,000
6.	Lorraine Winstanley	£800
7.	Vicky Pruim	£650
8.	Felicia Blay	£550
8.	Jo Locke	£550
8.	Tracy North	£550

The PDC Women's Series was introduced to replace the separate World Championship qualifiers that had been held the last two years. The top two players both qualified for the World Championship.

Tour Card holder Lisa Ashton topped the weekend table with two event victories to qualify for the 2021 PDC World Darts Championship. Though Deta Hedman and Fallon Sherrock tied the weekend on earnings, Hedman was granted the second spot on the tiebreaker with 85 legs won over the series to Sherrock's 83 legs won.

No.	Date	Venue	Winner	Legs	Runner-up	Ref.
1	Saturday 17 October	Barnsley Metrodome, (England) Barnsley	Lisa Ashton (94.70)	6 – 3	Fallon Sherrock (89.16)	
2	Saturday 17 October	Barnsley Metrodome, (England) Barnsley	Deta Hedman (83.31)	6 – 5	Aileen de Graaf (75.21)	
3	Sunday 18 October	Barnsley Metrodome, (England) Barnsley	Lisa Ashton (83.39)	6 – 3	Deta Hedman (76.78)	
4	Sunday 18 October	Barnsley Metrodome, (England) Barnsley	Fallon Sherrock (87.94)	6 – 2	Corrine Hammond (83.11)	

== Professional Darts Corporation Nordic & Baltic (PDCNB) ==
The Professional Darts Corporation Nordic & Baltic Tour had 10 events scheduled. Due to the COVID-19 pandemic, planned events in Copenhagen and Gothenburg were postponed. A planned season restart in Riga was also cancelled, and the season was settled based on the first two events.

No.	Date	Venue	Winner	Legs	Runner-up	Ref.
1	Saturday 29 February	Hotelli Tallukka, (Finland) Vääksy	Kim Viljanen (89.77)	6 – 5	Darius Labanauskas (89.31)	
2	Sunday 1 March	Hotelli Tallukka, (Finland) Vääksy	Daniel Larsson (89.24)	6 – 2	Kim Viljanen (82.44)	

== Professional Darts Corporation Asian Tour ==
The Professional Darts Corporation Asian Tour was scaled down to 10 events, taking place from August to November. The postponements were due to the COVID-19 pandemic. On 11 August 2020, the Tour was cancelled.

== Dartplayers Australia (DPA) Pro Tour ==
The DPA Tour was suspended after the sixth event and was not restarted in 2020. Gordon Mathers, who was top of the DPA rankings at the time of the suspension, took the place at the 2021 PDC World Darts Championship.

No.	Date	Venue	Winner	Score	Runner-up	Ref.
1	Friday 31 January	Warilla Bowls and Recreation Club (Australia) Barrack Heights	(88.02) Gordon Mathers	6 – 3 (l)	Kyle Anderson (88.70)	
2	Saturday 1 February	Warilla Bowls and Recreation Club (Australia) Barrack Heights	(87.18) Robbie King	5 – 3 (l)	Jamie Rundle (81.18)	
3	Sunday 2 February	Warilla Bowls and Recreation Club (Australia) Barrack Heights	(91.50) Kyle Anderson	2 – 0 (s)	Mal Cuming (87.91)	
4	Friday 6 March	Pine Rivers Darts Club (Australia) Brisbane	(78.94) Mal Cuming	6 – 1 (l)	Jamie Rundle (76.45)	
5	Saturday 7 March	Pine Rivers Darts Club (Australia) Brisbane	(85.45) Ben Robb	5 – 2 (l)	Haupai Puha (82.34)	
6	Sunday 8 March	Pine Rivers Darts Club (Australia) Brisbane	(87.12) Steve Fitzpatrick	2 – 0 (s)	Gordon Mathers (85.79)	

== EuroAsian Darts Corporation (EADC) Pro Tour ==
Originally six events were due to take place on the EADC Tour, but owing to the COVID-19 pandemic, only the first three took place.

No.	Date	Venue	Winner	Legs	Runner-up	Ref.
1	Saturday 22 February	Omega Plaza Business Center, (Russia) Moscow	Boris Koltsov	6 – 4	Aleksei Kadochnikov	
2	Saturday 22 February	Omega Plaza Business Center, (Russia) Moscow	Aleksei Kadochnikov	6 – 2	Boris Koltsov	
3	Sunday 23 February	Omega Plaza Business Center, (Russia) Moscow	Boris Koltsov	6 – 2	Evgenii Izotov	

== Championship Darts Corporation (CDC) Pro Tour ==
The Championship Darts Corporation hosted a tour of 8 events held over 2 weekends, one in the United States and one in Canada. Players are only able to enter the events held in their own country and the top player from each group of 4 events will qualify for the 2021 PDC World Darts Championship. There were originally due to be more events, but the schedule was heavily disrupted by the COVID-19 pandemic.

Matt Campbell and Danny Baggish topped the Canadian and USA Series Order of Merits respectively and qualified for the World Championship.

=== Canadian Tour ===
No.	Date	Venue	Winner	Legs	Runner-up	Ref.
1	Saturday 26 September	(Canada) Woodstock, Ontario	Shawn Burt (94.22)	6 – 3	David Cameron (89.48)	
2	Saturday 26 September	(Canada) Woodstock, Ontario	David Cameron (89.14)	6 – 5	Matt Campbell (87.30)	
3	Saturday 27 September	(Canada) Woodstock, Ontario	Matt Campbell (93.19)	6 – 3	Shawn Burt (86.48)	
4	Saturday 27 September	(Canada) Woodstock, Ontario	Jim Long (78.79)	6 – 3	Matt Campbell (80.39)	

=== USA Tour ===
No.	Date	Venue	Winner	Legs	Runner-up	Ref.
1	Saturday 3 October	(United States) Indianapolis	Danny Baggish (92.29)	6 – 5	Chuck Puleo (93.60)	
2	Saturday 3 October	(United States) Indianapolis	Danny Baggish (92.68)	6 – 5	Danny Lauby (89.49)	
3	Sunday 4 October	(United States) Indianapolis	Darin Young (82.05)	6 – 5	Chuck Puleo (85.94)	
4	Sunday 4 October	(United States) Indianapolis	Danny Baggish (94.93)	6 – 0	Gary Mawson (75.47)	

== World Championship International Qualifiers ==
Date	Event	Venue	Winner	Score	Runner-up	Ref.
Saturday 19 October 2019	CDC Continental Cup (Note: The North American Championship was scheduled to be held on 6 June 2020 at Hulu Theater in New York City, but was postponed due to the COVID-19 pandemic. Due to the lack of a 2020 tournament, the World Championship place was awarded to the winner of the 2019 CDC Continental Cup.)	(United States) New York City, K of C Council Hall	Danny Lauby (88.48)	8 – 2	Gary Mawson (89.03)	
Sunday 14 June	German Super League	(Germany) Munich	Nico Kurz (94.07)	10 – 9	Dragutin Horvat (94.76)	
Sunday 11 October	PDJ Japanese Championship	(Japan) Kobe, Port Terminal Hall	Edward Foulkes (80.39)	5 – 4	Akihito Morita (81.16)	
Saturday 17 October	PDC China Qualifier	(China) Zhoushan	Chengan Liu (87.82)	6 – 4	Qingyu Zhan (77.24)	
Saturday 17 October	East Europe Qualifier	(Hungary) Vecsés, Bálint Ágnes Cultural Center	Boris Krčmar (94.37)	6 – 1	Patrik Kovács	
Sunday 25 October	EuroAsian Darts Corporation Qualifier	(Russia) Moscow, Omega Plaza Business Center	Dmitriy Gorbunov (75.90)	3 – 1	Roman Obukhov (73.88)	
Sunday 1 November	African Qualifier	(South Africa) Cape Town, Goodwood Sports Club	Cameron Carolissen	7 – 4	Charles Losper	
Sunday 22 November	PDC Asia China Qualifier	(China) Xiamen, Cuesoul Darts Club	Di Zhuang (76.63)	3 – 0	Wenge Xie (70.92)	
Saturday 28 November	PDC Asia Philippines Qualifier	(Philippines) Tacloban	Lourence Ilagan (81.74)	3 – 1	Paolo Nebrida (83.53)	
Sunday 29 November	PDC Asia Japan Qualifier	(Japan) Tokyo, Darts Stadium Ikebukuro	Toru Suzuki (68.74)	5 – 3	Kota Suzuki (65.91)	
Sunday 29 November	PDC Asia Hong Kong Qualifier	(Hong Kong) Kowloon, Regal Oriental Hotel	Paul Lim (89.23)	7 – 5	Lee Lok Yin (87.64)	
Sunday 29 November	World Youth Championship	(England) Coventry, Ricoh Arena	Bradley Brooks (81.63)	6 – 5	Joe Davis (78.16)	
Monday 30 November	UK Tour Card Holders' Qualifier	(England) Coventry, Ricoh Arena	Ciarán Teehan (97.95)	7 – 6	Joe Murnan (90.06)	
Monday 30 November	UK Tour Card Holders' Qualifier	(England) Coventry, Ricoh Arena	Jamie Lewis (83.03)	7 – 5	Robert Thornton (85.99)	
Monday 30 November	UK Tour Card Holders' Qualifier	(England) Coventry, Ricoh Arena	Matthew Edgar (95.93)	7 – 2	Josh Payne (87.43)	
Monday 30 November	UK Tour Card Holders' Qualifier	(England) Coventry, Ricoh Arena	Nick Kenny (86.47)	7 – 6	James Wilson (92.64)	
Monday 30 November	Rest of the World Tour Card Holders' Qualifier	(England) Coventry, Ricoh Arena	Niels Zonneveld (95.02)	7 – 4	Martin Schindler (88.16)	
Monday 30 November	Rest of the World Tour Card Holders' Qualifier	(England) Coventry, Ricoh Arena	Karel Sedláček (94.32)	7 – 2	Jan Dekker (89.65)	
