= 2024 European Championship (darts) =

2024 Machineseeker European Championship

Tournament information
- Dates: 24–27 October 2024
- Venue: Westfalenhallen
- Location: Dortmund, Germany
- Organisation(s): Professional Darts Corporation (PDC)
- Format: Legs
- Prize fund: £600,000
- Winner's share: £120,000
- High checkout: 170 Danny Noppert

Champion(s)
- Ritchie Edhouse

The 2024 European Championship (known for sponsorship reasons as the Machineseeker European Championship), was the seventeenth edition of the Professional Darts Corporation's European Championship tournament, which saw the top players from the thirteen European tour events compete against each other. The tournament took place from 24 to 27 October 2024 at the Westfalenhallen in Dortmund, Germany.

Peter Wright was the defending champion after defeating James Wade 11–6 in the 2023 final. However, he lost to Jermaine Wattimena 6–0 in first round, becoming the sixth consecutive defending European champion to lose in the first round.

The two finalists, Ritchie Edhouse and Wattimena, were the two lowest ranked players in the field coming into the tournament (being the world number 39 and world number 40 respectively). Both were making their maiden televised semi-final and final appearances, with Luke Woodhouse, the third lowest ranked player in the field, at world number 35 also making his first TV semi-final.

Edhouse defeated Wattimena 11–3 to win his first major title. It was also his first PDC title, and with the victory, he entered the top 32 on the PDC Order of Merit for the first time in his career.

== Prize money ==
The 2024 European Championship is expected to have a total prize fund of £600,000.

The following is the breakdown of the fund:

Position (no. of players)		Prize money (Total: £600,000)
Winner	(1)	£120,000
Runner-Up	(1)	£60,000
Semi-finalists	(2)	£40,000
Quarter-finalists	(4)	£25,000
Second round	(8)	£15,000
First round	(16)	£7,500

== Qualification ==
The 2024 tournament continued the now established qualification system whereby the top 32 players from the European Tour Order of Merit qualify for the tournament. The Order of Merit was solely based on prize money won in the thirteen European tour events during the season.

As with the previous tournaments, players were drawn in a fixed bracket by their seeded order with the top qualifier playing the 32nd, the second playing the 31st and so on.

Luke Littler, Luke Woodhouse and Mike De Decker made their debuts in the tournament.

The following players qualified:

1. Martin Schindler (first round)
2. Luke Humphries (quarter-finals)
3. Luke Littler (first round)
4. Dave Chisnall (first round)
5. Michael van Gerwen (second round)
6. Josh Rock (first round)
7. Rob Cross (first round)
8. Ryan Searle (second round)
9. Ross Smith (first round)
10. Peter Wright (first round)
11. Danny Noppert (semi-finals)
12. Stephen Bunting (first round)
13. Gian van Veen (first round)
14. Ricardo Pietreczko (quarter-finals)
15. Chris Dobey (first round)
16. Gerwyn Price (first round)
17. Daryl Gurney (second round)
18. Jonny Clayton (second round)
19. Damon Heta (first round)
20. Ritchie Edhouse (champion)
21. Gary Anderson (quarter-finals)
22. Joe Cullen (first round)
23. Jermaine Wattimena (runner-up)
24. Luke Woodhouse (semi-finals)
25. Raymond van Barneveld (first round)
26. James Wade (second round)
27. Mike De Decker (second round)
28. Gabriel Clemens (first round)
29. Michael Smith (second round)
30. Andrew Gilding (second round)
31. Nathan Aspinall (first round)
32. Dirk van Duijvenbode (quarter-finals)

== Draw ==
First round (best of 11 legs); 24–25 October
1	Martin Schindler 101.78	3
32	Dirk van Duijvenbode 96.59	6
16	Gerwyn Price 96.62	3
17	Daryl Gurney 99.00	6
8	Ryan Searle 101.58	6
25	Raymond van Barneveld 96.62	2
9	Ross Smith 95.17	1
24	Luke Woodhouse 95.26	6
4	Dave Chisnall 85.47	0
29	Michael Smith 92.02	6
13	Gian van Veen 93.47	1
20	Ritchie Edhouse 109.48	6
5	Michael van Gerwen 100.01	6
28	Gabriel Clemens 92.85	1
12	Stephen Bunting 92.16	3
21	Gary Anderson 100.82	6
2	Luke Humphries 106.49	6
31	Nathan Aspinall 98.88	2
15	Chris Dobey 97.74	4
18	Jonny Clayton 94.51	6
7	Rob Cross 95.54	3
26	James Wade 100.71	6
10	Peter Wright 74.81	0
23	Jermaine Wattimena 90.18	6
3	Luke Littler 95.39	4
30	Andrew Gilding 98.92	6
14	Ricardo Pietreczko 100.50	6
19	Damon Heta 91.36	5
6	Josh Rock 88.46	1
27	Mike De Decker 90.14	6
11	Danny Noppert 90.51	6
22	Joe Cullen 80.88	2

Second round (best of 19 legs); 26 October
32	Dirk van Duijvenbode 95.07	10
17	Daryl Gurney 91.17	5
8	Ryan Searle 92.07	8
24	Luke Woodhouse 93.61	10
29	Michael Smith 93.21	9
20	Ritchie Edhouse 95.62	10
5	Michael van Gerwen 93.04	4
21	Gary Anderson 96.91	10
2	Luke Humphries 102.33	10
18	Jonny Clayton 91.62	3
26	James Wade 98.49	9
23	Jermaine Wattimena 100.87	10
30	Andrew Gilding 84.50	3
14	Ricardo Pietreczko 90.24	10
27	Mike De Decker 96.23	6
11	Danny Noppert 100.22	10

Quarter-finals (best of 19 legs); 27 October
32	Dirk van Duijvenbode 88.91	4
24	Luke Woodhouse 92.50	10
20	Ritchie Edhouse 103.91	10
21	Gary Anderson 100.90	5
2	Luke Humphries 96.32	4
23	Jermaine Wattimena 100.40	10
14	Ricardo Pietreczko 99.27	9
11	Danny Noppert 102.41	10

Semi-finals (best of 21 legs); 27 October
24	Luke Woodhouse 93.09	5
20	Ritchie Edhouse 95.03	11
23	Jermaine Wattimena 93.04	11
11	Danny Noppert 90.94	10

Final (best of 21 legs); 27 October
20	Ritchie Edhouse 90.55	11
23	Jermaine Wattimena 84.64	3
