= Mike De Decker =

Belgian darts player (born 1995)

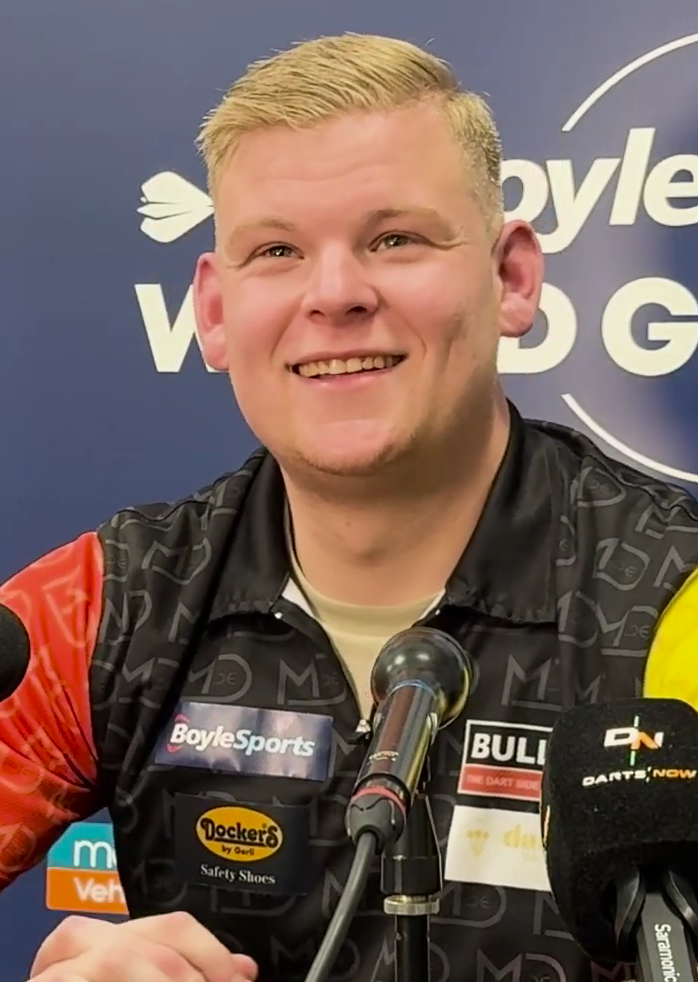
- De Decker at a press conference after his 2024 World Grand Prix win

Personal information
- Nickname: "The Real Deal"
- Born: 15 December 1995 (age 30) Mechelen, Belgium

Sport
- Sport: Darts
- Playing since: 2010
- Darts: 22g Mission Signature
- Laterality: Right-handed
- Walk-on music: "Three Little Birds" by Bob Marley and the Wailers

Organisation (see split in darts)
- BDO: 2013
- PDC: 2014–present (Tour Card: 2016–2017; 2020–present)
- WDF: 2013
- Current world ranking: (PDC) 33 (5 November 2026)

PDC premier events – best performances
- World Championship: Last 64: 2022, 2023, 2024, 2025
- World Matchplay: Last 16: 2025
- World Grand Prix: Winner (1): 2024
- UK Open: Last 32: 2024
- Grand Slam: Last 16: 2024
- European Championship: Last 16: 2024
- PC Finals: Quarter-final: 2024
- Masters: Last 32: 2025
- World Series Finals: Quarter-final: 2025

Other achievements
- 2024 Televised Performance of the Year
Medal record
Men's Darts
Representing Belgium
EDF European Championship
Gold medal – first place	2017 Podčetrtek	Mixed pairs
Gold medal – first place	2022 Podčetrtek	Men's pairs
Silver medal – second place	2019 Podčetrtek	Mixed pairs
Bronze medal – third place	2018 Podčetrtek	Mixed pairs
Bronze medal – third place	2019 Podčetrtek	Men's pairs
Bronze medal – third place	2021 Podčetrtek	Men's singles

Mike De Decker (born 15 December 1995) is a Belgian professional darts player who competes in Professional Darts Corporation (PDC) events. Nicknamed "the Real Deal", he won his first major title at the 2024 World Grand Prix, defeating Luke Humphries 6–4 in the final. He won his first PDC Pro Tour title at Players Championship 16 in 2024. He finished as runner-up at the 2025 Belgian Darts Open on the PDC European Tour, as well as at the 2025 Australian Darts Masters on the World Series of Darts. He reached his second major quarter-final at the 2024 Players Championship Finals. In his youth career, De Decker won four PDC Development Tour titles.

== Career ==
=== 2014–2015: First appearances in the PDC ===
De Decker first played on the PDC Youth Tour in 2014 and reached the Last 16 twice. In the same year, he won the British Teenage Open at the World Darts Federation. He also qualified for three European Tours but failed to win a match.

In January 2015 De Decker played PDC Q-School for the first time but was unable to win a Tour card. He managed to qualify for the 2015 UK Open, through being ranked 81st on the UK Open Qualifiers Order of Merit. He beat Stephen Hardy 5–1 in the first round but was eliminated in the second round 5–3 by Jan Dekker. In the following months De Decker was active on the PDC Challenge Tour and the PDC Development Tour. On the Development Tour, he reached three semi-finals and three finals. He won events 5 and 11, defeating Benito van de Pas 4–3, and Dimitri Van den Bergh 4–2 in the respective finals, but lost to Dean Reynolds 4–2 in the event 15 final. De Decker finished the season ranked second on the Development Tour Order of Merit, which earned him a PDC Tour Card for the 2016 and 2017 seasons. He qualified for the 2015 PDC World Youth Championship as the 4th seed, but lost to Sam Hanson 6–1 in the second round.

In Autumn, De Decker was able to take part in Players Championship events for the first time as a call-up from the Challenge Tour virtue of his ranking on that Order of Merit.

=== 2016–2017: Two years with a Tour card ===
De Decker played on the 2016 PDC Development Tour and won the 19th and final event of the year. In May, he achieved his first victory on the European Tour at the 2016 European Darts Matchplay against Darren Johnson.

After a rather unsuccessful summer, De Decker then reached the last 16 of a Players Championship for the first time at the beginning of October.

In March 2017, De Decker threw a nine-darter on the Development Tour and reached a quarter-final and a semi-final. This was followed by a quarter-final at a Players Championship event in April 2017. He reached the last 16 of the 2017 Dutch Darts Masters on the European Tour for the first time after defeating Richard North and Alan Norris and also qualified for the 2017 Players Championship Finals, where he was eliminated in the first round by Adrian Lewis. After a win on the Development Tour at the end of the year, De Decker again qualified for the 2017 PDC World Youth Championship and this time reached the last 16, where he was eliminated by reigning champion Corey Cadby. De Decker lost his Tour Card at the end of 2017 season.

=== 2018–2019: Two years outside of the Pro Tour ===
De Decker therefore took part in Q-School again in spring 2018, but failed to win a Tour card. On the PDC Challenge Tour and Development Tour, he reached several quarter-finals and once the semi-finals.

At the beginning of 2019, De Decker reached a quarter-final at Q-School, but was again unable to win a Tour card. On the PDC Development Tour, he reached two quarter-finals and a semi-final. De Decker also took part in several European Tour events and reached the last 16 of the 2019 Austrian Darts Championship after defeating Chris Dobey and Jonny Clayton, which he narrowly lost to Rowby-John Rodriguez.

=== 2020–2023: Back on the Pro Tour and settling into the top 64 ===
In January 2020, he won a Tour card at the European Q-School in Hildesheim, beating Dennis Nilsson 5–3 in the Day 2 final. This meant De Decker returned to the Pro Tour for the first time in three years.

De Decker qualified for the 2021 PDC World Darts Championship via the PDC Pro Tour Order of Merit. In his World Championship debut he met fellow debutant Edward Foulkes in the first round, but lost 3–0 in sets. De Decker qualified for the 2021 Grand Slam of Darts in November via the Tour Card Holder qualifier. However, he only won one leg in three group matches against Peter Wright, Gabriel Clemens and Fallon Sherrock.

At the 2022 PDC World Darts Championship De Decker defeated Darius Labanauskas in the first round. In the second round he lost 3–0 to Dave Chisnall.

De Decker qualified for the 2023 PDC World Darts Championship, where defeated Jeff Smith 3–1 in the first round. In the second round he lost 3–0 to Mensur Suljović. De Decker made his debut at the 2023 World Matchplay and 2023 World Grand Prix, losing both in the first round.

=== 2024: World Grand Prix champion ===
De Decker qualified for the 2024 PDC World Darts Championship, winning 3–1 against Dragutin Horvat in the first round, but again lost in the second round, 3–1 to Madars Razma.

De Decker won his maiden PDC senior title by defeating Ricky Evans in the final at Players Championship 16. This win helped him qualify for the World Grand Prix through the ProTour Order of Merit.

In October 2024, De Decker won his first ever PDC major title, defeating Luke Humphries 6–4 to win the 2024 World Grand Prix in only his second appearance in the tournament. De Decker became only the second Belgian to win a major title after Dimitri Van den Bergh.

Throughout the season, De Decker managed to qualify for 11 out of 13 European tours, which qualified him for the 2024 European Championship, where he reached the second round on debut, defeating Josh Rock 6–1 before losing to Danny Noppert 10–6.

By winning the Grand Prix, De Decker qualified for the 2024 Grand Slam of Darts, being drawn in Group E with Michael Smith, Jermaine Wattimena and Mensur Suljovic. De Decker lost his first group match to Wattimena, but defeated Suljović and Smith to finish second in his group. De Decker lost 10–9 to Luke Littler in the second round.

=== 2025: European Tour and World Series finals ===
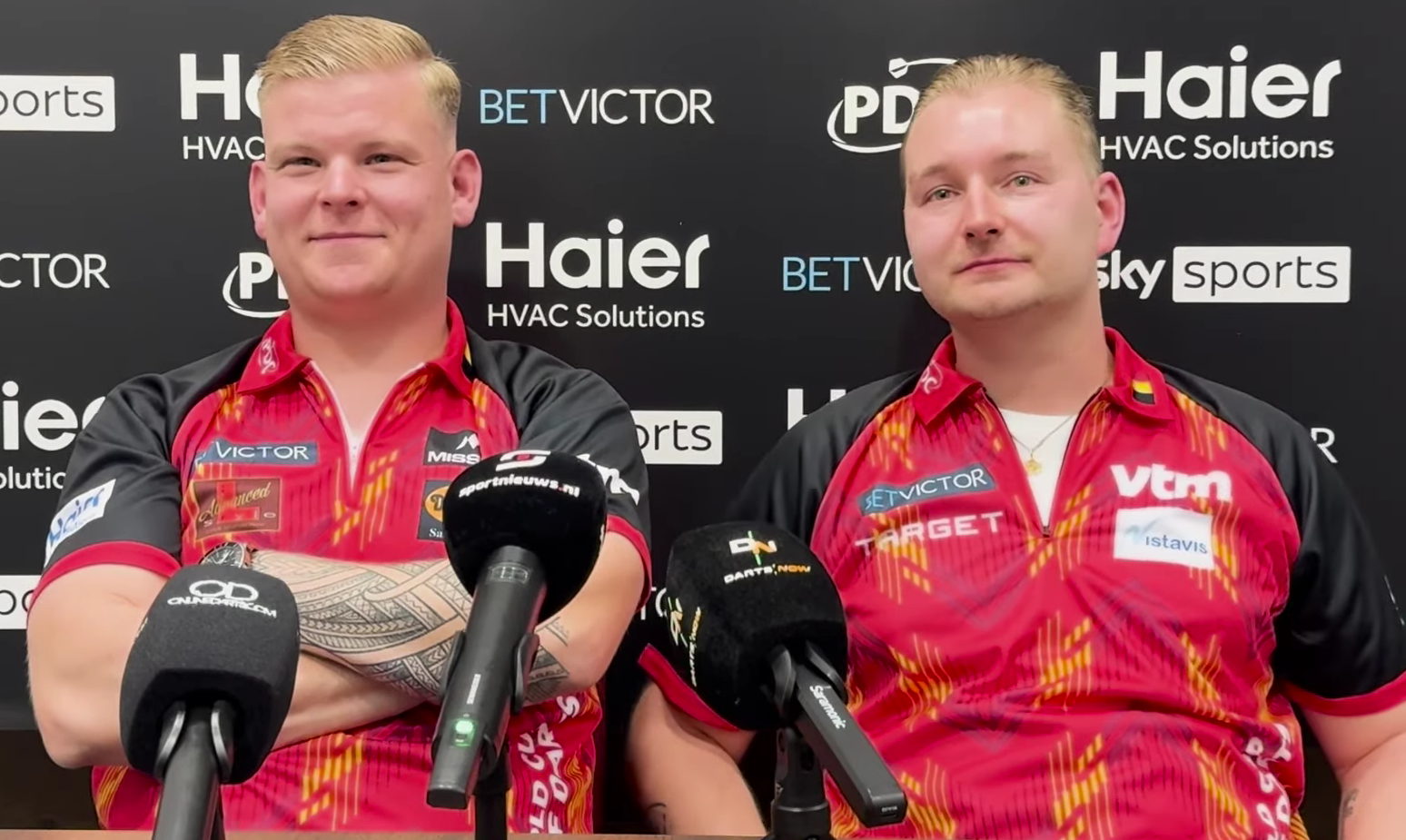
De Decker (left) and his Belgian teammate Dimitri Van den Bergh at the 2025 PDC World Cup of Darts

De Decker lost to Luke Woodhouse 3–1 in the second round of the 2025 PDC World Darts Championship. Following the tournament, De Decker became the first winner of a premier event televised on Sky Sports to not be selected for the Premier League lineup. Speaking on Sky Sports News, PDC chief executive Matt Porter commented that De Decker would not be ready for the Premier League as he had not frequently played in the latter stages of televised tournaments, but described him as an "outstanding talent" and opined that De Decker would likely be in the Premier League in the future. De Decker declined an invite to the 2025 Dutch Darts Masters due to family commitments.

De Decker reached his first European Tour final at the Belgian Darts Open after wins over Luke Humphries, Gerwyn Price and Ross Smith. He was unable to capture the title in front of his home crowd, losing 8–3 to Luke Littler. He made his World Cup of Darts debut, representing Belgium alongside Dimitri Van den Bergh, but the pair were eliminated by the Philippines in the group stage. In July 2025, it was announced that De Decker would make his World Series of Darts debut at the Australian Darts Masters and the New Zealand Darts Masters. The same month, he achieved his first win at the World Matchplay by defeating Dave Chisnall 10–7 in his opening match, before going out in the next round. In his first World Series event, he reached the final of the Australian Masters but succumbed to another defeat against Littler, to whom he lost 8–4.

=== 2026 ===
At the 2026 PDC World Darts Championship, De Decker lost 3–2 in the first round to African qualifier David Munyua in a match which has been described as one of the biggest upsets in the history of the World Darts Championship.

== World Championship results ==
=== PDC World Championship ===
- 2021: First round (lost to Edward Foulkes 0–3)
- 2022: Second round (lost to Dave Chisnall 0–3)
- 2023: Second round (lost to Mensur Suljovic 0–3)
- 2024: Second round (lost to Madars Razma 1–3)
- 2025: Second round (lost to Luke Woodhouse 1–3)
- 2026: First round (lost to David Munyua 2–3)

== Career finals ==
=== PDC major finals: 1 (1 title) ===
Legend
World Grand Prix (1–0)

Outcome	No.	Year	Championship	Opponent in the final	Score (Note: (l) = score in legs, (s) = score in sets.)
Winner	1.	2024	World Grand Prix	Luke Humphries	6–4 (s)

=== PDC World Series finals: 1 ===
Outcome	No.	Year	Championship	Opponent in the final	Score
Runner-up	1.	2025	Australian Masters	Luke Littler	4–8 (l)

== Performance timeline ==
=== PDC ===
Tournament	2015	2016	2017	2018	2019	2020	2021	2022	2023	2024	2025	2026
PDC Ranked televised events
World Championship	Did not qualify						1R	2R	2R	2R	2R	1R
World Masters (Note: A non-ranked event until 2025)	Did not qualify										1R	1R
UK Open	2R	2R	Did not qualify			3R	2R	3R	4R	5R	4R	5R
World Matchplay	Did not qualify								1R	DNQ	2R	DNQ
World Grand Prix	Did not qualify								1R	W	2R	DNQ
European Championship	Did not qualify									2R	1R	DNQ
Grand Slam	Did not qualify						RR	DNQ		2R	DNQ	
Players Championship Finals	DNP	DNQ	1R	DNQ		1R	DNQ	2R	1R	QF	1R	
PDC Non-ranked televised events
World Cup	Did not qualify										RR	2R
World Series Finals	Did not qualify										QF	DNQ
World Youth Championship	2R	2R	3R	2R	2R	Did not participate						
Career statistics
Year-end ranking	120	93	71	137	130	90	59	53	39	24	19	

==== European Tour ====
Season	1	2	3	4	5	6	7	8	9	10	11	12	13	14	15
2014	Did not qualify						EDG; 1R	EDT; DNQ							
2015	Did not qualify				IDO; 1R	EDO; 1R	Did not qualify								
2016	DDM; 1R	DNQ		EDM; 2R	Did not qualify										
2017	Did not qualify				GDT; 1R	EDM; 2R	DNQ		DDM; 3R	Did not qualify					
2018	Did not qualify					DDM; 1R	GDT; 2R	DDO; DNQ	EDM; 1R	Did not qualify					
2019	Did not qualify			GDO; 1R	DNQ		DDM; 1R	DDO; 1R	CDO; DNQ	ADC; 3R	EDM; DNQ	IDO; 1R	GDT; DNQ		
2020	BDC; 2R	Did not qualify													
2021	DNQ														
2022	Did not qualify											BDO; 2R	GDT; DNQ		
2023	DNQ		IDO; 3R	Did not qualify				CDO; 2R	DNQ		GDO; 2R	HDT; QF	GDC; DNQ		
2024	BDO; 3R	GDG; 1R	IDO; 1R	EDG; DNQ	ADO; 1R	BSD; QF	DDC; 1R	EDO; 1R	GDC; DNQ	FDT; 2R	HDT; DNQ	SDT; 2R	CDO; QF		
2025	BDO; F	EDT; 3R	IDO; 2R	GDG; 2R	ADO; 2R	EDG; 2R	DDC; 1R	EDO; 3R	BSD; 2R	FDT; 2R	CDO; 2R	HDT; 3R	SDT; 2R	GDC; 2R	
2026	PDO; 2R	EDT; 2R	BDO; 2R	GDG; 2R	EDG; 2R	ADO; 2R	IDO; 2R	BSD; 2R	SDO; QF	EDO; 2R	Did not qualify				DDC; 1R

==== Players Championships ====
Season	1	2	3	4	5	6	7	8	9	10	11	12	13	14	15	16	17	18	19	20	21	22	23	24	25	26	27	28	29	30	31	32	33	34
2015 (Note: Not a Tour card holder)	Did not participate														BAR; 2R	BAR; 3R	DUB; 1R	DUB; 1R	COV; DNP															
2016	BAR; 2R	BAR; 1R	BAR; 1R	BAR; 3R	BAR; 1R	BAR; 2R	BAR; 1R	COV; 3R	COV; 1R	BAR; 2R	BAR; 1R	BAR; 1R	BAR; 1R	BAR; 2R	BAR; 1R	BAR; 1R	DUB; 2R	DUB; 4R	BAR; 1R	BAR; 2R														
2017	BAR; 3R	BAR; 1R	BAR; 1R	BAR; 3R	MIL; 1R	MIL; 1R	BAR; 3R	BAR; 1R	WIG; QF	WIG; 1R	MIL; 3R	MIL; 1R	WIG; 3R	WIG; 1R	BAR; 3R	BAR; 2R	BAR; 1R	BAR; 2R	DUB; 1R	DUB; 2R	BAR; 3R	BAR; 2R												
2018	Did not participate																																	
2019	Did not participate																					HIL; 3R	Did not participate											
2020	BAR; 1R	BAR; 2R	WIG; 1R	WIG; 2R	WIG; 3R	WIG; 1R	BAR; 2R	BAR; 2R	MIL; 1R	MIL; 1R	MIL; 4R	MIL; 1R	MIL; 4R	NIE; 1R	NIE; 2R	NIE; 2R	NIE; 1R	NIE; 2R	COV; 1R	COV; 3R	COV; 2R	COV; 3R	COV; 1R											
2021	BOL; 1R	BOL; 2R	BOL; 1R	BOL; 1R	MIL; 1R	MIL; 1R	MIL; 1R	MIL; 2R	NIE; 1R	NIE; 3R	NIE; 1R	NIE; 4R	MIL; 2R	MIL; 2R	MIL; 2R	MIL; 1R	COV; 2R	COV; 1R	COV; 1R	COV; 1R	BAR; 3R	BAR; 1R	BAR; 1R	BAR; 4R	BAR; 1R	BAR; 3R	BAR; 1R	BAR; 4R	BAR; 1R	BAR; 2R				
2022	BAR; 1R	BAR; 1R	WIG; 1R	WIG; 2R	BAR; QF	BAR; 1R	NIE; 2R	NIE; 2R	BAR; 3R	BAR; 2R	BAR; 1R	BAR; 3R	BAR; 1R	WIG; 2R	WIG; 3R	NIE; 1R	NIE; QF	BAR; 2R	BAR; 3R	BAR; 1R	BAR; 1R	BAR; 2R	BAR; 2R	BAR; 1R	BAR; QF	BAR; 2R	BAR; 2R	BAR; 1R	BAR; SF	BAR; 4R				
2023	BAR; 1R	BAR; 2R	BAR; 3R	BAR; 2R	BAR; 2R	BAR; SF	HIL; 2R	HIL; 4R	WIG; 4R	WIG; 1R	LEI; F	LEI; 3R	HIL; 3R	HIL; 3R	LEI; 2R	LEI; 3R	HIL; 1R	HIL; 1R	BAR; 1R	BAR; SF	BAR; 2R	BAR; 3R	BAR; 2R	BAR; 2R	BAR; 1R	BAR; 1R	BAR; 1R	BAR; 3R	BAR; 2R	BAR; 1R				
2024	WIG; 4R	WIG; 2R	LEI; 2R	LEI; 1R	HIL; 1R	HIL; 1R	LEI; 2R	LEI; 2R	HIL; 2R	HIL; 2R	HIL; 4R	HIL; 3R	MIL; 1R	MIL; 2R	MIL; QF	MIL; W	MIL; 3R	MIL; 2R	MIL; 1R	WIG; 3R	WIG; 3R	LEI; 4R	LEI; 4R	WIG; 4R	WIG; 4R	WIG; 3R	WIG; 3R	WIG; DNP	LEI; 4R	LEI; 4R				
2025	WIG; 4R	WIG; 3R	ROS; 1R	ROS; 1R	LEI; SF	LEI; 1R	HIL; SF	HIL; 2R	LEI; 2R	LEI; 4R	LEI; DNP		ROS; 4R	ROS; 2R	HIL; QF	HIL; 1R	LEI; 3R	LEI; QF	LEI; 2R	LEI; 2R	LEI; 2R	HIL; 2R	HIL; 1R	MIL; 2R	MIL; 1R	HIL; DNP		LEI; 2R	LEI; 4R	LEI; 4R	WIG; DNP		WIG; 3R	WIG; 2R
2026	HIL; 2R	HIL; 1R	WIG; 1R	WIG; QF	LEI; 3R	LEI; 1R	LEI; 1R	LEI; 1R	WIG; 2R	WIG; 1R	MIL; 2R	MIL; 4R	HIL; 3R	HIL; 1R	LEI; DNP		LEI; 1R	LEI; 1R	MIL; 2R	MIL; 2R	WIG; 2R	WIG; 2R	LEI; 4R	LEI; 1R	HIL; 1R	HIL; 1R	LEI; 1R	LEI; SF	ROS; 1R	ROS; 1R	ROS; QF	ROS; 1R	LEI; 1R	LEI; 1R

==== World Series ====
Tournament	2025
Australian Masters	F
New Zealand Masters	QF

Performance Table Legend
W	Won the tournament	F	Finalist	SF	Semifinalist	QF	Quarterfinalist	#R; RR; Prel.	Lost in # round Round-robin; Preliminary round	DQ	Disqualified
DNQ	Did not qualify	DNP	Did not participate	WD	Withdrew	NH	Tournament not held	#R; RR; Prel.	Lost in # round Round-robin; Preliminary round	NYF	Not yet founded

== Titles ==
=== PDC ===
- Majors (1)
  - 2024 (×1): World Grand Prix
- PDC Pro Tour (1)
  - PDC Players Championships (1):
    - 2024 (×1): 16

==== Youth events ====
- PDC Development Tour (4)
  - 2015 (×2): 5, 11
  - 2016 (×1): 19
  - 2017 (×1): 17

=== WDF ===
- Youth titles (2)
  - 2013 (×2): Antwerp Open, Tops of Ghent
