= Ryan Joyce =

English darts player (born 1985)

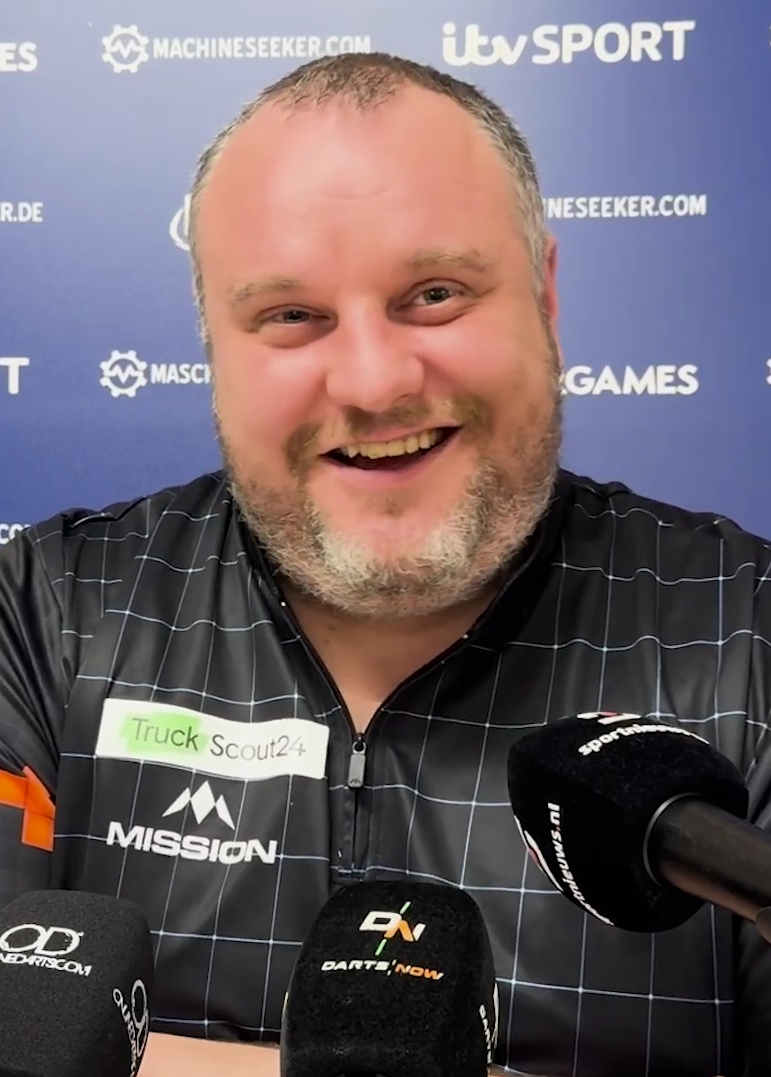
- Joyce at the 2025 European Championship

Personal information
- Nickname: "Relentless"
- Born: 20 September 1985 (age 41) Newcastle, England

Sport
- Sport: Darts
- Playing since: 2007
- Darts: 21g Mission Signature
- Laterality: Right-handed
- Walk-on music: "Tetris" by Doctor Spin

Organisation (see split in darts)
- BDO: 2013–2018
- PDC: 2018–present (Tour Card: 2018–present)
- Current world ranking: (PDC) 25 (5 November 2026)

WDF major events – best performances
- World Championship: Last 32: 2017
- World Masters: Last 48: 2014
- World Trophy: Last 32: 2016

PDC premier events – best performances
- World Championship: Quarter-final: 2019
- World Matchplay: Last 32: 2020, 2024, 2025, 2026
- World Grand Prix: Semi-final: 2024
- UK Open: Last 16: 2025
- Grand Slam: Last 16: 2021, 2024
- European Championship: Quarter-final: 2025
- PC Finals: Semi-final: 2023
- Masters: Last 32: 2026
- World Series Finals: Quarter-final: 2022

Other tournament wins
- Years
BDO Gold Cup	2017
Players Championships (x2)
2020, 2023

Ryan Joyce (born 20 September 1985) is an English professional darts player who competes in Professional Darts Corporation (PDC) events. A professional since 2018, he has won two PDC ranking titles and also reached the quarter-finals of the PDC World Championship in 2019. Nicknamed "Relentless", Joyce has made two PDC major semi-finals, reaching the last four of the 2023 Players Championship Finals and the 2024 World Grand Prix. He has also reached two PDC European Tour finals.

== Career ==
=== BDO ===
In 2014 he reached the Last 48 of the World Masters. He took part in the 2016 BDO World Trophy, he was knocked out in the first round losing to Jamie Hughes. He qualified for the 2017 BDO World Darts Championship, where he won 3–0 against Dennis Nilsson in the Preliminary round. In the first round, he lost to Martin Adams 3–2 in a sudden death leg, after throwing for the match twice and missing one dart at double 18 to win followed by Adams hitting a 115 checkout to stay in the match, before Joyce himself survived a dart at 5–4 down before hitting a 164 checkout to take the game to the deciding leg.

Outside of the major tournaments he has reached 3 BDO ranked event finals, the first was the 2013 Turkish Open where he lost 5–0 to Martin Phillips, then the Isle of Man Open in 2016, losing 6–4 to Tony O'Shea also the Denmark Masters in 2016 losing 6–4 to Glen Durrant. He has had more success in pairs competitions winning the Turkish open pairs 2013, Welsh open pairs 2015 and losing in the final of the British open pairs 2016 all while partnering Andy Chalmers. He won the Scottish open pairs 2017 title with Kevin McDine. His most recent success came in the BDO Gold cup singles tournament 2017 which he won beating Wayne Warren 6–3 in the final.

=== PDC ===
==== 2018 ====
Joyce attended Q-School for the first time in 2018 and earned a two–year PDC Tour Card by finishing 10th on the UK Q-School Order of Merit.

Joyce made his Players Championship Finals debut at the 2018 edition as the 27th seed. He lost to the 38th seed Steve Lennon 6–2 in the first round.

Joyce made his debut at the 2019 PDC World Darts Championship, whitewashing both Anastasia Dobromyslova and Simon Whitlock 3–0, then defeating both Alan Norris and James Wade 4–3 in sets. However, he was beaten in the quarter-finals by the eventual winner Michael van Gerwen 5–1.

==== 2020 ====
In July 2020, at Players Championship 10, the second Players Championship event of the Summer Series, Joyce won his first PDC title, coming back from 7–3 down to defeat Dave Chisnall 8–7 in the final.

==== 2023 ====
On the 2023 PDC Pro Tour, Joyce was the runner-up at Players Championship 16 and Players Championship 24. In October Joyce won his second PDC title, defeating Gerwyn Price 8–7 in the final of Players Championship 26.

In November 2023, Joyce reached a first major televised semi-final at the 2023 Players Championship Finals, losing 11–3 to eventual champion Luke Humphries.

==== 2024 ====
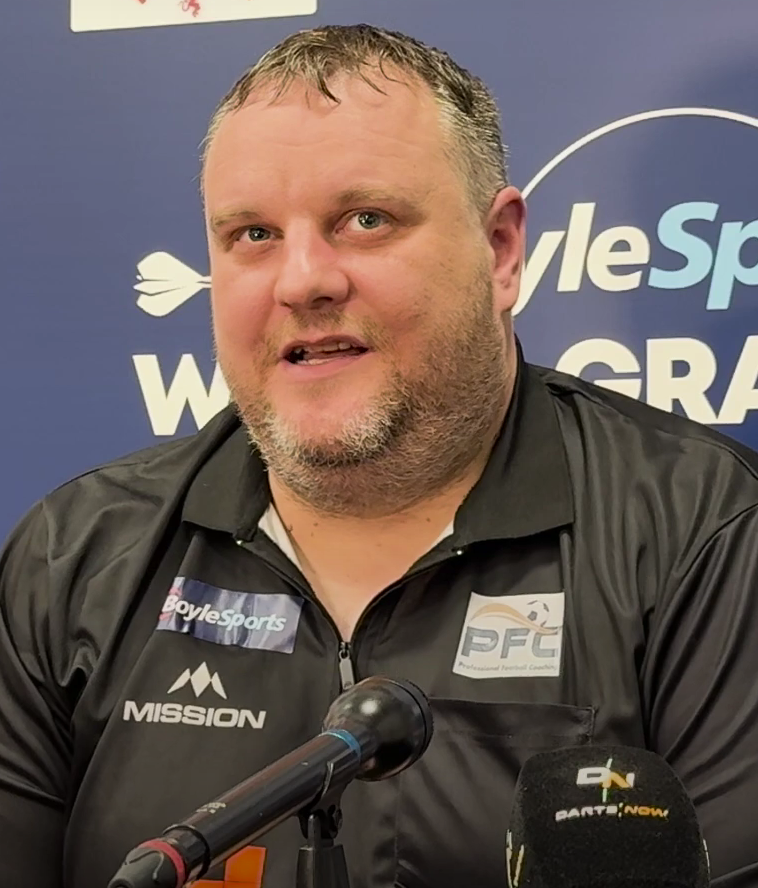
Joyce at the 2024 World Grand Prix

On the 2024 PDC Pro Tour, Joyce was the runner-up at Players Championship 9, losing to Michael Smith 8–6 in the final.

At the 2024 World Grand Prix Joyce reached the semi-finals, defeating Josh Rock 2–0 in sets, Nathan Aspinall 3–2 in a deciding leg in set 5, and Rob Cross also 3–2, before being whitewashed 5–0 by Luke Humphries.

==== 2025 ====
Joyce reached the fourth round of the 2025 World Championship. His run included victories over Danny Noppert and Ryan Searle. He went to a deciding set against eventual champion Luke Littler, but he was beaten 4–3. In March 2025, Joyce reached his first PDC European Tour final at the 2025 European Darts Trophy, where he was defeated 8–4 by Nathan Aspinall. He made his European Championship debut in October, being eliminated by eventual champion Gian van Veen in the quarter-finals.

==== 2026 ====
Joyce was eliminated in the second round of the 2026 World Championship in a 3–1 defeat to Krzysztof Ratajski. He reached his second European Tour final at the Baltic Sea Darts Open in May, where he lost 8–4 to Luke Woodhouse.

== Style of play ==
Joyce is known as an accurate double hitter, particularly on the double 16 segment of the board.

== Personal life ==
Joyce has admitted suffering from a fear of flying, this impacting on his willingness to attend European Tour events.

== World Championship results ==
=== BDO ===
- 2017: First round: (lost to Martin Adams 2–3)

=== PDC ===
- 2019: Quarter-finals (lost to Michael van Gerwen 1–5)
- 2020: First round (lost to Jan Dekker 2–3)
- 2021: Second round (lost to Krzysztof Ratajski 0–3)
- 2022: Second round (lost to Mervyn King 2–3)
- 2023: First round (lost to Scott Williams 1–3)
- 2024: Second round (lost to Stephen Bunting 0–3)
- 2025: Fourth round (lost to Luke Littler 3–4)
- 2026: Second round (lost to Krzysztof Ratajski 1–3)

== Performance timeline ==
Joyce's performance timeline is as follows:

=== BDO ===
Tournament	2014	2016	2017
BDO Ranked televised events
World Championship	DNP		1R
World Trophy	DNP	1R	DNP
World Masters	4R	1R	3R
Career statistics
Year-end ranking	183	36	104

=== PDC ===
Tournament	2018	2019	2020	2021	2022	2023	2024	2025	2026
PDC Ranked televised events
World Championship	DNP	QF	1R	2R	2R	1R	2R	4R	2R
World Masters	Did not qualify							Prel.	1R
UK Open	DNQ	4R	4R	4R	4R	3R	3R	6R	5R
World Matchplay	DNQ		1R	DNQ			1R	1R	1R
World Grand Prix	DNQ		2R	DNQ			SF	1R	QF
European Championship	Did not qualify							QF	1R
Grand Slam	DNQ		RR	2R	DNQ		2R	DNQ	
Players Championship Finals	1R	1R	1R	2R	3R	SF	QF	2R	DNQ
PDC Non-ranked televised events
World Series Finals	DNQ				QF	DNQ			
Career statistics
Year-end ranking	51	42	44	34	44	37	33	24	

=== PDC European Tour ===
Season	1	2	3	4	5	6	7	8	9	10	11	12	13	14	15
2018	Did not qualify					DDM; 2R	GDT; DNQ	DDO; 2R	EDM; 2R	GDC; 2R	DDC; DNQ	IDO; DNQ	EDT; 2R		
2019	Did not qualify						DDM; 1R	DDO; 2R	CDO; DNQ	ADC; DNQ	EDM; 1R	IDO; DNQ	GDT; 2R		
2022	IDO; WD	Did not qualify					EDG; 1R	Did not qualify					GDT; 3R		
2023	BSD; 1R	EDO; 2R	Did not qualify						EDG; WD	EDM; 3R	GDO; DNQ	HDT; DNQ	GDC; 1R		
2024	BDO; 3R	GDG; 3R	IDO; DNP	EDG; DNP	ADO; 1R	BSD; 1R	DDC; 1R	EDO; WD	GDC; 2R	FDT; 3R	HDT; WD	SDT; WD	CDO; WD		
2025	BDO; 1R	EDT; F	IDO; DNQ	GDG; QF	ADO; SF	EDG; 1R	DDC; 2R	EDO; 2R	BSD; WD	FDT; 3R	CDO; 2R	HDT; 2R	SDT; 3R	GDC; 3R	
2026	PDO; 1R	EDT; 1R	BDO; QF	GDG; 2R	EDG; WD	ADO; 3R	IDO; QF	BSD; F	SDO; 3R	EDO; 3R	HDT; 2R	CDO; 2R	FDT; QF	SDT; WD	DDC; 2R

=== PDC Players Championships ===
Season	1	2	3	4	5	6	7	8	9	10	11	12	13	14	15	16	17	18	19	20	21	22	23	24	25	26	27	28	29	30	31	32	33	34
2018	BAR; SF	BAR; QF	BAR; 3R	BAR; 2R	MIL; 3R	MIL; 4R	BAR; 4R	BAR; 4R	WIG; 4R	WIG; 1R	MIL; 4R	MIL; 2R	WIG; 3R	WIG; 1R	BAR; 1R	BAR; 4R	BAR; 3R	BAR; 2R	DUB; 1R	DUB; 1R	BAR; 2R	BAR; 1R												
2019	WIG; 2R	WIG; 3R	WIG; 3R	WIG; 1R	BAR; 3R	BAR; 4R	WIG; 2R	WIG; 3R	BAR; 1R	BAR; 2R	BAR; 1R	BAR; 1R	BAR; 1R	BAR; QF	BAR; 2R	BAR; 1R	WIG; 1R	WIG; 1R	BAR; QF	BAR; 1R	HIL; 1R	HIL; 3R	BAR; 1R	BAR; 1R	BAR; 3R	BAR; 3R	DUB; SF	DUB; 1R	BAR; 1R	BAR; 1R				
2020	BAR; 1R	BAR; 3R	WIG; 3R	WIG; 1R	WIG; 4R	WIG; 2R	BAR; 1R	BAR; 1R	MIL; 1R	MIL; W	MIL; 1R	MIL; 2R	MIL; 2R	NIE; 1R	NIE; 1R	NIE; 1R	NIE; 1R	NIE; 3R	COV; 1R	COV; 4R	COV; 3R	COV; 1R	COV; QF											
2021	BOL; 1R	BOL; 3R	BOL; 2R	BOL; 2R	MIL; QF	MIL; 2R	MIL; 1R	MIL; 3R	NIE; 1R	NIE; 1R	NIE; 2R	NIE; 2R	MIL; 2R	MIL; 2R	MIL; 3R	MIL; 3R	COV; 4R	COV; 1R	COV; SF	COV; 3R	BAR; 3R	BAR; 2R	BAR; 4R	BAR; 3R	BAR; 2R	BAR; 3R	BAR; 3R	BAR; 4R	BAR; 3R	BAR; 2R				
2022	BAR; 2R	BAR; 1R	WIG; 1R	WIG; 4R	BAR; 2R	BAR; 2R	NIE; DNP		BAR; 2R	BAR; 3R	BAR; 2R	BAR; 3R	BAR; 2R	WIG; 3R	WIG; SF	NIE; DNP		BAR; 1R	BAR; 3R	BAR; 2R	BAR; 1R	BAR; 1R	BAR; 2R	BAR; 1R	BAR; 1R	BAR; 2R	BAR; 3R	BAR; 1R	BAR; 2R	BAR; 2R				
2023	BAR; 1R	BAR; 2R	BAR; 2R	BAR; 1R	BAR; 3R	BAR; 2R	HIL; 1R	HIL; 2R	WIG; 1R	WIG; 1R	LEI; 4R	LEI; 2R	HIL; DNP		LEI; 2R	LEI; F	HIL; 3R	HIL; 3R	BAR; SF	BAR; 2R	BAR; 1R	BAR; 3R	BAR; 4R	BAR; F	BAR; 3R	BAR; W	BAR; 4R	BAR; 2R	BAR; 2R	BAR; 2R				
2024	WIG; 2R	WIG; 4R	LEI; 1R	LEI; 2R	HIL; DNP		LEI; 1R	LEI; 2R	HIL; F	HIL; 4R	HIL; DNP		MIL; 1R	MIL; SF	MIL; 1R	MIL; 4R	MIL; 4R	MIL; 2R	MIL; 1R	WIG; 3R	WIG; 1R	LEI; 1R	LEI; 2R	WIG; 2R	WIG; QF	WIG; 3R	WIG; 2R	WIG; QF	LEI; 2R	LEI; 2R				
2025	WIG; 1R	WIG; 1R	ROS; 1R	ROS; 4R	LEI; 1R	LEI; 4R	HIL; 1R	HIL; 2R	LEI; 2R	LEI; 1R	LEI; 2R	LEI; 2R	ROS; DNP		HIL; 4R	HIL; 1R	LEI; 1R	LEI; 1R	LEI; 4R	LEI; 1R	LEI; 3R	HIL; 1R	HIL; QF	MIL; 3R	MIL; 2R	HIL; DNP		LEI; 3R	LEI; 3R	LEI; 4R	WIG; 3R	WIG; 2R	WIG; SF	WIG; 2R
2026	HIL; 1R	HIL; 1R	WIG; 3R	WIG; 3R	LEI; 1R	LEI; 2R	LEI; 1R	LEI; 1R	WIG; 1R	WIG; 3R	MIL; 1R	MIL; 1R	HIL; DNP	HIL; 1R	LEI; 2R	LEI; 2R	LEI; 1R	LEI; 4R	MIL; 3R	MIL; 1R	WIG; 1R	WIG; 3R	LEI; 2R	LEI; 2R	HIL; DNP		LEI; 2R	LEI; 3R	ROS; DNP				LEI; 3R	LEI; 1R

Performance Table Legend
W	Won the tournament	F	Finalist	SF	Semifinalist	QF	Quarterfinalist	#R; RR; Prel.	Lost in # round Round-robin; Preliminary round	DQ	Disqualified
DNQ	Did not qualify	DNP	Did not participate	WD	Withdrew	NH	Tournament not held	#R; RR; Prel.	Lost in # round Round-robin; Preliminary round	NYF	Not yet founded
