= 2024 World Grand Prix (darts) =

2024 BoyleSports World Grand Prix

Tournament information
- Dates: 7–13 October 2024
- Venue: Leicester Arena
- Location: Leicester, England
- Organisation(s): Professional Darts Corporation (PDC)
- Format: Sets "Double in, Double out"
- Prize fund: £600,000
- Winner's share: £120,000
- High checkout: 170; Gian van Veen; Dimitri Van den Bergh

Champion(s)
- Mike De Decker (BEL)

The 2024 BoyleSports World Grand Prix was a darts tournament and the 27th staging of the World Grand Prix. It took place from 7–13 October 2024 at the Leicester Arena in Leicester, England.

Luke Humphries was the defending champion after defeating Gerwyn Price 5–2 in the 2023 final. He was defeated in the final 4–6 by Mike De Decker, who won his first TV title.

== Format ==
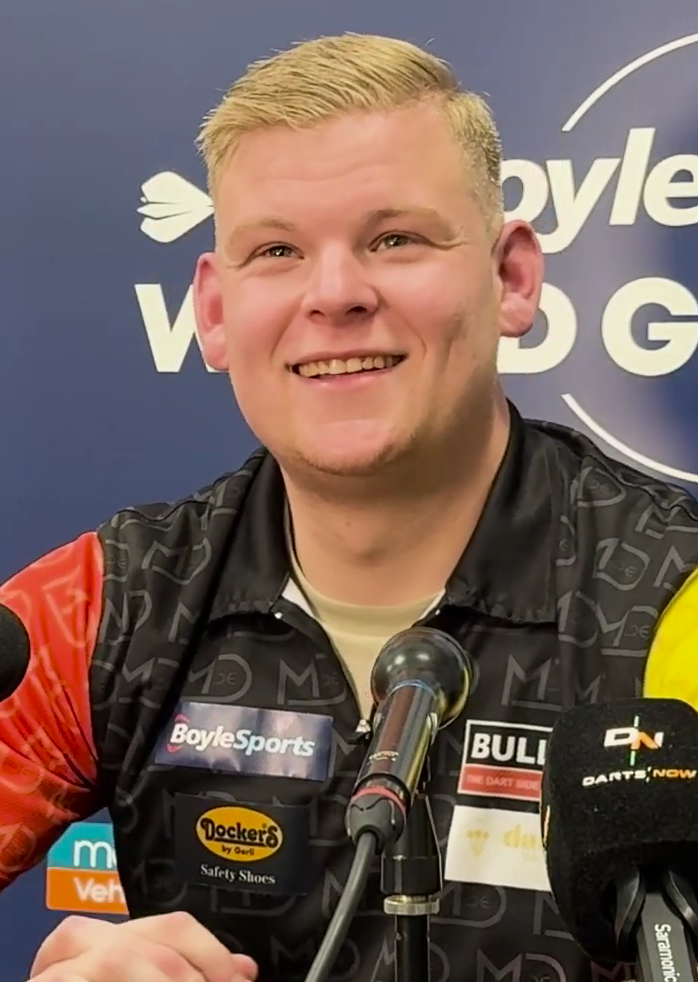
Mike De Decker, 2024 World Grand Prix champion, in an interview after the final

All matches were played as double in, double out; requiring the players to score 501 points to win a leg, beginning with as well as finishing on either a double or the bullseye. Matches were played to set format, with each set being the best of five legs (first to three).

This is the only "double in" tournament on the PDC circuit, and along with the PDC World Darts Championship the only tournament which uses the set format.

On 25 April, it was announced that the semi-finals and final had been extended to best of 9 and best of 11 sets respectively.

Round	Best of (sets)	First to (sets)
First	3	2
Second	5	3
Quarter-finals	5	3
Semi-finals	9	5
Final	11	6

== Prize money ==
The prize fund remained at £600,000.

The following is the breakdown of the fund:

Position (num. of players)		Prize money (Total: £600,000)
Winner	(1)	£120,000
Runner-Up	(1)	£60,000
Semi-finalists	(2)	£40,000
Quarter-finalists	(4)	£25,000
Last 16 (second round) losers	(8)	£15,000
Last 32 (first round) losers	(16)	£7,500

== Qualification ==
The field of 32 players consisted of the top 16 on the PDC Order of Merit and the top 16 non-qualified players from the ProTour Order of Merit as of 30 September. The top eight players on the Order of Merit were seeded for the tournament. The field was confirmed on 30 September 2024.

Luke Littler, Gian van Veen, Ricardo Pietreczko, Ritchie Edhouse and Cameron Menzies made their debuts in the event.

The following players qualified for the tournament:

=== PDC Order of Merit ===
1. Luke Humphries (runner-up)
2. Michael Smith (first round)
3. Michael van Gerwen (first round)
4. Rob Cross (quarter-finals)
5. Nathan Aspinall (second round)
6. Dave Chisnall (second round)
7. Gerwyn Price (second round)
8. Jonny Clayton (quarter-finals)
9. Damon Heta (first round)
10. Ross Smith (second round)
11. Peter Wright (first round)
12. Chris Dobey (first round)
13. Dimitri Van den Bergh (semi-finals)
14. Stephen Bunting (first round)
15. Danny Noppert (first round)
16. Josh Rock (first round)

=== PDC ProTour Qualifiers ===
1. Ryan Searle (first round)
2. Luke Littler (first round)
3. Martin Schindler (second round)
4. Gary Anderson (second round)
5. Gian van Veen (first round)
6. Daryl Gurney (second round)
7. Ricardo Pietreczko (second round)
8. Raymond van Barneveld (first round)
9. Ritchie Edhouse (first round)
10. Ryan Joyce (semi-finals)
11. Cameron Menzies (first round)
12. James Wade (quarter-finals)
13. Mike De Decker (champion)
14. Joe Cullen (quarter-finals)
15. Brendan Dolan (first round)
16. Luke Woodhouse (first round)

== Schedule ==
Monday, 7 October

Match #	Round	Player 1	Score	Player 2	Set 1	Set 2	Set 3
01	1	Josh Rock 80.64	0–2	Ryan Joyce 85.93	2–3	0–3	—N/a
02	1	Brendan Dolan 81.55	0–2	Martin Schindler 89.95	0–3	2–3	—N/a
03	1	Jonny Clayton 93.71	2–0	Ritchie Edhouse 86.35	3–1	3–2	—N/a
04	1	Nathan Aspinall 92.92	2–1	Ryan Searle 93.43	3–1	0–3	3–2
05	1	Raymond van Barneveld 79.87	1–2	Ricardo Pietreczko 83.29	2–3	3–2	0–3
06	1	Luke Humphries 89.87	2–1	Stephen Bunting 87.19	0–3	3–2	3–1
07	1	Rob Cross 91.99	2–1	Luke Littler 94.03	3–2	2–3	3–1
08	1	Gian van Veen 94.67	0–2	Ross Smith 101.79	0–3	1–3	—N/a

Tuesday, 8 October

Match #	Round	Player 1	Score	Player 2	Set 1	Set 2	Set 3
09	1	Dave Chisnall 91.09	2–0	Cameron Menzies 81.06	3–0	3–0	—N/a
10	1	Luke Woodhouse 96.33	1–2	Dimitri Van den Bergh 97.18	3–1	1–3	1–3
11	1	Mike De Decker 92.01	2–1	Damon Heta 94.54	3–2	1–3	3–2
12	1	Peter Wright 84.87	1–2	James Wade 90.44	3–2	1–3	0–3
13	1	Gerwyn Price 83.33	2–1	Danny Noppert 85.88	3–1	2–3	3–2
14	1	Michael Smith 89.13	1–2	Gary Anderson 90.89	3–1	1–3	2–3
15	1	Michael van Gerwen 86.94	0–2	Daryl Gurney 92.97	0–3	0–3	—N/a
16	1	Chris Dobey 85.05	1–2	Joe Cullen 93.22	3–1	1–3	0–3

Wednesday, 9 October

Match #	Round	Player 1	Score	Player 2	Set 1	Set 2	Set 3	Set 4	Set 5
17	2	Nathan Aspinall 91.16	2–3	Ryan Joyce 87.20	3–2	2–3	1–3	3–2	2–3
18	2	Rob Cross 86.90	3–1	Martin Schindler 83.48	3–0	0–3	3–2	3–1	—N/a
19	2	Luke Humphries 92.01	3–1	Ricardo Pietreczko 91.73	3–0	1–3	3–1	3–1	—N/a
20	2	Jonny Clayton 80.32	3–1	Ross Smith 86.11	0–3	3–1	3–2	3–1	—N/a

Thursday, 10 October

Match #	Round	Player 1	Score	Player 2	Set 1	Set 2	Set 3	Set 4	Set 5
21	2	Gary Anderson 87.69	0–3	Mike De Decker 95.74	0–3	2–3	2–3	—N/a	
22	2	Gerwyn Price 84.55	0–3	James Wade 90.01	2–3	1–3	1–3	—N/a	
23	2	Daryl Gurney 80.10	2–3	Joe Cullen 82.52	3–1	2–3	3–0	0–3	0–3
24	2	Dave Chisnall 86.76	1–3	Dimitri Van den Bergh 88.48	3–1	0–3	2–3	2–3	—N/a

Friday, 11 October

Match #	Round	Player 1	Score	Player 2	Set 1	Set 2	Set 3	Set 4	Set 5
25	QF	Mike De Decker 91.64	3–0	James Wade 91.26	3–2	3–2	3–2	—N/a	
26	QF	Rob Cross 87.16	2–3	Ryan Joyce 89.45	3–1	2–3	1–3	3–2	1–3
27	QF	Luke Humphries 86.60	3–1	Jonny Clayton 82.08	3–1	1–3	3–2	3–2	—N/a
28	QF	Joe Cullen 79.65	1–3	Dimitri Van den Bergh 86.43	3–2	1–3	1–3	1–3	—N/a

Saturday, 12 October

Match #	Round	Player 1	Score	Player 2	Set 1	Set 2	Set 3	Set 4	Set 5	Set 6	Set 7	Set 8	Set 9
29	SF	Mike De Decker 86.32	5–2	Dimitri Van den Bergh 81.40	0–3	3–2	3–0	3–0	1–3	3–0	3–1	—N/a	
30	SF	Luke Humphries 100.30	5–0	Ryan Joyce 94.42	3–0	3–2	3–1	3–0	3–0	—N/a			

Sunday, 13 October

Match #	Round	Player 1	Score	Player 2	Set 1	Set 2	Set 3	Set 4	Set 5	Set 6	Set 7	Set 8	Set 9	Set 10	Set 11
31	F	Luke Humphries 90.56	4–6	Mike De Decker 92.06	3–2	2–3	0–3	1–3	2–3	3–2	3–1	3–2	1–3	2–3	—N/a

== Draw ==
The draw was made on 30 September.

First round (best of 3 sets); 7–8 October
1	Luke Humphries 89.97	2
Stephen Bunting 87.19	1
Raymond van Barneveld 79.87	1
Ricardo Pietreczko 83.29	2
8	Jonny Clayton 93.71	2
Ritchie Edhouse 86.35	0
Gian van Veen 94.67	0
Ross Smith 101.79	2
4	Rob Cross 91.99	2
Luke Littler 94.03	1
Brendan Dolan 81.55	0
Martin Schindler 89.95	2
5	Nathan Aspinall 92.92	2
Ryan Searle 93.43	1
Josh Rock 80.64	0
Ryan Joyce 85.93	2
2	Michael Smith 89.13	1
Gary Anderson 90.89	2
Mike De Decker 92.01	2
Damon Heta 94.54	1
7	Gerwyn Price 83.33	2
Danny Noppert 85.88	1
Peter Wright 84.87	1
James Wade 90.44	2
3	Michael van Gerwen 86.94	0
Daryl Gurney 92.97	2
Chris Dobey 85.05	1
Joe Cullen 93.22	2
6	Dave Chisnall 91.09	2
Cameron Menzies 81.06	0
Luke Woodhouse 96.33	1
Dimitri Van den Bergh 97.18	2

Second round (best of 5 sets); 9–10 October
1	Luke Humphries 92.01	3
Ricardo Pietreczko 91.73	1
8	Jonny Clayton 80.32	3
Ross Smith 86.11	1
4	Rob Cross 86.90	3
Martin Schindler 83.48	1
5	Nathan Aspinall 91.16	2
Ryan Joyce 87.20	3
Gary Anderson 87.69	0
Mike De Decker 95.74	3
7	Gerwyn Price 84.55	0
James Wade 90.01	3
Daryl Gurney 80.10	2
Joe Cullen 82.52	3
6	Dave Chisnall 86.76	1
Dimitri Van den Bergh 88.48	3

Quarter-finals (best of 5 sets); 11 October
1	Luke Humphries 86.60	3
8	Jonny Clayton 82.08	1
4	Rob Cross 87.16	2
Ryan Joyce 89.45	3
Mike De Decker 91.64	3
James Wade 91.26	0
Joe Cullen 79.65	1
Dimitri Van den Bergh 86.43	3

Semi-finals (best of 9 sets); 12 October
1	Luke Humphries 100.30	5
Ryan Joyce 94.42	0
Mike De Decker 86.32	5
Dimitri Van den Bergh 81.40	2

Final (best of 11 sets); 13 October
1	Luke Humphries 90.56	4
Mike De Decker 92.06	6
