= PDC Pro Tour =

Series of darts tournaments

The PDC Pro Tour is a series of non-televised darts tournaments organised by the Professional Darts Corporation (PDC). Since 2019, the Pro Tour has comprised Players Championships and European Tour events; UK Open Qualifiers were previously a part of the tour until they were discontinued. Pro Tour events mainly consist of professional darts players who hold a PDC Tour Card, with the exception of amateur call-ups and European Tour regional qualifiers. Prize money won in these events counts towards players' ranking on the PDC Order of Merit, the main world ranking system used by the PDC. It also counts towards the PDC Pro Tour Order of Merit and separate European Tour and Players Championship rankings.

== Pro Tour Card ==
Since 2011, the PDC Pro Tour has operated a Tour Card system. 128 players are granted Tour Cards, which enables them to participate in all Players Championships.

In 2011, Tour Cards were awarded to:

- 101 players from the PDC Order of Merit after the 2011 World Championship
- 2 finalists from the 2010 PDC Women's World Championship
- 25 qualifiers from a four-day Qualifying School in Wigan (4 semi-finalists from each day, plus the top 9 players from the Q School Order of Merit)

Tour Cards were also offered to the four semi-finalists from the 2011 BDO World Championship, although none of the players took up the offer.

From 2012 to 2014, the PDC Tour Cards were awarded to:

- Top 64 players from the PDC Order of Merit after the World Championship (having competed in at least ten events)
- Tour Card holders from the previous year's Qualifying School
- Tour card holders from the previous year's invitations (BDO World Championship & PDC World Youth Championship)
- 4 semi-finalists from the 2012 BDO World Championship
- 2 finalists from the 2012 World Youth Championship
- At least 16 qualifiers from a four-day Qualifying School (more places will be awarded via this method if not all the above spaces are filled)

From 2015 onwards, the PDC withdrew the Tour Cards awarded to BDO semi-finalists. The new distribution of Tour Cards is as follows:

- Top 64 players from the PDC Order of Merit after the World Championship
- Tour Card holders from the previous year's Qualifying School
- Four tour card holders from the previous year's invitations (PDC Challenge Tour & PDC Development Tour)
- Two highest qualifiers from the PDC Challenge Tour, a series of tournaments for non-Tour Card holders
- Two highest qualifiers from the PDC Development Tour, a series of tournaments for youth players
- At least 16 qualifiers from a four-day Qualifying School

== Players Championships ==
Players Championships, originally known as PDPA Players Championships, are organised by the Professional Dart Players Association (PDPA) and have increased in number in recent years. They are known as "floor tournaments", because they usually feature 16 darts boards in close proximity on an arena floor where the tournament is played in the space of a day. Televised events differ by having just one main board on a stage with the audience and cameras situated around it.

=== Order of Merit ===
The prize money won in Players Championships count towards both the PDC Order of Merit and PDC Pro Tour Order of Merit rankings.

After each completion of each year's Players Championship season (34 events in 2025 & 2026), the top 64 money-earners compete in the Players Championship Finals, in which they are seeded purely on this basis with 1 v 64, 2 v 63, etc.

During 2007, the PDC and PDPA added further importance to Players Championships by changing qualification criteria for major televised events. A separate Players Championship Order of Merit was introduced which calculates players earnings for these tournaments only each calendar year. The players who won the most money (without qualifying automatically via the PDC Order of Merit) were awarded qualifying places at major tournaments, such as the World Matchplay, World Grand Prix and World Championship.

Previously, a sudden-death knockout qualifying tournament decided the players which meant players could miss out on tournaments because of unlucky matches or unlucky draws. The World Championship, however, still maintains an additional qualifying tournament – from which Kirk Shepherd emerged and went on to reach the world final itself in 2008. This was dropped for the 2010 running of the event, however it was reinstated for 2011.

=== Entries ===
PDPA members must enter events through the PDC's online entry system, while non-PDPA members must enter through the local organiser for the relevant event. There was previously an entry fee for all Players Championship events of £100 for Tour Card holders. The entry fee has subsequently been abolished.

In addition, seedings for Players Championship events are determined by a one-year rolling Players Championship Order of Merit, consisting of prize money won in Players Championships over the 12 months before that event. The top 32 players in the Order of Merit that have entered the tournament are seeded.

Players Championship events have a 128-player draw.

If fewer than 128 Tour Card holders enter a Players Championship event, places are awarded to PDC Challenge Tour players based on the Challenge Tour Order of Merit.

=== Prize money ===
The prize money for PDC Pro Tour events has increased steadily over the years. Prize money is awarded to all players who reach at least the last 64 of a Pro Tour event. In the past, Players Championships held outside of Europe awarded less prize money than those held in the United Kingdom or Europe.

In 2011, all Players Championship events and UK Open qualifiers awarded £34,600 each, but from 2013 on Players Championship events awarded £50,000.

Up to 2013 on the Pro Tour, there was also a rolling jackpot for nine-dart finishes. £500 (Players Championship events) / £400 (UK Open qualifiers) per event was reserved for any player who hit a nine-dart finish, with the money rolling over to the next event if the feat was not achieved. If more than one player hit a nine-darter in an event, the jackpot was shared.

Prize funds for Pro Tour events over the years:

Year	Winner	Runner-up	Semi-Finalists	Quarter-Finalists	Last 16	Last 32	Last 64	Total
2004–2008	£5,000	£2,500	£1,250	£600	£300	£150	£75	£19,600
2009	£6,000	£3,000	£1,500	£800	£400	£300	£200	£29,600
2010	£6,000	£3,000	£1,500	£1,000	£500	£300	£200	£31,200
2011–2012	£6,000	£3,000	£2,000	£1,000	£600	£400	£200	£34,600
2013	£10,000	£5,000	£2,500	£1,500	£1,000	£500	£250	£50,000
2014–2015	£10,000	£5,000	£2,500	£2,000	£1,500	£750	£250	£60,000
2016–2021	£10,000	£6,000	£3,000	£2,250	£1,500	£1,000	£500	£75,000
2022–2023	£12,000	£8,000	£4,000	£3,000	£2,000	£1,250	£750	£100,000
2024–2025	£15,000	£10,000	£5,000	£3,500	£2,500	£1,500	£1,000	£125,000
2026	£15,000	£10,000	£6,500	£4,000	£3,000	£2,000	£1,250	£150,000

== PDC European Tour ==
In 2012, the PDC introduced a series of five tournaments held across Europe known as the European Tour. The number of events has steadily risen with eight held in 2013 and 2014, nine in 2015, ten in 2016, twelve in 2017, thirteen from 2018 to 2024, fourteen in 2025 and fifteen in 2026. These events see the top 16 players on the PDC Order of Merit and PDC Pro Tour Order of Merit compete against players from a Tour Card qualifier, regional qualifiers and home nations qualifier (the country where the event is held). Currently the prize fund for each tournament is £175,000, with £30,000 going to the winner. These events differ from others held on the Pro Tour as they are played on one board in front of an audience. They are not televised, but selected events have been available on the PDC's YouTube channel in the past. All events are now shown live on PDC TV.

== UK Open Qualifiers ==
The UK Open is a major tournament that takes place each year in March at Butlin's Minehead. From 2003 to 2013 the tournament took place at Bolton's Reebok Stadium each year in June. Prior to the televised event, there were eight UK Open Qualifiers (originally named Regional Finals), where the prize money won was collated into a UK Open Order of Merit table which determined the 96 qualifiers for the UK Open finals in Bolton. From 2003 to 2015 there were ties and a preliminary round would be used to reduce the field to 96. In 2016 ties were scrapped and countback was used to separate players who were level.

The tournaments were organised similarly to the Players Championships in that 32 boards were in operation for a non-televised "floor tournament", completed in one day. During the 2007–08 UK Open, sponsors Blue Square streamed live coverage of these Regional Finals on the internet.

From 2011 until 2013, the UK Open Qualifiers were held on four double-header weekends instead of being held on eight Sundays. From 2014 onwards there were only 6 UK Open Qualifiers. UK Open Qualifiers were abolished in 2019, as all tour card holders were invited to the UK Open from then on.

== Players with 25 or more PDC Pro Titles ==
• Michael van Gerwen 91 (38 European Tour, 37 Players Championship, 16 UK Open Qualifiers)

• Phil Taylor 70

• Gary Anderson 39 (3 European Tour, 30 Players Championship, 6 UK Open Qualifiers)

• Peter Wright 34 (9 European Tour, 22 Players Championship, 3 UK Open Qualifiers)

• Gerwyn Price 32 (10 European Tour, 22 Players Championship)

• James Wade 27 (2 European Tour, 20 Players Championship, 2 UK Open Qualifiers)

• Dave Chisnall 26 (8 European Tour, 18 Players Championship)

== Pro Tour Order of Merit ==
The PDC Pro Tour Order of Merit is based on based on prize money won in Players Championship events and PDC European Tour events over a rolling 12-month period.

As of the 2026 PDC season, the rankings are used to determine the following:

- The top 32 players are seeded for Players Championship events
- The top 16 not-yet qualified players qualify for PDC European Tour events
- The top 16 not-yet qualified players qualify on the cut-off date for each qualify for the World Matchplay and World Grand Prix
- The top 40 not-yet qualified players qualify for the PDC World Darts Championship

PDC Pro Tour Order of Merit as of 13 May 2026.
Players ranked 1 - 32
Rank	Change	Player	Earnings
1	Steady	Wessel Nijman	263,000
2	▲1	Chris Dobey	175,750
3	▼1	Gerwyn Price	174,750
4	▲1	Stephen Bunting	161,000
5	▼1	Nathan Aspinall	157,750
6	▲2	Jonny Clayton	153,250
7	▼1	Danny Noppert	142,750
8	▲1	Jermaine Wattimena	138,500
9	▼2	Ross Smith	134,250
10	▲11	Josh Rock	132,250
11	▼1	Luke Humphries	130,500
12	▲2	Kevin Doets	121,250
13	▼2	James Wade	115,000
14	▲3	Niko Springer	114,000
15	▼2	Luke Woodhouse	111,250
16	Steady	Damon Heta	104,500
17	▲1	Luke Littler	101,500
18	▲2	Dirk van Duijvenbode	100,750
19	▼4	Gian van Veen	100,250
20	▲7	Andrew Gilding	99,750
21	▼9	Krzysztof Ratajski	98,250
22	▲2	Martin Schindler	97,000
23	▼1	Niels Zonneveld	93,000
24	▼5	Ryan Searle	92,500
25	▲1	Daryl Gurney	92,250
26	▼3	William O'Connor	91,750
27	▼2	Joe Cullen	81,500
28	▲1	Cameron Menzies	73,250
29	▲10	Michael van Gerwen	73,000
30	Steady	Ryan Joyce	72,250
31	Steady	Karel Sedláček	68,000
32	▲6	Rob Cross	65,250
*Change since 5 May 2026.

PDC Pro Tour Order of Merit as of 13 May 2026.
Players ranked 33 - 64
Rank	Change	Player	Earnings
33	▼1	Kim Huybrechts	64,750
34	▼6	Dave Chisnall	61,500
35	▼1	Michael Smith	57,500
36	▲1	Richard Veenstra	56,250
37	▼1	Sebastian Białecki	56,250
38	▲2	Alan Soutar	52,500
39	▼4	Mike De Decker	52,250
40	▲7	Mensur Suljović	51,500
41	▼8	Gary Anderson	51,250
42	▲6	Ritchie Edhouse	50,750
43	Steady	Bradley Brooks	48,750
44	▼3	Max Hopp	48,250
45	Steady	Lukas Wenig	47,750
46	▲3	Keane Barry	47,500
47	▼3	Ricardo Pietreczko	45,250
48	▲6	Mickey Mansell	45,000
49	▲19	Ian White	44,750
50	▲10	Madars Razma	44,250
51	Steady	Jeffrey de Graaf	44,250
52	▼6	Raymond van Barneveld	44,000
53	▲4	Beau Greaves	43,750
54	▼4	Callan Rydz	43,250
55	▼3	Tom Bissell	42,250
56	▲3	Justin Hood	41,250
57	▼15	Brendan Dolan	40,750
58	▼2	Cam Crabtree	40,500
59	▼1	Cor Dekker	39,750
60	▲12	Cristo Reyes	39,250
61	▲1	Maik Kuivenhoven	39,250
62	▲1	James Hurrell	38,500
63	▼8	Thibault Tricole	38,500
64	▼3	Gabriel Clemens	38,250
*Change since 5 May 2026.
