= Stefan Bellmont =

Swiss darts player (born 1989)

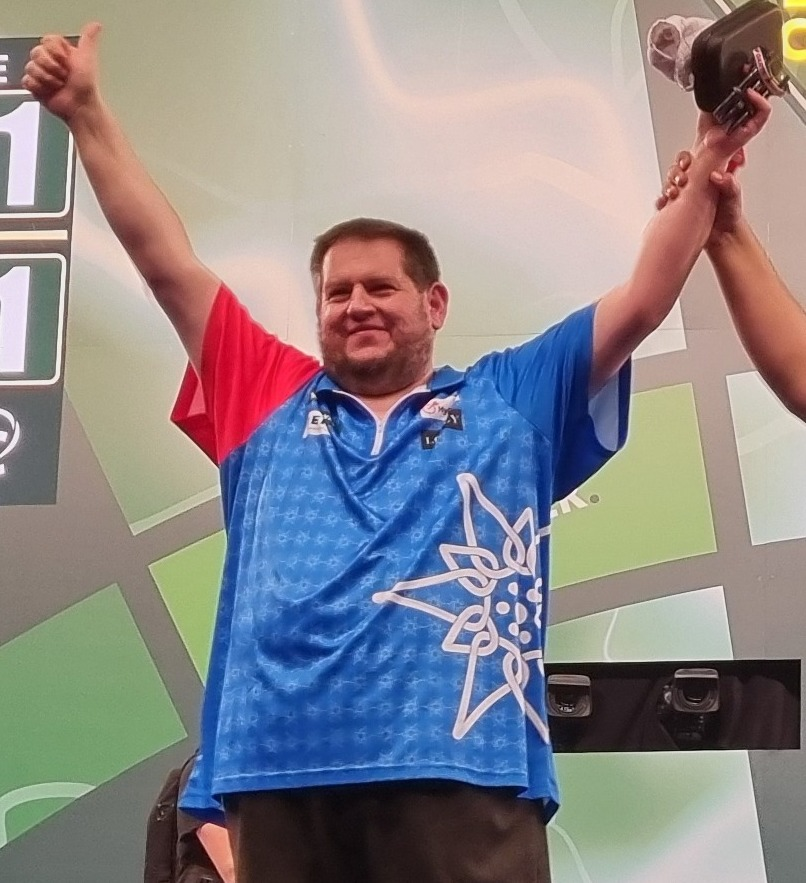
- Bellmont in 2024

Personal information
- Nickname: Belli
- Born: 3 May 1989 (age 37) Cham, Switzerland

Sport
- Sport: Darts
- Playing since: 2013
- Darts: 18.5g Loxley
- Laterality: Right-handed
- Walk-on music: "Lift U Up" by Gotthard

Organisation (see split in darts)
- BDO: 2015–2020
- PDC: 2019–present (Tour Card: 2026–present)
- WDF: 2022–2024
- Current world ranking: (PDC) 120 (29 October 2026)

WDF major events – best performances
- World Masters: Last 272: 2016

PDC premier events – best performances
- World Championship: Last 64: 2026
- UK Open: Last 160: 2025, 2026
- Grand Slam: Group Stage: 2025

Other tournament wins
- Years
PDC Challenge Tour (x5)	2022, 2024, 2025 (x3)
Helvetia Open	2024

Stefan Bellmont (born 3 May 1989) is a Swiss professional darts player who competes in Professional Darts Corporation (PDC) events. He is a one-time PDC ranking event semi-finalist. He has also won five titles on the PDC Challenge Tour, and won the World Darts Federation's Helvetia Open in 2024. In 2026 he became the first Swiss player to hold a PDC Tour Card after earning one through finishing first on the 2025 PDC Challenge Tour.

== Career ==
=== 2019 ===
Bellmont made his PDC European Tour debut at the 2019 European Darts Grand Prix, where he lost 6–2 to Jeffrey de Zwaan in the first round. He also qualified for the 2019 Czech Darts Open, but lost again 6–2 in the first round, this time to Danny Noppert.

=== 2022 ===
Bellmont represented Switzerland at 2022 PDC World Cup of Darts, along with Thomas Junghans. They lost to New Zealand 3–5 in the first round. In 2022, he qualified for three European Tour events, in each he lost in the first round. Bellmont won event 7 on the 2022 PDC Challenge Tour series, defeating Karel Sedláček 5–4, winning in a deciding leg.

=== 2023 ===
In 2023 he represented Switzerland again at 2023 PDC World Cup of Darts, this time partnering Marcel Walpen. In the new format of the event, they lost 3–4 to Italy and 1–4 to Sweden and were eliminated in the round robin group stage. During the year he qualified for two European Tour events, securing his first ever win on the stage against Robert Owen at the 2023 Belgian Darts Open. He lost to Rob Cross 4–6 in the second round. Bellmont secured another victory at the 2023 Czech Darts Open, where he defeated Rowby-John Rodriguez 6–4 in the first round. In the second round he lost 6–4 to Dimitri Van den Bergh.

=== 2024 ===
On the Challenge Tour, Bellmont made the semi-finals of event 1, losing there to eventual winner Richie Burnett 5–3. Bellmont won event 4, whitewashing Pál Székely 5–0 in the final. In June, he won his first World Darts Federation (WDF) title at the Helvetia Open in his home country of Switzerland, beating Mike Gillet of Wales 5–4 in the final. He reached the quarter-finals twice in the 2024 Players Championships. Bellmont took part in the West Europe qualifier for the 2025 PDC World Darts Championship on November 16, where he defeated Jimmy van Schie 7–6 in the final.

=== 2025 ===
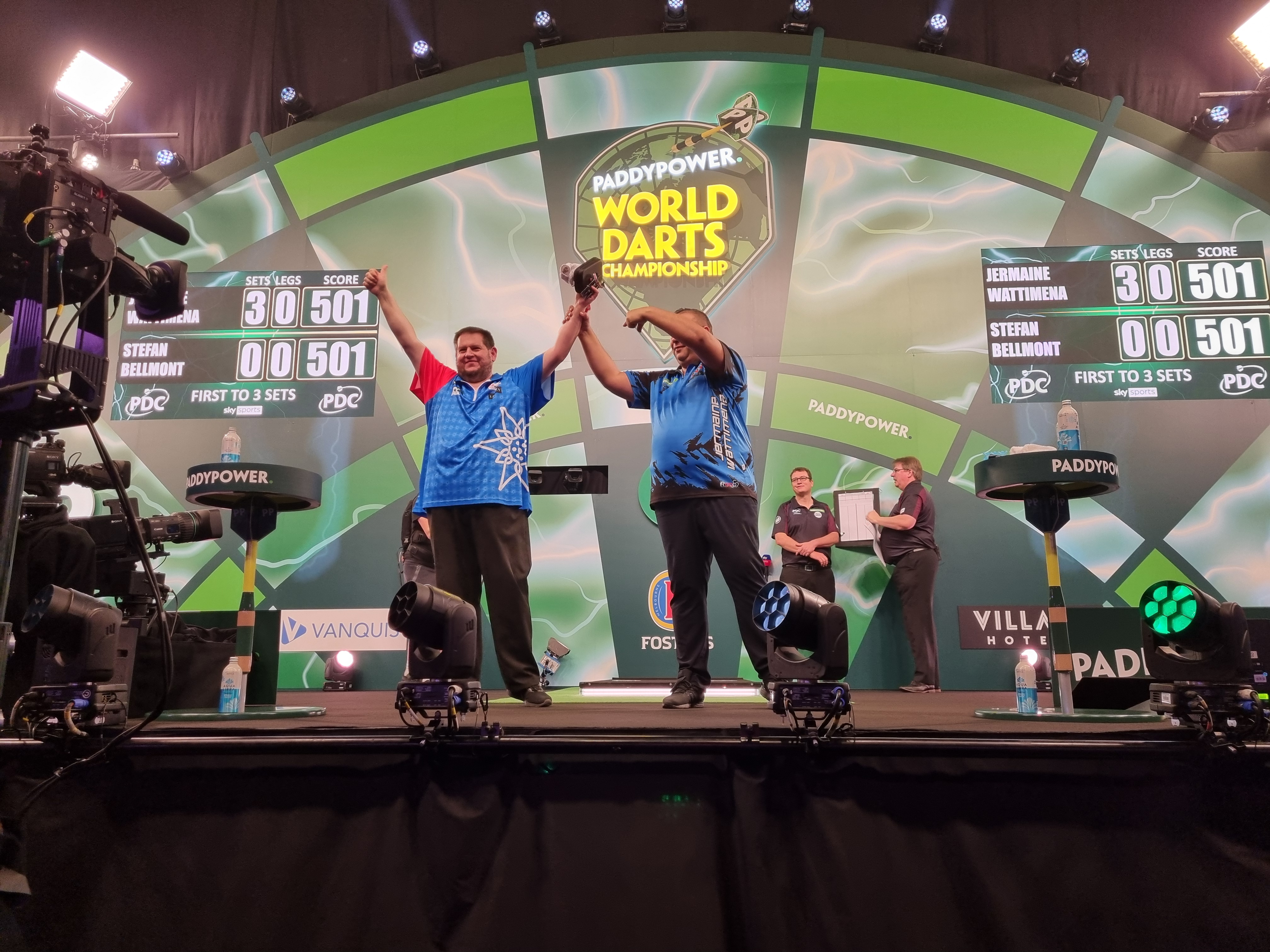
Bellmont (left) and Jermaine Wattimena on stage at the 2025 PDC World Darts Championship

Bellmont made his PDC World Darts Championship debut at the 2025 event, becoming the first player to represent Switzerland at the tournament. He lost 3–0 in sets to Jermaine Wattimena in the first round. Bellmont started the 2025 Challenge Tour season with a runner-up finish in the opening event, losing 5–4 to Beau Greaves. He won Challenge Tour 5 by defeating Danny Jansen 5–1 in the final. In February, Bellmont was the first Swiss player to reach the semi-final of a PDC ranking event as he lost 7–6 to Ryan Searle at Players Championship 4. He made his first appearance at the UK Open, but was defeated by Greaves in the first round.

Bellmont won a further two titles on the 2025 Challenge Tour, defeating Keegan Brown 5–3 to capture the event 14 title, and beating Daniel Ayres 5–3 to win event 23. He finished the season at the top of the Challenge Tour Order of Merit ranking, which secured him qualification for the 2025 Grand Slam of Darts and the 2026 PDC World Championship. His first-place finish also earned him a PDC Tour Card for the first time, becoming the first Swiss player to obtain one.

== Personal life ==
Bellmont is trained as a chef, and owns the Belli's Darts House pub in his hometown of Cham.

== World Championship results ==
=== PDC World Championship ===
- 2025: First round (lost to Jermaine Wattimena 0–3)
- 2026: Second round (lost to Damon Heta 2–3)

== Performance timeline ==
=== BDO ===
Tournament	2016	2019
BDO Ranked televised events
World Masters	1R	1R

=== PDC ===
Tournament	2022	2023	2024	2025	2026
PDC Ranked televised events
World Championship	Did not qualify			1R	2R
UK Open	Did not qualify			1R	1R
PDC Non-ranked televised events
World Cup	1R	RR	RR	2R	RR
Career statistics
Season-end ranking (PDC)	170	163	106	91	

==== European Tour ====
Tournament	2019	2020	2022	2023	2025	2026
European Grand Prix	1R	1R	1R	DNQ		
Czech Open	1R	NH	DNQ	2R	DNQ	
German Championship	DNQ		1R	DNQ		
Dutch Championship	NH		1R	DNQ		
Belgian Open	NH		DNQ	2R	DNQ	
Swiss Trophy	Not held				1R	2R

==== Players Championships ====
Season	1	2	3	4	5	6	7	8	9	10	11	12	13	14	15	16	17	18	19	20	21	22	23	24	25	26	27	28	29	30	31	32	33	34
2022 (Note: Not a Tour card holder)	Did not participate															NIE; 1R	NIE; 1R	DNP																
2023	DNP						HIL; 3R	HIL; 1R	DNP				HIL; 1R	HIL; 1R	DNP		HIL; 3R	HIL; 1R	DNP															
2024	WIG; 1R	WIG; 1R	LEI; 1R	LEI; 1R	HIL; 2R	HIL; 2R	LEI; 1R	LEI; QF	HIL; 1R	HIL; 1R	HIL; 1R	HIL; 1R	MIL; 1R	MIL; 3R	MIL; QF	MIL; 1R	MIL; 1R	MIL; 1R	MIL; 1R	DNP				WIG; 1R	WIG; 1R	WIG; 2R	DNP		LEI; 2R	LEI; 1R				
2025	WIG; 1R	WIG; 1R	ROS; 1R	ROS; SF	LEI; 1R	LEI; 2R	HIL; 1R	HIL; 1R	LEI; 2R	LEI; 3R	LEI; 1R	LEI; 1R	ROS; 1R	ROS; 1R	HIL; 1R	HIL; 2R	LEI; 1R	LEI; 1R	LEI; 1R	LEI; 1R	LEI; 1R	HIL; 2R	HIL; 1R	MIL; 1R	MIL; 1R	HIL; 1R	HIL; 1R	LEI; 2R	LEI; 1R	LEI; 1R	WIG; 1R	WIG; 2R	WIG; 1R	WIG; 1R
2026	HIL; 4R	HIL; 1R	WIG; 1R	WIG; 1R	LEI; 1R	LEI; 2R	LEI; 1R	LEI; 1R	WIG; 1R	WIG; 1R	MIL; 1R	MIL; 3R	HIL; 1R	HIL; 1R	LEI; 1R	LEI; 1R	LEI; 1R	LEI; 3R	MIL; 1R	MIL; 1R	WIG; 2R	WIG; 2R	LEI; 2R	LEI; 1R	HIL; 1R	HIL; 1R	LEI; 2R	LEI; 1R	ROS; 2R	ROS; 2R	ROS; 1R	ROS; 2R	LEI; 1R	LEI; 2R

==== Challenge Tour ====
Season	1	2	3	4	5	6	7	8	9	10	11	12	13	14	15	16	17	18	19	20	21	22	23	24
2024	SF	L128	L128	W	L32	L64	L128	L128	QF	L128	L32	L64	L128	L128	L128	L256	L256	L128	L64	L256	QF	L16	QF	L128
2025	F	L16	L16	L256	W	L128	L32	QF	L64	L32	L256	L64	QF	W	L128	L128	L256	L128	L128	L128	L16	L16	W	L16

Performance Table Legend
W	Won the tournament	F	Finalist	SF	Semifinalist	QF	Quarterfinalist	#R; RR; L#	Lost in # round Round-robin; Last # stage	DQ	Disqualified
DNQ	Did not qualify	DNP	Did not participate	WD	Withdrew	NH	Tournament not held	#R; RR; L#	Lost in # round Round-robin; Last # stage	NYF	Not yet founded
