= Dom Taylor =

English darts player (born 1998)

Personal information
- Full name: Dominic Taylor
- Nickname: "The Tower"
- Born: 15 April 1998 (age 28) Bristol, England

Sport
- Sport: Darts
- Playing since: 2014
- Darts: 24g Target
- Laterality: Right-handed
- Walk-on music: "Crazy Train" by Ozzy Osbourne

Organisation (see split in darts)
- PDC: 2019–2025 (Tour Card: 2024–2025)

PDC premier events – best performances
- World Championship: Last 64: 2026
- UK Open: Last 96: 2025
- PC Finals: Last 64: 2025

Other tournament wins
- Years
PDC Challenge Tour	2023
PDC Development Tour	2021

Dominic Taylor (born 15 April 1998) is an English darts player who has competed in Professional Darts Corporation (PDC) events. He is a three-time semi-finalist in PDC Players Championship events. He won a PDC Development Tour title in 2021 and a PDC Challenge Tour title in 2023.

Following an initial one-month ban from events sanctioned by the Darts Regulation Authority (DRA) in 2024 due to a failed drugs test, Taylor received a six-month ban after a second offence at the 2026 PDC World Darts Championship, where he was withdrawn from the tournament prior to his second-round match.

== Career ==
=== 2019 ===
Taylor began playing in PDC events in 2019, featuring on the PDC Development Tour. He qualified for the 2019 PDC World Youth Championship but failed to get out of his group with Ben Cheeseman and Connor Scutt.

=== 2021 ===
His results on the Development Tour in 2020 saw him make his PDC premier event debut at the 2021 UK Open. He won his first round game but was whitewashed 6–0 by Gary Blades in the second round.

Taylor achieved early success on the 2021 UK Development Tour, reaching the final in each of the first four events, including the third event where he won his first Development Tour title, defeating Jack Male 5–4 in legs in the final. He finished the year 4th on the 2021 UK Development Tour Order of Merit.

=== 2023 ===
Taylor picked up his first PDC Challenge Tour title in 2023, winning the final 5–2 against Cam Crabtree. Taylor received multiple invitations to play in PDC Players Championship events due to his success on the Challenge Tour in 2023. He reached the semi finals of Players Championship 28, bowing out to eventual champion Ross Smith.

=== 2024 ===
Taylor played at 2024 PDC UK Qualifying School (Q-School) in order to obtain a Tour Card. He lost in the Day Two final 6–2 against Robert Grundy. However, he won his tour card outright by winning the Day Four final 6–1 against Joshua Richardson. Taylor reached the quarter-finals at Players Championship 24, averaging 103.65 in a 6–5 defeat to Gary Anderson who averaged 108.78.

Taylor was due to play in the Players Championship Finals, where he was supposed to face former world champion Michael Smith in the first round. However, it was announced before the tournament that the Darts Regulation Authority (DRA) had suspended Taylor as a result of a positive drugs test taken at a Players Championship event. Taylor was replaced in the event by Nick Kenny.

=== 2025 ===
Taylor had originally qualified for the 2025 PDC World Darts Championship via the Pro Tour Order of Merit, but was replaced by Robert Owen. Taylor received a one-month ban, reduced from a potential two years, after the banned substance was found to not be performance-enhancing and was ingested out of competition. He also committed to a UK Anti-Doping-approved three-month treatment programme. He was originally expected to return to competition at the 2025 PDC World Masters, but withdrew prior to the preliminary round. Taylor returned for the 2025 PDC Players Championship series.

On the 2025 PDC Pro Tour, Taylor made two Pro Tour semi-finals by reaching the last four at two Players Championship events.

=== 2026 ===
Taylor qualified for the 2026 PDC World Championship and won his first-round match 3–0 against Oskar Lukasiak. On 19 December 2025, it was announced that Taylor had been provisionally suspended by the DRA after failing a second drugs test, which was conducted by the PDC and the DRA on 14 December. He was removed from the tournament and his scheduled second-round opponent, Jonny Clayton, received a bye to the third round. Taylor issued an apology on his Facebook page in which he stated that personal traumas had affected his mental health and contributed to his situation. At a hearing on 7 January 2026, Taylor was handed a mandatory six-month ban for his second violation, having tested positive for cocaine and cannabis. In addition to the ban, he was made to pay £1,275 in costs and forfeited his £25,000 prize money earned at the World Championship, resulting in him falling outside the top 64 on the PDC Order of Merit and the loss of his PDC Tour Card. Taylor returned to competition in July, competing in local tournaments and a World Darts Federation (WDF) event in Gibraltar.

== World Championship results ==
=== PDC ===
- 2026: Second round (suspended due to doping violation)

== Performance timeline ==
Tournament	2019	2020	2021	2022	2023	2024	2025	2026
PDC Ranked televised events
World Championship	Did not qualify						DQ	2R
World Masters	Did not qualify						WD	DNP
UK Open	DNQ		2R	1R	1R	2R	3R	DNP
Players Championship Finals	Did not qualify					DQ	1R	DNP
PDC Non-ranked televised events
World Youth Championship	RR	2R	RR	RR	Did not participate			
Career statistics
Season-end ranking (PDC)	-	191	-	-	137	83	68	

=== PDC European Tour ===
Tournament	2024
Austrian Open	2R
Dutch Championship	2R
European Open	2R
German Championship	2R

=== PDC Players Championships ===
Season	1	2	3	4	5	6	7	8	9	10	11	12	13	14	15	16	17	18	19	20	21	22	23	24	25	26	27	28	29	30	31	32	33	34
2020 (Note: Not a Tour card holder)	DNP							BAR; 3R	Did not participate																									
2023	Did not participate								WIG; 2R	DNP		LEI; 2R	HIL; 2R	HIL; 3R	Did not participate							BAR; 3R	BAR; DNP	BAR; 3R	BAR; DNP			BAR; SF	BAR; DNP	BAR; 3R				
2024	WIG; 3R	WIG; 1R	LEI; 1R	LEI; 1R	HIL; 1R	HIL; 4R	LEI; 2R	LEI; 3R	HIL; 1R	HIL; 4R	HIL; 2R	HIL; 4R	MIL; 3R	MIL; 4R	MIL; 1R	MIL; 1R	MIL; 2R	MIL; 2R	MIL; 3R	WIG; 1R	WIG; 1R	MIL; 1R	MIL; 2R	WIG; QF	WIG; 2R	WIG; 2R	WIG; 2R	WIG; 2R	LEI; 1R	LEI; 1R				
2025	WIG; 2R	WIG; 1R	ROS; 3R	ROS; SF	LEI; 4R	LEI; 3R	HIL; 1R	HIL; SF	LEI; 1R	LEI; 2R	LEI; 1R	LEI; 1R	ROS; 1R	ROS; 1R	HIL; QF	HIL; 2R	LEI; 2R	LEI; 1R	LEI; 1R	HIL; 4R	HIL; 3R	MIL; 2R	MIL; 1R	MIL; 1R	HIL; 3R	HIL; 1R	LEI; 3R	LEI; 2R	LEI; 2R	WIG; 2R	WIG; 2R	WIG; 2R	WIG; 1R	WIG; 4R

Performance Table Legend
W	Won the tournament	F	Finalist	SF	Semifinalist	QF	Quarterfinalist	#R; RR; Prel.	Lost in # round Round-robin; Preliminary round	DQ	Disqualified
DNQ	Did not qualify	DNP	Did not participate	WD	Withdrew	NH	Tournament not held	#R; RR; Prel.	Lost in # round Round-robin; Preliminary round	NYF	Not yet founded
