= Stephen Burton (darts player) =

English darts player (born 1987)

Personal information
- Nickname: Bertie
- Born: 2 December 1987 (age 38) Ipswich, Suffolk, England

Sport
- Sport: Darts
- Playing since: 2007
- Darts: 23g Mission
- Laterality: Right-handed
- Walk-on music: "Don't Stop Me Now" by Queen

Organisation (see split in darts)
- PDC: 2014–present (Tour Card: 2017–2018, 2023–)
- Current world ranking: (PDC) 103 ▲4 (29 October 2026)

PDC premier events – best performances
- World Championship: Last 96: 2019, 2025
- UK Open: Last 32: 2025
- PC Finals: Last 16: 2018

Other tournament wins
- Years
PDC Challenge Tour	2019 (x2), 2022

Stephen Burton (born 2 December 1987) is an English professional darts player who competes in Professional Darts Corporation (PDC) events. He won three events on the PDC Challenge Tour. His best major performance is reaching the last 16 at the 2018 Players Championship Finals.

== Career ==
=== 2017 ===
Burton first won his PDC Tour Card at 2017 Qualifying School (Q-School), securing a Tour Card for the next two years on Day One.

=== 2019 ===
Burton made his first appearance at the PDC World Darts Championship after earning one of three spots in the Tour Card Holder qualifier for the 2019 World Championship. In the first round, he was whitewashed by Ryan Searle 3–0 in sets.

After losing his tour card, he won two titles on the PDC Challenge Tour at Event Two and Event Eight in 2019.

=== 2023–present ===
In January 2023, he regained his PDC Tour Card via UK Q-School, finishing 3rd on the UK Order of Merit ranking.

Burton qualified for the 2025 PDC World Darts Championship through the Pro Tour Order of Merit. He lost to Alexander Merkx 3–0 in the first round.

== Personal life ==
Burton is a former pupil of Debenham High School. He is a self-employed window cleaner.

== World Championship results ==
=== PDC ===
- 2019: First round (lost to Ryan Searle 0–3)
- 2025: First round (lost to Alexander Merkx 0–3)
- 2026: First round (lost to Martin Schindler 1–3)

== Performance timeline ==
=== PDC ===
Tournament	2018	2019	2020	2023	2024	2025	2026
World Championship	DNQ	1R	Did not qualify			1R	1R
UK Open	DNQ		3R	2R	2R	5R	
Players Championship Finals	3R	DNQ		1R	2R	DNQ	
Career statistics
Year-end ranking	80	133	194	100	61	66	

==== European Tour ====
Season	1	2	3	4	5	6	7	8	9	10	11	12	13	14	15
2017	GDC; 1R	Did not qualify													
2018	EDO; DNP	GDG; DNP	GDO; DNQ	ADO; 1R	Did not qualify										
2023	DNQ		IDO; 1R	Did not qualify						EDM; 1R	GDO; 1R	DNQ			
2024	DNQ			EDG; 1R	DNQ				GDC; 2R	DNQ					
2026	DNQ			GDG; 1R	Did not qualify							CDO; 2R	FDT; 1R	SDT; DNQ	DDC; 1R

==== Players Championships ====
Season	1	2	3	4	5	6	7	8	9	10	11	12	13	14	15	16	17	18	19	20	21	22	23	24	25	26	27	28	29	30	31	32	33	34
2017	BAR; 3R	BAR; 1R	BAR; 1R	BAR; 1R	MIL; 1R	MIL; 2R	BAR; 1R	BAR; 1R	WIG; 2R	WIG; 2R	MIL; 1R	MIL; 1R	WIG; 2R	WIG; 1R	BAR; 2R	BAR; 1R	BAR; 1R	BAR; 1R	DUB; 2R	DUB; 1R	BAR; 1R	BAR; 1R												
2018	BAR; 3R	BAR; 1R	BAR; 3R	BAR; 1R	MIL; 4R	MIL; 1R	BAR; 2R	BAR; 1R	WIG; 4R	WIG; 1R	MIL; 3R	MIL; 1R	WIG; 2R	WIG; 1R	BAR; 4R	BAR; 2R	BAR; 2R	BAR; 1R	DUB; 1R	DUB; 1R	BAR; 4R	BAR; 3R												
2019 (Note: Not a Tour card holder)	WIG; 4R	WIG; 1R	WIG; 2R	WIG; 4R	BAR; 2R	BAR; 1R	WIG; 1R	WIG; 1R	BAR; 1R	BAR; 1R	BAR; 1R	BAR; 1R	BAR; 1R	BAR; 2R	BAR; 1R	BAR; 2R	WIG; 1R	WIG; 1R	BAR; 3R	BAR; 1R	HIL; DNP	HIL; DNP	BAR; 1R	BAR; 1R	BAR; 1R	BAR; 3R	DUB; 2R	DUB; 2R	BAR; 1R	BAR; 1R				
2020	Did not play																																	
2021	Did not play																																	
2022	BAR; 2R	BAR; QF	WIG; DNP	WIG; DNP	BAR; 1R	BAR; 1R	NIE; 1R	NIE; 3R	BAR; DNP	BAR; DNP	BAR; DNP	BAR; 1R	BAR; 1R	WIG; 3R	WIG; 1R	NIE; 1R	NIE; 2R	BAR; 1R	BAR; 1R	BAR; 1R	BAR; 1R	BAR; 2R	BAR; 1R	BAR; 1R	BAR; 2R	BAR; 2R	BAR; 1R	BAR; 1R	BAR; 1R	BAR; 1R				
2023	BAR; 1R	BAR; 2R	BAR; 2R	BAR; 3R	BAR; 1R	BAR; 1R	HIL; 2R	HIL; 1R	WIG; 1R	WIG; 1R	LEI; 1R	LEI; 1R	HIL; 3R	HIL; 4R	LEI; 1R	LEI; 2R	HIL; 4R	HIL; 2R	BAR; 2R	BAR; 1R	BAR; 1R	BAR; 1R	BAR; 4R	BAR; 3R	BAR; 4R	BAR; 3R	BAR; 1R	BAR; 1R	BAR; 4R	BAR; 1R				
2024	WIG; 2R	WIG; 2R	LEI; 1R	LEI; 3R	HIL; 2R	HIL; 1R	LEI; 1R	LEI; 3R	HIL; 3R	HIL; 2R	HIL; 4R	HIL; 3R	MIL; 2R	MIL; 3R	MIL; 1R	MIL; 1R	MIL; 3R	MIL; 4R	MIL; 3R	WIG; 2R	WIG; 1R	MIL; 1R	MIL; QF	WIG; 2R	WIG; 2R	WIG; 2R	WIG; 1R	WIG; 3R	LEI; 1R	LEI; 2R				
2025	WIG; 1R	WIG; 1R	ROS; 3R	ROS; 2R	LEI; 1R	LEI; 4R	HIL; 2R	HIL; 1R	LEI; 2R	LEI; 2R	LEI; 2R	LEI; 2R	ROS; 1R	ROS; 1R	HIL; 2R	HIL; 3R	LEI; 1R	LEI; 2R	LEI; 1R	LEI; 1R	LEI; 2R	HIL; 2R	HIL; 2R	MIL; 1R	MIL; 2R	HIL; 3R	HIL; 2R	LEI; 2R	LEI; 1R	LEI; 1R	WIG; 2R	WIG; 1R	WIG; 2R	WIG; 1R
2026	HIL; 3R	HIL; 2R	WIG; 1R	WIG; 2R	LEI; 1R	LEI; 1R	LEI; 1R	LEI; 2R	WIG; 1R	WIG; 2R	MIL; 1R	MIL; 1R	HIL; 1R	HIL; 1R	LEI; 1R	LEI; 2R	LEI; 3R	LEI; 1R	MIL; 2R	MIL; 2R	WIG; 1R	WIG; 2R	LEI; 2R	LEI; 2R	HIL; 1R	HIL; 1R	LEI; 1R	LEI; 1R	ROS; 1R	ROS; 1R	ROS; 2R	ROS; 4R	LEI; 1R	LEI; 1R

Performance Table Legend
W	Won the tournament	F	Finalist	SF	Semifinalist	QF	Quarterfinalist	#R; RR; L#	Lost in # round Round-robin; Last # stage	DQ	Disqualified
DNQ	Did not qualify	DNP	Did not participate	WD	Withdrew	NH	Tournament not held	#R; RR; L#	Lost in # round Round-robin; Last # stage	NYF	Not yet founded
