= Connor Scutt =

English darts player (born 1996)

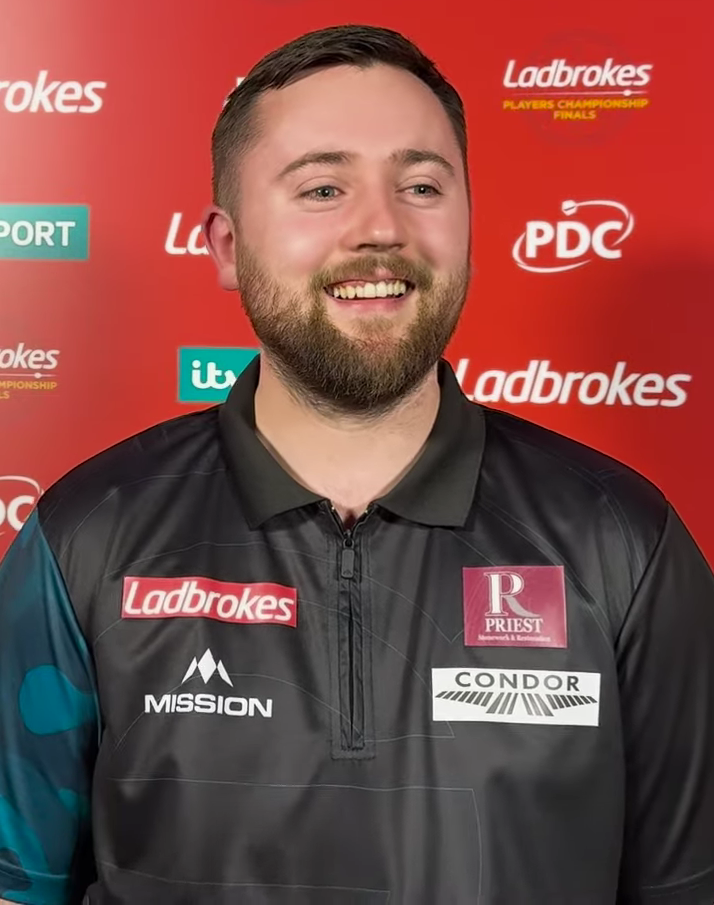
- Scutt at the 2024 Players Championship Finals

Personal information
- Nickname: "The Sniper"
- Born: 15 April 1996 (age 30) Carshalton, England
- Home town: Kenley, England

Sport
- Sport: Darts
- Playing since: 2014
- Darts: 22g Red Dragon
- Laterality: Right-handed
- Walk-on music: "Welcome to the Jungle" by Guns N' Roses

Organisation (see split in darts)
- PDC: 2022–present (Tour Card: 2022–2023; 2025–present)
- WDF: 2021, 2024
- Current world ranking: (PDC) 50 (5 November 2026)

WDF major events – best performances
- World Championship: Last 48: 2022
- World Masters: Semi-final: 2024

PDC premier events – best performances
- World Championship: Last 64: 2024, 2025, 2026
- UK Open: Last 32: 2025
- Grand Slam: Last 16: 2025
- PC Finals: Quarter-final: 2024
- Masters: Last 32: 2026

Other tournament wins
- Years
BDO/WDF Events (×4)
British Classic	2024
British Pentathlon (×2)	2024, 2025
Denmark Open	2024
PDC Challenge Tour (×2)
2024 (×2)

Connor Scutt (born 15 April 1996) is an English professional darts player who competes in Professional Darts Corporation (PDC) events. He is a PDC Tour Card holder, and previously held one from 2022 to 2023. He has finished as runner-up in two ranking PDC Players Championship events. He reached his first PDC major quarter-final at the 2024 Players Championship Finals. He won two titles on the 2024 PDC Challenge Tour and topped the Order of Merit ranking, which would have earned him a tour card. Scutt, however, was able to reach the top 64 of the Order of Merit by which he automatically earned his tour card.

Scutt previously competed in World Darts Federation (WDF) events, where he won three titles, and reached the semi-finals of the 2024 World Masters.

== Career ==
=== 2022 ===
At 2022 Q-School Scutt won a two-year PDC Tour Card by finishing third on the UK Q-School Order of Merit.

Scutt qualified for the 2022 WDF World Darts Championship, which he was allowed to play after getting special dispensation from the PDC, but he would lose in the first round to Shawn Burt 2–0 in sets.

In the 2022 PDC Players Championship series Scutt reached the semi-finals at Players Championship 3, losing there to Joe Cullen 7–5. At Players Championship 30 Scutt reached the quarter-finals, losing there to Martin Schindler 6–5.

=== 2023 ===
Scutt reached the semi-finals at 2023's Players Championship 13, losing there to Michael Smith 7–3 and the final at Players Championship 27, losing to Radek Szagański 8–5. As a result Scutt qualified for the 2023 Players Championship Finals, making his debut as the 37th seed, where he lost to the 28th seed, eventual semi-finalist Gabriel Clemens, in the first round.

=== 2024 ===
==== PDC – top of the Challenge Tour ====
Despite his final at PC27, Scutt lost his Tour card after the 2024 PDC World Championship after he lost 3–0 to Gerwyn Price in the event's second round. Scutt was ranked sixty-ninth on the Order of Merit after the World Championship, therefore outside the top 64 which he needed to be in to keep his card.

Scutt failed to re-gain his tour card at 2024's UK Qualifying School (Q-School), finishing seventeenth on the UK Q-School Order of Merit, outside of the top ten required to win a card.

Scutt competed the secondary tier of the 2024 PDC Pro Tour, the 2024 PDC Challenge Tour (CT), winning two titles and topping the Order of Merit ranking. He won event thirteen, whitewashing Dragutin Horvat 5–0 in the final and event seventeen, beating Tom Sykes 5–3 in the final. Scutt finished as runner-up at event twenty, being defeated by Christian Kist 5–2 in the final. He secured his place as the Challenge Tour Order of Merit winner by reaching the final at Challenge Tour 23, losing to Andreas Harrysson 5–3 but earning a place at the 2024 Grand Slam of Darts and guaranteeing himself a place at the 2025 PDC World Championship.

At the Grand Slam Scutt made his debut and was drawn in Group D. He whitewashed number 5 seed Dave Chisnall 5–0 in his opening game but then lost to Ritchie Edhouse 5–2 and was whitewashed by Ross Smith. He was eliminated after finishishing third in his group.

Scutt received call-ups for 2024 PDC Players Championship events filling in as a reserve for an absent tour card holder virtue of his ranking on the Challenge Tour Order of Merit. He reached the quarter-finals at Players Championship 6 (PC6), where he was whitewashed by Daryl Gurney 6–0, and PC16, where he lost to Ricky Evans 6–5 in a deciding leg. Scutt reached the final at PC22, losing to Gary Anderson 8–4. At PC25 Scutt reached another quarter-final, losing to Stephen Bunting 6–4.

As a result of his performances in Players Championship events Scutt qualified for the 2024 Players Championship Finals as 34th seed. This meant that he played 31st seed Martin Lukeman in the first round, who he defeated 6–4. Scutt then defeated Mario Vandenbogaerde 6–3 and Daryl Gurney 10–3 to reach his first PDC major quarter-final. He then lost to Dirk van Duijvenbode 10–9 in a deciding leg.

==== WDF career ====
As he failed to regain his Tour Card status at Q-School, Scutt returned to playing World Darts Federation events.

Scutt won the 2024 British Classic, defeating Josh Clough 5–2 in the final.

At the 2024 WDF World Masters Scutt reached the semi-final, losing there to Kai Gotthardt 6–5 in a deciding leg.

=== 2025 ===
In March 2025, Scutt signed for Red Dragon Darts.

== World Championship results ==
=== WDF World Championship ===
- 2022: First round (lost to Shawn Burt 0–2) (sets)

=== PDC World Championship ===
- 2024: Second round (lost to Gerwyn Price 0–3)
- 2025: Second round (lost to Damon Heta 1–3)
- 2026: Second round (lost to Gary Anderson 1–3)

== Performance timeline ==
=== WDF ===
Tournament	2022	2024
WDF Major/platinum events
World Championship	1R	PDC
World Masters	DNP	SF

=== PDC ===
Tournament	2019	2022	2023	2024	2025	2026
PDC Ranked televised events
World Championship	Did not qualify			2R	2R	2R
World Masters	Did not qualify					1R
UK Open	DNQ	3R	3R	1R	5R	4R
Grand Slam	DNQ			RR	2R	DNQ
Players Championship Finals	DNQ		1R	QF	DNQ	
PDC Non-ranked events
World Youth Championship	RR	Did not participate				
Career statistics
Season-end ranking (PDC)	NR	107	69	62	49	

==== European Tour ====
Season	1	2	3	4	5	6	7	8	9	10	11	12	13	14	15
2022	DNQ				EDO; 1R	DNQ		DDC; 1R	DNQ		GDO; 1R	DNQ			
2023	Did not qualify									EDM; 1R	GDO; 1R	DNQ			
2025	BDO; DNQ	EDT; 1R	DNQ			EDG; 2R	Did not qualify						SDT; 1R	GDC; DNQ	
2026	PDO; 2R	Did not qualify					IDO; 2R	Did not qualify			HDT; 1R	CDO; 1R	Did not qualify		

==== Players Championships ====
Season	1	2	3	4	5	6	7	8	9	10	11	12	13	14	15	16	17	18	19	20	21	22	23	24	25	26	27	28	29	30	31	32	33	34
2020 (Note: Not a Tour card holder)	Did not participate							BAR; 2R	Did not participate																									
2022	BAR; 1R	BAR; 3R	WIG; SF	WIG; 2R	BAR; 2R	BAR; 1R	NIE; 2R	NIE; 1R	BAR; 2R	BAR; 1R	BAR; DNP	BAR; 1R	BAR; 1R	WIG; 1R	WIG; 1R	NIE; 1R	NIE; 2R	BAR; 1R	BAR; 1R	BAR; 1R	BAR; 2R	BAR; 2R	BAR; 1R	BAR; 1R	BAR; 1R	BAR; 2R	BAR; 1R	BAR; 1R	BAR; 3R	BAR; QF				
2023	BAR; 2R	BAR; 2R	BAR; 2R	BAR; 1R	BAR; 1R	BAR; 2R	HIL; 2R	HIL; 1R	WIG; 4R	WIG; 2R	LEI; 1R	LEI; 1R	HIL; SF	HIL; 1R	LEI; 2R	LEI; 4R	HIL; 4R	HIL; 2R	BAR; 3R	BAR; 1R	BAR; 1R	BAR; 1R	BAR; 1R	BAR; 2R	BAR; 2R	BAR; 1R	BAR; F	BAR; 2R	BAR; 3R	BAR; 1R				
2024	WIG; DNP		LEI; 1R	LEI; DNP	HIL; 2R	HIL; QF	DNP				HIL; 1R	HIL; 2R	MIL; 2R	MIL; 2R	MIL; 2R	MIL; QF	MIL; 1R	MIL; 2R	MIL; 2R	WIG; 2R	WIG; 2R	LEI; F	LEI; 1R	WIG; 2R	WIG; QF	WIG; 3R	WIG; 1R	WIG; 1R	LEI; 3R	LEI; 1R				
2025	WIG; 1R	WIG; 1R	ROS; 3R	ROS; 1R	LEI; 1R	LEI; 3R	HIL; 1R	HIL; 1R	LEI; 1R	LEI; 4R	LEI; 2R	LEI; 2R	ROS; 2R	ROS; 1R	HIL; 1R	HIL; 2R	LEI; 1R	LEI; 1R	LEI; 2R	LEI; 1R	LEI; 2R	HIL; 2R	HIL; 1R	MIL; 2R	MIL; 2R	HIL; 1R	HIL; 1R	LEI; 2R	LEI; 3R	LEI; 3R	WIG; 2R	WIG; 1R	WIG; 1R	WIG; 2R
2026	HIL; 3R	HIL; 1R	WIG; 1R	WIG; 1R	LEI; 3R	LEI; 1R	LEI; 3R	LEI; 2R	WIG; SF	WIG; 1R	MIL; 2R	MIL; 1R	HIL; 3R	HIL; 3R	LEI; 1R	LEI; 3R	LEI; 2R	LEI; 2R	MIL; 3R	MIL; 2R	WIG; 1R	WIG; 3R	LEI; 1R	LEI; 4R	HIL; 1R	HIL; 2R	LEI; 1R	LEI; 2R	ROS; 2R	ROS; 1R	ROS; 1R	ROS; 3R	LEI; 2R	LEI; 2R

Performance Table Legend
W	Won the tournament	F	Finalist	SF	Semifinalist	QF	Quarterfinalist	#R; RR; Prel.	Lost in # round Round-robin; Preliminary round	DQ	Disqualified
DNQ	Did not qualify	DNP	Did not participate	WD	Withdrew	NH	Tournament not held	#R; RR; Prel.	Lost in # round Round-robin; Preliminary round	NYF	Not yet founded
