= 2024 Players Championship Finals =

2024 Ladbrokes Players Championship Finals

Tournament information
- Dates: 22–24 November 2024
- Venue: Butlin's Minehead
- Location: Minehead, England
- Organisation(s): Professional Darts Corporation (PDC)
- Format: Legs
- Prize fund: £600,000
- Winner's share: £120,000
- High checkout: 170; Ian White; Scott Williams; Luke Littler

Champion(s)
- Luke Humphries (ENG)

The 2024 Players Championship Finals (known for sponsorship reasons as the 2024 Ladbrokes Players Championship Finals) was the seventeenth staging of the Professional Darts Corporation (PDC) darts tournament, which saw the top 64 players from the 2024 PDC Players Championship series taking part. The tournament took place from 22 to 24 November 2024 at the Butlin's Resort, Minehead.

Luke Humphries was the defending champion after defeating Michael van Gerwen 11–9 in the 2023 final and successfully defended his title to win the tournament for a second time, with an 11–7 victory over Luke Littler in the final.

== Prize money ==
The 2024 Players Championship Finals had a prize fund of £600,000.

The following was the breakdown of the fund:

Position (no. of players)		Prize money (Total: £600,000)
Winner	(1)	£120,000
Runner-Up	(1)	£60,000
Semi-finalists	(2)	£30,000
Quarter-finalists	(4)	£20,000
Last 16 (third round)	(8)	£10,000
Last 32 (second round)	(16)	£6,500
Last 64 (first round)	(32)	£3,000

== Qualification ==
The top 64 players from the Players Championships Order of Merit qualified, which was solely based on prize money won in the 30 Players Championship events during the season.

On 22 November 2024, the opening day of the tournament, forty-seventh seed Dom Taylor received a ban from the Professional Darts Corporation following the failure of a drugs test. Nick Kenny came directly into the draw to replace him.

The following players qualified:

Click on the seed number of a player to go to their draw section.

=== Top 64 in the Players Championship Order of Merit ===
1. Chris Dobey (first round)
2. Stephen Bunting (first round)
3. Damon Heta (third round)
4. Ryan Searle (first round)
5. Dave Chisnall (second round)
6. Gary Anderson (first round)
7. Josh Rock (second round)
8. Luke Littler (runner-up)
9. Danny Noppert (third round)
10. Jonny Clayton (first round)
11. Cameron Menzies (second round)
12. Ross Smith (semi-finals)
13. Wessel Nijman (first round)
14. Raymond van Barneveld (second round)
15. Daryl Gurney (third round)
16. Mike De Decker (quarter-finals)
17. Michael van Gerwen (first round)
18. Michael Smith (second round)
19. Luke Humphries (champion)
20. Gian van Veen (first round)
21. Wesley Plaisier (second round)
22. Ryan Joyce (quarter-finals)
23. Dirk van Duijvenbode (semi-finals)
24. James Wade (first round)
25. Ritchie Edhouse (second round)
26. Alan Soutar (first round)
27. Brendan Dolan (first round)
28. Andrew Gilding (third round)
29. Gerwyn Price (first round)
30. Krzysztof Ratajski (second round)
31. Martin Lukeman (first round)
32. William O'Connor (first round)
33. Niels Zonneveld (third round)
34. Connor Scutt (quarter-finals)
35. Madars Razma (first round)
36. Thibault Tricole (second round)
37. Kevin Doets (first round)
38. Martin Schindler (third round)
39. Jermaine Wattimena (third round)
40. Luke Woodhouse (first round)
41. Stephen Burton (second round)
42. Callan Rydz (first round)
43. Karel Sedláček (first round)
44. Mensur Suljović (first round)
45. Scott Williams (quarter-finals)
46. Gabriel Clemens (first round)
47. ~~Dom Taylor~~
48. Ian White (second round)
49. Richard Veenstra (first round)
50. Peter Wright (first round)
51. Chris Landman (first round)
52. Kim Huybrechts (second round)
53. Dimitri Van den Bergh (first round)
54. Jim Williams (first round)
55. Florian Hempel (second round)
56. James Hurrell (first round)
57. Rob Cross (first round)
58. Ricky Evans (first round)
59. Ryan Meikle (second round)
60. Joe Cullen (first round)
61. Jeffrey de Graaf (third round)
62. Mervyn King (first round)
63. Mario Vandenbogaerde (second round)
64. Nathan Aspinall (second round)
65. Nick Kenny (first round)

== Results ==
There was no draw held, all players were put in a fixed bracket by their seeding positions.

Numbers to the left of player names indicate the player’s ranking on the Players Championship Order of Merit.

=== Finals ===
Quarter-finals (best of 19 legs); 24 November
16	Mike De Decker 97.40	3
8	Luke Littler 103.73	10
45	Scott Williams 96.99	3
12	Ross Smith 105.26	10
34	Connor Scutt 98.75	9
23	Dirk van Duijvenbode 96.69	10
19	Luke Humphries 95.50	10
22	Ryan Joyce 91.10	5

Semi-finals (best of 21 legs); 24 November
8	Luke Littler 104.38	11
12	Ross Smith 94.39	9
23	Dirk van Duijvenbode 92.76	8
19	Luke Humphries 92.92	11

Final (best of 21 legs); 24 November
8	Luke Littler 100.08	7
19	Luke Humphries 103.69	11

=== Top half ===
==== Section 1 ====
First round (best of 11 legs); 22 November
1	Chris Dobey 86.08	1
64	Nathan Aspinall 91.63	6
32	William O'Connor 88.83	3
33	Niels Zonneveld 97.57	6
16	Mike De Decker 93.00	6
49	Richard Veenstra 90.42	1
17	Michael van Gerwen 91.41	1
48	Ian White 102.68	6
8	Luke Littler 112.73	6
57	Rob Cross 100.54	0
25	Ritchie Edhouse 95.79	6
40	Luke Woodhouse 94.89	5
9	Danny Noppert 95.90	6
56	James Hurrell 97.84	5
24	James Wade 87.68	4
41	Stephen Burton 87.52	6

Second round (best of 11 legs); 23 November
64	Nathan Aspinall 95.79	3
33	Niels Zonneveld 97.27	6
16	Mike De Decker 101.33	6
48	Ian White 76.13	0
8	Luke Littler 105.33	6
25	Ritchie Edhouse 105.35	2
9	Danny Noppert 93.35	6
41	Stephen Burton 80.79	4

Third round (best of 19 legs); 23 November
33	Niels Zonneveld 91.93	4
16	Mike De Decker 95.29	10
8	Luke Littler 104.70	10
9	Danny Noppert 88.92	3

Quarter-finals (best of 19 legs); 24 November
16	Mike De Decker 97.40	3
8	Luke Littler 103.73	10

==== Section 2 ====
First round (best of 11 legs); 22 November
4	Ryan Searle 93.52	5
61	Jeffrey de Graaf 95.07	6
29	Gerwyn Price 94.64	4
36	Thibault Tricole 95.20	6
13	Wessel Nijman 90.14	1
52	Kim Huybrechts 96.87	6
20	Gian van Veen 104.21	5
45	Scott Williams 97.64	6
5	Dave Chisnall 96.26	6
60	Joe Cullen 86.17	1
28	Andrew Gilding 97.14	6
37	Kevin Doets 94.16	3
12	Ross Smith 104.73	6
53	Dimitri Van den Bergh 87.10	1
21	Wesley Plaisier 95.00	6
44	Mensur Suljović 93.89	4

Second round (best of 11 legs); 23 November
61	Jeffrey de Graaf 87.92	6
36	Thibault Tricole 89.02	3
52	Kim Huybrechts 88.86	4
45	Scott Williams 87.11	6
5	Dave Chisnall 90.95	5
28	Andrew Gilding 100.07	6
12	Ross Smith 89.90	6
21	Wesley Plaisier 80.08	1

Third round (best of 19 legs); 23 November
61	Jeffrey de Graaf 96.40	8
45	Scott Williams 101.08	10
28	Andrew Gilding 81.43	1
12	Ross Smith 92.42	10

Quarter-finals (best of 19 legs); 24 November
45	Scott Williams 96.99	3
12	Ross Smith 105.26	10

=== Bottom half ===
==== Section 3 ====
First round (best of 11 legs); 22 November
2	Stephen Bunting 94.72	2
63	Mario Vandenbogaerde 95.62	6
31	Martin Lukeman 92.51	4
34	Connor Scutt 98.98	6
15	Daryl Gurney 108.81	6
50	Peter Wright 88.66	1
18	Michael Smith 94.26	6
Alt/65	Nick Kenny 96.06	5
7	Josh Rock 96.31	6
58	Ricky Evans 88.88	1
26	Alan Soutar 89.33	4
39	Jermaine Wattimena 91.29	6
10	Jonny Clayton 89.96	3
55	Florian Hempel 92.91	6
23	Dirk van Duijvenbode 99.40	6
42	Callan Rydz 93.33	1

Second round (best of 11 legs); 23 November
63	Mario Vandenbogaerde 88.76	3
34	Connor Scutt 91.60	6
15	Daryl Gurney 86.10	6
18	Michael Smith 92.76	4
7	Josh Rock 97.15	0
39	Jermaine Wattimena 102.48	6
55	Florian Hempel 87.74	3
23	Dirk van Duijvenbode 89.64	6

Third round (best of 19 legs); 23 November
34	Connor Scutt 95.19	10
15	Daryl Gurney 86.16	3
39	Jermaine Wattimena 90.85	5
23	Dirk van Duijvenbode 99.51	10

Quarter-finals (best of 19 legs); 24 November
34	Connor Scutt 98.75	9
23	Dirk van Duijvenbode 96.69	10

==== Section 4 ====
First round (best of 11 legs); 22 November
3	Damon Heta 92.87	6
62	Mervyn King 80.56	1
30	Krzysztof Ratajski 96.16	6
35	Madars Razma 93.77	4
14	Raymond van Barneveld 98.06	6
51	Chris Landman 91.20	2
19	Luke Humphries 95.34	6
46	Gabriel Clemens 93.77	2
6	Gary Anderson 103.88	5
59	Ryan Meikle 94.43	6
27	Brendan Dolan 78.46	2
38	Martin Schindler 83.91	6
11	Cameron Menzies 94.77	6
54	Jim Williams 83.03	2
22	Ryan Joyce 91.39	6
43	Karel Sedláček 87.06	4

Second round (best of 11 legs); 23 November
3	Damon Heta 97.36	6
30	Krzysztof Ratajski 97.86	5
14	Raymond van Barneveld 89.69	3
19	Luke Humphries 102.35	6
59	Ryan Meikle 95.67	4
38	Martin Schindler 98.96	6
11	Cameron Menzies 87.98	5
22	Ryan Joyce 91.92	6

Third round (best of 19 legs); 23 November
3	Damon Heta 92.38	6
19	Luke Humphries 96.98	10
38	Martin Schindler 87.59	6
22	Ryan Joyce 97.12	10

Quarter-finals (best of 19 legs); 24 November
19	Luke Humphries 95.50	10
22	Ryan Joyce 91.10	5

== Top averages ==
The table lists all players who achieved an average of at least 100 in a match. If one player has multiple records, this is indicated by the number in brackets.

#	Player	Round	Average	Result
1	Luke Littler	First Round	112.73	Won
2	Daryl Gurney	First Round	108.81	Won
3	Ritchie Edhouse	Second Round	105.35	Lost
4	Luke Littler (2)	Second Round	105.33	Won
5	Ross Smith	Quarter Finals	105.26	Won
6	Ross Smith (2)	First Round	104.73	Won
7	Luke Littler (3)	Third Round	104.70	Won
8	Luke Littler (4)	Semi Finals	104.38	Won
9	Gian van Veen	First Round	104.21	Lost
10	Gary Anderson	First Round	103.88	Lost
11	Luke Littler (5)	Quarter Finals	103.73	Won
12	Luke Humphries	Final	103.69	Won
13	Ian White	First Round	102.69	Won
14	Jermaine Wattimena	Second Round	102.48	Won
15	Luke Humphries (2)	Second Round	102.35	Won
16	Mike De Decker	Second Round	101.33	Won
17	Scott Williams	Third Round	101.08	Won
18	Rob Cross	First Round	100.54	Lost
19	Luke Littler (6)	Final	100.08	Lost
20	Andrew Gilding	Second Round	100.07	Won
