= 2023 Belgian Darts Open =

2023 Blåkläder Belgian Darts Open

Tournament information
- Dates: 5–7 May 2023
- Venue: Oktoberhallen
- Location: Wieze, Belgium
- Organisation(s): Professional Darts Corporation (PDC)
- Format: Legs
- Prize fund: £175,000
- Winner's share: £30,000
- High checkout: 167; Matt Campbell

Champion(s)
- Michael van Gerwen

The 2023 Belgian Darts Open, known as the 2023 Blåkläder Belgian Darts Open for sponsorship reasons, was a professional darts tournament that took place at the Oktoberhallen in Wieze, Belgium from 5–7 May 2023. It was the seventh of thirteen European Tour events on the 2023 PDC Pro Tour. It featured a field of 48 players and £175,000 in prize money, with £30,000 going to the winner.

Dave Chisnall was the defending champion, defeating Andrew Gilding 8–6 in the 2022 final, but he was defeated 6–4 to Josh Rock in the third round.

Michael van Gerwen won his first European Tour title of 2023 by defeating Luke Humphries 8–6 in the final.

== Prize money ==
The prize money was increased for the first time in 4 years for all European Tours:

Stage (num. of players)		Prize money
Winner	(1)	£30,000
Runner-up	(1)	£12,000
Semi-finalists	(2)	£8,500
Quarter-finalists	(4)	£6,000
Third round losers	(8)	£4,000
Second round losers	(16)	£2,500*
First round losers	(16)	£1,250
Total	£175,000	

- Seeded players who lost in the second round of the event were not credited with prize money on any Order of Merit. A player who qualified as a qualifier, but later became a seed due to the withdrawal of one or more other players was credited with their prize money on all Orders of Merit regardless of how far they progressed in the event.

== Qualification and format ==
The top 16 entrants from the PDC Pro Tour Order of Merit on 9 March 2023 automatically qualified for the event and were seeded into the second round.

The remaining 32 places went to players from six qualifying events – 24 from the Tour Card Holder Qualifier (held on 21 March), two from the Associate Member Qualifier, the two highest-ranked Belgians automatically qualified, alongside two from the Host Nation Qualifier, one from the Nordic & Baltic Associate Member Qualifier, and one from the East European Associate Member Qualifier.

On 4 May, it was announced that Cameron Menzies had withdrawn due to injury, and was replaced by Gabriel Clemens, who was top of the Reserve List Qualifiers.

The following players took part in the tournament:

Top 16

1. Luke Humphries (runner-up)
2. Dave Chisnall (third round)
3. Michael van Gerwen (champion)
4. Damon Heta (third round)
5. Dirk van Duijvenbode (semi-finals)
6. Rob Cross (third round)
7. Michael Smith (quarter-finals)
8. Nathan Aspinall (quarter-finals)
9. Danny Noppert (third round)
10. Peter Wright (second round)
11. Ryan Searle (second round)
12. Joe Cullen (second round)
13. Jonny Clayton (quarter-finals)
14. Martin Schindler (third round)
15. Josh Rock (semi-finals)
16. Andrew Gilding (second round)

Tour Card Qualifier
- Krzysztof Ratajski (first round)
- Bradley Brooks (second round)
- José de Sousa (second round)
- Jeff Smith (first round)
- Daryl Gurney (second round)
- Ricky Evans (second round)
- Jermaine Wattimena (first round)
- Ross Smith (first round)
- Gary Anderson (quarter-finals)
- Robert Owen (first round)
- Dylan Slevin (first round)
- Graham Usher (first round)
- Richard Veenstra (first round)
- James Wade (first round)
- Keane Barry (second round)
- Ian White (first round)
- Damian Mol (second round)
- Callan Rydz (first round)
- Raymond van Barneveld (second round)
- Chris Dobey (second round)
- Matt Campbell (third round)
- Martijn Kleermaker (second round)
- Ted Evetts (second round)

Associate Member Qualifier
- Stefan Bellmont (second round)
- Sven Hilling (first round)

Highest ranking Belgians
- Dimitri Van den Bergh (second round)
- Kim Huybrechts (first round)

Host Nation Qualifier
- François Schweyen (first round)
- Andy Baetens (third round)

Nordic & Baltic Qualifier
- Dennis Nilsson (first round)

East European Qualifier
- Dalibor Šmolík (first round)

Reserve List Qualifier
- Gabriel Clemens (third round)

== Draw ==
The draw was confirmed on 4 May.

First round (best of 11 legs); 21 April
Bradley Brooks 95.18	6
Richard Veenstra 93.11	3
Jermaine Wattimena 93.90	3
Andy Baetens 92.88	6
Martijn Kleermaker 85.95	6
Ross Smith 91.25	4
Dennis Nilsson 83.11	2
Ted Evetts 92.13	6
Jeff Smith 86.52	5
Damian Mol 88.75	6
Sven Hilling 75.72	1
Keane Barry 88.11	6
James Wade 88.33	3
Raymond van Barneveld 90.61	6
Callan Rydz 86.61	3
Matt Campbell 92.85	6
Kim Huybrechts 87.86	0
Ricky Evans 99.10	6
Dalibor Šmolík 80.34	3
Chris Dobey 89.18	6
Dimitri Van den Bergh 94.54	6
Ian White 95.79	1
Alt	Gabriel Clemens 95.94	6
Graham Usher 93.34	0
François Schweyen 82.31	3
José de Sousa 90.55	6
Daryl Gurney 94.73	6
Dylan Slevin 90.96	3
Robert Owen 83.35	4
Stefan Bellmont 91.88	6
Gary Anderson 98.41	6
Krzysztof Ratajski 86.69	1

Second round (best of 11 legs); 22 April
1	Luke Humphries 100.96	6
Bradley Brooks 98.23	5
16	Andrew Gilding 94.50	2
Andy Baetens 98.85	6
8	Nathan Aspinall 100.82	6
Martijn Kleermaker 92.00	1
9	Danny Noppert 95.32	6
Ted Evetts 91.47	4
4	Damon Heta 88.35	6
Damian Mol 83.78	3
13	Jonny Clayton 100.05	6
Keane Barry 94.64	3
5	Dirk van Duijvenbode 91.63	6
Raymond van Barneveld 91.76	3
12	Joe Cullen 94.32	3
Matt Campbell 103.49	6
2	Dave Chisnall 100.01	6
Ricky Evans 92.50	2
15	Josh Rock 107.11	6
Chris Dobey 104.39	2
7	Michael Smith 102.03	6
Dimitri Van den Bergh 94.68	2
10	Peter Wright 95.83	5
Alt	Gabriel Clemens 103.27	6
3	Michael van Gerwen 100.61	6
José de Sousa 90.95	5
14	Martin Schindler 90.83	6
Daryl Gurney 88.68	1
6	Rob Cross 90.64	6
Stefan Bellmont 89.90	4
11	Ryan Searle 98.06	2
Gary Anderson 104.86	6

Third round (best of 11 legs); 23 April
1	Humphries 99.06	6
Baetens 102.35	5
8	Aspinall 91.57	6
9	Noppert 94.85	4
4	Heta 99.35	3
13	Clayton 100.72	6
5	van Duijvenbode 93.40	6
Campbell 88.18	3
2	Chisnall 93.56	4
15	Rock 103.64	6
7	Smith 93.34	6
Alt	Clemens 96.20	4
3	van Gerwen 97.06	6
14	Schindler 94.30	5
6	Cross 85.27	2
Anderson 94.08	6

Quarter-finals (best of 11 legs); 23 April
1	Humphries 96.73	6
8	Aspinall 93.42	2
13	Clayton 99.98	4
5	van Duijvenbode 93.64	6
15	Rock 95.83	6
7	Smith 93.26	1
3	van Gerwen 101.02	6
Anderson 81.84	1

Semi-finals (best of 13 legs); 23 April
1	Humphries 90.23	7
5	van Duijvenbode 84.88	6
15	Rock 95.32	3
3	van Gerwen 102.98	7

Final (best of 15 legs); 23 April
1	Humphries 101.03	6
3	van Gerwen 99.69	8
