= 2024 German Darts Championship =

2024 NEO.bet German Darts Championship

Tournament information
- Dates: 30 August–1 September 2024
- Venue: Halle 39
- Location: Hildesheim, Germany
- Organisation(s): Professional Darts Corporation (PDC)
- Format: Legs
- Prize fund: £175,000
- Winner's share: £30,000
- High checkout: 167 Martin Schindler

Champion(s)
- Peter Wright

The 2024 German Darts Championship (known for sponshorship reasons as the 2024 NEO.bet German Darts Championship) was the ninth of thirteen PDC European Tour events on the 2024 PDC Pro Tour. The tournament took place at the Halle 39, Hildesheim, Germany from 30 August to 1 September 2024. It featured a field of 48 players and £175,000 in prize money, with £30,000 going to the winner.

Ricardo Pietreczko was the defending champion after defeating Peter Wright 8–4 in the 2023 final. Pietreczko lost 6–5 to Nick Kenny in the third round.

Peter Wright won his first title of 2024, beating Luke Littler 8–5 in the final.

== Prize money ==
The prize fund remained at £175,000, with £30,000 to the winner:

Stage (num. of players)		Prize money
Winner	(1)	£30,000
Runner-up	(1)	£12,000
Semi-finalists	(2)	£8,500
Quarter-finalists	(4)	£6,000
Third round losers	(8)	£4,000
Second round losers	(16)	£2,500*
First round losers	(16)	£1,250*
Total	£175,000	

- Pre-qualified players from the Orders of Merit who lose in their first match of the event shall not be credited with prize money on any Order of Merit. A player who qualifies as a qualifier, but later becomes a seed due to the withdrawal of one or more other players shall be credited with their prize money on all Orders of Merit regardless of how far they progress in the event.

== Qualification and format ==
A massive overhaul in the qualification for the 2024 European Tour events was announced on 7 January.

For the first time, both the PDC Order of Merit and the PDC Pro Tour Order of Merit rankings were used to determine 32 of the 48 entrants for the event.

The top 16 on the PDC Order of Merit qualified, along with the highest 16 ranked players on the PDC ProTour Order of Merit (after the PDC Order of Merit players were removed). From those 32 players, the 16 highest ranked players on the PDC ProTour Order of Merit were seeded for the event.

The seedings were confirmed on 7 June.

The remaining 16 places went to players from four qualifying events – 10 from the Tour Card Holder Qualifier (held on 13 June), four from the Host Nation Qualifier (held on 19 May), one from the Nordic & Baltic Associate Member Qualifier (held on 31 May), and one from the East European Associate Member Qualifier (held on 31 May).

Gary Anderson, Josh Rock, Michael Smith and Nathan Aspinall withdrew and were replaced by Stephen Burton, Dylan Slevin, Mensur Suljović and Robert Owen. Ryan Joyce, Daryl Gurney and Joe Cullen moved up to become seeds.

The following players took part in the tournament:

Seeded Players

1. Dave Chisnall (semi-finals)
2. Gerwyn Price (second round)
3. Damon Heta (quarter-finals)
4. Danny Noppert (third round)
5. Stephen Bunting (second round)
6. Ryan Searle (third round)
7. Ross Smith (second round)
8. Martin Schindler (quarter-finals)
9. Chris Dobey (third round)
10. Ricardo Pietreczko (third round)
11. Luke Littler (runner-up)
12. Gian van Veen (third round)
13. Michael van Gerwen (quarter-finals)
14. Ryan Joyce (second round)
15. Daryl Gurney (semi-finals)
16. Joe Cullen (third round)

Order of Merit Qualifiers
- Brendan Dolan (first round)
- Luke Woodhouse (first round)
- Jonny Clayton (second round)
- Raymond van Barneveld (first round)
- Krzysztof Ratajski (third round)
- James Wade (second round)
- Ritchie Edhouse (second round)
- Andrew Gilding (third round)
- Peter Wright (champion)
- Dimitri Van den Bergh (first round)
- Dirk van Duijvenbode (second round)
- Callan Rydz (first round)

Tour Card Qualifier
- Martin Lukeman (first round)
- José de Sousa (first round)
- Mickey Mansell (second round)
- Dom Taylor (second round)
- Simon Whitlock (second round)
- Nick Kenny (quarter-finals)
- Boris Krčmar (first round)
- Maik Kuivenhoven (first round)
- Jelle Klaasen (first round)
- Steve Beaton (first round)

Host Nation Qualifier
- Niko Springer (first round)
- Max Hopp (second round)
- Dragutin Horvat (first round)
- Matthias Ehlers (first round)

Nordic and Baltic Qualifier
- Johan Engström (first round)

East European Qualifier
- Krzysztof Kciuk (first round)

Reserve List
- Stephen Burton (second round)
- Dylan Slevin (second round)
- Mensur Suljović (second round)
- Robert Owen (second round)

== Draw ==
First round (best of 11 legs); 30 August
Raymond van Barneveld 89.55	2
Dom Taylor 96.03	6
José de Sousa 83.82	2
Max Hopp 86.67	6
Alt	Mensur Suljović 102.43	6
Dimitri Van den Bergh 99.87	2
Mickey Mansell 83.37	6
Matthias Ehlers 80.02	2
Brendan Dolan 81.25	2
Dirk van Duijvenbode 96.30	6
Maik Kuivenhoven 84.70	3
James Wade 91.73	6
Peter Wright 95.15	6
Niko Springer 95.70	4
Krzysztof Kciuk 86.35	3
Alt	Robert Owen 102.12	6
Dragutin Horvat 86.60	3
Krzysztof Ratajski 93.68	6
Boris Krčmar 83.85	4
Alt	Stephen Burton 91.13	6
Nick Kenny 91.94	6
Jelle Klaasen 82.99	3
Callan Rydz 85.66	4
Simon Whitlock 92.66	6
Ritchie Edhouse 87.99	6
Luke Woodhouse 88.02	5
Johan Engström 87.72	4
Andrew Gilding 93.00	6
Martin Lukeman 90.04	5
Jonny Clayton 90.78	6
Alt	Dylan Slevin 89.63	6
Steve Beaton 93.87	4

Second round (best of 11 legs); 31 August
1	Dave Chisnall 95.85	6
Dom Taylor 87.07	3
16	Joe Cullen 85.48	6
Max Hopp 84.04	4
8	Martin Schindler 92.38	6
Alt	Mensur Suljović 89.17	4
9	Chris Dobey 110.64	6
Mickey Mansell 98.65	2
4	Danny Noppert 94.26	6
Dirk van Duijvenbode 91.12	4
13	Michael van Gerwen 96.89	6
James Wade 90.80	2
5	Stephen Bunting 103.20	5
Peter Wright 95.03	6
12	Gian van Veen 102.65	6
Alt	Robert Owen 93.68	3
2	Gerwyn Price 88.87	5
Krzysztof Ratajski 89.23	6
15	Daryl Gurney 92.87	6
Alt	Stephen Burton 83.81	1
7	Ross Smith 91.09	5
Nick Kenny 84.04	6
10	Ricardo Pietreczko 91.74	6
Simon Whitlock 86.22	3
3	Damon Heta 93.62	6
Ritchie Edhouse 91.60	2
14	Ryan Joyce 90.84	3
Andrew Gilding 92.22	6
6	Ryan Searle 96.66	6
Jonny Clayton 92.07	4
11	Luke Littler 101.33	6
Alt	Dylan Slevin 86.07	0

Third round (best of 11 legs); 1 September
1	Chisnall 96.97	6
16	Cullen 79.50	0
8	Schindler 95.19	6
9	Dobey 95.61	4
4	Noppert 88.71	2
13	van Gerwen 102.08	6
Wright 93.50	6
12	van Veen 89.80	4
Ratajski 90.88	2
15	Gurney 101.33	6
Kenny 87.80	6
10	Pietreczko 91.60	5
3	Heta 90.98	6
Gilding 87.54	4
6	Searle 86.05	2
11	Littler 90.99	6

Quarter-finals (best of 11 legs); 1 September
1	Chisnall 98.64	6
8	Schindler 96.62	5
13	van Gerwen 104.10	4
Wright 108.90	6
15	Gurney 100.94	6
Kenny 97.62	3
3	Heta 92.55	5
11	Littler 99.59	6

Semi-finals (best of 13 legs); 1 September
1	Chisnall 98.67	5
Wright 94.90	7
15	Gurney 97.05	2
11	Littler 107.88	7

Final (best of 15 legs); 1 September
Wright 96.62	8
11	Littler 106.87	5
