= Mario Vandenbogaerde =

Belgian darts player (born 1973)

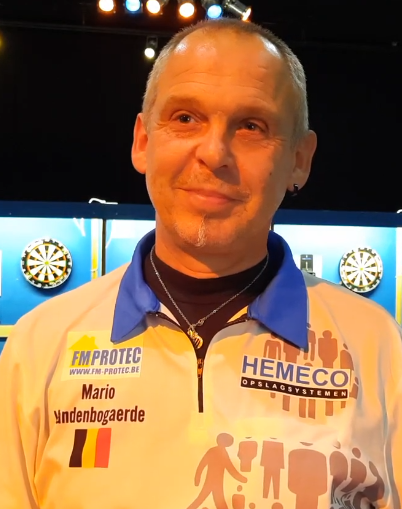
- Vandenbogaerde in 2021

Personal information
- Nickname: "Super Mario"
- Born: 1 June 1973 (age 53) Ypres, Belgium

Sport
- Sport: Darts
- Playing since: 1993
- Darts: 24g Bulls NL Signature
- Laterality: Right-handed
- Walk-on music: "The One and Only" by Chesney Hawkes

Organisation (see split in darts)
- BDO: 2003–2006, 2018–2020
- PDC: 2022–present (Tour Card 2022–present)
- WDF: 2018–2021
- Current world ranking: (PDC) 67 (29 October 2026)

WDF major events – best performances
- World Championship: Semi-final: 2020
- World Masters: Semi-final: 2019
- World Trophy: Last 16: 2019

PDC premier events – best performances
- World Championship: Last 96: 2024
- UK Open: Last 64: 2025
- PC Finals: Last 16: 2023

Other tournament wins
- Years
Belgium National Championships	2005
BDO events
German Open	2019
Luxembourg Masters	2018

Mario Vandenbogaerde (born 1 June 1973) is a Belgian professional darts player who competes in Professional Darts Corporation (PDC) events. Before winning his PDC Tour Card in 2022, Vandenbogaerde won two British Darts Organisation (BDO) ranking titles and reached two BDO major semi-finals at the 2019 World Masters and the 2020 Lakeside World Championship. He has reached two PDC ranking finals, finishing runner-up at Players Championship 28 in 2025 and Players Championship 26 in 2026. His best PDC major performance is reaching the last 16 at the 2023 Players Championship Finals.

== Career ==
In 2005, Vandenbogaerde won the Belgium National Championships, in 2018 he won the Luxembourg Masters and in 2019, he won the German Open, before reaching the semi-finals of the World Masters.

In September 2019, Vandenbogaerde qualified for the 2020 BDO World Darts Championship, which turned out to be the event's last edition and, as the 11th seed, he reached the semi-finals on debut. He was the first Belgian man to reach the semi-finals of a World Championship and the only to do so at the BDO World Championship.

In January 2022, he competed in the PDC's European Q-School and successfully secured a Tour Card during the third day of its final phase (finishing first on the European Q-School Order of Merit).

Vandenbogaerde qualified for the 2024 PDC World Darts Championship, becoming only the second Belgian to have appeared at both the BDO and PDC World Championship (following Eric Clarys), but lost to Thibault Tricole in the first round. As a result, he failed to retain his Tour Card by being in the top 64 of the Order of Merit. Vandenbogaerde immediately regained a Tour Card at Q-School by finishing ninth in the European Q-School Order of Merit.

In September 2025, Vandenbogaerde reached a maiden PDC ranking final at Players Championship 28, losing 8–6 to Ryan Searle. At the 2026 PDC World Championship, he lost 3–0 to David Davies in the first round. He reached his second PDC ranking final at Players Championship 26 in July 2026, where he was beaten 8–6 by Sebastian Białecki.

== World Championship results ==
=== BDO ===
- 2020: Semi-finals (lost to Jim Williams 4–6)

=== PDC ===
- 2024: First round (lost to Thibault Tricole 1–3)
- 2026: First round (lost to David Davies 0–3)

== Performance timeline ==
=== BDO ===
Tournament	2003	2004	2005	2018	2019	2020
BDO Ranked televised events
World Championship	DNP			DNP		SF
World Masters	2R			3R	SF	NH

=== PDC ===
Tournament	2022	2023	2024	2025	2026
PDC Ranked televised events
World Championship	Did not qualify		1R	DNQ	1R
World Masters	Did not qualify				Prel.
UK Open	1R	3R	3R	4R	3R
Players Championship Finals	DNQ	3R	2R	1R	
Career statistics
Season-end ranking (PDC)	105	67	89	64	

=== PDC European Tour ===
Season	1	2	3	4	5	6	7	8	9	10	11	12	13	14	15
2020	Did not qualify			IDO; 1R											
2022	IDO; DNQ	GDC; 1R	Did not qualify					DDC; 1R	Did not qualify				GDT; 1R		
2023	BSD; 2R	EDO; DNQ	IDO; 2R	GDG; 1R	DNQ			CDO; 2R	Did not qualify						
2025	DNQ		IDO; 2R	GDG; 1R	DNQ		DDC; 2R	DNQ		FDT; 3R	Did not qualify				
2026	PDO; DNQ	EDT; 1R	Did not qualify							EDO; 1R	HDT; DNQ	CDO; 2R	FDT; DNQ	SDT; 1R	DDC

=== PDC Players Championships ===
Season	1	2	3	4	5	6	7	8	9	10	11	12	13	14	15	16	17	18	19	20	21	22	23	24	25	26	27	28	29	30	31	32	33	34
2022	BAR; 1R	BAR; 2R	WIG; 2R	WIG; 2R	BAR; 2R	BAR; 4R	NIE; 1R	NIE; 1R	BAR; QF	BAR; 2R	BAR; 1R	BAR; 1R	BAR; 1R	WIG; 1R	WIG; 4R	NIE; 1R	NIE; 1R	BAR; 4R	BAR; 1R	BAR; 2R	BAR; 1R	BAR; 1R	BAR; 2R	BAR; 1R	BAR; 2R	BAR; 1R	BAR; 2R	BAR; 1R	BAR; 2R	BAR; 2R				
2023	BAR; 4R	BAR; 2R	BAR; 2R	BAR; 2R	BAR; 2R	BAR; 1R	HIL; 4R	HIL; 2R	WIG; 2R	WIG; 2R	LEI; 3R	LEI; 1R	HIL; 3R	HIL; QF	LEI; 1R	LEI; 1R	HIL; 2R	HIL; 1R	BAR; 2R	BAR; 3R	BAR; 4R	BAR; 2R	BAR; 3R	BAR; 2R	BAR; 1R	BAR; 3R	BAR; 2R	BAR; 1R	BAR; 2R	BAR; 4R				
2024	WIG; 2R	WIG; 2R	LEI; 3R	LEI; 3R	HIL; 1R	HIL; 1R	LEI; 1R	LEI; 1R	HIL; 2R	HIL; 2R	HIL; 3R	HIL; 3R	MIL; 1R	MIL; 4R	MIL; 2R	MIL; 1R	MIL; 2R	MIL; 2R	MIL; 3R	WIG; 1R	WIG; 3R	LEI; 2R	LEI; 1R	WIG; 1R	WIG; 1R	WIG; 2R	WIG; 2R	WIG; 1R	LEI; 1R	LEI; 3R				
2025	WIG; 1R	WIG; 1R	ROS; 1R	ROS; 1R	LEI; 3R	LEI; 1R	HIL; 1R	HIL; 4R	LEI; 2R	LEI; 1R	LEI; 2R	LEI; 4R	ROS; 4R	ROS; 3R	HIL; 1R	HIL; 2R	LEI; 3R	LEI; 1R	LEI; 2R	LEI; 3R	LEI; 2R	HIL; 1R	HIL; 1R	MIL; 1R	MIL; 2R	HIL; 1R	HIL; 1R	LEI; F	LEI; 1R	LEI; 2R	WIG; 2R	WIG; 3R	WIG; 1R	WIG; 1R
2026	HIL; 2R	HIL; 4R	WIG; 1R	WIG; 1R	LEI; 1R	LEI; 1R	LEI; 1R	LEI; 1R	WIG; 1R	WIG; 1R	MIL; 1R	MIL; 2R	HIL; 2R	HIL; 2R	LEI; 2R	LEI; DNP	LEI; 1R	LEI; 2R	MIL; 1R	MIL; 2R	WIG; 2R	WIG; 2R	LEI; 3R	LEI; 1R	HIL; 1R	HIL; F	LEI; 1R	LEI; 1R	ROS; 2R	ROS; 2R	ROS; 2R	ROS; 1R	LEI; 1R	LEI; 2R

Performance Table Legend
W	Won the tournament	F	Finalist	SF	Semifinalist	QF	Quarterfinalist	#R; RR; Prel.	Lost in # round Round-robin; Preliminary round	DQ	Disqualified
DNQ	Did not qualify	DNP	Did not participate	WD	Withdrew	NH	Tournament not held	#R; RR; Prel.	Lost in # round Round-robin; Preliminary round	NYF	Not yet founded
