= Robert Owen (darts player) =

Welsh darts player (born 1984)

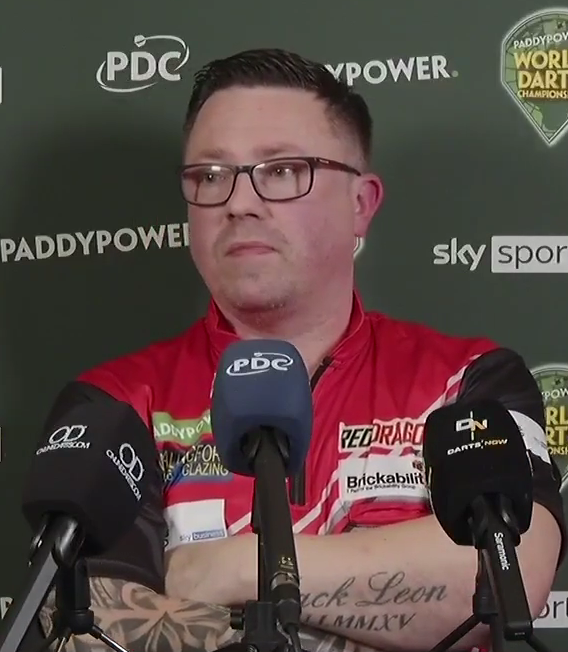
- Owen at the 2025 World Championship

Personal information
- Full name: Robert Owen
- Nickname: "Stack Attack"
- Born: September 23, 1984 (age 42) Ogmore Valley, Wales
- Home town: Lewistown, Bridgend, Wales

Sport
- Sport: Darts
- Playing since: 2008
- Darts: 23g Red Dragon
- Laterality: Right-handed
- Walk-on music: "Jumping All Over the World" by Scooter

Organisation (see split in darts)
- PDC: 2014–present (Tour Card: 2014–2019; 2023–present)
- WDF: 2021–2022
- Current world ranking: (PDC) 62 (5 November 2026)

PDC premier events – best performances
- World Championship: Last 16: 2025
- UK Open: Semi-final: 2018
- PC Finals: Last 64: 2017, 2026

Other tournament wins
- Years
WDF Ranked
England Classic	2022
PDC Challenge Tour
2022 CT16

Robert Owen (born 23 September 1984) is a Welsh professional darts player competes in Professional Darts Corporation (PDC) events. He reached his first PDC major semi-final at the 2018 UK Open. Owen won his first secondary tour title at 2022 PDC Challenge Tour 16. His placing on the Challenge Tour ranking re-gained him a PDC Tour Card, which he has held since 2023, having previously had one from 2014 to 2019. Owen previously competed in World Darts Federation (WDF) events, winning the 2022 England Classic.

His best World Championship performance is reaching the last 16 at the 2025 PDC World Championship.

== Career ==
Owen secured himself a Tour card in 2014 with a one-day win in PDC Q-School. During the first two years, he was not able to earn enough prize money on the PDC Pro Tour to get into top 64 and had to play Q-School again in 2016. This time he earned a Tour Card via the points ranking. Later in the year, he only managed to qualify once for an event on the European Darts Tour with the 2016 European Darts Grand Prix.

In February 2017 he reached the quarter-finals of Players Championship 2 and qualified for three tournaments on the European Tour. Owen amazingly reached the quarter finals of the 2017 Dutch Darts Masters after defeating Jamie Bain, Cristo Reyes and Simon Whitlock, but was narrowly defeated in 6–5 by Michael Smith.

He made his televised debut at the 2017 Players Championship Finals, but was defeated by top seed Rob Cross 6–2 in the first round.

Despite his results in 2017, he had to compete again at Q-School in 2018, where he secured a Tour card for the third time by winning the second day. Owen qualified for the 2018 UK Open, where starting at the second round stage, he defeated Michael Burgoine, Jamie Lewis, Nathan Rafferty, Ian White and John Part to reach the semi finals in only his second televised event, but was defeated by Corey Cadby.

However, Owen lost his Tour card after failing to qualify for the 2020 PDC World Darts Championship. He was unable to earn his card back at Q-School. Owen therefore competed in tournaments on the PDC Challenge Tour for the first time. He reached the 2020 UK Open via a Rileys Qualifier, where he was eliminated in the first round by Lewis Williams.

In January 2022, he reached the final at PDC Challenge Tour 1 but lost to Scott Williams 5–2. In July, he reached a second final at Challenge Tour 13 but lost to Jurjen van der Velde 5–3. In September, however, he prevailed in the Challenge Tour 16 final against the Christian Kist 5–2, securing his first title in the PDC. Owen was the runner-up on the 2022 PDC Challenge Tour series Order of Merit, which qualified him for the 2023 PDC World Darts Championship and secured him a Tour card for the 2023 and 2024 seasons. He was eliminated in the first round by Andrew Gilding 3–2. On 5 September 2023, Owen hit a nine-dart finish against Ritchie Edhouse at Players Championship 21.

Owen initially did not qualify for 2025 PDC World Darts Championship, having finished in 33rd place on the Pro Tour Order of Merit race, one place below the cut-off. However, after Dom Taylor received a suspension due to failed drug test, Owen replaced him in the tournament. He won 3–1 against Niels Zonneveld in the first round, then defeated 27th seed Gabriel Clemens 3–1 in the second round. By beating Ricky Evans 4–2 in the third round, Owen secured his Tour Card for the 2025 season and reached the last 16 of the World Championship for the first time. He exited the tournament following a 4–3 loss to Callan Rydz. Owen finished the 2024 season in 59th place on the Order of Merit.

Owen earned a 10–8 win against Michael van Gerwen in the last 32 of the 2025 UK Open, before losing 10–8 to James Wade in the next round.

== Personal life ==
Owen studied at Ogmore Comprehensive School and Bridgend College. His wife Robyn works with the NHS, while Owen himself still works part time as a delivery driver for Iceland.

== World Championship results ==
=== PDC ===
- 2023: First round (lost to Andrew Gilding 2–3)
- 2025: Fourth round (lost to Callan Rydz 3–4)

== Performance timeline ==
Tournament	2017	2018	2019	2020	2023	2024	2025	2026
PDC Ranked televised events
World Championship	Did not qualify				1R	DNQ	4R	DNQ
World Masters	Did not qualify							Prel.
UK Open	DNQ	SF	3R	1R	1R	3R	6R	3R
Players Championship Finals	1R	Did not qualify						
Career statistics
Year-end ranking (PDC)	80	76	74	-	116	59	63	

=== PDC European Tour ===
Season	1	2	3	4	5	6	7	8	9	10	11	12	13	14	15
2016	Did not qualify								EDG; 1R	GDC; DNQ					
2017	GDC; DNQ	GDM; 1R	Did not qualify						DDM; QF	GDG; 1R	DNQ				
2018	Did not qualify				EDG; 1R	DNQ			EDM; 1R	Did not qualify					
2019	Did not qualify					EDG; 1R	Did not qualify								
2023	DNQ			GDG; 1R	DNQ		BDO; 1R	Did not qualify				HDT; 1R	GDC; DNQ		
2024	Did not qualify								GDC; 2R	FDT; 2R	DNQ		CDO; 1R		
2025	DNQ		IDO; 1R	Did not qualify								HDT; 2R	DNQ		
2026	Did not qualify					ADO; 2R	DNQ			EDO; 2R	HDT; DNQ	CDO; 1R	FDT; DNQ	SDT; 1R	DDC; DNQ

=== PDC Players Championships ===
Season	1	2	3	4	5	6	7	8	9	10	11	12	13	14	15	16	17	18	19	20	21	22	23	24	25	26	27	28	29	30	31	32	33	34
2014	BAR; 2R	BAR; 2R	CRA; 1R	CRA; 1R	WIG; 1R	WIG; 1R	WIG; 1R	WIG; 1R	CRA; DNP		COV; 1R	COV; 1R	CRA; 2R	CRA; 1R	DUB; 3R	DUB; 1R	CRA; DNP		COV; 1R	COV; 1R														
2015	BAR; 1R	BAR; 3R	BAR; 1R	BAR; 1R	BAR; 1R	COV; 2R	COV; 2R	COV; 1R	Did not participate				WIG; 1R	WIG; 1R	BAR; DNP		DUB; 2R	DUB; 2R	COV; DNP	COV; 1R														
2016	BAR; 3R	BAR; 2R	BAR; 1R	BAR; 1R	BAR; 1R	BAR; 2R	BAR; 1R	COV; 1R	COV; 1R	BAR; 2R	BAR; 1R	BAR; 1R	BAR; 1R	BAR; 1R	BAR; 1R	BAR; 1R	DUB; 2R	DUB; 2R	BAR; 1R	BAR; 3R														
2017	BAR; 2R	BAR; QF	BAR; 1R	BAR; 1R	MIL; 1R	MIL; 1R	BAR; 1R	BAR; 2R	WIG; 2R	WIG; 1R	MIL; 4R	MIL; 1R	WIG; 3R	WIG; 1R	BAR; 2R	BAR; 2R	BAR; 1R	BAR; 1R	DUB; 1R	DUB; 4R	BAR; 3R	BAR; 1R												
2018	BAR; 2R	BAR; 2R	BAR; 2R	BAR; 2R	MIL; 1R	MIL; 1R	BAR; 2R	BAR; 1R	WIG; 1R	WIG; 4R	MIL; 1R	MIL; 2R	WIG; 4R	WIG; 1R	BAR; 1R	BAR; 1R	BAR; 1R	BAR; 2R	DUB; 1R	DUB; 3R	BAR; 2R	BAR; 1R												
2019	WIG; 1R	WIG; 1R	WIG; 3R	WIG; 2R	BAR; 1R	BAR; 1R	WIG; 1R	WIG; 1R	BAR; 1R	BAR; 1R	BAR; 2R	BAR; 1R	BAR; 4R	BAR; 2R	BAR; 1R	BAR; 1R	WIG; 1R	WIG; 1R	BAR; DNP	BAR; 1R	HIL; 1R	HIL; 1R	BAR; 2R	BAR; 1R	BAR; 1R	BAR; 2R	DUB; QF	DUB; 1R	BAR; 3R	BAR; 1R				
2020 (Note: Not a Tour card holder)	Did not participate																																	
2021	Did not participate																																	
2022	Did not participate				BAR; 1R	BAR; 2R	Did not participate					BAR; 3R	BAR; 1R	WIG; 3R	WIG; 4R	NIE; 2R	NIE; 1R	Did not participate				BAR; 3R	BAR; 1R	BAR; 2R	Did not participate									
2023	BAR; 1R	BAR; 1R	BAR; 2R	BAR; 3R	BAR; 2R	BAR; 1R	HIL; 3R	HIL; 1R	WIG; 1R	WIG; 2R	LEI; 1R	LEI; 1R	HIL; 1R	HIL; 1R	LEI; 1R	LEI; 2R	HIL; DNP	HIL; 1R	BAR; 4R	BAR; 2R	BAR; 3R	BAR; 1R	BAR; 1R	BAR; 2R	BAR; 1R	BAR; 2R	BAR; 1R	BAR; 3R	BAR; 3R	BAR; 2R				
2024	WIG; 1R	WIG; QF	LEI; 1R	LEI; 2R	HIL; 1R	HIL; 2R	LEI; 2R	LEI; 1R	HIL; DNP		HIL; 1R	HIL; 1R	MIL; 1R	MIL; 4R	MIL; 3R	MIL; 1R	MIL; 1R	MIL; 2R	MIL; 1R	WIG; 1R	WIG; 1R	MIL; 2R	MIL; 1R	WIG; 1R	WIG; 3R	WIG; QF	WIG; 1R	WIG; 2R	LEI; 2R	LEI; 1R				
2025	WIG; 1R	WIG; 1R	ROS; 2R	ROS; 1R	LEI; QF	LEI; 1R	HIL; 1R	HIL; 1R	LEI; 1R	LEI; 2R	LEI; 4R	LEI; 2R	ROS; 1R	ROS; 1R	HIL; 1R	HIL; 1R	LEI; 3R	LEI; 1R	LEI; 1R	LEI; 1R	LEI; 1R	HIL; 1R	HIL; 2R	MIL; 2R	MIL; 1R	HIL; 1R	HIL; 1R	LEI; 1R	LEI; 1R	LEI; QF	WIG; 1R	WIG; 1R	WIG; 2R	WIG; 4R
2026	HIL; 1R	HIL; 2R	WIG; 2R	WIG; 1R	LEI; 1R	LEI; 1R	LEI; 2R	LEI; 2R	WIG; 2R	WIG; 1R	MIL; 2R	MIL; 3R	HIL; QF	HIL; 2R	LEI; 1R	LEI; 4R	LEI; QF	LEI; 2R	MIL; 4R	MIL; 4R	WIG; 2R	WIG; 3R	LEI; 2R	LEI; 1R	HIL; 3R	HIL; 1R	LEI; 1R	LEI; 2R	ROS; 2R	ROS; 3R	ROS; 4R	ROS; 1R	LEI; 2R	LEI; 3R

Performance Table Legend
W	Won the tournament	F	Finalist	SF	Semifinalist	QF	Quarterfinalist	#R; RR; Prel.	Lost in # round Round-robin; Preliminary round	DQ	Disqualified
DNQ	Did not qualify	DNP	Did not participate	WD	Withdrew	NH	Tournament not held	#R; RR; Prel.	Lost in # round Round-robin; Preliminary round	NYF	Not yet founded
