= 2025 PDC Players Championship series =

Darts tournament series

The 2025 PDC Players Championship series was a series of 34 non-televised darts tournaments on the 2025 PDC Pro Tour. The Players Championship Order of Merit, a ranking list that only includes the prize money won by each player in the Players Championship events, determined the field of 64 participants for the 2025 Players Championship Finals in November.

The number of events increased by four compared to the four previous years, bringing the total to 34 Players Championship events.

A total of 33 nine-dart finishes were hit during the series.

== Prize money ==
The prize money remained the same as the previous year, with a prize fund for each event of £125,000; £15,000 is given to each event‘s winner.

This is how the prize money is divided:

Stage (no. of players)		Prize money (Total: £125,000)
Winner	(1)	£15,000
Runner-up	(1)	£10,000
Semi-finalists	(2)	£5,000
Quarter-finalists	(4)	£3,500
Last 16 (fourth round)	(8)	£2,500
Last 32 (third round)	(16)	£1,500
Last 64 (second round)	(32)	£1,000

== February ==
=== Players Championship 1 ===
Players Championship 1 was contested on Monday 10 February 2025 at the Robin Park Tennis Centre in Wigan. The tournament was won by Rob Cross who defeated Joe Cullen 8–3 in the final.

Quarter-finals (best of 11 legs)
16	Rob Cross 89.51	6
25	Jermaine Wattimena 93.75	5
29	Andrew Gilding 98.11	6
28	Luke Woodhouse 93.62	3
31	Joe Cullen 98.02	6
Richard Veenstra 99.93	4
3	Luke Humphries 95.64	6
Darryl Pilgrim 88.78	1

Semi-finals (best of 13 legs)
16	Rob Cross 108.55	7
29	Andrew Gilding 99.20	3
31	Joe Cullen 105.05	7
3	Luke Humphries 102.05	6

Final (best of 15 legs)
16	Rob Cross 104.60	8
31	Joe Cullen 94.26	3

=== Players Championship 2 ===
Players Championship 2 was contested on Tuesday 11 February 2025 at the Robin Park Tennis Centre in Wigan. The tournament was won by Gerwyn Price who defeated Chris Dobey 8–7 in the final.

Quarter-finals (best of 11 legs)
1	Dave Chisnall 75.74	2
9	Ross Smith 96.73	6
Florian Hempel 93.30	5
5	Chris Dobey 94.35	6
15	Gian van Veen 85.50	3
7	Ryan Searle 91.72	6
3	Luke Littler 100.88	5
22	Gerwyn Price 102.32	6

Semi-finals (best of 13 legs)
9	Ross Smith 89.10	4
5	Chris Dobey 98.59	7
7	Ryan Searle 98.81	5
22	Gerwyn Price 99.26	7

Final (best of 15 legs)
5	Chris Dobey 101.83	7
22	Gerwyn Price 99.58	8

=== Players Championship 3 ===
Players Championship 3 was contested on Monday 17 February 2025 at the Autotron in Rosmalen. The tournament was won by Chris Dobey who defeated Jelle Klaasen 8–4 in the final.

Quarter-finals (best of 11 legs)
Nick Kenny 88.70	6
24	Jermaine Wattimena 96.02	5
Jelle Klaasen 84.55	6
12	Rob Cross 92.24	4
23	Gerwyn Price 99.53	5
Callan Rydz 103.81	6
3	Chris Dobey 113.54	6
Krzysztof Ratajski 91.55	1

Semi-finals (best of 13 legs)
Nick Kenny 93.16	5
Jelle Klaasen 94.54	7
Callan Rydz 101.69	6
3	Chris Dobey 100.34	7

Final (best of 15 legs)
Jelle Klaasen 87.34	4
3	Chris Dobey 100.87	8

=== Players Championship 4 ===
Players Championship 4 was contested on Tuesday 18 February 2025 at the Autotron in Rosmalen. The tournament was won by Ryan Searle who defeated Cameron Menzies 8–3 in the final.

Quarter-finals (best of 11 legs)
William O'Connor 94.01	4
9	Ryan Searle 101.70	6
Stefan Bellmont 93.62	6
5	Josh Rock 90.27	2
31	Gabriel Clemens 100.51	3
Dom Taylor 106.64	6
19	Cameron Menzies 96.24	6
22	James Wade 90.15	3

Semi-finals (best of 13 legs)
9	Ryan Searle 99.89	7
Stefan Bellmont 98.71	6
Dom Taylor 100.00	4
19	Cameron Menzies 99.00	7

Final (best of 15 legs)
9	Ryan Searle 100.76	8
19	Cameron Menzies 96.99	3

== March ==
=== Players Championship 5 ===
Players Championship 5 was contested on Tuesday 11 March 2025 at the Leicester Arena. Gary Anderson and Luke Littler both hit a nine-dart finish in their victories against Ryan Joyce and Adam Hunt respectively. The tournament was won by Joe Cullen who defeated Gian van Veen 8–7 in the final.

Quarter-finals (best of 11 legs)
16	Gian van Veen 108.16	6
9	Michael van Gerwen 101.49	4
4	Luke Littler 122.96	6
12	Damon Heta 99.57	1
18	Mike De Decker 92.16	6
Robert Owen 89.43	2
30	Joe Cullen 90.60	6
Kevin Doets 87.02	3

Semi-finals (best of 13 legs)
16	Gian van Veen 96.56	7
4	Luke Littler 100.17	6
18	Mike De Decker 93.50	5
30	Joe Cullen 100.60	7

Final (best of 15 legs)
16	Gian van Veen 100.33	7
30	Joe Cullen 104.18	8

=== Players Championship 6 ===
Players Championship 6 was contested on Wednesday 12 March 2025 at the Leicester Arena. Luke Humphries and Alan Soutar both hit a nine-dart finish in their respective victory and defeat against Andy Boulton and Luke Littler. The tournament was won by Gian van Veen who defeated Luke Humphries 8–3 in the final.

Quarter-finals (best of 11 legs)
Kevin Doets 91.43	3
8	Ross Smith 90.72	6
4	Luke Humphries 97.68	6
12	Damon Heta 98.85	5
2	Stephen Bunting 95.30	4
Madars Razma 99.10	6
14	Gian van Veen 99.87	6
22	James Wade 96.74	2

Semi-finals (best of 13 legs)
8	Ross Smith 96.75	4
4	Luke Humphries 107.39	7
Madars Razma 90.44	1
14	Gian van Veen 103.34	7

Final (best of 15 legs)
4	Luke Humphries 97.95	3
14	Gian van Veen 97.41	8

=== Players Championship 7 ===
Players Championship 7 was contested on Monday 17 March 2025 at the Halle 39 in Hildesheim. Ryan Searle, Dirk van Duijvenbode and William O'Connor hit a nine-dart finish. The tournament was won by Gary Anderson who defeated Adam Lipscombe 8–3 in the final.

Quarter-finals (best of 11 legs)
William O'Connor 90.28	4
Adam Lipscombe 94.11	6
29	Kevin Doets 92.84	3
21	Dirk van Duijvenbode 93.49	6
15	Gary Anderson 104.72	6
26	Krzysztof Ratajski 98.15	5
19	Peter Wright 92.36	3
11	Mike De Decker 97.91	6

Semi-finals (best of 13 legs)
Adam Lipscombe 91.03	7
21	Dirk van Duijvenbode 95.21	4
15	Gary Anderson 99.98	7
11	Mike De Decker 89.48	3

Final (best of 15 legs)
Adam Lipscombe 89.58	3
15	Gary Anderson 93.64	8

=== Players Championship 8 ===
Players Championship 8 was contested on Tuesday 18 March 2025 at the Halle 39 in Hildesheim. Lukas Wenig hit a nine-dart finish in his defeat against Dom Taylor. The tournament was won by Martin Schindler who defeated Jeffrey de Graaf 8–1 in the final.

Quarter-finals (best of 11 legs)
Dylan Slevin 85.70	5
Jeffrey de Graaf 88.51	6
29	Dom Taylor 99.78	6
5	Ryan Searle 106.27	5
2	Martin Schindler 92.76	6
26	Kevin Doets 90.02	5
30	Niels Zonneveld 94.22	4
Patrick Geeraets 92.11	6

Semi-finals (best of 13 legs)
Jeffrey de Graaf 88.04	7
29	Dom Taylor 94.74	4
2	Martin Schindler 85.86	7
Patrick Geeraets 87.56	6

Final (best of 15 legs)
Jeffrey de Graaf 78.31	1
2	Martin Schindler 86.57	8

=== Players Championship 9 ===
Players Championship 9 was contested on Monday 31 March 2025 at the Leicester Arena. Gary Anderson hit a nine-dart finish in his victory against Krzysztof Ratajski. The tournament was won by Gerwyn Price who defeated Ian White 8–4 in the final.

Quarter-finals (best of 11 legs)
16	Gerwyn Price 90.69	6
Niels Zonneveld 86.37	3
29	Andrew Gilding 93.58	2
Brendan Dolan 94.83	6
18	Cameron Menzies 96.43	6
7	Ross Smith 93.23	4
Ian White 86.75	6
6	Josh Rock 87.96	5

Semi-finals (best of 13 legs)
16	Gerwyn Price 114.36	7
Brendan Dolan 93.61	0
18	Cameron Menzies 87.31	3
Ian White 98.60	7

Final (best of 15 legs)
16	Gerwyn Price 94.67	8
Ian White 96.99	4

== April ==
=== Players Championship 10 ===
Players Championship 10 was contested on Tuesday 1 April 2025 at the Leicester Arena. The tournament was won by Josh Rock who defeated Cameron Menzies 8–4 in the final.

Quarter-finals (best of 11 legs)
16	Cameron Menzies 93.14	6
24	Raymond van Barneveld 89.86	4
4	Stephen Bunting 97.28	1
21	Michael Smith 100.76	6
2	Luke Littler 92.98	4
Scott Williams 86.90	6
3	Martin Schindler 91.82	1
6	Josh Rock 110.34	6

Semi-finals (best of 13 legs)
16	Cameron Menzies 92.13	7
21	Michael Smith 91.71	5
Scott Williams 94.54	5
6	Josh Rock 98.16	7

Final (best of 15 legs)
16	Cameron Menzies 92.90	4
6	Josh Rock 95.56	8

=== Players Championship 11 ===
Players Championship 11 was contested on Tuesday 8 April 2025 at the Leicester Arena. The tournament was won by Cameron Menzies who defeated Peter Wright 8–3 in the final.

Quarter-finals (best of 11 legs)
Adam Lipscombe 85.31	1
Niels Zonneveld 95.86	6
Matthew Dennant 88.30	2
12	Cameron Menzies 92.01	6
15	Gary Anderson 109.93	6
10	Damon Heta 105.12	2
3	Josh Rock 99.04	5
22	Peter Wright 98.81	6

Semi-finals (best of 13 legs)
Niels Zonneveld 82.65	2
12	Cameron Menzies 87.15	7
15	Gary Anderson 103.92	5
22	Peter Wright 105.88	7

Final (best of 15 legs)
12	Cameron Menzies 107.25	8
22	Peter Wright 103.45	3

=== Players Championship 12 ===
Players Championship 12 was contested on Wednesday 9 April 2025 at the Leicester Arena. Josh Rock hit a nine-dart finish in his victory against Matt Campbell. The tournament was won by Gerwyn Price who defeated Josh Rock 8–7 in the final.

Quarter-finals (best of 11 legs)
Ian White 97.72	6
24	Luke Woodhouse 94.22	3
13	Jonny Clayton 98.61	1
12	Gerwyn Price 112.25	6
18	Ritchie Edhouse 97.84	4
10	Gian van Veen 97.84	6
3	Josh Rock 108.05	6
11	Gary Anderson 101.46	3

Semi-finals (best of 13 legs)
Ian White 98.84	2
12	Gerwyn Price 110.80	7
10	Gian van Veen 99.77	4
3	Josh Rock 100.45	7

Final (best of 15 legs)
12	Gerwyn Price 101.39	8
3	Josh Rock 110.70	7

=== Players Championship 13 ===
Players Championship 13 was contested on Monday 14 April 2025 at the Autotron in Rosmalen. Wessel Nijman hit a nine-dart finish in his victory against Robert Owen. The tournament was won by Damon Heta who defeated Nathan Aspinall 8–6 in the final.

Quarter-finals (best of 11 legs)
32	Martin Lukeman 74.05	2
24	Nathan Aspinall 84.17	6
4	Martin Schindler 93.82	5
12	Jonny Clayton 97.70	6
Karel Sedláček 93.13	2
10	Damon Heta 94.85	6
14	Wessel Nijman 91.16	4
22	Andrew Gilding 95.41	6

Semi-finals (best of 13 legs)
24	Nathan Aspinall 88.31	7
12	Jonny Clayton 84.71	4
10	Damon Heta 101.20	7
22	Andrew Gilding 97.62	2

Final (best of 15 legs)
24	Nathan Aspinall 88.45	6
10	Damon Heta 94.91	8

=== Players Championship 14 ===
Players Championship 14 was contested on Tuesday 15 April 2025 at the Autotron in Rosmalen. Ross Smith hit a nine-dart finish in his victory against Thibault Tricole. The tournament was won by Jonny Clayton who defeated Dominik Grüllich 8–2 in the final.

Quarter-finals (best of 11 legs)
Dominik Grüllich 88.98	6
24	Dirk van Duijvenbode 95.30	5
20	Michael Smith 97.15	6
28	Ricardo Pietreczko 89.30	2
15	Danny Noppert 95.10	6
Mickey Mansell 87.45	1
19	James Wade 87.75	0
11	Jonny Clayton 101.33	6

Semi-finals (best of 13 legs)
Dominik Grüllich 95.12	7
20	Michael Smith 90.53	4
15	Danny Noppert 91.88	3
11	Jonny Clayton 103.56	7

Final (best of 15 legs)
Dominik Grüllich 92.24	2
11	Jonny Clayton 109.68	8

== May ==
=== Players Championship 15 ===
Players Championship 15 was contested on Monday 12 May 2025 at the Halle 39 in Hildesheim. Luke Woodhouse hit a nine-dart finish in his defeat against Martijn Dragt. Dave Chisnall hit a nine-dart finish in his victory against Darius Labanauskas. Krzysztof Ratajski won his first title since September 2023 by defeating Dave Chisnall 8–4 in the final.

Quarter-finals (best of 11 legs)
32	Dom Taylor 94.18	3
Scott Williams 101.65	6
4	Ross Smith 102.56	5
28	Krzysztof Ratajski 96.52	6
2	Dave Chisnall 104.28	6
10	Mike De Decker 88.79	2
14	Danny Noppert 103.57	6
6	Gian van Veen 99.44	1

Semi-finals (best of 13 legs)
Scott Williams 91.28	4
28	Krzysztof Ratajski 96.70	7
2	Dave Chisnall 97.82	7
14	Danny Noppert 97.58	6

Final (best of 15 legs)
28	Krzysztof Ratajski 101.73	8
2	Dave Chisnall 98.39	4

=== Players Championship 16 ===
Players Championship 16 was contested on Tuesday 13 May 2025 at the Halle 39 in Hildesheim. Ross Smith won his last twenty-four consecutive legs of the tournament; he whitewashed Brendan Dolan 8–0 in the final. Smith also hit two nine-dart finishes during the tournament; in his victories against both Dylan Slevin and Chris Landman.

Quarter-finals (best of 11 legs)
32	Gabriel Clemens 97.86	6
25	Kevin Doets 94.25	4
Brendan Dolan 94.32	6
12	Dirk van Duijvenbode 91.14	3
15	Luke Woodhouse 92.94	6
Ricky Evans 87.18	4
3	Ross Smith 98.02	6
11	Danny Noppert 87.14	0

Semi-finals (best of 13 legs)
32	Gabriel Clemens 99.81	5
Brendan Dolan 93.80	7
15	Luke Woodhouse 89.24	0
3	Ross Smith 105.21	7

Final (best of 15 legs)
Brendan Dolan 93.86	0
3	Ross Smith 104.56	8

== June ==
=== Players Championship 17 ===
Players Championship 17 was contested on Tuesday 17 June 2025 at the Leicester Arena. The tournament was won by Chris Dobey who defeated Dirk van Duijvenbode 8–7 in the final.

Quarter-finals (best of 11 legs)
16	Dirk van Duijvenbode 97.38	6
25	Michael Smith 93.77	1
Richard Veenstra 91.44	2
5	Damon Heta 108.94	6
18	James Wade 87.76	3
10	Chris Dobey 98.93	6
Thibault Tricole 83.47	3
11	Gian van Veen 90.52	6

Semi-finals (best of 13 legs)
16	Dirk van Duijvenbode 98.62	7
5	Damon Heta 97.03	6
10	Chris Dobey 97.26	7
11	Gian van Veen 94.02	5

Final (best of 15 legs)
16	Dirk van Duijvenbode 102.4	7
10	Chris Dobey 98.69	8

=== Players Championship 18 ===
Players Championship 18 was contested on Wednesday 18 June 2025 at the Leicester Arena. The tournament was won by Stephen Bunting who defeated Jermaine Wattimena 8–5 in the final.

Quarter-finals (best of 11 legs)
1	Dave Chisnall 93.08	6
Cam Crabtree 88.30	4
4	Stephen Bunting 102.51	6
Karel Sedláček 94.69	5
31	Niels Zonneveld 88.33	6
Benjamin Reus 95.44	5
14	Mike De Decker 103.42	5
19	Jermaine Wattimena 97.87	6

Semi-finals (best of 13 legs)
1	Dave Chisnall 100.52	6
4	Stephen Bunting 97.54	7
31	Niels Zonneveld 90.23	6
19	Jermaine Wattimena 99.49	7

Final (best of 15 legs)
4	Stephen Bunting 104.84	8
19	Jermaine Wattimena 99.65	5

=== Players Championship 19 ===
Players Championship 19 was contested on Thursday 19 June 2025 at the Leicester Arena. The tournament was won by James Wade who defeated Scott Williams 8–3 in the final.

Quarter-finals (best of 11 legs)
17	James Wade 98.20	6
9	Gian van Veen 100.43	4
20	Andrew Gilding 98.70	6
5	Damon Heta 86.97	2
Scott Williams 89.12	6
Bradley Brooks 90.66	2
Alan Soutar 89.67	5
11	Wessel Nijman 99.67	6

Semi-finals (best of 13 legs)
17	James Wade 98.74	7
20	Andrew Gilding 92.19	3
Scott Williams 93.87	7
11	Wessel Nijman 93.90	6

Final (best of 15 legs)
17	James Wade 101.52	8
Scott Williams 99.58	3

== July ==
=== Players Championship 20 ===
Players Championship 20 was contested on Tuesday 8 July 2025 at the Leicester Arena. Josh Rock, Leon Weber and Stephen Bunting hit a nine-dart finish in their victories against Sebastian Białecki, Tytus Kanik and Rob Cross respectively. The tournament was won by Damon Heta who defeated Stephen Bunting 8–7 in the final.

Quarter-finals (best of 11 legs)
16	Gerwyn Price 100.13	6
8	Jonny Clayton 101.33	4
4	Damon Heta 97.37	6
21	Daryl Gurney 93.33	1
2	Stephen Bunting 97.36	6
7	Ross Smith 88.72	1
30	Rob Cross 109.81	6
6	Josh Rock 108.89	5

Semi-finals (best of 13 legs)
16	Gerwyn Price 95.27	5
4	Damon Heta 109.14	7
2	Stephen Bunting 100.19	7
30	Rob Cross 97.85	6

Final (best of 15 legs)
4	Damon Heta 98.86	8
2	Stephen Bunting 102.09	7

=== Players Championship 21 ===
Players Championship 21 was contested on Wednesday 9 July 2025 at the Leicester Arena. Dirk van Duijvenbode hit a nine-dart finish in his victory against Jim Williams. The tournament was won by Bradley Brooks who defeated Gerwyn Price 8–5 in the final.

Quarter-finals (best of 11 legs)
32	Kevin Doets 89.62	4
James Hurrell 85.24	6
Bradley Brooks 94.46	6
5	Josh Rock 96.06	1
18	Andrew Gilding 87.26	6
Wesley Plaisier 91.05	5
14	Gerwyn Price 99.26	6
27	Krzysztof Ratajski 95.24	2

Semi-finals (best of 13 legs)
James Hurrell 92.62	6
Bradley Brooks 95.47	7
18	Andrew Gilding 90.70	4
14	Gerwyn Price 99.18	7

Final (best of 15 legs)
Bradley Brooks 96.46	8
14	Gerwyn Price 100.73	5

=== Players Championship 22 ===
Players Championship 22 was contested on Tuesday 29 July 2025 at the Halle 39 in Hildesheim. The tournament was won by Sebastian Białecki who defeated Niels Zonneveld 8–6 in the final.

Quarter-finals (best of 11 legs)
Jimmy van Schie 84.53	4
8	Danny Noppert 85.30	6
Sebastian Białecki 101.00	6
5	Gian van Veen 95.11	4
Matthew Dennant 88.83	3
Cam Crabtree 99.82	6
19	Niels Zonneveld 92.87	6
Jamai van den Herik 90.03	1

Semi-finals (best of 13 legs)
8	Danny Noppert 91.57	5
Sebastian Białecki 92.90	7
Cam Crabtree 95.48	5
19	Niels Zonneveld 98.31	7

Final (best of 15 legs)
Sebastian Białecki 91.78	8
19	Niels Zonneveld 90.03	6

=== Players Championship 23 ===
Players Championship 23 was contested on Wednesday 30 July 2025 at the Halle 39 in Hildesheim. Gian van Veen hit a nine-dart finish in his victory against Ryan Meikle. The tournament was won by Jermaine Wattimena who defeated Lukas Wenig 8–5 in the final.

Quarter-finals (best of 11 legs)
17	Ryan Joyce 90.90	4
9	Jermaine Wattimena 98.11	6
Mervyn King 86.04	3
Bradley Brooks 94.17	6
Justin Hood 82.57	2
Lukas Wenig 89.02	6
3	Ross Smith 87.00	3
6	Wessel Nijman 92.59	6

Semi-finals (best of 13 legs)
9	Jermaine Wattimena 99.95	7
Bradley Brooks 94.10	2
Lukas Wenig 89.64	7
6	Wessel Nijman 92.34	6

Final (best of 15 legs)
9	Jermaine Wattimena 95.52	8
Lukas Wenig 93.56	5

== August ==
=== Players Championship 24 ===
Players Championship 24 was contested on Monday 25 August 2025 at Arena MK in Milton Keynes. Jeffrey de Graaf won his first PDC ranking title by defeating Stephen Bunting 8–7 in the final. Scott Williams hit a nine-dart finish in his victory against James Hurrell.

Quarter-finals (best of 11 legs)
16	Dirk van Duijvenbode 95.47	4
Scott Williams 87.63	6
Alan Soutar 91.04	2
Jeffrey de Graaf 98.28	6
2	Stephen Bunting 99.57	6
26	Rob Cross 102.00	1
Karel Sedláček 92.57	1
6	Ross Smith 101.47	6

Semi-finals (best of 13 legs)
Scott Williams 88.24	1
Jeffrey de Graaf 92.93	7
2	Stephen Bunting 106.49	7
6	Ross Smith 94.25	2

Final (best of 15 legs)
Jeffrey de Graaf 102.10	8
2	Stephen Bunting 106.31	7

=== Players Championship 25 ===
Players Championship 25 was contested on Tuesday 26 August 2025 at Arena MK in Milton Keynes. Stephen Bunting won his second Players Championship title of the year by defeating Jonny Clayton 8–6 in the final. Dirk van Duijvenbode hit a nine-dart finish in his defeat against Daryl Gurney.

Quarter-finals (best of 11 legs)
1	Stephen Bunting 105.67	6
8	Wessel Nijman 95.64	1
29	William O'Connor 104.28	6
Karel Sedláček 96.07	3
2	Martin Schindler 104.86	6
7	Gian van Veen 98.14	3
Alan Soutar 98.03	1
6	Jonny Clayton 106.64	6

Semi-finals (best of 13 legs)
1	Stephen Bunting 98.00	7
29	William O'Connor 93.83	6
2	Martin Schindler 100.29	6
6	Jonny Clayton 98.78	7

Final (best of 15 legs)
1	Stephen Bunting 101.73	8
6	Jonny Clayton 91.34	6

== September ==
=== Players Championship 26 ===
Players Championship 26 was contested on Tuesday 9 September 2025 at the Halle 39 in Hildesheim. Gerwyn Price won his fourth Players Championship title of the year, defeating Gian van Veen 8–5 in the final.

Quarter-finals (best of 11 legs)
16	Danny Noppert 95.96	5
9	Gary Anderson 89.53	6
4	Gian van Veen 101.65	6
5	Ross Smith 96.78	3
2	Gerwyn Price 96.99	6
7	Wessel Nijman 95.52	5
Bradley Brooks 96.18	3
22	William O'Connor 104.09	6

Semi-finals (best of 13 legs)
9	Gary Anderson 96.62	4
4	Gian van Veen 104.62	7
2	Gerwyn Price 97.32	7
22	William O'Connor 93.49	6

Final (best of 15 legs)
4	Gian van Veen 97.40	5
2	Gerwyn Price 109.28	8

=== Players Championship 27 ===
Players Championship 27 was contested on Wednesday 10 September 2025 at the Halle 39 in Hildesheim. Joe Cullen won his second title of the year by defeating Gerwyn Price 8–7 in the final. Danny Noppert hit a nine-dart finish in his victory against Mario Vandenbogaerde.

Quarter-finals (best of 11 legs)
James Hurrell 96.41	4
24	Joe Cullen 99.19	6
29	Scott Williams 101.94	6
Alexander Merkx 91.00	1
2	Gerwyn Price 88.56	6
Michael Unterbuchner 87.83	4
14	Danny Noppert 86.38	6
Richard Veenstra 86.37	1

Semi-finals (best of 13 legs)
24	Joe Cullen 100.63	7
29	Scott Williams 94.83	1
2	Gerwyn Price 104.98	7
14	Danny Noppert 92.82	3

Final (best of 15 legs)
24	Joe Cullen 99.78	8
2	Gerwyn Price 97.31	7

=== Players Championship 28 ===
Players Championship 28 was contested on Tuesday 30 September 2025 at the Leicester Arena. Ryan Searle won his second title of the year by defeating Mario Vandenbogaerde 8–6 in the final. Niko Springer, Adam Hunt and Stefan Bellmont each hit a nine-dart finish.

Quarter-finals (best of 11 legs)
16	Jermaine Wattimena 90.29	5
Mario Vandenbogaerde 91.56	6
Michele Turetta 81.20	2
Brendan Dolan 89.23	6
Kevin Doets 97.72	6
7	Jonny Clayton 100.88	4
19	Ryan Searle 102.62	6
Darren Beveridge 94.62	4

Semi-finals (best of 13 legs)
Mario Vandenbogaerde 93.87	7
Brendan Dolan 83.86	3
Kevin Doets 94.17	4
19	Ryan Searle 100.02	7

Final (best of 15 legs)
Mario Vandenbogaerde 89.38	6
19	Ryan Searle 95.43	8

== October ==
=== Players Championship 29 ===
Players Championship 29 was contested on Wednesday 1 October 2025 at the Leicester Arena. Ross Smith won his second title of the year by defeating Josh Rock 8–7 in the final. Rock also hit a nine-dart finish in his victory against Wesley Plaisier.

Quarter-finals (best of 11 legs)
Ryan Meikle 95.55	4
8	Ross Smith 97.91	6
13	Wessel Nijman 98.02	6
5	Jonny Clayton 89.10	0
18	Gary Anderson 96.39	6
7	Luke Humphries 103.20	5
3	Josh Rock 94.92	6
11	Danny Noppert 89.29	2

Semi-finals (best of 13 legs)
8	Ross Smith 105.02	7
13	Wessel Nijman 98.39	3
18	Gary Anderson 98.59	4
3	Josh Rock 97.79	7

Final (best of 15 legs)
8	Ross Smith 104.32	8
3	Josh Rock 102.76	7

=== Players Championship 30 ===
Players Championship 30 was contested on Thursday 2 October 2025 at the Leicester Arena. The tournament was won by Wessel Nijman who defeated Damon Heta 8–3 in the final.

Quarter-finals (best of 11 legs)
16	Chris Dobey 96.14	2
9	Wessel Nijman 100.49	6
13	Ryan Searle 91.34	6
Mickey Mansell 84.52	3
Robert Owen 91.59	3
7	Damon Heta 90.91	6
Bradley Brooks 95.22	5
Wesley Plaisier 96.93	6

Semi-finals (best of 13 legs)
9	Wessel Nijman 98.18	7
13	Ryan Searle 91.42	2
7	Damon Heta 90.22	7
Wesley Plaisier 91.75	6

Final (best of 15 legs)
9	Wessel Nijman 103.44	8
7	Damon Heta 102.00	3

=== Players Championship 31 ===
Players Championship 31 was contested on Tuesday 14 October 2025 at the Robin Park Tennis Centre in Wigan. Jermaine Wattimena won his second title of the year by defeating Nathan Aspinall 8–2 in the final. Aspinall also hit two nine-dart finishes in his respective victories against Steve Lennon and Lukas Wenig.

Quarter-finals (best of 11 legs)
1	Stephen Bunting 96.84	6
9	Wessel Nijman 100.62	4
13	Nathan Aspinall 98.09	6
12	James Wade 98.56	5
Joe Hunt 92.38	2
23	Niels Zonneveld 99.52	6
14	Jermaine Wattimena 88.38	6
Chris Landman 87.06	1

Semi-finals (best of 13 legs)
1	Stephen Bunting 96.08	3
13	Nathan Aspinall 92.00	7
23	Niels Zonneveld 72.32	0
14	Jermaine Wattimena 101.16	7

Final (best of 15 legs)
13	Nathan Aspinall 85.84	2
14	Jermaine Wattimena 101.02	8

=== Players Championship 32 ===
Players Championship 32 was contested on Wednesday 15 October 2025 at the Robin Park Tennis Centre in Wigan. Luke Littler won his fourth Players Championship title by defeating Dennie Olde Kalter 8–2 in the final. Andreas Harrysson hit a nine-dart finish in his victory against Radek Szagański.

Quarter-finals (best of 11 legs)
1	Stephen Bunting 98.61	6
8	Wessel Nijman 87.46	2
13	Luke Littler 100.64	6
Rhys Griffin 89.64	3
15	Chris Dobey 100.24	5
10	Jermaine Wattimena 100.34	6
Dennie Olde Kalter 96.76	6
11	Nathan Aspinall 95.84	4

Semi-finals (best of 13 legs)
1	Stephen Bunting 107.20	3
13	Luke Littler 109.50	7
10	Jermaine Wattimena 89.38	4
Dennie Olde Kalter 89.73	7

Final (best of 15 legs)
13	Luke Littler 110.73	8
Dennie Olde Kalter 97.35	2

=== Players Championship 33 ===
Players Championship 33 was contested on Wednesday 29 October 2025 at the Robin Park Tennis Centre in Wigan. Chris Dobey won his third title of the year by defeating William O'Connor 8–6 in the final. This win confirmed Dobey's qualification for the 2025 Grand Slam of Darts. Nathan Aspinall and Damon Heta both hit a nine-dart finish in their victories against Ian White and George Killington respectively.

Quarter-finals (best of 11 legs)
17	Ryan Joyce 97.43	6
Cam Crabtree 89.18	1
20	William O'Connor 93.00	6
Thibault Tricole 87.86	3
2	Gerwyn Price 85.55	0
7	Wessel Nijman 98.02	6
3	Nathan Aspinall 91.36	2
11	Chris Dobey 111.29	6

Semi-finals (best of 13 legs)
17	Ryan Joyce 87.17	2
20	William O'Connor 92.90	7
7	Wessel Nijman 93.50	2
11	Chris Dobey 94.67	7

Final (best of 15 legs)
20	William O'Connor 96.46	6
11	Chris Dobey 99.72	8

=== Players Championship 34 ===
Players Championship 34 was contested on Thursday 30 October 2025 at the Robin Park Tennis Centre in Wigan. Wessel Nijman won his third title by defeating Luke Woodhouse 8–5 in the final.

Quarter-finals (best of 11 legs)
Dimitri Van den Bergh 88.88	4
9	Chris Dobey 99.18	6
29	Kevin Doets 86.63	4
5	Wessel Nijman 89.77	6
18	William O'Connor 95.64	6
7	Jermaine Wattimena 93.58	1
14	Luke Woodhouse 112.29	6
Keane Barry 89.83	2

Semi-finals (best of 13 legs)
9	Chris Dobey 104.33	6
5	Wessel Nijman 100.70	7
18	William O'Connor 86.33	2
14	Luke Woodhouse 90.88	7

Final (best of 15 legs)
5	Wessel Nijman 100.45	8
14	Luke Woodhouse 97.33	5

== Players Championship Order of Merit ==
The top 64 on the Players Championship Order of Merit qualified for the 2025 Players Championship Finals:

Prize money in the table is in units of £1,000.

Standings after PC34

Rank	Player	Prize money	Rank	Player	Prize money
1	Gerwyn Price (WAL)	103	33	Sebastian Białecki (POL)	39.5
2	Wessel Nijman (NED)	98	34	Nathan Aspinall (ENG)	38.5
3	Damon Heta (AUS)	92.5	35	Dom Taylor (ENG)	38.5
4	Ross Smith (ENG)	92.5	36	Luke Littler (ENG)	37.5
5	Chris Dobey (ENG)	90	37	Cam Crabtree (ENG)	36
6	Jermaine Wattimena (NED)	89.5	38	Ryan Joyce (ENG)	35.5
7	Gian van Veen (NED)	89	39	Raymond van Barneveld (NED)	35.5
8	Stephen Bunting (ENG)	84.5	40	Daryl Gurney (NIR)	35.5
9	Cameron Menzies (SCO)	73	41	Martin Lukeman (ENG)	34.5
10	Josh Rock (NIR)	65.5	42	Ian White (ENG)	34.5
11	Ryan Searle (ENG)	65.5	43	Callan Rydz (ENG)	34
12	Jonny Clayton (WAL)	65	44	Alan Soutar (SCO)	33.5
13	William O'Connor (IRL)	63	45	Mario Vandenbogaerde (BEL)	33
14	Joe Cullen (ENG)	61.5	46	Mickey Mansell (NIR)	30.5
15	Danny Noppert (NED)	61	47	Madars Razma (LAT)	30
16	Martin Schindler (GER)	60.5	48	Nick Kenny (WAL)	30
17	Niels Zonneveld (NED)	59.5	49	Michael Smith (ENG)	30
18	Dirk van Duijvenbode (NED)	58	50	Ricky Evans (ENG)	29.5
19	James Wade (ENG)	54.5	51	Peter Wright (SCO)	29.5
20	Gary Anderson (SCO)	53.5	52	Ricardo Pietreczko (GER)	29.5
21	Luke Woodhouse (ENG)	52.5	53	James Hurrell (ENG)	29
22	Kevin Doets (NED)	52	54	Darren Beveridge (SCO)	29
23	Scott Williams (ENG)	48.5	55	Gabriel Clemens (GER)	29
24	Bradley Brooks (ENG)	47.5	56	Adam Lipscombe (ENG)	28.5
25	Brendan Dolan (NIR)	47.5	57	Ritchie Edhouse (ENG)	28
26	Krzysztof Ratajski (POL)	47	58	Luke Humphries (ENG)	28
27	Dave Chisnall (ENG)	45.5	59	Wesley Plaisier (NED)	28
28	Mike De Decker (BEL)	44	60	Keane Barry (IRL)	27.5
29	Jeffrey de Graaf (SWE)	43	61	Niko Springer (GER) (Note: Niko Springer withdrew from the Players Championship Finals due to illness. He was replaced by the highest-ranked non-qualifier from the Players Championship Order of Merit, Ryan Meikle.)	27.5
30	Andrew Gilding (ENG)	42	62	Justin Hood (ENG)	27
31	Karel Sedláček (CZE)	41.5	63	Richard Veenstra (NED)	26.5
32	Rob Cross (ENG)	40.5	64	Max Hopp (GER)	26.5

Rank	Player	Prize money
65	Ryan Meikle (ENG)	26.5

== Nine-darters ==
The table below lists all 33 nine-dart finishes hit during the 2025 Players Championship season. In the case one player has multiple nine-darters, this is indicated by the number in brackets.

Number	Event	Round	Player	Result	Opponent	Ref
1.	5	1	Gary Anderson (SCO)	6 – 5	Ryan Joyce	
2.	5	2	Luke Littler (ENG)	6 – 5	Adam Hunt	
3.	6	1	Luke Humphries (ENG)	6 – 3	Andy Boulton	
4.	6	1	Alan Soutar (SCO)	5 – 6	Luke Littler	
5.	7	1	Ryan Searle (ENG)	6 – 5	Joshua Richardson	
6.	7	2	Dirk van Duijvenbode (NED)	6 – 2	Thomas Lovely	
7.	7	Quarter-final	William O’Connor (IRL)	6 – 1	Jimmy van Schie	
8.	8	1	Lukas Wenig (GER)	4 – 6	Dom Taylor	
9.	9	1	Gary Anderson (2)	6 – 5	Krzysztof Ratajski	
10.	12	3	Josh Rock (NIR)	6 – 4	Matt Campbell	
11.	13	1	Wessel Nijman (NED)	6 – 0	Robert Owen	
12.	14	2	Ross Smith (ENG)	6 – 3	Thibault Tricole	
13.	15	2	Luke Woodhouse (ENG)	4 – 6	Martijn Dragt	
14.	15	2	Dave Chisnall (ENG)	6 – 1	Darius Labanauskas	
15.	16	1	Ross Smith (2)	6 – 3	Dylan Slevin	
16.	16	Quarter-final	Ross Smith (3)	6 – 3	Chris Landman	
17.	20	1	Josh Rock (2)	6 – 1	Sebastian Białecki	
18.	20	1	Leon Weber (GER)	6 – 3	Tytus Kanik	
19.	20	Semi-final	Stephen Bunting (ENG)	7 – 6	Rob Cross	
20.	21	1	Dirk van Duijvenbode (2)	6 – 4	Jim Williams	
21.	23	3	Gian van Veen (NED)	6 – 2	Ryan Meikle	
22.	24	3	Scott Williams (ENG)	6 – 0	James Hurrell	
23.	25	3	Dirk van Duijvenbode (3)	2 – 6	Daryl Gurney	
24.	27	1	Danny Noppert (NED)	6 – 4	Mario Vandenbogaerde	
25.	28	1	Niko Springer (GER)	6 – 1	Dimitri Van den Bergh	
26.	28	2	Adam Hunt (ENG)	6 – 2	Bradley Brooks	
27.	28	2	Stefan Bellmont (SUI)	2 – 6	Wessel Nijman	
28.	29	3	Josh Rock (3)	6 – 3	Wesley Plaisier	
29.	31	2	Nathan Aspinall (ENG)	6 – 4	Steve Lennon	
30.	31	4	Nathan Aspinall (2)	6 – 5	Lukas Wenig	
31.	32	1	Andreas Harrysson (SWE)	6 – 5	Radek Szagański	
32.	33	1	Nathan Aspinall (3)	6 – 2	Ian White	
33.	33	1	Damon Heta (AUS)	6 – 5	George Killington	

== Top averages ==
The table lists all players who achieved a three-dart average of at least 110 in a match. In the case one player has multiple records, this is indicated by the number in brackets.

#	Player	Round	Average	Event	Result	Ref
1	Luke Littler	Quarter-final	122.96	5	Won	
2	Josh Rock	4	119.04	11	Won	
3	Bradley Brooks	1	117.49	20	Won	
4	Wessel Nijman	4	116.87	34	Won	
5	James Wade	2	115.92	5	Won	
6	Gary Anderson	1	115.66	9	Won	
7	Bradley Brooks (2)	1	114.38	11	Won	
8	Gerwyn Price	Semi-final	114.36	9	Won	
9	Gary Anderson (2)	3	114.15	8	Won	
10	Ryan Joyce	4	114.03	23	Won	
11	Dimitri Van den Bergh	2	113.97	1	Won	
12	Chris Dobey	Quarter-final	113.54	3	Won	
13	Dave Chisnall	3	113.18	7	Won	
14	Gerwyn Price (2)	1	113.05	8	Won	
15	Luke Humphries	1	112.99	29	Won	
16	Nick Kenny	2	112.32	4	Won	
17	Luke Woodhouse	Quarter-final	112.29	34	Won	
18	Gerwyn Price (3)	Quarter-final	112.25	12	Won	
19	Gerwyn Price (4)	3	112.15	3	Won	
20	Bradley Brooks (3)	2	111.96	26	Won	
21	Ross Smith	1	111.88	18	Won	
22	Gary Anderson (3)	3	111.84	10	Won	
23	Stephen Bunting	3	111.72	10	Won	
24	Gian van Veen	3	111.68	23	Won	
25	Stephen Bunting (2)	2	111.66	25	Won	
26	Gary Anderson (4)	3	111.43	16	Won	
27	Wessel Nijman (2)	1	111.33	13	Won	
28	Stephen Bunting (3)	2	111.29	7	Won	
28	Chris Dobey (2)	Quarter-final	111.29	33	Won	
30	Jonny Clayton	1	111.16	14	Won	
31	Michael Van Gerwen	3	111.13	5	Won	
32	Jonny Clayton (2)	4	110.92	28	Won	
33	Luke Woodhouse (2)	1	110.87	3	Won	
34	Gerwyn Price (5)	Semi-final	110.80	12	Won	
34	Jonny Clayton (3)	3	110.80	25	Won	
36	Josh Rock (2)	Final	110.70	12	Lost	
37	Danny Noppert	1	110.68	18	Won	
38	Andrew Gilding	1	110.38	19	Won	
39	Josh Rock (3)	1	110.34	4	Won	
40	Luke Humphries (2)	2	110.30	7	Won	
41	Michael van Gerwen (2)	2	110.21	29	Won	
42	Andreas Harrysson	2	110.18	22	Won	
43	Daryl Gurney	3	110.17	23	Won	
