= Karel Sedláček =

Czech darts player (born 1979)

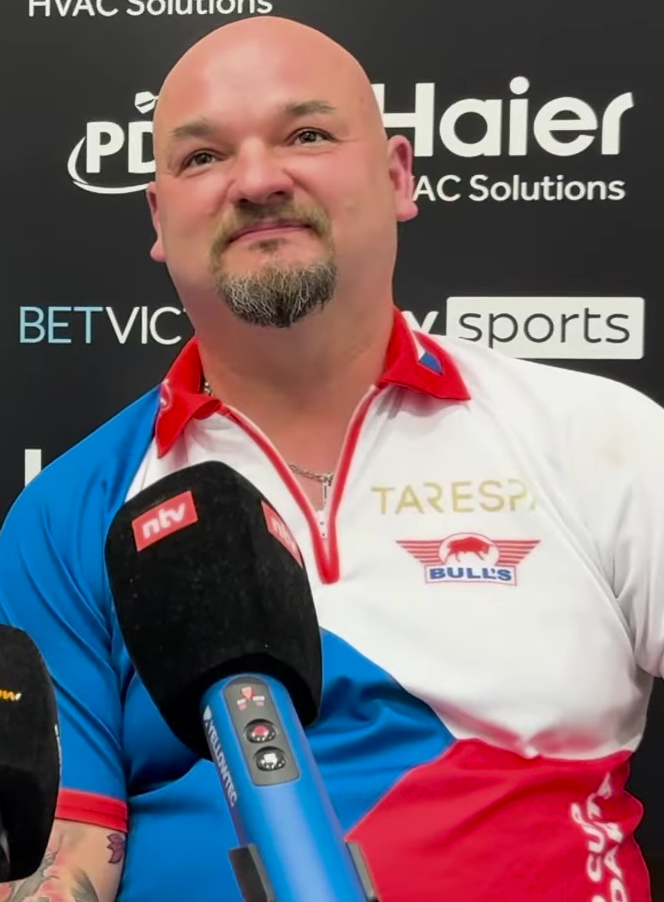
- Sedláček with the Czech Republic at the 2025 PDC World Cup of Darts

Personal information
- Nickname: "Evil Charlie"
- Born: 17 February 1979 (age 47) Náchod, Czechoslovakia
- Home town: Bohdašín, Czech Republic

Sport
- Sport: Darts
- Playing since: 1995
- Darts: 21g Bull's NL Signature
- Laterality: Right-handed
- Walk-on music: "Rock the Boat" by The Hues Corporation "The Final Countdown" by Europe

Organisation (see split in darts)
- BDO: 2007–2017
- PDC: 2018–present (Tour Card: 2020–2021; 2023–present)
- Current world ranking: (PDC) 42 ▼2 (5 November 2026)

WDF major events – best performances
- World Championship: Last 32: 2015
- World Masters: Last 144: 2013
- World Trophy: Last 16: 2014

PDC premier events – best performances
- World Championship: Last 64: 2023
- UK Open: Last 32: 2023
- Grand Slam: Group Stage: 2025. 2026
- European Championship: Last 32: 2022, 2026
- PC Finals: Last 16: 2020
- World Series Finals: Last 16: 2026

Other tournament wins
- Years
Czech Open	2018
Medal record
Men's Darts
Representing Czech Republic
EDU European Ch'ship
Bronze medal – third place	2014 Poreč	Men's singles
Bronze medal – third place	2016 Poreč	Men's singles

Karel Sedláček (born 17 February 1979) is a Czech professional darts player who competes in Professional Darts Corporation (PDC) events. Nicknamed "Evil Charlie", he reached the last 16 at both the 2014 BDO World Trophy and the 2020 Players Championship Finals. A three-time quarter-finalist on the PDC European Tour, he reached three Players Championship semi-finals before winning his first PDC ranking title at 2026 Players Championship 30.

Sedláček has represented the Czech Republic at the PDC World Cup of Darts, reaching the quarter-finals in 2025 alongside Petr Křivka.

== Early and personal life ==
Sedláček began playing darts at 15 after receiving darts equipment from a classmate, and started playing in tournaments two years later. After serving in the military, he began playing darts again.

Outside of darts, Sedláček runs a gas warehouse in Trutnov.

== Career ==
Sedláček's nickname, "Evil Charlie", derives from a spectator having shouted "To je zlej Kája!" ("That's evil, Charlie!") after he defeated an opponent heavily in a league match.

=== BDO ===
Sedláček qualified for the 2014 BDO World Darts Championship playing Paul Hogan in the preliminary round, losing 3–1. He qualified for the 2014 BDO World Trophy, won in the first round 6–1 over Robbie Green, then lost in the last 16 to Paul Jennings 7–2. He qualified for the 2015 BDO World Darts Championship, playing Paul Coughlin in the preliminary round; he won 3–2. He lost to Glen Durrant 3–1 in the first round, despite having the highest average, 99.58, of all the first round matches, and the third-highest losing average in Lakeside history.

=== PDC ===
In 2018 Sedláček qualified for the Dutch Darts Championship in Maastricht. He won the East European qualifier to qualify for the 2019 PDC World Darts Championship, his first qualification for that event.

Following a 3–0 defeat to Keegan Brown at the World Championship, he went on to qualify for the 2019 German Darts Grand Prix in Munich. Wins over Diogo Portela, Ian White and Darren Webster saw Sedláček reach the quarter-finals, where he went down 6–5 to Max Hopp.

Sedláček was also able to qualify for his home tournament, the 2019 Czech Darts Open, where he was eventually beaten in the second round 6–4 by Ian White.

On 18 January 2020, he beat Berry van Peer in the final of Day Three at European Q-School to win a PDC Tour Card for the first time, making him the first Czech player to earn a Tour Card.

At the 2021 UK Open, Sedláček won 6–0 against Rhys Griffin but was then eliminated by Simon Whitlock 10–7. On the PDC Pro Tour, Sedláček reached at most the last 16 whereupon he lost his Tour Card and had to go back to 2022 Q-School. As a former Tour Card holder he started in the final stage, but he didn't win his Tour Card back.

Despite not having a Tour Card, Sedláček qualified for the 2022 European Championship after regularly appearing at European Tour events through East Europe qualifiers. He lost in the first round 6–4 against Michael Smith. Sedláček also qualified for the 2023 PDC World Darts Championship, where he defeated Raymond Smith 3–0 in the first round before losing 3–2 in a tiebreaker against Dirk van Duijvenbode, a match where Sedláček had a dart to win it.

Sedláček regained his PDC Tour Card at 2023 Q-School, finishing 6th on the European Order of Merit.

In 2024 Sedláček made it to the quarter-finals at a Players Championship event for the first time at Players Championship 6 in Hildesheim and made it to the semi-finals at Players Championship 16 in Milton Keynes. These results helped him qualify for the 2024 Players Championship Finals as the 43rd seed, where he lost to 22nd seed Ryan Joyce 6–4 in the first round. After a one year absence, Sedláček also qualified for the 2025 PDC World Championship, where he was trying to secure his Tour Card by finishing the season in the top 65 on the PDC Order of Merit. However, he lost to debutant Rhys Griffin 3–0 in sets in the first round. Due to the results of Robert Owen, Nick Kenny and Jeffrey de Graaf at the World Championship, he dropped to 66th place on the rankings and lost his Tour Card, but he regained it at 2025 Q-School.

== World Championship results ==
=== BDO World Championship ===
- 2014: Preliminary round (lost to Paul Hogan 1–3)
- 2015: First round (lost to Glen Durrant 1–3)

=== PDC World Championship ===
- 2019: First round (lost to Keegan Brown 0–3)
- 2021: First round (lost to Ryan Joyce 2–3)
- 2023: Second round (lost to Dirk van Duijvenbode 2–3)
- 2025: First round (lost to Rhys Griffin 0–3)
- 2026: First round (lost to Wessel Nijman 0–3)

== Performance timeline ==
Sedláček's performance timeline is as follows:

=== BDO ===
Tournament	2013	2014	2015
BDO Ranked televised events
World Championship	DNP	Prel.	1R
World Trophy	NH	2R	1R
World Masters	2R	1R	1R

=== PDC ===
Tournament	2017	2018	2019	2020	2021	2022	2023	2024	2025	2026
PDC Ranked televised events
World Championship	DNQ		1R	DNQ	1R	DNQ	2R	DNQ	1R	1R
World Masters	Did not qualify								Prel.	Prel.
UK Open	Did not qualify			3R	4R	DNP	5R	2R	1R	3R
European Championship	Did not qualify					1R	DNQ			1R
Grand Slam	Did not qualify								RR	RR
Players Championship Finals	DNP			3R	DNQ			1R	1R	
PDC Non-ranked televised events
World Cup	1R	1R	1R	1R	1R	1R	RR	2R	QF	2R
World Series Finals	Did not qualify									2R
Career statistics
Year-end ranking (PDC)	NR	180	152	81	71	68	108	66	68	

==== European Tour ====
Season	1	2	3	4	5	6	7	8	9	10	11	12	13	14	15
2018	Did not qualify										DDC; 1R	DNQ			
2019	DNQ		GDG; QF	Did not qualify					CDO; 2R	Did not qualify					
2022	IDO; DNQ	GDC; QF	GDG; 2R	ADO; 1R	EDO; 2R	CDO; 2R	EDG; 1R	DNQ		HDT; 3R	GDO; 1R	BDO; 2R	GDT; WD		
2023	Did not qualify							CDO; 3R	Did not qualify				GDC; 1R		
2024	Did not qualify				ADO; 1R	DNQ		EDO; 2R	DNQ			SDT; 2R	CDO; DNQ		
2025	DNQ		IDO; QF	GDG; DNQ	ADO; 2R	EDG; DNQ	DDC; 1R	DNQ		FDT; 2R	CDO; 1R	HDT; DNQ	SDT; DNQ	GDC; 1R	
2026	PDO; DNQ	EDT; 2R	BDO; DNQ	GDG; 3R	EDG; 1R	ADO; 1R	IDO; 2R	BSD; 2R	SDO; 1R	EDO; 2R	HDT; DNQ	CDO; 1R	FDT; 2R	SDT; QF	DDC; 2R

==== Players Championships ====
Season	1	2	3	4	5	6	7	8	9	10	11	12	13	14	15	16	17	18	19	20	21	22	23	24	25	26	27	28	29	30	31	32	33	34
2020	BAR; 3R	BAR; 1R	WIG; 1R	WIG; 4R	WIG; 1R	WIG; 1R	BAR; DNP		MIL; 2R	MIL; 1R	MIL; 2R	MIL; 1R	MIL; 2R	NIE; 4R	NIE; 1R	NIE; 1R	NIE; 3R	NIE; 4R	COV; 1R	COV; 1R	COV; 1R	COV; 1R	COV; 4R											
2021	BOL; 1R	BOL; 2R	BOL; 1R	BOL; 1R	MIL; 1R	MIL; 4R	MIL; 1R	MIL; 2R	NIE; 1R	NIE; 1R	NIE; 2R	NIE; 1R	MIL; 1R	MIL; 1R	MIL; 2R	MIL; 3R	COV; 1R	COV; 1R	COV; 1R	COV; 2R	BAR; 2R	BAR; 1R	BAR; 3R	BAR; 1R	BAR; 2R	BAR; 2R	BAR; 4R	BAR; 3R	BAR; 1R	BAR; 2R				
2022 (Note: Not a Tour card holder)	Did not participate						NIE; 1R	NIE; 3R	Did not participate					WIG; 1R	WIG; 3R	NIE; 1R	NIE; 1R	BAR; 2R	BAR; 4R	BAR; 2R	BAR; 3R	BAR; 1R	BAR; 3R	BAR; 1R	BAR; 2R	BAR; 2R	BAR; 1R	BAR; 1R	BAR; 2R	BAR; 2R				
2023	BAR; 1R	BAR; 3R	BAR; 1R	BAR; 1R	BAR; 2R	BAR; 1R	HIL; 1R	HIL; 3R	WIG; 1R	WIG; 1R	LEI; 2R	LEI; 1R	HIL; 4R	HIL; 1R	LEI; 2R	LEI; 3R	HIL; 1R	HIL; 2R	BAR; 1R	BAR; 1R	BAR; 2R	BAR; 1R	BAR; 1R	BAR; 2R	BAR; 2R	BAR; 1R	BAR; 1R	BAR; 2R	BAR; 1R	BAR; 1R				
2024	WIG; 1R	WIG; 3R	LEI; 2R	LEI; 1R	HIL; 1R	HIL; QF	LEI; 4R	LEI; 3R	HIL; 1R	HIL; 4R	HIL; 2R	HIL; 2R	MIL; 2R	MIL; 2R	MIL; 2R	MIL; SF	MIL; 2R	MIL; 3R	MIL; 1R	WIG; 1R	WIG; 3R	MIL; 1R	MIL; 1R	WIG; 4R	WIG; 1R	WIG; 1R	WIG; 1R	WIG; 3R	LEI; 1R	LEI; 2R				
2025	WIG; 2R	WIG; 2R	ROS; 3R	ROS; 1R	LEI; 1R	LEI; 2R	HIL; 4R	HIL; 2R	LEI; 2R	LEI; 1R	LEI; 1R	LEI; 4R	ROS; QF	ROS; 1R	HIL; 1R	HIL; 2R	LEI; 3R	LEI; QF	LEI; 1R	LEI; 3R	LEI; 2R	HIL; 4R	HIL; 1R	MIL; QF	MIL; QF	HIL; 1R	HIL; 1R	LEI; 4R	LEI; 1R	LEI; 2R	WIG; 2R	WIG; 1R	WIG; 3R	WIG; 4R
2026	HIL; 1R	HIL; 1R	WIG; 4R	WIG; 3R	LEI; SF	LEI; 2R	LEI; 1R	LEI; 1R	WIG; 3R	WIG; SF	MIL; 4R	MIL; 2R	HIL; 2R	HIL; 1R	LEI; 2R	LEI; 2R	LEI; 1R	LEI; 2R	MIL; 1R	MIL; 2R	WIG; 4R	WIG; 1R	LEI; 3R	LEI; 1R	HIL; 2R	HIL; QF	LEI; 1R	LEI; 4R	ROS; 2R	ROS; W	ROS; 1R	ROS; QF	LEI; 1R	LEI; 2R

Performance Table Legend
W	Won the tournament	F	Finalist	SF	Semifinalist	QF	Quarterfinalist	#R; RR; Prel.	Lost in # round Round-robin; Preliminary round	DQ	Disqualified
DNQ	Did not qualify	DNP	Did not participate	WD	Withdrew	NH	Tournament not held	#R; RR; Prel.	Lost in # round Round-robin; Preliminary round	NYF	Not yet founded
