= 2026 European Championship (darts) =

Darts tournament

2026 Machineseeker European Championship

Tournament information
- Dates: 22–25 October 2026
- Venue: Westfalenhallen
- Location: Dortmund, Germany
- Organisation(s): Professional Darts Corporation (PDC)
- Format: Legs
- Prize fund: £750,000
- Winner's share: £150,000
- Nine-dart finish: Luke Woodhouse
- High checkout: 167 Martin Schindler

Champion(s)
- Ross Smith (ENG)

The 2026 European Championship (known for sponsorship reasons as the 2026 Machineseeker European Championship) was a professional darts tournament held at the Westfalenhallen in Dortmund, Germany, from 22 to 25 October 2026. It was the 19th staging of the European Championship by the Professional Darts Corporation (PDC). The total prize fund was £750,000, with the winner receiving £150,000.

The tournament featured the top 32 players based on ranking money earned in the 15 European Tour events that were held as part of the 2026 PDC Pro Tour. Gian van Veen was the defending champion, having defeated Luke Humphries 11–10 in the 2025 final, but he lost 10–6 to Luke Woodhouse in the second round. Woodhouse also hit a nine-dart finish in the fourth leg of his first round match against Dirk van Duijvenbode.

Kevin Doets and Niels Zonneveld made their debuts at the tournament.

Ross Smith won the tournament, his third major title and second European Championship, by defeating Martin Schindler 11–8 in the final. Schindler also became the first German player to reach the final of a PDC major.

== Overview ==
=== Prize money ===
The prize fund increased to £750,000, with £150,000 going to the winner. The prize fund breakdown was:

Position (num. of players)		Prize money (Total: £750,000)
Winner	(1)	£150,000
Runner-up	(1)	£80,000
Semi-finalists	(2)	£50,000
Quarter-finalists	(4)	£35,000
Second round	(8)	£20,000
First round	(16)	£7,500

== Qualification ==
The 2026 European Tour was held as part of the 2026 PDC Pro Tour and consisted of 15 events. Following the final event of the season, the Dutch Darts Championship, the top 32 players on the European Tour Order of Merit qualified for the European Championship. Ross Smith entered the tournament as the top seed after winning two titles during the season: the International Darts Open and the Hungarian Darts Trophy.

12th seed & 2025 runner-up Luke Humphries withdrew from the tournament after the draw with illness. 33rd ranked Kim Huybrechts replaced him directly in the draw.

The following players qualified for the tournament:

1. Ross Smith (ENG) (champion)
2. Wessel Nijman (NED) (first round)
3. Krzysztof Ratajski (POL) (semi-finals)
4. Niels Zonneveld (NED) (first round)
5. Danny Noppert (NED) (first round)
6. Nathan Aspinall (ENG) (second round)
7. Jonny Clayton (WAL) (quarter-finals)
8. Gian van Veen (NED) (second round)
9. Luke Woodhouse (ENG) (quarter-finals)
10. Josh Rock (NIR) (second round)
11. Luke Littler (ENG) (quarter-finals)
12. ~~Luke Humphries (ENG)~~ (withdrew)
13. Gerwyn Price (WAL) (semi-finals)
14. Kevin Doets (NED) (second round)
15. Ryan Joyce (ENG) (first round)
16. James Wade (ENG) (first round)
17. Damon Heta (AUS) (second round)
18. Jermaine Wattimena (NED) (second round)
19. Michael van Gerwen (NED) (first round)
20. Rob Cross (ENG) (first round)
21. Ryan Searle (ENG) (first round)
22. William O'Connor (IRL) (first round)
23. Chris Dobey (ENG) (first round)
24. Dirk van Duijvenbode (NED) (first round)
25. Andrew Gilding (ENG) (first round)
26. Niko Springer (GER) (first round)
27. Cristo Reyes (ESP) (first round)
28. Stephen Bunting (ENG) (quarter-finals)
29. Cameron Menzies (SCO) (second round)
30. Dave Chisnall (ENG) (first round)
31. Martin Schindler (GER) (runner-up)
32. Karel Sedláček (CZE) (first round)
33. Kim Huybrechts (BEL) (second round)

== Draw ==
The draw was confirmed on 19 October following the culmination of the Dutch Darts Championship. Numbers to the left of a player's name show the 32 seedings for the tournament. The figures to the right of a player's name state their three-dart average in a match. Players in bold denote match winners.

**First round** (best of 11 legs); 22–23 October
**1**	**Ross Smith 91.83**	**6**
32	Karel Sedláček 89.81	4
16	James Wade 96.48	5
**17**	**Damon Heta 91.48**	**6**
**8**	**Gian van Veen 95.21**	**6**
25	Andrew Gilding 93.62	4
**9**	**Luke Woodhouse 99.11**	**6**
24	Dirk van Duijvenbode 84.82	3
4	Niels Zonneveld 90.00	3
**29**	**Cameron Menzies 93.75**	**6**
**13**	**Gerwyn Price 99.26**	**6**
20	Rob Cross 90.90	2
5	Danny Noppert 90.92	5
**28**	**Stephen Bunting 89.81**	**6**
**Alt**	**Kim Huybrechts 103.81**	**6**
21	Ryan Searle 98.59	1
2	Wessel Nijman 89.53	5
**31**	**Martin Schindler 93.34**	**6**
15	Ryan Joyce 88.65	3
**18**	**Jermaine Wattimena 87.00**	**6**
**7**	**Jonny Clayton 96.81**	**6**
26	Niko Springer 95.76	3
**10**	**Josh Rock 100.74**	**6**
23	Chris Dobey 87.12	1
**3**	**Krzysztof Ratajski 91.21**	**6**
30	Dave Chisnall 87.90	2
**14**	**Kevin Doets 97.14**	**6**
19	Michael van Gerwen 95.70	3
**6**	**Nathan Aspinall 92.92**	**6**
27	Cristo Reyes 95.30	3
**11**	**Luke Littler 105.05**	**6**
22	William O'Connor 97.28	3

**Second round** (best of 19 legs); 24 October
**1**	**Ross Smith 96.19**	**10**
17	Damon Heta 90.70	7
8	Gian van Veen 91.47	6
**9**	**Luke Woodhouse 95.34**	**10**
29	Cameron Menzies 94.66	4
**13**	**Gerwyn Price 95.75**	**10**
**28**	**Stephen Bunting 96.83**	**10**
Alt	Kim Huybrechts 94.99	3
**31**	**Martin Schindler 90.25**	**10**
18	Jermaine Wattimena 92.05	4
**7**	**Jonny Clayton 98.28**	**10**
10	Josh Rock 93.15	8
**3**	**Krzysztof Ratajski 96.95**	**10**
14	Kevin Doets 93.16	8
6	Nathan Aspinall 105.57	5
**11**	**Luke Littler 114.47**	**10**

**Quarter-finals** (best of 19 legs); 25 October
**1**	**Ross Smith 107.00**	**10**
9	Luke Woodhouse 103.40	6
**13**	**Gerwyn Price 103.03**	**10**
28	Stephen Bunting 95.20	3
**31**	**Martin Schindler 103.16**	**10**
7	Jonny Clayton 98.92	1
**3**	**Krzysztof Ratajski 100.79**	**10**
11	Luke Littler 99.08	6

**Semi-finals** (best of 21 legs); 25 October
**1**	**Ross Smith 92.55**	**11**
13	Gerwyn Price 93.69	7
**31**	**Martin Schindler 98.88**	**11**
3	Krzysztof Ratajski 93.39	6

**Final** (best of 21 legs); 25 October
**1**	**Ross Smith 92.92**	**11**
31	Martin Schindler 91.49	8
