= 2024 Masters (darts) =

Twelfth staging of the Masters darts tournament of the PDC

2024 Cazoo Masters

Tournament information
- Dates: 2–4 February 2024
- Venue: Arena MK
- Location: Milton Keynes, England
- Organisation(s): Professional Darts Corporation (PDC)
- Format: Legs; Final: best of 21 legs
- Prize fund: £275,000
- Winner's share: £65,000
- High checkout: 160 Dave Chisnall

Champion(s)
- Stephen Bunting (ENG)

The 2024 Masters (known for sponsorship reasons as the 2024 Cazoo Masters) was the twelfth staging of the PDC Masters darts tournament, held by the Professional Darts Corporation, from 2 to 4 February 2024, at Arena MK in Milton Keynes. It was the final staging of the tournament as a non-ranking event and using leg play.

Chris Dobey was the defending champion after defeating Rob Cross 11–7 in the 2023 final. However, he lost to Michael van Gerwen 10–4 in the second round.

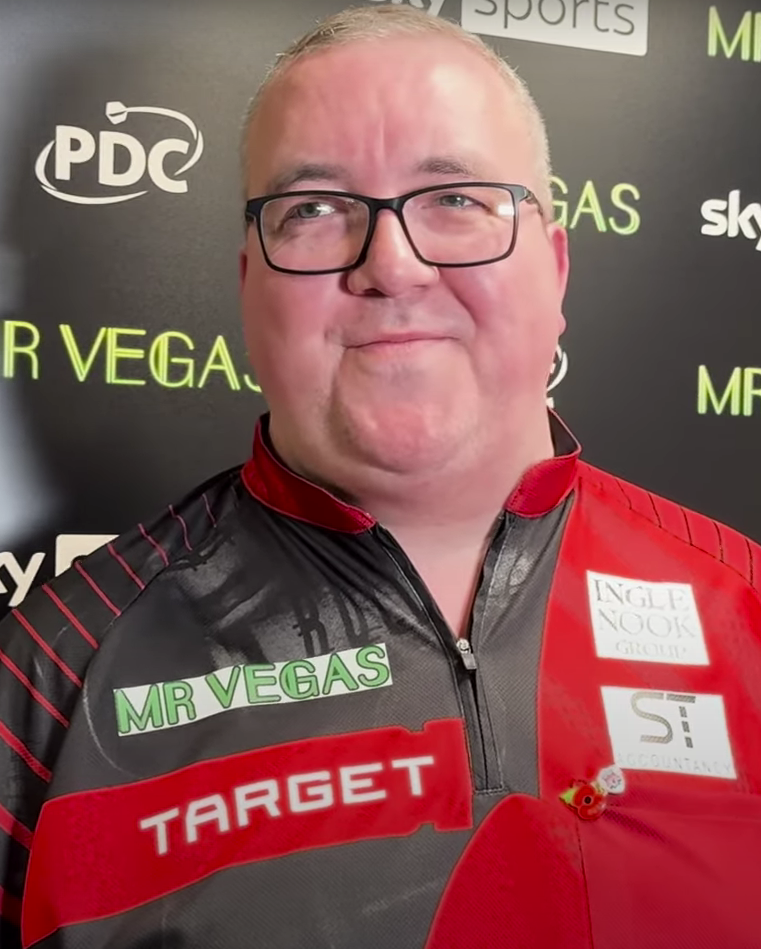
Stephen Bunting won the Masters for the first time in his career.

Stephen Bunting won his first PDC major televised title, beating van Gerwen 11–7 in the final.

== Qualifiers ==
The Masters featured the top 24 players in the PDC Order of Merit after the 2024 PDC World Darts Championship, with the top 8 automatically qualifying for the second round.

Gerwyn Price withdrew from the tournament on 1 February 2024 due to family reasons. José de Sousa (the next highest ranked player) was scheduled to replace Price, but he was unable to, so was replaced by the next highest ranked player who was available, which in this case, was Daryl Gurney.

Martin Schindler, Andrew Gilding and Josh Rock made their debuts in the event.

The following players took part in the tournament:

1. Luke Humphries (second round)
2. Michael van Gerwen (runner-up)
3. Michael Smith (second round)
4. Nathan Aspinall (semi-finals)
5. ~~Gerwyn Price~~ (withdrew)
6. Rob Cross (second round)
7. Danny Noppert (second round)
8. Peter Wright (quarter-finals)
9. Jonny Clayton (first round)
10. Dave Chisnall (quarter-finals)
11. Damon Heta (quarter-finals)
12. Joe Cullen (second round)
13. Dirk van Duijvenbode (second round)
14. Dimitri Van den Bergh (semi-finals)
15. Chris Dobey (second round)
16. Stephen Bunting (champion)
17. Ross Smith (first round)
18. Andrew Gilding (first round)
19. James Wade (first round)
20. Ryan Searle (first round)
21. Josh Rock (first round)
22. Gabriel Clemens (first round)
23. Martin Schindler (first round)
24. Krzysztof Ratajski (second round)
- Alt. Daryl Gurney (quarter-finals)

== Prize money ==
Stage (no. of players)		Prize money (Total: £275,000)
Winner	(1)	£65,000
Runner-up	(1)	£30,000
Semi-finalists	(2)	£20,000
Quarter-finalists	(4)	£12,000
Second round losers	(8)	£7,500
First round losers	(8)	£4,000

== Draw ==
The schedule was confirmed on 22 January.

First round (best of 11 legs); 2 February
16	Stephen Bunting 93.81	6
17	Ross Smith 99.58	5
9	Jonny Clayton 89.12	3
24	Krzysztof Ratajski 93.28	6
13	Dirk van Duijvenbode 88.47	6
20	Ryan Searle 92.58	5
12	Joe Cullen 99.32	6
21	Josh Rock 92.16	4
15	Chris Dobey 94.69	6
18	Andrew Gilding 86.33	3
10	Dave Chisnall 109.26	6
23	Martin Schindler 103.85	1
14	Dimitri Van den Bergh 90.65	6
19	James Wade 84.74	1
11	Damon Heta 102.96	6
22	Gabriel Clemens 99.05	2

Second round (best of 19 legs); 3 February
1	Luke Humphries 99.14	7
16	Stephen Bunting 97.36	10
8	Peter Wright 90.31	10
24	Krzysztof Ratajski 92.78	8
4	Nathan Aspinall 86.61	10
13	Dirk van Duijvenbode 82.73	5
Alt	Daryl Gurney 92.30	10
12	Joe Cullen 92.27	8
2	Michael van Gerwen 96.29	10
15	Chris Dobey 87.32	4
7	Danny Noppert 94.85	8
10	Dave Chisnall 97.59	10
3	Michael Smith 95.31	6
14	Dimitri Van den Bergh 90.69	10
6	Rob Cross 99.04	8
11	Damon Heta 102.70	10

Quarter-finals (best of 19 legs); 4 February
16	Stephen Bunting 100.92	10
8	Peter Wright 83.30	2
4	Nathan Aspinall 91.48	10
Alt	Daryl Gurney 92.08	9
2	Michael van Gerwen 102.38	10
10	Dave Chisnall 96.65	4
14	Dimitri Van den Bergh 87.45	10
11	Damon Heta 90.39	7

Semi-finals (best of 21 legs); 4 February
16	Stephen Bunting 99.53	11
4	Nathan Aspinall 91.34	1
2	Michael van Gerwen 99.63	11
14	Dimitri Van den Bergh 91.04	2

Final (best of 21 legs); 4 February
16	Stephen Bunting 102.50	11
2	Michael van Gerwen 98.27	7
