= 2019 European Championship (darts) =

2019 Unibet European Championship

Tournament information
- Dates: 24–27 October 2019
- Venue: Lokhalle
- Location: Göttingen
- Country: Germany
- Organisation(s): PDC
- Format: Legs
- Prize fund: £500,000
- Winner's share: £120,000
- High checkout: 170 (England) Nathan Aspinall (Wales) Gerwyn Price

Champion(s)
- (England) Rob Cross

The 2019 Unibet European Championship was the twelfth edition of the Professional Darts Corporation's European Championship tournament, which saw the top players from the thirteen European tour events compete against each other. The tournament took place from 24–27 October 2019 at the Lokhalle in Göttingen, Germany.

James Wade was the defending champion, after beating Simon Whitlock 11–8 in the 2018 final. However, he was beaten 6–0 by Jonny Clayton in the first round. Clayton posted the 6th highest average in the tournament's history in the process.

Rob Cross won his third major title with an 11–6 win over Gerwyn Price in the final.

== Prize money ==
The 2019 European Championship had a total prize fund of £500,000, an increase of £100,000 from the last staging of the tournament.

The following is the breakdown of the fund:

Position (no. of players)		Prize money (Total: £500,000)
Winner	(1)	£120,000
Runner-up	(1)	£60,000
Semi-finalists	(2)	£32,000
Quarter-finalists	(4)	£20,000
Last 16 (second round)	(8)	£10,000
Last 32 (first round)	(16)	£6,000

== Qualification ==
The 2019 tournament continues the new system in terms of qualification with the two previous editions: The top 32 players from the European Tour Order of Merit, which is solely based on prize money won in the thirteen European tour events during the season, qualifying for the tournament.

As with 2018's tournament, the draw will be done in a fixed bracket by their seeded order with the top qualifier playing the 32nd, the second playing the 31st and so on.

The following players qualified for the tournament:

1. (Netherlands) Michael van Gerwen (first round)
2. (England) Ian White (first round)
3. (Wales) Gerwyn Price (runner-up)
4. (Northern Ireland) Daryl Gurney (semi-finals)
5. (England) Dave Chisnall (quarter-finals)
6. (Austria) Mensur Suljović (first round)
7. (Scotland) Peter Wright (first round)
8. (England) Joe Cullen (second round)
9. (England) Rob Cross (champion)
10. (England) Jamie Hughes (first round)
11. (Poland) Krzysztof Ratajski (first round)
12. (England) James Wade (first round)
13. (England) Adrian Lewis (first round)
14. (England) Nathan Aspinall (second round)
15. (England) Keegan Brown (first round)
16. (England) Glen Durrant (first round)
17. (England) Ricky Evans (quarter-finals)
18. (England) Stephen Bunting (second round)
19. (England) Steve Beaton (first round)
20. (Australia) Simon Whitlock (second round)
21. (Wales) Jonny Clayton (second round)
22. (England) Chris Dobey (second round)
23. (Netherlands) Jermaine Wattimena (second round)
24. (England) Darren Webster (first round)
25. (England) Mervyn King (first round)
26. (Netherlands) Jeffrey de Zwaan (quarter-finals)
27. (Netherlands) Vincent van der Voort (quarter-finals)
28. (Belgium) Dimitri Van den Bergh (first round)
29. (Republic of Ireland) William O'Connor (first round)
30. (England) Ted Evetts (first round)
31. (England) Michael Smith (semi-finals)
32. (England) Ross Smith (second round)

== Draw ==
First round (best of 11 legs); 24–25 October
1	(Netherlands) Michael van Gerwen 105.10	5
32	(England) Ross Smith 98.64	6
16	(England) Glen Durrant 97.37	5
17	(England) Ricky Evans 95.28	6
8	(England) Joe Cullen 92.56	6
25	(England) Mervyn King 88.97	2
9	(England) Rob Cross 99.40	6
24	(England) Darren Webster 93.54	3
5	(England) Dave Chisnall 98.36	6
28	(Belgium) Dimitri Van den Bergh 85.07	3
12	(England) James Wade 82.38	0
21	(Wales) Jonny Clayton 111.33	6
4	(Northern Ireland) Daryl Gurney 98.78	6
29	(Republic of Ireland) William O'Connor 84.55	4
13	(England) Adrian Lewis 91.04	1
20	(Australia) Simon Whitlock 99.82	6
2	(England) Ian White 100.52	1
31	(England) Michael Smith 106.09	6
15	(England) Keegan Brown 89.52	1
18	(England) Stephen Bunting 95.42	6
7	(Scotland) Peter Wright 97.34	4
26	(Netherlands) Jeffrey de Zwaan 101.87	6
10	(England) Jamie Hughes 86.97	1
23	(Netherlands) Jermaine Wattimena 91.51	6
6	(Austria) Mensur Suljović 88.41	1
27	(Netherlands) Vincent van der Voort 94.01	6
11	(Poland) Krzysztof Ratajski 95.71	3
22	(England) Chris Dobey 92.67	6
3	(Wales) Gerwyn Price 100.37	6
30	(England) Ted Evetts 91.06	4
14	(England) Nathan Aspinall 98.35	6
19	(England) Steve Beaton 89.73	3

Second round (best of 19 legs); 25–26 October
32	(England) Ross Smith 94.01	7
17	(England) Ricky Evans 92.22	10
8	(England) Joe Cullen 90.01	7
9	(England) Rob Cross 96.80	10
5	(England) Dave Chisnall 109.75	10
21	(Wales) Jonny Clayton 101.15	4
4	(Northern Ireland) Daryl Gurney 99.64	10
20	(Australia) Simon Whitlock 95.24	7
31	(England) Michael Smith 94.56	10
18	(England) Stephen Bunting 90.75	7
26	(Netherlands) Jeffrey de Zwaan 92.82	10
23	(Netherlands) Jermaine Wattimena 91.23	6
27	(Netherlands) Vincent van der Voort 96.63	10
22	(England) Chris Dobey 94.29	5
3	(Wales) Gerwyn Price 103.85	10
14	(England) Nathan Aspinall 101.88	6

Quarter-finals (best of 19 legs); 27 October
17	(England) Ricky Evans 96.89	6
9	(England) Rob Cross 99.75	10
5	(England) Dave Chisnall 95.14	5
4	(Northern Ireland) Daryl Gurney 97.07	10
31	(England) Michael Smith 94.33	10
26	(Netherlands) Jeffrey de Zwaan 96.97	5
27	(Netherlands) Vincent van der Voort 98.05	8
3	(Wales) Gerwyn Price 96.56	10

Semi-finals (best of 21 legs); 27 October
9	(England) Rob Cross 95.21	11
4	(Northern Ireland) Daryl Gurney 94.56	9
31	(England) Michael Smith 94.41	7
3	(Wales) Gerwyn Price 93.20	11

Final (best of 21 legs); 27 October
9	(England) Rob Cross 93.12	11
3	(Wales) Gerwyn Price 84.51	6
