= Ross Smith (darts player) =

English darts player (born 1989)

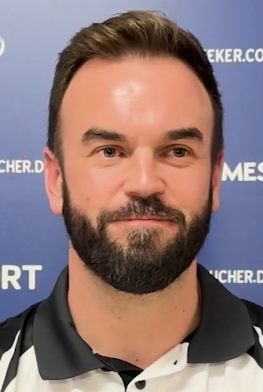
- Smith at the 2025 European Championship

Personal information
- Nickname: "Smudger"
- Born: 12 January 1989 (age 37) Chatham, Kent, England
- Home town: Dover, Kent, England

Sport
- Sport: Darts
- Playing since: 2003
- Darts: 22g Unicorn
- Laterality: Right-handed
- Walk-on music: "Red Light Spells Danger" by Billy Ocean "Go Your Own Way" by Fleetwood Mac

Organisation (see split in darts)
- BDO: 2007–2011
- PDC: 2005–2006; 2012–present (Tour Card: 2012–2016; 2018–)
- Current world ranking: (PDC) 6 (5 November 2026)

WDF major events – best performances
- World Championship: Quarter-final: 2011
- World Masters: Last 40: 2011

PDC premier events – best performances
- World Championship: Last 32: 2022, 2023, 2024
- World Matchplay: Quarter-final: 2024, 2026
- World Grand Prix: Last 16: 2021, 2022, 2023, 2024, 2026
- UK Open: Quarter-final: 2019
- Grand Slam: Last 16: 2022, 2024
- European Championship: Winner (2): 2022, 2026
- PC Finals: Semi-final: 2024
- Masters: Last 16: 2023, 2026
- World Series Finals: Winner (1): 2026

Other tournament wins
- Years
European Tour (×2)
Hungarian Darts Trophy	2026
International Darts Open	2026
Players Championships (×8)
2021, 2023 (×2), 2024, 2025 (×2), 2026 (×2)
PDC Youth Events
PDC Development Tour	2013 (×4)

Ross Smith (born 12 January 1989) is an English professional darts player who competes in Professional Darts Corporation (PDC) events, where he is ranked world number six, his highest ranking to date. Nicknamed "Smudger", he has won 13 PDC titles in his professional career, including three major titles; two European Championships in 2022 and 2026 and the 2026 World Series Finals.

Smith previously competed in British Darts Organisation (BDO) events, reaching the quarter-finals of the 2011 BDO World Darts Championship. He won four titles on the 2013 PDC Challenge Tour (now the PDC Development Tour), the most of any player that year. After claiming his first PDC ranking title at Players Championship 19 in 2021, he won his maiden PDC major title at the 2022 European Championship, defeating Michael Smith 11–8 in the final. He has since won seven more Players Championships and two European Tour titles.

== Career ==
=== Early career ===
Smith began playing in Professional Darts Corporation events in 2005 and made his debut in the Vauxhall Spring Open, reaching the last 16. Smith then reached the final of the WDF Europe Youth Cup, losing to Dutchman Johnny Nijs. Smith had little success afterwards on the PDC circuit and switched to the BDO in 2007.

=== BDO ===
Smith reached the last 16 of the 2008 British Classic and the 2008 Czech Open. He qualified for the 2009 BDO World Darts Championship by winning one of five places in the qualifiers in Bridlington. He gained victories over Stuart Kellet, Kevin Simm and Henny van der Ster before beating Scotland's Don Haughton to qualify. He faced Scott Waites in the first round, losing 3–0. In the 2011 BDO World Darts Championship, he beat Tony O'Shea 3–1 in the first round and Willy van de Wiel 4–1 in the second round, before losing to eventual champion Martin Adams 1–5 in the quarter finals.

=== 2012–2017: Switch to PDC ===
It was announced at the end of the 2012 BDO World Championship that Ross would be one of many players to compete in the rival PDC's 'Q School' the following season. He earned a tour card through the qualifiers Order of Merit. His best result of 2012 came just one week later as he reached the quarter-finals of the second Players Championship and lost to Justin Pipe 6–3. Smith qualified for three of the five new European Tour events, but lost in the first round on each occasion. He came very close to defeating world number 5 Simon Whitlock in the third event, the 2012 European Darts Open as he led 5–2, but went on to lose 6–5.

Smith headed into 2013 ranked world number 79, and reached his first semi-final on the PDC tour in April at the seventh UK Open Qualifier, where he lost 6–3 to John Part. At the UK Open itself, he fought back from 7–4 down in the third round against Jelle Klaasen to level at 7–7, before being edged out 9–7. He threw a nine-dart finish in the second round of the 2013 Gibraltar Darts Trophy against Adrian Lewis, but lost 6–5; this remained the last nine-dart finish achieved on the PDC European Tour until June 2018. Smith won four events on the PDC Challenge Tour during 2013 to top the Order of Merit which has earned him a place in the Grand Slam of Darts and the 2014 World Championship and also a two-year PDC tour card which includes all of his 2014 entry fees. In the Grand Slam he lost each of his three games to Simon Whitlock, Wes Newton and Mark Webster to finish bottom of Group G. He played Whitlock in the first round of the World Championship and was beaten 3–0 in sets.

He began 2014 at 54th place in the rankings meaning he rose 25 positions during the previous year. He lost 9–5 in the third round of the UK Open to Kim Huybrechts. Smith's only quarter-final showing of the year came at the 19th Players Championship where he lost 6–3 to Gerwyn Price. He missed out on qualifying for the 2015 World Championship by just £500 on the Pro Tour Order of Merit.

Smith saw off Kevin Thomas at the German Darts Championship and came from 4–1 behind against Peter Wright in the second round to force a deciding leg in which he missed one match dart to lose 6–5. 2015 proved to be a difficult year for Smith as he could only record one more last 32 finish out of the events he played in. Smith explained that the birth of his child and starting a new job had left him with no time to practise. He fell to 74th on the Order of Merit meaning he needed to enter 2016 Q School. Smith hit a nine darter on the first day and on the final day eliminated seven players, concluding with a 5–4 victory over Mick McGowan to win a new two-year tour card and stated that his goal was to get in the top 40 in the rankings.

He failed to qualify for the 2016 UK Open and reached the last 32 of an event for the only time this year at the fourth Players Championship event by beating Peter Wright and Dennis Smith, before losing 6–2 Rowby-John Rodriguez. He reached the main draw of the Gibraltar Darts Trophy and Austrian Darts Open, but was eliminated in the first round of both. After 2017, during which he took a break from playing darts, he lost his PDC Tour card.

=== 2018–2021 ===
In 2018 he won his Tour card back and in 2019 he reached the world championship where he defeated Paul Lim in the first round, but lost to Daryl Gurney in the second round. He also qualified for the UK Open in 2019 where he reached the quarter finals after defeating Dawson Murschell, Yordi Meeuwisse, Alan Norris, Steve West and James Wade.

In the same year, he also qualified for 2019 European Championship and he defeated in the first round the first seed and the current world number one, Michael van Gerwen 5–6. In the second round he lost to Ricky Evans. For the first time since 2013, he also qualified for 2019 Grand Slam of Darts when he was successful in PDC Qualifying Event. He was unable to win any match in his group that also contained Michael van Gerwen, Adrian Lewis and Jim Williams. For the second time in a row, he also qualified for 2019 Players Championship Finals, but he was eliminated in the first round, losing to Brendan Dolan.

Smith qualified for 2020 PDC World Darts Championship as the 10th highest ranked player via Pro Tour Order of Merit. However, he lost 0–3 to the debutant Ciaran Teehan from Ireland. After the championship, Smith placed 48th in PDC Order of Merit, his highest year end ranking ever, and secured his Tour card for another season. He was seeded into the third round of 2020 UK Open, but lost in his first match against Jamie Lewis 5–6. Even though the European Tour was cut short due to COVID-19, he qualified for 2020 European Championship, but lost in the deciding leg to Michael Smith. Smith had his best run in 2020 Players Championship Finals, reaching the third round after wins over Kim Huybrechts and Nathan Aspinall, before losing to Damon Heta.

At the end of 2020, he qualified for his third world championship in a row, 2021 PDC World Darts Championship, as fourth highest ranked player from Pro Tour Order of Merit. At Players Championship 19 on the 2021 PDC Pro Tour, Smith won his first PDC ranking title by defeating Brendan Dolan 8–4 in the final.

=== 2022: European champion ===
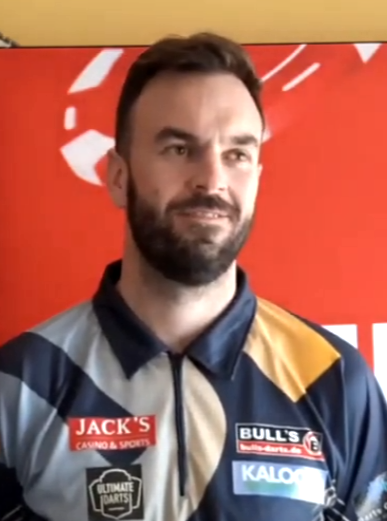
Smith in 2022

At the 2022 World Championship, Smith reached the last 32 of the tournament for the first time, claiming wins over Jeff Smith and Stephen Bunting. In October 2022, Smith reached his first televised major final, defeating Michael Smith 11–8 to win a first major title at the 2022 European Championship. During the group stage of the 2022 Grand Slam of Darts, Smith hit nine 180s in his victory over Michael van Gerwen, a record number for a group stage for the Grand Slam.

=== 2023 ===
Smith was eliminated from the 2023 World Championship in the third round, losing 4–3 to Dirk van Duijvenbode in a sudden death leg, having missed five match darts. The match featured 31 180s, a record for a best-of-seven set match, nineteen of which from Smith which equalled the individual record for a match of this format. Smith won a second PDC Pro Tour title in March 2023 with victory at Players Championship 5, defeating Gary Anderson 8–6 in the final. The win took him into the PDC Order of Merit's top 16 for the first time in his career.

Smith won a second Pro Tour title of the year in October 2023 at Players Championship 28, where he beat Damon Heta 8–6 in the final. In his defence of the European Championship, he lost 6–3 to Ricardo Pietreczko in the first round.

=== 2024–2025 ===
At the 2024 World Championship, 16th seed Smith defeated Niels Zonneveld 3–1 in the second round, but lost 4–2 to Chris Dobey in the third round. At the European Darts Grand Prix, Smith survived ten match darts across the tournament as he reached a first European Tour final, where he lost 8–6 to Gary Anderson. He reached another European Tour final at the European Darts Open, but suffered an 8–6 loss to Dave Chisnall. Smith won his sole title of 2024 at Players Championship 13 in July, defeating Wesley Plaisier 8–7 in the final. Later that month, he reached the quarter-finals of the World Matchplay after an 11–9 second-round victory over Gerwyn Price. He was denied a semi-final by James Wade, who beat him 16–10. At the Players Championship Finals in November, Smith reached his second major semi-final after beating Scott Williams 10–3 in the quarter-finals. In the last four, he lost 11–9 to Luke Littler.

At the 2025 World Championship, Smith suffered a shock exit as he was defeated 3–0 by Paolo Nebrida in the second round. He was a finalist at the Austrian Darts Open in April 2025, losing 8–4 to Martin Schindler. He won a sixth PDC title at Players Championship 16 in May, winning 24 consecutive legs en route to lifting the title as he secured whitewash victories from the quarter-finals onward, beating Brendan Dolan in the final. Smith also became just the third player ever, after Phil Taylor and Michael van Gerwen, to hit multiple nine-dart finishes in the same Players Championship event. He won his second title of the year at Players Championship 29. He was also a quarter-finalist at the World Series Finals.

=== 2026 ===
At the 2026 World Championship, Smith lost his first-round match 3–2 to Andreas Harrysson after missing six match darts. He won his first title of 2026 at Players Championship 5, defeating Chris Dobey 8–2 in the final. Smith reached his fourth European Tour final at the European Darts Grand Prix, but was beaten 8–6 by Gerwyn Price. At the International Darts Open, he reached his fifth European Tour final and won his maiden title, defeating Ryan Searle 8–3 in the final.

In June, Smith won his tenth PDC ranking title at Players Championship 20 by beating William O'Connor 8–5 in the final. Later that month, he was selected for the World Series of Darts for the first time, competing as a PDC representative at the New Zealand Darts Masters and the Australian Darts Masters in August. Following those events, he won his second European Tour title at the Hungarian Darts Trophy, defeating Gary Anderson 8–2 in the final.

In September, Smith won a second PDC major title, defeating Gerwyn Price 11–5 in the final of the 2026 World Series of Darts Finals.

== Personal life ==
Before becoming a professional darts player, Smith worked as a lorry driver. He has a son. He is a supporter of Manchester United and local club Dover Athletic.

== World Championship results ==
=== BDO World Championship ===
- 2009: First round (lost to Scott Waites 0–3)
- 2011: Quarter-finals (lost to Martin Adams 1–5)

=== PDC World Championship ===
- 2014: First round (lost to Simon Whitlock 0–3)
- 2019: Second round (lost to Daryl Gurney 0–3)
- 2020: First round (lost to Ciaran Teehan 0–3)
- 2021: Second round (lost to José de Sousa 1–3)
- 2022: Third round (lost to Dirk van Duijvenbode 3–4)
- 2023: Third round (lost to Dirk van Duijvenbode 3–4)
- 2024: Third round (lost to Chris Dobey 2–4)
- 2025: Second round (lost to Paolo Nebrida 0–3)
- 2026: First round (lost to Andreas Harrysson 2–3)

== Career finals ==
=== PDC major finals: 3 (3 titles) ===
Legend
European Championship (2–0)
World Series Finals (1–0)

Outcome	No.	Year	Championship	Opponent in the final	Score (Note: (l) = score in legs, (s) = score in sets.)	Ref.
Winner	1.	2022	European Championship	Michael Smith	11–8 (l)	
Winner	2.	2026	World Series Finals	Gerwyn Price	11–5 (l)	
Winner	3.	2026	European Championship	Martin Schindler	11–8 (l)	

== Performance timeline ==
=== BDO ===
Tournament	2009	2010	2011
BDO World Championship	1R	DNQ	QF
World Masters	3R	Prel.	4R

=== PDC ===
Tournament	2012	2013	2014	2018	2019	2020	2021	2022	2023	2024	2025	2026
PDC Ranked televised events
World Championship	DNQ		1R	DNQ	2R	1R	2R	3R	3R	3R	2R	1R
World Masters (Note: A non-ranked event until 2025)	Did not qualify								2R	1R	1R	2R
UK Open	Prel.	3R	3R	DNQ	QF	3R	3R	3R	4R	5R	5R	5R
World Matchplay	Did not qualify						1R	DNQ	1R	QF	1R	QF
World Grand Prix	Did not qualify						2R	2R	2R	2R	1R	2R
European Championship	Did not qualify				2R	1R	DNQ	W	1R	1R	2R	W
Grand Slam (Note: A non-ranked event until 2015)	DNQ	RR	DNQ		RR	DNQ		2R	DNQ	2R	DNQ	RR
Players Championship Finals	Did not qualify			1R	1R	3R	2R	2R	2R	SF	2R	
PDC Non-ranked televised events
World Series Finals	Not held			1R	Did not qualify					1R	QF	W
Career statistics
Year-end ranking	92	54	51	62	48	41	33	17	17	21	16	

==== European Tour ====
Season	1	2	3	4	5	6	7	8	9	10	11	12	13	14	15
2012	ADO; 1R	GDC; DNQ	EDO; 1R	GDM; DNQ	DDM; 1R										
2013	UKM; 1R	EDT; 2R	EDO; DNQ	ADO; 3R	GDT; 2R	GDC; DNQ	GDM; 1R	DDM; 2R							
2014	DNQ		GDM; 1R	Did not qualify				EDT; 2R							
2015	GDC; 2R	Did not qualify													
2016	DNQ		GDT; 1R	EDM; DNQ	ADO; 1R	Did not qualify									
2018	Did not qualify						GDT; 2R	DDO; DNP	EDM; DNQ	GDC; 1R	DDC; 3R	IDO; 2R	EDT; DNQ		
2019	EDO; 3R	GDC; DNQ	GDG; 3R	GDO; DNQ	ADO; 1R	EDG; 2R	DDM; 1R	DNQ		ADC; 1R	EDM; 1R	DNQ			
2020	Did not qualify			IDO; QF											
2021	HDT; 2R	GDT; DNQ													
2022	Did not qualify			ADO; 2R	EDO; DNQ	CDO; QF	EDG; DNQ	DDC; 2R	DNQ		GDO; QF	BDO; 2R	GDT; DNQ		
2023	BSD; DNQ	EDO; 3R	IDO; 2R	GDG; 2R	ADO; DNQ	DDC; 2R	BDO; 1R	CDO; 2R	EDG; SF	EDM; 2R	GDO; 2R	HDT; 2R	GDC; 3R		
2024	BDO; 2R	GDG; 3R	IDO; QF	EDG; F	ADO; SF	BSD; 3R	DDC; 2R	EDO; F	GDC; 2R	FDT; 3R	HDT; SF	SDT; 3R	CDO; 2R		
2025	BDO; SF	EDT; QF	IDO; 3R	GDG; QF	ADO; F	EDG; 3R	DDC; 3R	EDO; 2R	BSD; 3R	FDT; 2R	CDO; 3R	HDT; 2R	SDT; WD	GDC; 2R	
2026	PDO; 3R	EDT; 3R	BDO; 3R	GDG; 3R	EDG; F	ADO; 3R	IDO; W	BSD; 2R	SDO; SF	EDO; 3R	HDT; W	CDO; QF	FDT; F	SDT; 3R	DDC; 3R

==== Players Championships ====
Season	1	2	3	4	5	6	7	8	9	10	11	12	13	14	15	16	17	18	19	20	21	22	23	24	25	26	27	28	29	30	31	32	33	34
2012	ALI; 1R	ALI; QF	REA; 1R	REA; 2R	CRA; DNP		BIR; 3R	BIR; 2R	CRA; 1R	CRA; 1R	BAR; 1R	BAR; 2R	DUB; 1R	DUB; DNP	KIL; 1R	KIL; 1R	CRA; 1R	CRA; 2R	BAR; 3R	BAR; 1R														
2013	WIG; 2R	WIG; 1R	WIG; 2R	WIG; 1R	CRA; 2R	CRA; 2R	BAR; 3R	BAR; 1R	DUB; 2R	DUB; 1R	KIL; Prel.	KIL; 2R	WIG; 1R	WIG; 2R	BAR; 3R	BAR; 1R																		
2014	BAR; 1R	BAR; 1R	CRA; 1R	CRA; 2R	WIG; 3R	WIG; 2R	WIG; 2R	WIG; 3R	CRA; 1R	CRA; 1R	COV; 1R	COV; 2R	CRA; 1R	CRA; 1R	DUB; 3R	DUB; 2R	CRA; 4R	CRA; 1R	COV; QF	COV; 4R														
2015	BAR; 2R	BAR; 1R	BAR; 1R	BAR; 1R	BAR; 2R	COV; 2R	COV; 2R	COV; 1R	CRA; 2R	CRA; 3R	BAR; 2R	BAR; 1R	WIG; 1R	WIG; 1R	BAR; DNP		DUB; 1R	DUB; 1R	COV; 1R	COV; 2R														
2016	BAR; 2R	BAR; 2R	BAR; 2R	BAR; 3R	BAR; 1R	BAR; 1R	BAR; 1R	COV; 1R	COV; 1R	BAR; 1R	BAR; 1R	Did not participate								BAR; 2R														
2017 (Note: Not a Tour card holder)	Did not participate								WIG; 1R	Did not participate																								
2018	BAR; 2R	BAR; 2R	BAR; 1R	BAR; 2R	MIL; 1R	MIL; 1R	BAR; 2R	BAR; 1R	WIG; 2R	WIG; 2R	MIL; 3R	MIL; 1R	WIG; 2R	WIG; 3R	BAR; 3R	BAR; 1R	BAR; 4R	BAR; 1R	DUB; 4R	DUB; 1R	BAR; 2R	BAR; 2R												
2019	WIG; 1R	WIG; 1R	WIG; 2R	WIG; 2R	BAR; 4R	BAR; 3R	WIG; 4R	WIG; 1R	BAR; 4R	BAR; 2R	BAR; 2R	BAR; 2R	BAR; 3R	BAR; 2R	BAR; 1R	BAR; 3R	WIG; 2R	WIG; 4R	BAR; 2R	BAR; 1R	HIL; 1R	HIL; 1R	BAR; 2R	BAR; 3R	BAR; 1R	BAR; QF	DUB; 2R	DUB; 1R	BAR; 3R	BAR; 1R				
2020	BAR; 4R	BAR; QF	WIG; 2R	WIG; 3R	WIG; 1R	WIG; 1R	BAR; 1R	BAR; 1R	MIL; 3R	MIL; 1R	MIL; 2R	MIL; 1R	MIL; 2R	NIE; 2R	NIE; 4R	NIE; QF	NIE; QF	NIE; 1R	COV; 2R	COV; 3R	COV; 4R	COV; 2R	COV; 1R											
2021	BOL; 2R	BOL; 2R	BOL; 2R	BOL; 1R	MIL; 1R	MIL; 1R	MIL; 1R	MIL; 2R	NIE; 4R	NIE; F	NIE; 2R	NIE; 1R	MIL; 1R	MIL; 4R	MIL; 1R	MIL; 3R	COV; 3R	COV; 1R	COV; W	COV; 1R	BAR; 3R	BAR; 2R	BAR; 2R	BAR; 2R	BAR; 3R	BAR; 4R	BAR; F	BAR; 3R	BAR; 3R	BAR; 2R				
2022	BAR; 3R	BAR; 1R	WIG; 1R	WIG; 1R	BAR; 2R	BAR; 1R	NIE; 1R	NIE; 1R	BAR; 1R	BAR; 4R	BAR; 1R	BAR; 1R	BAR; 2R	WIG; 4R	WIG; 1R	NIE; 2R	NIE; 4R	BAR; 2R	BAR; 1R	BAR; 2R	BAR; 3R	BAR; 1R	BAR; 1R	BAR; 4R	BAR; 3R	BAR; 1R	BAR; 1R	BAR; QF	BAR; 1R	BAR; 4R				
2023	BAR; 2R	BAR; 2R	BAR; 4R	BAR; 1R	BAR; W	BAR; QF	HIL; 2R	HIL; QF	WIG; 2R	WIG; 1R	LEI; 1R	LEI; 1R	HIL; 1R	HIL; 4R	LEI; 1R	LEI; 1R	HIL; 3R	HIL; 1R	BAR; QF	BAR; 4R	BAR; QF	BAR; 2R	BAR; 4R	BAR; 1R	BAR; 3R	BAR; 2R	BAR; 4R	BAR; W	BAR; 4R	BAR; 4R				
2024	WIG; 3R	WIG; 2R	LEI; 3R	LEI; 1R	HIL; SF	HIL; SF	LEI; SF	LEI; 2R	HIL; 1R	HIL; 2R	HIL; 2R	HIL; 2R	MIL; W	MIL; 2R	MIL; 2R	MIL; 4R	MIL; SF	MIL; QF	MIL; 4R	WIG; 1R	WIG; 2R	LEI; 1R	LEI; 3R	WIG; 4R	WIG; 1R	WIG; 1R	WIG; DNP		LEI; 4R	LEI; 1R				
2025	WIG; 4R	WIG; SF	ROS; 2R	ROS; 1R	LEI; 3R	LEI; SF	HIL; 2R	HIL; 3R	LEI; QF	LEI; 1R	LEI; 2R	LEI; 4R	ROS; 2R	ROS; 3R	HIL; QF	HIL; W	LEI; 3R	LEI; 4R	LEI; 4R	LEI; QF	LEI; 3R	HIL; 2R	HIL; QF	MIL; SF	MIL; 1R	HIL; QF	HIL; 3R	LEI; 4R	LEI; W	LEI; 1R	WIG; 1R	WIG; 2R	WIG; 3R	WIG; 2R
2026	HIL; 2R	HIL; 1R	WIG; 1R	WIG; 4R	LEI; W	LEI; QF	LEI; 2R	LEI; 1R	WIG; 2R	WIG; 2R	MIL; 4R	MIL; 2R	HIL; 3R	HIL; 1R	LEI; 3R	LEI; 1R	LEI; 4R	LEI; 4R	MIL; 4R	MIL; W	WIG; 4R	WIG; 2R	LEI; 1R	LEI; 3R	Did not participate								LEI; 4R	LEI; 1R

==== World Series ====
Tournament	2026
New Zealand Masters	1R
Australian Masters	1R

Performance Table Legend
W	Won the tournament	F	Finalist	SF	Semifinalist	QF	Quarterfinalist	#R; RR; Prel.	Lost in # round Round-robin; Preliminary round	DQ	Disqualified
DNQ	Did not qualify	DNP	Did not participate	WD	Withdrew	NH	Tournament not held	#R; RR; Prel.	Lost in # round Round-robin; Preliminary round	NYF	Not yet founded
