= 2022 European Championship (darts) =

2022 Cazoo European Championship

Tournament information
- Dates: 27–30 October 2022
- Venue: Westfalenhallen
- Location: Dortmund, Germany
- Organisation(s): Professional Darts Corporation (PDC)
- Format: Legs
- Prize fund: £500,000
- Winner's share: £120,000
- High checkout: 170 Damon Heta (first round)

Champion(s)
- Ross Smith

The 2022 Cazoo European Championship was the fifteenth edition of the Professional Darts Corporation's European Championship tournament, which saw the top players from the thirteen European tour events compete against each other. The tournament took place from 27–30 October 2022 at the Westfalenhallen in Dortmund, Germany.

Rob Cross was the defending champion, having won the tournament for the second time with an 11–8 win over Michael van Gerwen in the 2021 final. However, he became the fourth consecutive defending champion to be eliminated in the first round after losing 6–5 to James Wade.

Ross Smith won his first major title, defeating Michael Smith 11–8 in the final.

== Prize money ==
The 2022 European Championship had a total prize fund of £500,000, the same as its previous edition.

The following is the breakdown of the fund:

Position (no. of players)		Prize money (Total: £500,000)
Winner	(1)	£120,000
Runner-up	(1)	£60,000
Semi-finalists	(2)	£32,000
Quarter-finalists	(4)	£20,000
Last 16 (second round)	(8)	£10,000
Last 32 (first round)	16)	£6,000

== Qualification ==
The 2022 tournament continued the established qualification system whereby the top 32 players from the European Tour Order of Merit qualified for the tournament. The Order of Merit is solely based on prize money won in the thirteen European tour events during the season.

As with the previous editions, players were drawn in a fixed bracket by their seeded order with the top qualifier playing the 32nd, the second playing the 31st and so on.

The following players qualified for the tournament:

1. Luke Humphries (quarter-finals)
2. Michael van Gerwen (first round)
3. Peter Wright (quarter-finals)
4. Rob Cross (first round)
5. Damon Heta (first round)
6. Joe Cullen (first round)
7. Dave Chisnall (quarter-finals)
8. Michael Smith (runner-up)
9. Nathan Aspinall (first round)
10. Jonny Clayton (second round)
11. Dimitri Van den Bergh (second round)
12. Danny Noppert (quarter-finals)
13. Dirk van Duijvenbode (semi-finals)
14. Gerwyn Price (first round)
15. José de Sousa (second round)
16. Ryan Searle (second round)
17. Martin Lukeman (first round)
18. Martin Schindler (first round)
19. Rowby-John Rodriguez (second round)
20. Madars Razma (first round)
21. Andrew Gilding (first round)
22. Daryl Gurney (first round)
23. Gabriel Clemens (first round)
24. Josh Rock (second round)
25. Karel Sedláček (first round)
26. Stephen Bunting (first round)
27. Ross Smith (champion)
28. Vincent van der Voort (second round)
29. James Wade (second round)
30. Ryan Meikle (first round)
31. Chris Dobey (semi-finals)
32. Krzysztof Ratajski (first round)

== Draw ==
First round (best of 11 legs); 27–28 October
1	Luke Humphries 102.15	6
32	Krzysztof Ratajski 96.42	4
16	Ryan Searle 102.43	6
17	Martin Lukeman 96.26	5
8	Michael Smith 94.01	6
25	Karel Sedláček 91.18	4
9	Nathan Aspinall 92.20	5
24	Josh Rock 96.61	6
4	Rob Cross 83.85	5
29	James Wade 86.22	6
13	Dirk van Duijvenbode 102.58	6
20	Madars Razma 89.93	3
5	Damon Heta 94.04	2
28	Vincent van der Voort 86.90	6
12	Danny Noppert 99.09	6
21	Andrew Gilding 90.98	3
2	Michael van Gerwen 94.35	5
31	Chris Dobey 100.01	6
15	José de Sousa 105.28	6
18	Martin Schindler 101.15	1
7	Dave Chisnall 107.36	6
26	Stephen Bunting 82.52	0
10	Jonny Clayton 97.69	6
23	Gabriel Clemens 97.15	4
3	Peter Wright 103.41	6
30	Ryan Meikle 96.17	2
14	Gerwyn Price 94.71	4
19	Rowby-John Rodriguez 90.36	6
6	Joe Cullen 94.07	4
27	Ross Smith 101.63	6
11	Dimitri Van den Bergh 101.53	6
22	Daryl Gurney 89.51	2

Second round (best of 19 legs); 29 October
1	Luke Humphries 93.13	10
16	Ryan Searle 90.96	6
8	Michael Smith 106.07	10
24	Josh Rock 101.69	8
29	James Wade 97.70	7
13	Dirk van Duijvenbode 95.06	10
28	Vincent van der Voort 94.45	9
12	Danny Noppert 92.05	10
31	Chris Dobey 95.97	10
15	José de Sousa 92.89	5
7	Dave Chisnall 92.99	10
10	Jonny Clayton 97.29	6
3	Peter Wright 95.72	10
19	Rowby-John Rodriguez 85.74	4
27	Ross Smith 100.75	10
11	Dimitri Van den Bergh 100.89	8

Quarter-finals (best of 19 legs); 30 October
1	Luke Humphries 94.19	7
8	Michael Smith 99.16	10
13	Dirk van Duijvenbode 104.15	10
12	Danny Noppert 89.64	3
31	Chris Dobey 104.63	10
7	Dave Chisnall 98.74	7
3	Peter Wright 96.05	8
27	Ross Smith 95.00	10

Semi-finals (best of 21 legs); 30 October
8	Michael Smith 103.61	11
13	Dirk van Duijvenbode 101.43	7
31	Chris Dobey 94.56	9
27	Ross Smith 95.27	11

Final (best of 21 legs); 30 October
8	Michael Smith 100.47	8
27	Ross Smith 101.32	11
