= Ryan Searle (darts player) =

English darts player (born 1987)

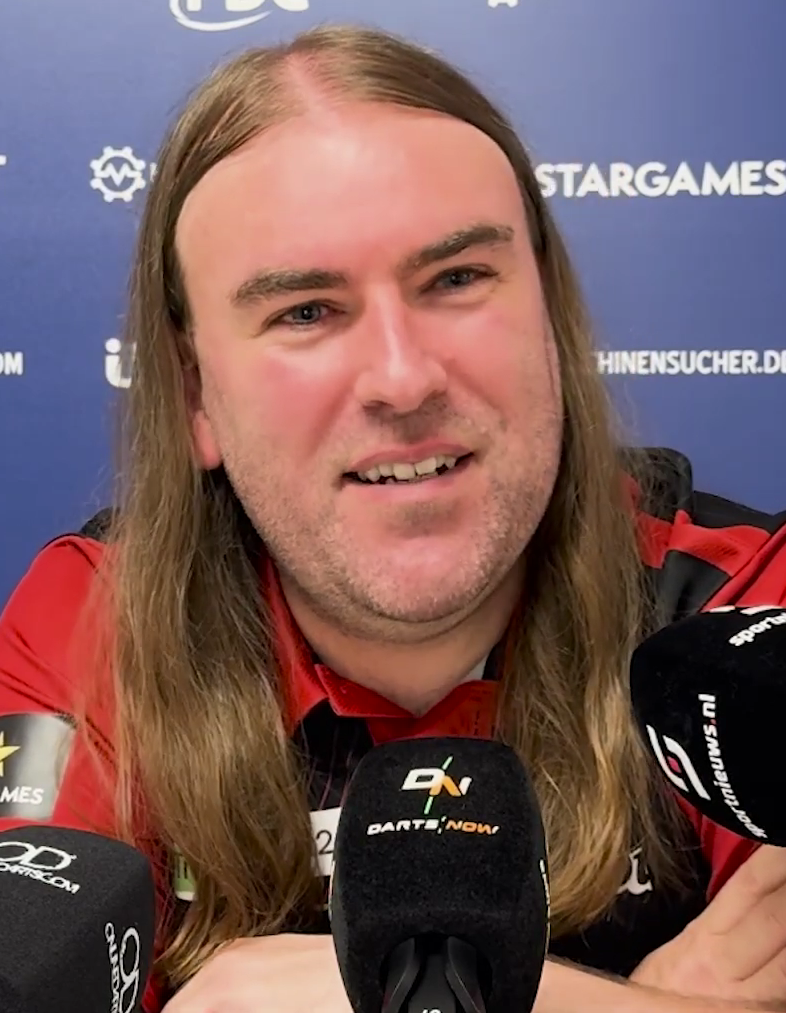
- Searle at the 2025 European Championship

Personal information
- Nickname: "Heavy Metal"
- Born: 21 October 1987 (age 39) Tiverton, Devon, England
- Home town: Holcombe Rogus, Devon, England

Sport
- Sport: Darts
- Darts: 32g Harrows Signature
- Laterality: Right-handed
- Walk-on music: "Paranoid" by Black Sabbath

Organisation (see split in darts)
- BDO: 2011–2016
- PDC: 2016–present (Tour Card: 2017–present)
- Current world ranking: (PDC) 13 ▲2 (22 November 2026)

WDF major events – best performances
- World Masters: Last 16: 2013

PDC premier events – best performances
- World Championship: Semi-final: 2026
- World Matchplay: Quarter-final: 2023
- World Grand Prix: Quarter-final: 2021
- UK Open: Last 16: 2022
- Grand Slam: Last 16: 2023, 2026
- European Championship: Last 16: 2021, 2022, 2024, 2025
- PC Finals: Runner-up: 2021
- Masters: Last 16: 2022, 2025
- World Series Finals: Last 16: 2026

Other tournament wins
- Years
PDC Challenge Tour	2016 (×2)
Players Championships (×8)
2020, 2021, 2022, 2023, 2024, 2025 (×2), 2026

Ryan Searle (born 21 October 1987) is an English professional darts player who competes in Professional Darts Corporation (PDC) events, where he is ranked world number thirteen; he reached a peak ranking of world number eight in 2026. Nicknamed "Heavy Metal", Searle has won eight PDC ranking titles in Players Championship events. He reached his first major final at the 2021 Players Championship Finals, finishing runner-up to Peter Wright. He also reached the semi-finals of the PDC World Championship in 2026, and has reached two finals on the European Tour.

== Career ==
=== Early career ===
Searle began his career competing in British Darts Organisation (BDO) events, where he participated in three World Masters tournaments. He reached the last 16 of the 2013 edition after a controversial win over Richie George, when his winning dart at double 10 did not actually hit the target. Referee Nick Rolls wrongly called 'game shot', ending the leg and awarding Searle the match.

=== 2016–2018 ===
In 2016, Searle won two PDC Challenge Tour events. He finished second on the 2016 Challenge Tour Order of Merit behind Rob Cross, which granted him a PDC Tour Card for the first time. He reached his first PDC ranking final in September 2018, where he lost 6–4 to Nathan Aspinall.

=== 2019–2020 ===
Searle reached the fourth round of the 2019 PDC World Darts Championship on his debut. He defeated Stephen Burton in his opening match, before eliminating seventh seed Mensur Suljović 3–1 in an upset victory; Searle was ranked world number 61. After beating William O'Connor 4–1, he was eliminated by Michael Smith in the fourth round.

At the 2020 World Championship, he reached the third round, where he led Gary Anderson 3–1 but was eventually defeated 4–3. In February 2020, Searle won the first PDC title of his career by beating world number one Michael van Gerwen 8–6 in the final of Players Championship 3.

=== 2021: First major final ===
In 2021, Searle added a second PDC title at Players Championship 22, where he won the final in a deciding leg against Peter Wright. He reached his maiden PDC major quarter-final at the 2021 World Grand Prix, following victories over Dimitri Van den Bergh and Luke Humphries. He lost to Stephen Bunting in the quarter-finals, by a score of 3–1 in sets. Searle competed in his first PDC major final at the 2021 Players Championship Finals. After wins over Daryl Gurney in the quarter-finals and Brendan Dolan in the semi-finals, he took Peter Wright to a deciding leg in the final, but ultimately lost to Wright 11–10.

=== 2022–2025 ===
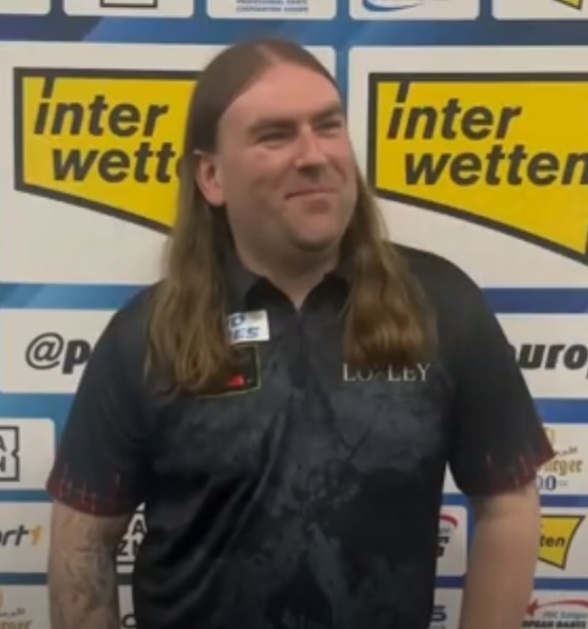
Searle in 2023

In 2022, Searle won his third PDC title at Players Championship 11 with an 8–3 victory over Nathan Aspinall in the final. He claimed another title by winning the final of the opening Players Championship event of 2023, defeating Jamie Hughes 8–4. He reached the quarter-finals of the 2023 World Matchplay for the first time after beating Peter Wright 11–8 in the second round. He then faced Jonny Clayton, but was eliminated in a 16–12 loss. Searle hit his first televised nine-dart finish at the 2023 Grand Slam of Darts in his final group stage match against Nathan Rafferty.

In January 2024, it was announced that Searle had left darts manufacturer Loxley Darts and signed a contract with Harrows Darts. On the 2024 PDC Pro Tour, Searle was runner-up in the opening two Players Championship events of the season, losing to Luke Littler 8–7 and Gary Anderson 8–5 in the respective finals. The following week at Players Championship 3, he defeated Anderson 8–7 in a repeat of the previous event's final. At the 2024 Swiss Darts Trophy, Searle appeared in his first European Tour final, where he faced Martin Schindler. Leading the match 7–4 with one more leg required to win the title, Searle missed seven match darts and allowed Schindler to claim an 8–7 comeback victory.

After winning his opening match of the 2025 World Championship 3–0 against Matt Campbell, Searle was eliminated by Ryan Joyce in the third round. Searle came back from 3–1 down to take the match to a deciding set, where Joyce completed a 4–3 win. Searle won the fourth Players Championship event of 2025 by defeating Cameron Menzies 8–3 in the final. He added a second title at Players Championship 28, beating Mario Vandenbogaerde 8–6 in the final.

=== 2026: World Championship semi-final ===
At the 2026 World Championship, Searle won his first four matches without losing a set, only conceding 11 legs as he progressed to the quarter-finals. He reached his first World Championship semi-final by defeating Jonny Clayton 5–2. Searle won the opening set of his semi-final match against Luke Littler, but went on to lose 6–1. He won his eighth PDC ranking title at Players Championship 7, defeating Alan Soutar 8–3 in the final.

In May, Searle reached his second European Tour final at the International Darts Open, where he was beaten 8–3 by Ross Smith. He was also a finalist at Players Championship 21, losing 8–6 to Wessel Nijman.

== Personal life ==
Searle previously worked as a window cleaner before pursuing darts professionally. He is married and has two children. He is nicknamed "Heavy Metal", in reference to the music genre and the fact he throws 32g darts, known as some of the heaviest darts on the professional tour.

Searle has autosomal dominant optic atrophy (ADOA), a rare hereditary eye condition that causes the optic nerve to become progressively thinner, resulting in reduced visual acuity. He often cannot even see where his darts land and regularly asks referees what he has scored. Searle has said that his daughter is registered as visually impaired. He has spread awareness about the condition and raised money for the Cure ADOA Foundation.

== World Championship results ==
=== PDC World Championship ===
- 2019: Fourth round (lost to Michael Smith 1–4)
- 2020: Third round (lost to Gary Anderson 3–4)
- 2021: Fourth round (lost to Stephen Bunting 3–4)
- 2022: Fourth round (lost to Peter Wright 1–4)
- 2023: Third round (lost to José de Sousa 3–4)
- 2024: Third round (lost to Joe Cullen 2–4)
- 2025: Third round (lost to Ryan Joyce 3–4)
- 2026: Semi-finals (lost to Luke Littler 1–6)

== PDC career finals ==
=== PDC major finals: 1 (1 runner-up) ===
Legend
Players Championship Finals (0–1)

Outcome	No.	Year	Championship	Opponent in the final	Score (Note: (l) = score in legs, (s) = score in sets.)
Runner-up	1.	2021	Players Championship Finals	Peter Wright	10–11 (l)

== Performance timeline ==
=== BDO ===
Tournament	2011	2013	2015
World Masters	1R	6R	3R

=== PDC ===
Tournament	2017	2018	2019	2020	2021	2022	2023	2024	2025	2026
PDC Ranked televised events
World Championship	DNQ		4R	3R	4R	4R	3R	3R	3R	SF
World Masters (Note: A non-ranked event until 2025)	DNQ					2R	1R	1R	2R	1R
UK Open	4R	DNQ	4R	4R	5R	6R	4R	4R	5R	6R
World Matchplay	DNQ				1R	1R	QF	2R	1R	2R
World Grand Prix	DNQ			1R	QF	1R	2R	1R	1R	2R
European Championship	DNQ				2R	2R	1R	2R	2R	1R
Grand Slam	DNQ	RR	DNQ	RR	DNQ	RR	2R	DNQ		2R
Players Championship Finals	1R	2R	1R	2R	F	3R	3R	1R	3R	
PDC Non-ranked televised events
World Series Finals	Did not qualify									2R
Career statistics
Year-end ranking	85	50	52	38	16	15	20	19	8	

==== European Tour ====
Season	1	2	3	4	5	6	7	8	9	10	11	12	13	14	15
2017	GDC; 1R	Did not qualify							DDM; 1R	Did not qualify					
2018	Did not qualify										DDC; 2R	IDO; QF	EDT; DNQ		
2019	Did not qualify				ADO; 2R	EDG; 3R	Did not qualify								
2020	BDC; 2R	Did not qualify													
2021	HDT; DNQ	GDT; 2R													
2022	IDO; 1R	GDC; 3R	GDG; 3R	ADO; 2R	EDO; QF	CDO; 3R	EDG; 3R	DDC; 3R	EDM; 2R	HDT; 2R	GDO; 2R	BDO; 3R	GDT; 3R		
2023	BSD; SF	EDO; 2R	DNQ		ADO; QF	DDC; 3R	BDO; 2R	CDO; 3R	EDG; 2R	EDM; 3R	GDO; 3R	HDT; 2R	GDC; 2R		
2024	BDO; QF	GDG; 3R	IDO; QF	EDG; 2R	ADO; 2R	BSD; QF	DDC; QF	EDO; QF	GDC; 3R	FDT; QF	HDT; SF	SDT; F	CDO; 2R		
2025	BDO; 2R	EDT; 2R	IDO; 1R	GDG; 3R	ADO; 2R	EDG; 1R	DDC; QF	EDO; 2R	BSD; 3R	FDT; 3R	CDO; 3R	HDT; 1R	SDT; QF	GDC; 2R	
2026	PDO; 2R	EDT; 3R	BDO; 3R	GDG; 2R	EDG; 2R	ADO; 2R	IDO; F	BSD; 3R	SDO; 3R	EDO; WD	HDT; 3R	CDO; 2R	FDT; 3R	SDT; 2R	DDC; QF

==== Players Championships ====
Season	1	2	3	4	5	6	7	8	9	10	11	12	13	14	15	16	17	18	19	20	21	22	23	24	25	26	27	28	29	30	31	32	33	34
2017	BAR; 2R	BAR; 2R	BAR; 1R	BAR; 1R	MIL; 1R	MIL; 1R	BAR; DNP		WIG; 2R	WIG; QF	MIL; 4R	MIL; 1R	WIG; 2R	WIG; 2R	BAR; 4R	BAR; 3R	BAR; 2R	BAR; SF	DUB; 4R	DUB; 1R	BAR; 1R	BAR; 2R												
2018	BAR; 1R	BAR; 3R	BAR; 1R	BAR; 2R	MIL; SF	MIL; 1R	BAR; 2R	BAR; 1R	WIG; 1R	WIG; 1R	MIL; 1R	MIL; 1R	WIG; 1R	WIG; 1R	BAR; 1R	BAR; 1R	BAR; 3R	BAR; F	DUB; 1R	DUB; 2R	BAR; 1R	BAR; 1R												
2019	WIG; 3R	WIG; QF	WIG; 1R	WIG; 1R	BAR; QF	BAR; 1R	WIG; QF	WIG; 1R	BAR; 4R	BAR; 3R	BAR; 1R	BAR; 2R	BAR; 3R	BAR; 2R	BAR; 3R	BAR; 1R	WIG; 1R	WIG; 2R	BAR; 2R	BAR; 3R	HIL; 1R	HIL; 3R	BAR; 1R	BAR; 2R	BAR; 1R	BAR; 1R	DUB; 1R	DUB; 1R	BAR; 1R	BAR; 2R				
2020	BAR; 2R	BAR; 3R	WIG; W	WIG; 3R	WIG; 1R	WIG; 1R	BAR; 1R	BAR; 3R	MIL; 3R	MIL; 1R	MIL; 3R	MIL; 2R	MIL; 1R	NIE; 2R	NIE; 3R	NIE; 2R	NIE; SF	NIE; 1R	COV; 1R	COV; 1R	COV; QF	COV; 4R	COV; 1R											
2021	BOL; 3R	BOL; 1R	BOL; 3R	BOL; 3R	MIL; QF	MIL; 3R	MIL; 1R	MIL; 3R	NIE; 1R	NIE; 3R	NIE; 2R	NIE; 4R	MIL; 3R	MIL; 1R	MIL; F	MIL; 1R	COV; 1R	COV; SF	COV; 1R	COV; 4R	BAR; 1R	BAR; W	BAR; QF	BAR; QF	BAR; 4R	BAR; F	BAR; 1R	BAR; F	BAR; QF	BAR; 1R				
2022	BAR; F	BAR; 2R	WIG; 2R	WIG; 1R	BAR; 2R	BAR; 2R	HIL; DNP		BAR; 3R	BAR; 3R	BAR; W	BAR; F	BAR; 2R	Did not participate				BAR; 2R	BAR; SF	BAR; 2R	BAR; 1R	BAR; SF	BAR; 1R	BAR; 1R	BAR; 1R	BAR; 2R	BAR; 1R	BAR; 1R	BAR; 3R	BAR; 2R				
2023	BAR; W	BAR; 1R	BAR; 2R	BAR; F	BAR; 1R	BAR; F	HIL; DNP		WIG; 4R	WIG; 1R	LEI; 1R	LEI; 2R	HIL; DNP		LEI; SF	LEI; 2R	HIL; DNP		BAR; 3R	BAR; 4R	BAR; 4R	BAR; 1R	BAR; 4R	BAR; 3R	BAR; 2R	BAR; 2R	BAR; QF	BAR; DNP	BAR; QF	BAR; 3R				
2024	WIG; F	WIG; F	LEI; W	LEI; 4R	HIL; 2R	HIL; 2R	LEI; 4R	LEI; 2R	Did not participate				MIL; 1R	MIL; 3R	MIL; 2R	MIL; 2R	MIL; QF	MIL; F	MIL; 1R	WIG; QF	WIG; 2R	LEI; DNP		WIG; 3R	WIG; 1R	WIG; 2R	WIG; SF	WIG; 4R	LEI; DNP	LEI; SF				
2025	WIG; 1R	WIG; SF	ROS; 4R	ROS; W	LEI; 3R	LEI; 1R	HIL; 2R	HIL; QF	LEI; 1R	LEI; DNP	LEI; 3R	LEI; 4R	ROS; 1R	ROS; 2R	HIL; 2R	HIL; 4R	LEI; 1R	LEI; 4R	LEI; 1R	LEI; 3R	DNP			MIL; 2R	MIL; 2R	HIL; 1R	HIL; 4R	LEI; W	LEI; 1R	LEI; SF	WIG; DNP		WIG; 1R	WIG; DNP
2026	HIL; 2R	HIL; SF	WIG; DNP		LEI; 4R	LEI; 1R	LEI; W	LEI; 1R	WIG; DNP		MIL; 1R	MIL; 4R	HIL; DNP		LEI; 2R	LEI; 1R	LEI; 4R	LEI; 2R	MIL; DNP		WIG; F	WIG; 4R	LEI; 4R	DNP			LEI; 4R	Did not participate					LEI; 2R	LEI; 1R

Performance Table Legend
W	Won the tournament	F	Finalist	SF	Semifinalist	QF	Quarterfinalist	#R; RR; Prel.	Lost in # round Round-robin; Preliminary round	DQ	Disqualified
DNQ	Did not qualify	DNP	Did not participate	WD	Withdrew	NH	Tournament not held	#R; RR; Prel.	Lost in # round Round-robin; Preliminary round	NYF	Not yet founded

== Nine-dart finishes ==
Ryan Searle televised nine-dart finishes
Date	Opponent	Tournament	Method	Prize
13 November 2023	Nathan Rafferty	Grand Slam	3 x T20; 3 x T20; T20, T19, D12	£10,000
