= Martin Schindler =

German darts player (born 1996)

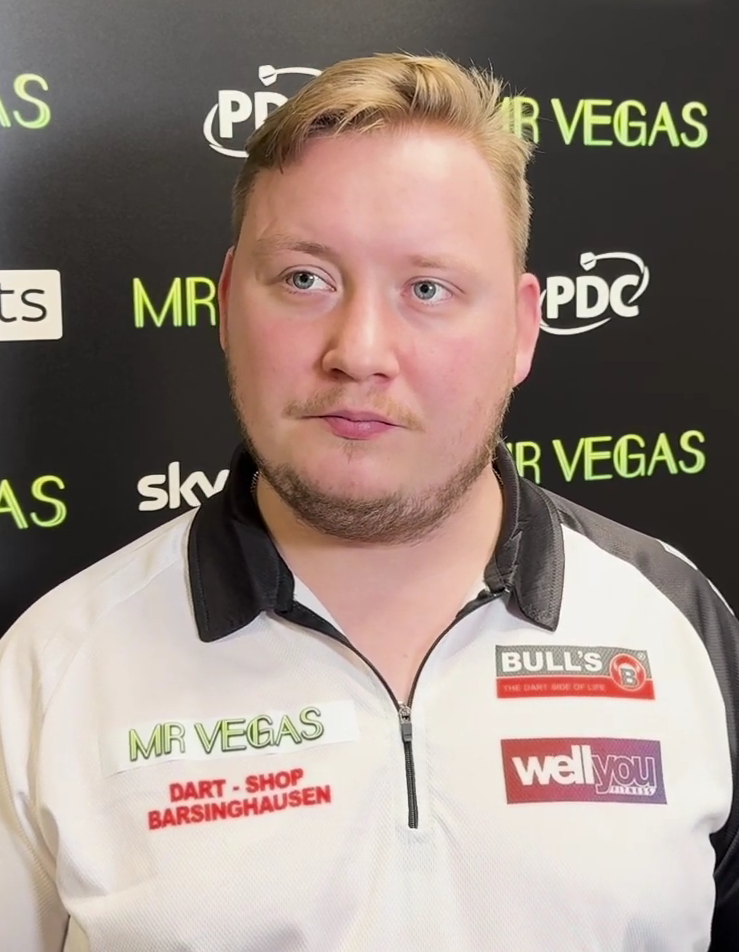
- Schindler at the 2024 Grand Slam of Darts

Personal information
- Nickname: "The Wall"
- Born: 16 August 1996 (age 30) Strausberg, Germany

Sport
- Sport: Darts
- Darts: 23g BEAZD Signature
- Laterality: Right-handed
- Walk-on music: "In the End" by Linkin Park

Organisation (see split in darts)
- BDO: 2014–2015
- PDC: 2015–present (Tour Card: 2017–present)
- Current world ranking: (PDC) 20 (5 November 2026)

WDF major events – best performances
- World Masters: Last 48: 2015

PDC premier events – best performances
- World Championship: Last 32: 2023, 2024, 2026
- World Matchplay: Last 32: 2022, 2023, 2024, 2025, 2026
- World Grand Prix: Quarter-final: 2023
- UK Open: Quarter-final: 2023
- Grand Slam: Last 16: 2025, 2026
- European Championship: Runner-up: 2026
- PC Finals: Last 16: 2022, 2024, 2025
- Masters: Last 24: 2024

Other tournament wins
- Years
PDC Development Tour (×3)	2017, 2018 (×2)
PDC Europe Super League	2021
European Tour Events (×3)
Austrian Darts Open	2025
International Darts Open	2024
Swiss Darts Trophy	2024
Players Championships
2025 PC8

Martin Schindler (born 16 August 1996) is a German professional darts player who competes in Professional Darts Corporation (PDC) events. Nicknamed "the Wall", he has won four PDC ranking titles. He won 2025 Players Championship 8 and has won three PDC European Tours: the International Darts Open and Swiss Darts Trophy in 2024, and the 2025 Austrian Darts Open. In 2025, he became the first German player to reach the top 16 of the PDC World Rankings.

In his youth career, Schindler finished as the runner-up at the 2018 PDC World Youth Championship and won three Development Tours. He became first German player to reach the final of a PDC televised major at the 2026 European Championship. Representing Germany, he reached the semi-finals of the PDC World Cup of Darts in 2023 and 2025, partnering Gabriel Clemens and Ricardo Pietreczko, respectively.

== Career ==
=== 2017 ===
Schindler won a PDC Tour Card at Qualifying School (Q-School) in January 2017. He represented Germany alongside Max Hopp at the 2017 PDC World Cup of Darts, reaching the quarter-finals, before losing to the Dutch pair of Michael van Gerwen and Raymond van Barneveld. In the same year he debuted on a ranking major, playing 2017 European Championship, where he lost to Rob Cross 6–0.

=== 2018 ===
Schindler qualified for the 2018 PDC World Darts Championship and faced Simon Whitlock in the first round, losing 3–1 in sets. After that he made his first appearance at the UK Open, making it to the 4th round at the 2018 edition. Along with Max Hopp he represented Germany at the 2018 PDC World Cup of Darts and once again they made it to the quarter-finals. For the second year in a row he qualified for 2018 European Championship, where he lost to James Wade 6–3 in the first round. Later on in the year he was the runner-up at the 2018 PDC World Youth Championship, losing to Dimitri Van den Bergh 6–3 in the final. Schindler qualified for the 2018 Grand Slam of Darts, and was drawn into Group D with Stephen Bunting, Mensur Suljović and Scott Mitchell. He lost the first two matches, to Bunting 5–3 and to Mitchell 5–1. In the last match he defeated Suljović 5–4 in the deciding leg. He finished bottom in the group in 4th and therefore was eliminated. He made his debut at the 2018 Players Championship Finals, where he lost to Nathan Aspinall 6–1 in the first round.

=== 2019 ===
As he was seventh on the Pro Tour Order of Merit list, Schindler qualified for the 2019 PDC World Championship and faced New Zealand qualifier Cody Harris in the first round, losing 3–2 in sets. At the 2019 UK Open he made it to the fifth round. During the year he struggled to qualify for European Tour events, making only two appearances that year and failed to qualify for the European Championship. Alongside Hopp he again represented Germany at the 2019 PDC World Cup of Darts, losing to Belgium in the second round. Schindler played at the 2019 PDC World Youth Championship, making it to the quarter-finals of the event, losing to Ryan Meikle. As the runner-up at the 2018 PDC World Youth Championship he qualified for the 2019 Grand Slam of Darts, being drawn in the Group H with Michael Smith, Glen Durrant and Nathan Aspinall. He was unable to win any of the three matches, and was eliminated in the round robin. He faced Michael Smith again at the 2019 Players Championship Finals and lost in the first round.

=== 2020 ===
Despite not qualifying for the 2020 PDC World Championship, Schindler was able to secure his Tour card and continued on the Pro Tour. The season was hit by the coronavirus pandemic. Schindler again reached the fifth round at the 2020 UK Open, but was unable to qualify for any other major event that season. He dropped down the rankings and his spot in Germany's World Cup team, his spot being taken by Gabriel Clemens. Schindler made his final appearance at the 2020 PDC World Youth Championship, again reaching the quarter-finals, where he lost to the eventual champion, Bradley Brooks.

=== 2021 ===
After four years on the tour, Schindler lost his Tour Card after the 2021 PDC World Darts Championship, having not qualified. He won his Tour Card immediately back at the 2021 European Q-School via the Order of Merit. He made it to the third round of 2021 UK Open, and qualified for the 2021 Grand Slam of Darts, via the PDC Tour Card Holder Qualifying Event in November. He was drawn into Group A with Gerwyn Price, Nathan Rafferty and Krzysztof Ratajski. He lost his first two matches against Ratajski, 5–1 and Rafferty 5–3. He defeated Price 5–4 in a last-leg decider, but finished bottom in the group in 4th and was eliminated. Schindler secured a first round win at the 2021 Players Championship Finals, defeating Ian White, but lost to Price in the second round.

Schindler then won the 2021 PDC Europe Super League to qualify for the 2022 PDC World Darts Championship.

=== 2022–2023 ===
Schindler played at the 2022 PDC World Championship, but lost to Florian Hempel 3–0 in the first round. At the 2022 UK Open he made it to the fifth round, where he lost to Dirk van Duijvenbode. Later on, he made his debut in two other majors, qualifying for the 2022 World Matchplay and the 2022 World Grand Prix. Schindler returned to the Germany squad for the 2022 PDC World Cup of Darts and partnered Clemens. They made it to the quarter-finals, where they lost to Wales. He qualified for the 2022 European Championship but lost to José de Sousa, who averaged 105.28 to Schindler's 101.15, 6–1 in the first round.

At the 2023 PDC World Cup of Darts, Schindler and Clemens represented Germany once again. This time they reached the semi-finals, where they were defeated by Scotland.

=== 2024 ===
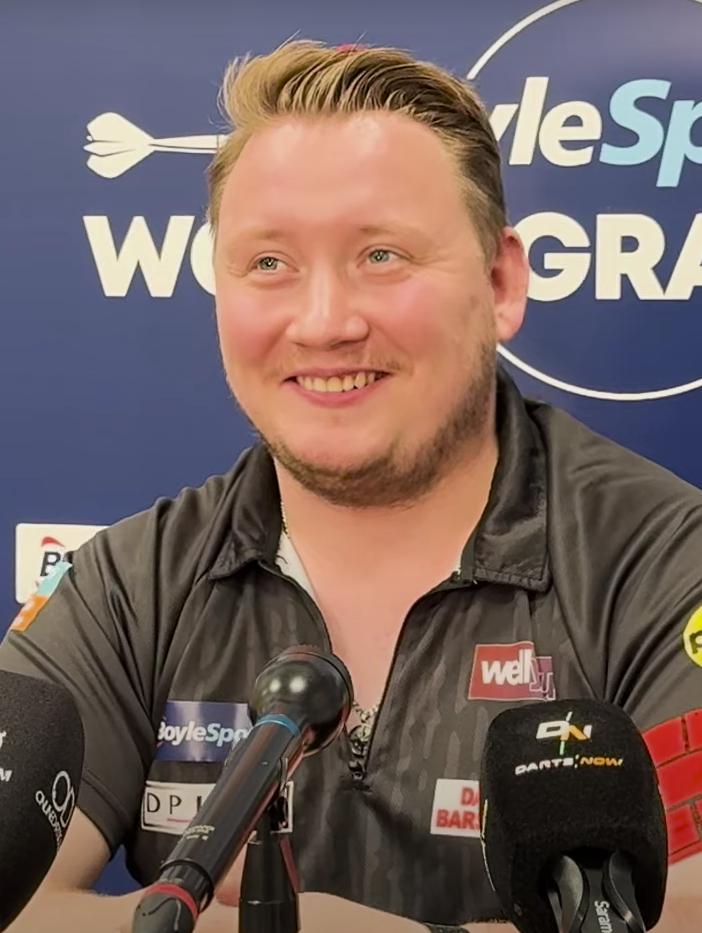
Schindler at the 2024 World Grand Prix

Following a 3–1 victory over Jermaine Wattimena, Schindler lost 4–3 to Scott Williams in the third round of the 2024 World Championship. On the European Tour he won the 2024 International Darts Open, defeating Gerwyn Price 8–5 in the final. This was the first senior PDC title of his career. Schindler achieved victory over Joe Cullen 6–3, before defeating Richard Veenstra 6–1, Danny Noppert 6–5, in a deciding leg, and Chris Dobey 7–3 on his way to final. Schindler was only the third German to win a senior title.

Schindler became the first German to hit a nine-darter on stage during the 2024 Hungarian Darts Trophy. A week later, Schindler won the 2024 Swiss Darts Trophy, defeating Ryan Searle 8–7 in the final. Schindler became the first German to win a second European Tour title and only the ninth player to win two European Tour titles in one season.

=== 2025 ===
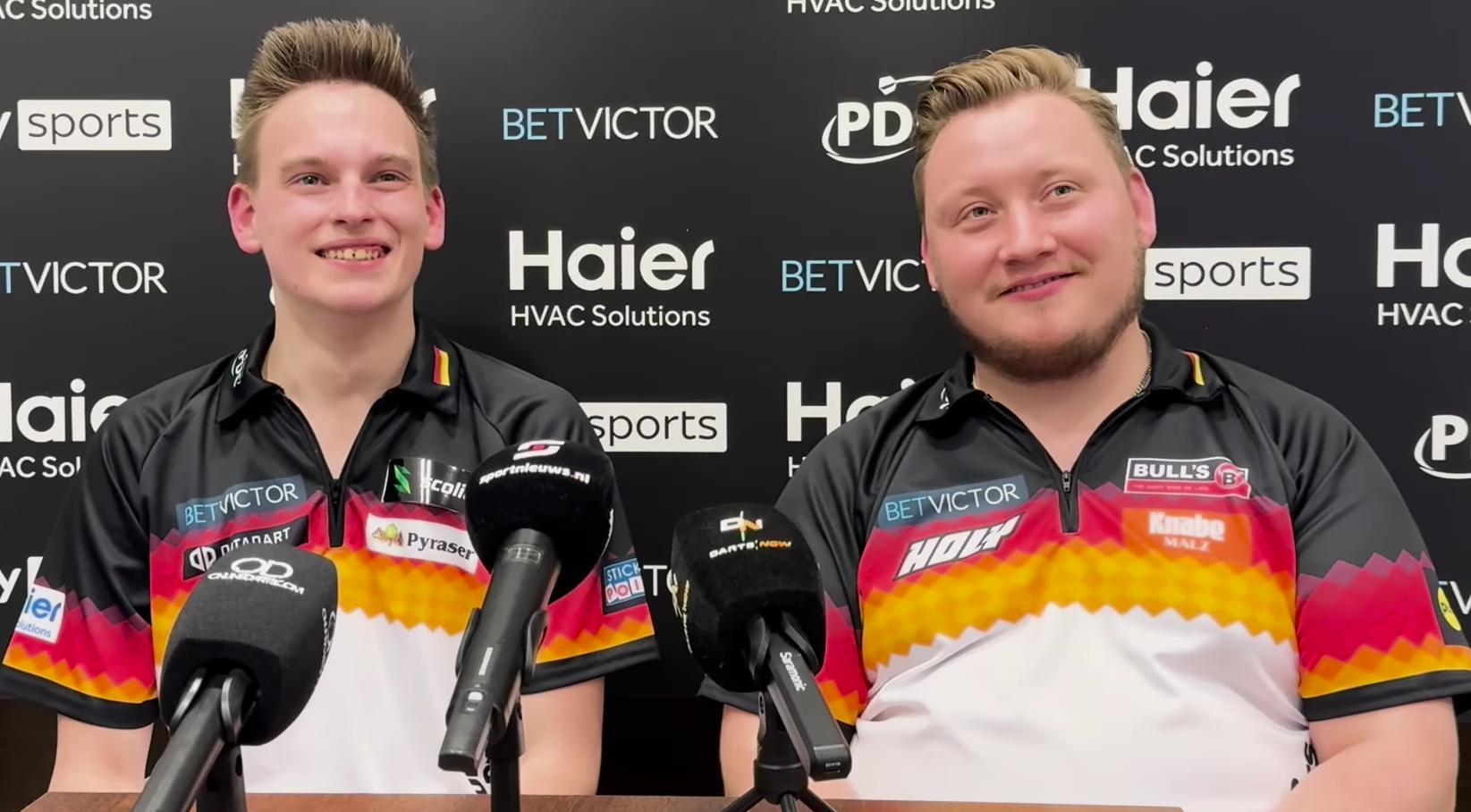
Schindler (right) and his German teammate Ricardo Pietreczko at the 2025 PDC World Cup of Darts

Schindler entered the second round of the 2025 World Championship as the 23rd seed, but lost 3–0 to Callan Rydz. In March, Schindler won his first Players Championship title by defeating Jeffrey de Graaf 8–1 in the final of Players Championship 8. The next month, he won his third European Tour title at the Austrian Darts Open with an 8–4 victory over Ross Smith.

At the World Cup of Darts, representing Germany with tournament debutant Ricardo Pietreczko, the duo produced a shock 8–4 win against defending champions and tournament favourites England in the second round. They reached the semi-finals of the tournament but were eliminated by eventual champions Northern Ireland. In September, Schindler became the first German player to reach the top 16 of the PDC World Rankings.

=== 2026 ===
At the 2026 World Championship, Schindler, the 13th seed, won his opening matches against Stephen Burton and Keane Barry. He was eliminated in the third round, losing 4–0 to Ryan Searle.

Schindler qualified for the European Championship as the 31st seed, and became the first German player to reach a PDC televised major final before losing to Ross Smith 11–8. His appearance in the final qualified him for the Grand Slam.

== World Championship results ==
=== PDC World Championship ===
- 2018: First round (lost to Simon Whitlock 1–3)
- 2019: First round (lost to Cody Harris 2–3)
- 2022: First round (lost to Florian Hempel 0–3)
- 2023: Third round (lost to Michael Smith 3–4)
- 2024: Third round (lost to Scott Williams 3–4)
- 2025: Second round (lost to Callan Rydz 0–3)
- 2026: Third round (lost to Ryan Searle 0–4)

== Performance timeline ==
=== BDO ===
Tournament	2014	2015
BDO Ranked televised events
World Masters	1R	4R

=== PDC ===
Tournament	2014	2015	2016	2017	2018	2019	2020	2021	2022	2023	2024	2025	2026
PDC Ranked televised events
World Championship	Did not qualify				1R	1R	DNQ		1R	3R	3R	2R	3R
World Masters (Note: Before 2025 this was a non-ranked event.)	Did not qualify										1R	1R	1R
UK Open	Did not qualify				4R	5R	5R	3R	5R	QF	5R	6R	5R
World Matchplay	Did not qualify								1R	1R	1R	1R	1R
World Grand Prix	Did not qualify								1R	QF	2R	1R	DNQ
European Championship	Did not qualify			1R	1R	Did not qualify			1R	1R	1R	2R	F
Grand Slam	Did not qualify				RR	RR	DNQ	RR	RR	DNQ	RR	2R	2R
Players Championship Finals	Did not participate			DNQ	1R	1R	DNQ	2R	3R	1R	3R	3R	
PDC Non-ranked televised events
World Cup	Did not qualify			QF	QF	2R	DNQ		QF	SF	2R	SF	QF
World Series Finals	Did not participate			Did not qualify						1R	DNQ	DNP	DNQ
World Youth Championship	2R	DNP	3R	QF	F	QF	QF	Did not participate					
Career statistics
Season-end ranking (PDC)	181	170	NR	65	47	51	67	67	27	23	22	15	

==== European Tour ====
Season	1	2	3	4	5	6	7	8	9	10	11	12	13	14	15
2014	Did not qualify					EDO; 1R	DNQ								
2015	Did not qualify						EDT; 1R	DNQ							
2016	DDM; 1R	Did not qualify				EDO; 1R	IDO; DNQ	EDT; 2R	EDG; 2R	GDC; DNQ					
2017	GDC; 1R	GDM; DNQ	GDO; 1R	EDG; DNQ	GDT; 2R	EDM; 1R	ADO; QF	EDO; 1R	DDM; 3R	GDG; 1R	IDO; 1R	EDT; 2R			
2018	EDO; DNQ	GDG; 1R	DNQ		EDG; 2R	DNQ		DDO; 1R	EDM; 2R	GDC; 3R	DDC; DNQ	IDO; 3R	EDT; 3R		
2019	DNQ		GDG; 1R	Did not qualify				DDO; 2R	Did not qualify						
2020	Did not qualify			IDO; 2R											
2021	HDT; DNQ	GDT; 1R													
2022	IDO; DNQ	GDC; 2R	GDG; QF	ADO; DNQ	EDO; 3R	CDO; 2R	EDG; QF	DDC; 2R	EDM; 2R	HDT; DNQ	GDO; 3R	BDO; QF	GDT; 1R		
2023	BSD; QF	EDO; 2R	IDO; SF	GDG; 2R	ADO; 2R	DDC; 3R	BDO; 3R	CDO; 2R	EDG; QF	EDM; 3R	GDO; 3R	HDT; 3R	GDC; 2R		
2024	BDO; 1R	GDG; SF	IDO; W	EDG; 2R	ADO; QF	BSD; 1R	DDC; SF	EDO; QF	GDC; QF	FDT; 2R	HDT; 3R	SDT; W	CDO; 3R		
2025	BDO; 3R	EDT; 3R	IDO; SF	GDG; 3R	ADO; W	EDG; 3R	DDC; 3R	EDO; 2R	BSD; QF	FDT; 3R	CDO; 3R	HDT; 3R	SDT; 3R	GDC; 3R	
2026	PDO; 2R	EDT; 2R	BDO; 3R	GDG; 3R	EDG; QF	ADO; QF	IDO; 3R	BSD; 2R	SDO; 2R	EDO; 2R	HDT; 1R	CDO; 2R	FDT; 2R	SDT; 2R	DDC; 3R

==== Players Championships ====
Season	1	2	3	4	5	6	7	8	9	10	11	12	13	14	15	16	17	18	19	20	21	22	23	24	25	26	27	28	29	30	31	32	33	34
2017	BAR; 1R	BAR; 2R	BAR; 4R	BAR; 1R	MIL; 1R	MIL; 1R	BAR; 1R	BAR; 2R	WIG; 1R	WIG; 1R	MIL; 1R	MIL; 1R	WIG; 1R	WIG; 3R	BAR; 1R	BAR; 1R	BAR; 1R	BAR; 1R	DUB; 2R	DUB; 1R	BAR; 4R	BAR; 1R												
2018	BAR; 1R	BAR; 2R	BAR; 1R	BAR; 1R	MIL; 1R	MIL; 1R	BAR; 1R	BAR; 2R	WIG; 1R	WIG; QF	MIL; 2R	MIL; 1R	WIG; 4R	WIG; 3R	BAR; 2R	BAR; 1R	BAR; SF	BAR; 1R	DUB; 1R	DUB; 3R	BAR; SF	BAR; 2R												
2019	WIG; 1R	WIG; 1R	WIG; 3R	WIG; 1R	BAR; 2R	BAR; 1R	WIG; 1R	WIG; 4R	BAR; 1R	BAR; 1R	BAR; 1R	BAR; 1R	BAR; 1R	BAR; 2R	BAR; 1R	BAR; 2R	WIG; 1R	WIG; 3R	BAR; 4R	BAR; 1R	HIL; 2R	HIL; 2R	BAR; QF	BAR; 2R	BAR; 1R	BAR; 4R	DUB; 3R	DUB; 2R	BAR; 1R	BAR; 3R				
2020	BAR; 1R	BAR; 2R	WIG; 1R	WIG; 2R	WIG; 1R	WIG; 1R	BAR; 1R	BAR; 1R	MIL; 1R	MIL; 2R	MIL; 2R	MIL; 1R	MIL; 1R	NIE; 2R	NIE; QF	NIE; 1R	NIE; 2R	NIE; 1R	COV; 3R	COV; 1R	COV; 2R	COV; 1R	COV; 1R											
2021	BOL; 1R	BOL; 4R	BOL; 1R	BOL; 2R	MIL; 2R	MIL; 1R	MIL; 1R	MIL; QF	NIE; 2R	NIE; QF	NIE; 1R	NIE; 3R	MIL; 3R	MIL; 1R	MIL; 2R	MIL; 2R	COV; 1R	COV; 1R	COV; 4R	COV; 4R	BAR; 3R	BAR; QF	BAR; QF	BAR; 4R	BAR; 4R	BAR; 3R	BAR; 4R	BAR; 3R	BAR; 1R	BAR; 4R				
2022	BAR; 2R	BAR; 4R	WIG; 2R	WIG; 1R	BAR; 3R	BAR; SF	NIE; 1R	NIE; F	BAR; 2R	BAR; 3R	BAR; 2R	BAR; 3R	BAR; 1R	WIG; 2R	WIG; 2R	NIE; 3R	NIE; 3R	BAR; 2R	BAR; 2R	BAR; SF	BAR; 1R	BAR; 4R	BAR; 2R	BAR; SF	BAR; 3R	BAR; 1R	BAR; 2R	BAR; 3R	BAR; QF	BAR; SF				
2023	BAR; 1R	BAR; 1R	BAR; 2R	BAR; 4R	BAR; SF	BAR; 2R	HIL; 2R	HIL; 1R	WIG; QF	WIG; QF	LEI; 2R	LEI; 2R	HIL; 2R	HIL; 2R	LEI; 3R	LEI; 4R	HIL; 1R	HIL; 1R	BAR; 1R	BAR; 2R	BAR; 4R	BAR; 3R	BAR; 3R	BAR; 1R	BAR; 3R	BAR; 1R	BAR; 2R	BAR; 4R	BAR; 2R	BAR; 1R				
2024	WIG; 2R	WIG; 1R	LEI; 2R	LEI; 2R	HIL; 1R	HIL; 4R	LEI; 1R	LEI; 3R	HIL; DNP		HIL; 2R	HIL; 1R	MIL; 2R	MIL; QF	MIL; 2R	MIL; 2R	MIL; 2R	MIL; 3R	MIL; 3R	WIG; 1R	WIG; 1R	LEI; 3R	LEI; SF	WIG; DNP			WIG; 4R	WIG; 1R	LEI; 3R	LEI; 4R				
2025	WIG; 1R	WIG; 4R	ROS; 2R	ROS; 3R	LEI; 2R	LEI; 1R	HIL; 2R	HIL; W	LEI; 2R	LEI; QF	LEI; DNP		ROS; QF	ROS; 4R	HIL; 3R	HIL; 4R	LEI; 1R	LEI; 3R	LEI; 2R	LEI; 1R	LEI; 2R	HIL; 1R	HIL; 3R	MIL; 3R	MIL; SF	HIL; 4R	HIL; 4R	LEI; 1R	LEI; 4R	LEI; 2R	WIG; 4R	WIG; 1R	WIG; 1R	WIG; 3R
2026	HIL; 1R	HIL; 2R	WIG; DNP		LEI; 2R	LEI; 3R	LEI; 1R	LEI; 3R	WIG; 1R	WIG; 1R	MIL; 1R	MIL; 1R	HIL; 3R	HIL; 3R	LEI; SF	LEI; 1R	LEI; 1R	LEI; 2R	MIL; 2R	MIL; 3R	WIG; 1R	WIG; 3R	LEI; 1R	LEI; 1R	HIL; 1R	HIL; 3R	LEI; 3R	LEI; 3R	ROS; 1R	ROS; 4R	ROS; 4R	ROS; 3R	LEI; 1R	LEI; 2R

Performance Table Legend
W	Won the tournament	F	Finalist	SF	Semifinalist	QF	Quarterfinalist	#R; RR; Prel.	Lost in # round Round-robin; Preliminary round	DQ	Disqualified
DNQ	Did not qualify	DNP	Did not participate	WD	Withdrew	NH	Tournament not held	#R; RR; Prel.	Lost in # round Round-robin; Preliminary round	NYF	Not yet founded
