= 2023 Masters (darts) =

Eleventh staging of the Masters darts tournament of the PDC

2023 Cazoo Masters

Tournament information
- Dates: 27–29 January 2023
- Venue: Arena MK
- Location: Milton Keynes, England
- Organisation(s): Professional Darts Corporation (PDC)
- Format: Legs; Final: best of 21 legs
- Prize fund: £275,000
- Winner's share: £65,000
- High checkout: 170 Gerwyn Price

Champion(s)
- Chris Dobey (ENG)

The 2023 PDC Masters (known for sponsorship reasons as the 2023 Cazoo Masters) was the eleventh staging of the non-ranking Masters darts tournament, held by the Professional Darts Corporation. It was held from 27 to 29 January 2023 at Arena MK in Milton Keynes, England.

Joe Cullen was the defending champion after beating Dave Chisnall 11–9 in the 2022 final, but he lost to Chris Dobey 6–4 in the first round.

Chris Dobey won his first televised title, defeating Rob Cross 11–7 in the final.

The second-round match between Rob Cross and Gary Anderson produced the highest losing and highest combined average in Masters history, with Cross' setting the 2nd highest average at the tournament so far.

== Qualifiers ==
The Masters featured the top 24 players in the PDC Order of Merit after the 2023 PDC World Darts Championship, with the top 8 automatically qualifying for the second round.

Danny Noppert, Damon Heta, Ross Smith, and Callan Rydz made their debuts in the event.

The following players took part in the tournament:

1. Michael Smith (semi-finals)
2. Peter Wright (semi-finals)
3. Michael van Gerwen (quarter-finals)
4. Gerwyn Price (second round)
5. Luke Humphries (second round)
6. Rob Cross (runner-up)
7. Jonny Clayton (quarter-finals)
8. Danny Noppert (quarter-finals)
9. Nathan Aspinall (first round)
10. James Wade (second round)
11. Dimitri Van den Bergh (first round)
12. Joe Cullen (first round)
13. Dirk van Duijvenbode (quarter-finals)
14. José de Sousa (second round)
15. Ryan Searle (first round)
16. Damon Heta (first round)
17. Ross Smith (second round)
18. Dave Chisnall (second round)
19. Gabriel Clemens (first round)
20. Krzysztof Ratajski (first round)
21. Chris Dobey (champion)
22. Gary Anderson (second round)
23. Callan Rydz (first round)
24. Stephen Bunting (second round)

== Prize money ==
The prize money was increased from £220,000 to £275,000 in total, with the winner earning £65,000.

| Stage (no. of players) | | Prize money (Total: £275,000) |
|---|---|---|
| Winner | (1) | £65,000 |
| Runner-up | (1) | £30,000 |
| Semi-finalists | (2) | £20,000 |
| Quarter-finalists | (4) | £12,000 |
| Second round losers | (8) | £7,500 |
| First round losers | (8) | £4,000 |

== Draw ==
The schedule was confirmed on 18 January.

First round (best of 11 legs); 27 January
16 | Damon Heta 86.50 | 5
17 | Ross Smith 88.72 | 6
9 | Nathan Aspinall 92.67 | 5
24 | Stephen Bunting 93.66 | 6
13 | Dirk van Duijvenbode 92.01 | 6
20 | Krzysztof Ratajski 83.58 | 3
12 | Joe Cullen 95.17 | 4
21 | Chris Dobey 96.89 | 6
15 | Ryan Searle 92.01 | 5
18 | Dave Chisnall 95.62 | 6
10 | James Wade 98.82 | 6
23 | Callan Rydz 93.38 | 2
14 | José de Sousa 89.18 | 6
19 | Gabriel Clemens 88.82 | 4
11 | Dimitri Van den Bergh 90.37 | 4
22 | Gary Anderson 92.10 | 6

Second round (best of 19 legs); 28 January
1 | Michael Smith 98.72 | 10
17 | Ross Smith 91.09 | 7
8 | Danny Noppert 95.65 | 10
24 | Stephen Bunting 99.92 | 9
4 | Gerwyn Price 95.26 | 8
13 | Dirk van Duijvenbode 96.28 | 10
5 | Luke Humphries 95.66 | 8
21 | Chris Dobey 94.56 | 10
2 | Peter Wright 101.56 | 10
18 | Dave Chisnall 94.32 | 7
7 | Jonny Clayton 99.68 | 10
10 | James Wade 90.16 | 3
3 | Michael van Gerwen 104.74 | 10
14 | José de Sousa 95.64 | 7
6 | Rob Cross 112.32 | 10
22 | Gary Anderson 111.17 | 6

Quarter-finals (best of 19 legs); 29 January
1 | Michael Smith 103.33 | 10
8 | Danny Noppert 97.13 | 5
13 | Dirk van Duijvenbode 94.58 | 5
21 | Chris Dobey 94.88 | 10
2 | Peter Wright 101.80 | 10
7 | Jonny Clayton 97.87 | 6
3 | Michael van Gerwen 99.02 | 7
6 | Rob Cross 96.02 | 10

Semi-finals (best of 21 legs); 29 January
1 | Michael Smith 90.02 | 7
21 | Chris Dobey 95.05 | 11
2 | Peter Wright 97.07 | 10
6 | Rob Cross 98.91 | 11

Final (best of 21 legs); 29 January
21 | Chris Dobey 94.05 | 11
6 | Rob Cross 90.20 | 7
