= European Championship (darts) =

Tournament information
- Venue: Westfalenhallen
- Location: Dortmund, Germany
- Established: 2008
- Organisation(s): PDC
- Format: Legs
- Prize fund: £600,000 (2023)
- Month(s) Played: Various (2008–2013); October/November (2014–)

Current champion(s)
- (England) Ross Smith

The European Championship is a PDC darts tournament which was created to allow the top European players to compete with the highest ranked players from the PDC Order of Merit. Since 2016, the tournament has taken place at the end of October, and features the top 32 players on the PDC European Tour Order of Merit.

== History ==
The inaugural tournament – the 2008 European Championship – was held at the Südbahnhof in Frankfurt, Germany and featured a prize fund of £200,000.

The tournament moved to the Claus Hotel & Event Center in Hoofddorp, Netherlands for 2009 featuring a similar prize fund. The tournament returned to Germany in 2010, where it was held at Dinslaken. The 2011 tournament remained in Germany, only this time, it took place in Düsseldorf – the capital of North Rhine-Westphalia. From 2012 to 2014, the tournament took place in Mülheim, Germany, then between 2015 and 2017, the tournament took place in Hasselt, Belgium, but in 2018, the tournament returned to Germany, moving to the Westfalenhallen in Dortmund. It moved to Göttingen in 2019, before moving to the König Pilsener Arena in Oberhausen in 2020, and then the Salzburgarena in Salzburg, Austria in 2021, before returning to Dortmund again in 2022.

Phil Taylor won the tournament on each of the first four stagings of the event, before Simon Whitlock took the title in 2012. Adrian Lewis gained his third major win after beating Whitlock in the 2013 edition of the tournament. Michael van Gerwen won the tournament for the first time in 2014 beating Terry Jenkins in the final. In 2015, van Gerwen came back from 7–10 behind to defeat Gary Anderson 11–10 in the final, then he beat Mensur Suljović 11–1 in the 2016 final, and he won it for a fourth year in a row in 2017, when he defeated Rob Cross 11–7 in the 2017 final. In 2018, James Wade won the title, and in 2019 Rob Cross became European champion, then Peter Wright won in 2020, before Cross regained the title in 2021.

== Finals ==
Year	Champion (average in final)	Score	Runner-up (average in final)	Prize money			Venue
Year	Champion (average in final)	Score	Runner-up (average in final)	Total	Champion	Runner-up	Venue
2008	(England) Phil Taylor (104.35)	11–5	(England) Adrian Lewis (96.56)	£200,000	£50,000	£25,000	(Germany) Südbahnhof, Frankfurt
2009	(England) Phil Taylor (109.35)	11–3	(England) Steve Beaton (97.16)	£200,000	£50,000	£20,000	(Netherlands) Claus Event Center, Hoofddorp
2010	(England) Phil Taylor (105.74)	11–1	(England) Wayne Jones (94.64)	£200,000	£50,000	£20,000	(Germany) Stadthalle Dinslaken, Dinslaken
2011	(England) Phil Taylor (109.29)	11–8	(England) Adrian Lewis (98.72)	£200,000	£50,000	£20,000	(Germany) Maritim Hotel, Düsseldorf
2012	(Australia) Simon Whitlock (94.91)	11–5	(England) Wes Newton (89.47)	£200,000	£50,000	£20,000	(Germany) RWE-Sporthalle, Mülheim
2013	(England) Adrian Lewis (103.34)	11–6	(Australia) Simon Whitlock (99.59)	£200,000	£50,000	£20,000	(Germany) RWE-Sporthalle, Mülheim
2014	(Netherlands) Michael van Gerwen (98.16)	11–4	(England) Terry Jenkins (92.90)	£250,000	£55,000	£25,000	(Germany) RWE-Sporthalle, Mülheim
2015	(Netherlands) Michael van Gerwen (107.28)	11–10	(Scotland) Gary Anderson (102.42)	£300,000	£65,000	£35,000	(Belgium) Ethias Arena, Hasselt
2016	(Netherlands) Michael van Gerwen (111.62)	11–1	(Austria) Mensur Suljović (85.91)	£400,000	£100,000	£40,000	(Belgium) Ethias Arena, Hasselt
2017	(Netherlands) Michael van Gerwen (108.91)	11–7	(England) Rob Cross (102.39)	£400,000	£100,000	£40,000	(Belgium) Ethias Arena, Hasselt
2018	(England) James Wade (91.44)	11–8	(Australia) Simon Whitlock (88.81)	£400,000	£100,000	£40,000	(Germany) Westfalenhallen, Dortmund
2019	(England) Rob Cross (93.12)	11–6	(Wales) Gerwyn Price (84.51)	£500,000	£120,000	£60,000	(Germany) Lokhalle, Göttingen
2020	(Scotland) Peter Wright (104.33)	11–4	(England) James Wade (95.28)	£500,000	£120,000	£60,000	(Germany) König Pilsener Arena, Oberhausen
2021	(England) Rob Cross (92.91)	11–8	(Netherlands) Michael van Gerwen (93.66)	£500,000	£120,000	£60,000	(Austria) Salzburgarena, Salzburg
2022	(England) Ross Smith (101.32)	11–8	(England) Michael Smith (100.47)	£500,000	£120,000	£60,000	(Germany) Westfalenhallen, Dortmund
2023	(Scotland) Peter Wright (97.39)	11–6	(England) James Wade (92.09)	£600,000	£120,000	£60,000	(Germany) Westfalenhallen, Dortmund
2024	(England) Ritchie Edhouse (90.55)	11–3	(Netherlands) Jermaine Wattimena (84.64)	£600,000	£120,000	£60,000	(Germany) Westfalenhallen, Dortmund
2025	(Netherlands) Gian van Veen (101.00)	11–10	(England) Luke Humphries (95.24)	£600,000	£120,000	£60,000	(Germany) Westfalenhallen, Dortmund
2026	(England) Ross Smith (92.92)	11–8	(Germany) Martin Schindler (91.49)	£750,000	£150,000	£80,000	(Germany) Westfalenhallen, Dortmund

== Records and statistics ==
As of 25 October 2026.

=== Total finalist appearances ===
Rank	Player	Won	Runner-up	Finals	Appearances
1	(Netherlands) **Michael van Gerwen**	4	1	5	18
2	(England) Phil Taylor	4	0	4	9
3	(England) **Rob Cross**	2	1	3	10
4	(England) **Ross Smith**	2	0	2	7
4	(Scotland) **Peter Wright**	2	0	2	14
6	(Australia) **Simon Whitlock**	1	2	3	11
6	(England) **James Wade**	1	2	3	17
6	(England) Adrian Lewis	1	2	3	10
9	(England) **Ritchie Edhouse**	1	0	1	2
9	(Netherlands) **Gian van Veen**	1	0	1	3
11	(England) Steve Beaton	0	1	1	5
11	(England) Wayne Jones	0	1	1	4
11	(England) Wes Newton	0	1	1	6
11	(England) Terry Jenkins	0	1	1	9
11	(Scotland) **Gary Anderson**	0	1	1	8
11	(Austria) **Mensur Suljović**	0	1	1	13
11	(Wales) **Gerwyn Price**	0	1	1	11
11	(England) **Michael Smith**	0	1	1	11
11	(Germany) **Martin Schindler**	0	1	1	7
11	(Netherlands) **Jermaine Wattimena**	0	1	1	6
11	(England) **Luke Humphries**	0	1	1	5

- Active players are shown in **bold**
- Only players who reached the final are included
- In the event of identical records, players are sorted by date first achieved

=== Champions by country ===
Country	Players	Total	First title	Last title
England	6	11	2008	2026
Netherlands	2	5	2014	2025
Scotland	1	2	2020	2023
Australia	1	1	2012	2012

=== Nine-dart finishes ===
Five nine-darters have been thrown at the European Championship. The first one was in 2011.

Player	Year (+ Round)	Method	Opponent	Result
(England) Adrian Lewis	2011, Semi-Final	3 x T20; 3 x T20; T20, T19, D12	(Netherlands) Raymond van Barneveld	11–10
(Netherlands) Michael van Gerwen	2014, Semi-Final	2 x T20, T19; 3 x T20; 2 x T20, D12	(Netherlands) Raymond van Barneveld	11–6
(Australia) Kyle Anderson	2017, Semi-Final	3 x T20; 3 x T20, T20, T19, D12	(Netherlands) Michael van Gerwen	10–11
(Portugal) José de Sousa	2020, Last 32	3 x T20; 2 x T20, T19; 2 x T20, D12	(Netherlands) Jeffrey de Zwaan	6–3
(England) Luke Woodhouse	2026, Last 32	3 x T20; 3 x T20; T20, T19, D12	(Netherlands) Dirk van Duijvenbode	6–3

=== High averages ===
Ten highest European Championship one-match averages
Average	Player	Year (+ Round)	Opponent	Result
118.14	(England) Phil Taylor	2009, Quarter-Final	(Scotland) Gary Anderson	10–3
114.47	(England) Luke Littler	2026, Last 16	(England) Nathan Aspinall	10–5
113.92	(England) Phil Taylor	2008, Last 16	(England) Mervyn King	9–3
113.33	(England) Phil Taylor	2008, Semi-Final	(Scotland) Robert Thornton	11–7
113.04	(Netherlands) Raymond van Barneveld	2012, Last 32	(England) Terry Jenkins	6–1
111.62	(Netherlands) Michael van Gerwen	2016, Final	(Austria) Mensur Suljović	11–1
111.33	(Wales) Jonny Clayton	2019, Last 32	(England) James Wade	6–0
111.03	(England) Phil Taylor	2009, Last 32	(Netherlands) Toon Greebe	6–2
111.00	(Netherlands) Michael van Gerwen	2014, Quarter-Final	(England) Dave Chisnall	10–5
110.88	(England) Phil Taylor	2009, Last 16	(Scotland) Robert Thornton	9–0

Five highest losing averages
Average	Player	Year (+ Round)	Opponent	Result
109.20	(England) Stephen Bunting	2025, Last 32	(England) Chris Dobey	3–6
107.56	(Wales) Gerwyn Price	2021, Quarter-Final	(Netherlands) Michael van Gerwen	8–10
106.12	(Scotland) Gary Anderson	2009, Quarter-Final	(England) Phil Taylor	3–10
106.12	(England) Phil Taylor	2015, Quarter-Final	(England) Adrian Lewis	9–10
105.57	(England) Nathan Aspinall	2026, Last 16	(England) Luke Littler	5–10

Different players with a 100+ match average (Updated 25/10/26)
Player	Total	Highest Av.	Year (+ Round)
(Netherlands) Michael van Gerwen	31	111.62	2016, Final
(England) Phil Taylor	26	118.14	2009, Quarter-Final
(Scotland) Peter Wright	14	104.74	2015, Semi-Final
(Wales) Gerwyn Price	9	107.56	2021, Quarter-Final
(England) Adrian Lewis	8	108.62	2008, Quarter-Final
(Netherlands) Danny Noppert	8	104.88	2025, Last 32
(Netherlands) Raymond van Barneveld	7	113.04	2012, Last 32
(England) Dave Chisnall	6	109.75	2019, Last 16
(Scotland) Gary Anderson	6	106.26	2015, Semi-Final
(England) Michael Smith	6	106.09	2019, Last 32
(England) Nathan Aspinall	6	105.57	2026, Last 16
(England) Luke Humphries	5	109.98	2025, Last 32
(England) Stephen Bunting	5	109.20	2025, Last 32
(Wales) Jonny Clayton	4	111.33	2019, Last 32
(England) Ross Smith	4	107.00	2026, Quarter-Final
(England) Chris Dobey	4	105.76	2025, Last 32
(Germany) Martin Schindler	4	104.05	2025, Last 32
(England) Mervyn King	4	104.00	2009, Last 16
(England) Colin Lloyd	4	104.00	2009, Last 16
(England) Ryan Searle	4	102.43	2022, Last 32
(Netherlands) Gian van Veen	3	109.92	2025, Last 16
(Netherlands) Jermaine Wattimena	3	106.87	2025, Last 32
(Austria) Mensur Suljović	3	105.50	2016, Quarter-Final
(Netherlands) Dirk van Duijvenbode	3	104.15	2022, Quarter-Final
(England) Rob Cross	3	102.39	2017, Final
(England) James Wade	3	101.81	2011, Last 16
(Northern Ireland) Josh Rock	3	101.69	2022, Last 16
(England) Luke Littler	2	114.47	2026, Last 16
(England) Ritchie Edhouse	2	109.48	2024, Last 32
(South Africa) Devon Petersen	2	106.30	2020, Quarter-Final
(Germany) Ricardo Pietreczko	2	104.28	2023, Last 32
(England) Mark Walsh	2	104.10	2008, Last 32
(Belgium) Kim Huybrechts	2	103.81	2026, Last 32
(Netherlands) Jelle Klaasen	2	103.76	2013, Last 16
(England) Ian White	2	103.64	2020, Last 16
(Australia) Simon Whitlock	2	102.52	2011, Last 32
(Scotland) Robert Thornton	2	102.12	2008, Semi-Final
(Belgium) Dimitri Van den Bergh	2	101.53	2022, Last 32
(England) Wes Newton	1	106.09	2012, Last 32
(England) Jamie Caven	1	106.09	2013, Last 32
(Portugal) José de Sousa	1	105.28	2022, Last 32
(Latvia) Madars Razma	1	104.92	2023, Last 32
(Northern Ireland) Brendan Dolan	1	104.68	2014, Last 32
(England) James Wilson	1	103.64	2018, Last 32
(England) Luke Woodhouse	1	103.40	2026, Quarter-Final
(England) Dennis Priestley	1	102.35	2008, Last 16
(Netherlands) Jeffrey de Zwaan	1	101.87	2019, Last 32
(England) Colin Osborne	1	101.80	2009, Last 16
(England) Steve West	1	101.67	2018, Quarter-Final
(Australia) Damon Heta	1	101.66	2021, Last 16
(Australia) Paul Nicholson	1	101.61	2011, Last 32
(Scotland) Cameron Menzies	1	101.53	2025, Last 16
(England) Ronnie Baxter	1	101.45	2011, Last 32
(Australia) Kyle Anderson	1	101.09	2018, Last 32
(Netherlands) Vincent van der Voort	1	101.09	2014, Last 32
(Belgium) Ronny Huybrechts	1	100.97	2013, Last 32
(Poland) Krzysztof Ratajski	1	100.79	2026, Quarter-Final
(Spain) Cristo Reyes	1	100.69	2015, Last 32
(Norway) Robert Wagner	1	100.59	2014, Last 32
(Germany) Gabriel Clemens	1	100.36	2020, Last 32
(Lithuania) Darius Labanauskas	1	100.06	2020, Last 32
(England) Terry Jenkins	1	100.06	2014, Last 32

Five highest tournament averages
Average	Player	Year
111.54	(England) Phil Taylor	2009
108.20	(England) Phil Taylor	2008
105.87	(England) Phil Taylor	2016
105.53	(Netherlands) Michael van Gerwen	2016
105.15	(Netherlands) Michael van Gerwen	2015

== Television coverage ==
The PDC announced on August 12, 2008 that ITV4 would broadcast the entire event. This was the second PDC darts tournament that ITV4 have broadcast, after the inaugural Grand Slam of Darts – after its rating success ITV had chosen to broadcast this event as well as the 2008 Grand Slam of Darts.

The 2009 event was not televised in the UK, but the 2010 event was broadcast on Bravo, which screened live darts for the first time in its history. However, Bravo ceased broadcasting at the start of 2011. On June 26, 2011, it was announced that ITV4 would broadcast the 2011 event. In the Netherlands it is broadcast on RTL7 and in Germany it is broadcast on Sport1. On August 8, 2012 it was announced that ESPN would televise the event, becoming the first broadcaster to show both BDO and PDC dart tournaments. From 2013, the tournament returned to ITV4 as part of a deal between ITV and the PDC to show 4 tournaments from the PDC calendar.

=== List of United Kingdom broadcasters ===
- 2008; 2011; 2013–present: ITV4
- 2010: Bravo
- 2012: ESPN
- 2009: not televised in the UK

== Sponsorship ==
PartyPoker.net sponsored first six editions of the tournament – they also sponsored the US Open and the Las Vegas Desert Classic, two other non-defunct televised PDC events. In 2014, 888.com took over sponsoring of the tournament for one edition, with the tournament being sponsored by Unibet since 2015. In 2021, the tournament will be sponsored by Cazoo, who will also sponsor the PDC World Cup of Darts and the Grand Slam of Darts. Ahead of the 2023 tournament, Machineseeker were announced to be the new title sponsors.
