= 2026 International Darts Open =

2026 Elten Safety Shoes International Darts Open

Tournament information
- Dates: 22–24 May 2026
- Venue: SACHSENarena
- Location: Riesa, Germany
- Organisation(s): Professional Darts Corporation (PDC)
- Format: Legs
- Prize fund: £230,000
- Winner's share: £35,000
- High checkout: 170 Rob Cross

Champion(s)
- Ross Smith (ENG)

The 2026 International Darts Open (known for sponsorship reasons as the 2026 Elten Safety Shoes International Darts Open) was a professional darts tournament that took place at the SACHSENarena in Riesa, Germany, from 22 to 24 May 2026. It was the seventh of fifteen PDC European Tour events on the 2026 PDC Pro Tour. It featured a field of 48 players and £230,000 in prize money, with £35,000 going to the winner.

Stephen Bunting was the defending champion, having defeated Nathan Aspinall 8–5 in the 2025 final. However, he lost 6–2 to Rob Cross in the third round.

Ross Smith won the tournament, defeating Ryan Searle 8–3 in the final. It was his first European Tour title, having finished as runner-up in his first four European Tour finals.

== Prize money ==
As part of a mass boost in prize money for Professional Darts Corporation (PDC) events in 2026, the prize fund for all 2026 European Tour events rose to £230,000, of which the winner will receive £35,000.

Stage (num. of players)		Prize money
Winner	(1)	£35,000
Runner-up	(1)	£15,000
Semi-finalists	(2)	£10,000
Quarter-finalists	(4)	£8,000
Third round losers	(8)	£5,000
Second round losers	(16)	£3,500*
First round losers	(16)	£2,000*
Total	£230,000	

- Pre-qualified players from the Orders of Merit who lose in their first match of the event shall not be credited with prize money on any Order of Merit.

== Qualification and format ==
The top 16 players on the two-year PDC Order of Merit were seeded and entered the tournament in the second round, while the next 16 highest-ranked players from the one-year PDC Pro Tour Order of Merit automatically qualified for the first round. The seedings were confirmed on 9 April. The remaining 16 places went to players from four qualifying events – 10 from the Tour Card Holder Qualifier (held on 15 April), four from the Host Nation Qualifier (held on 1 March), one from the Nordic & Baltic Associate Member Qualifier (held on 24 April), and one from the East European Associate Member Qualifier (held on 12 April).

Luke Humphries and Michael Smith withdrew and were replaced by Rob Cross and Maik Kuivenhoven. In Humphries' place, Luke Woodhouse moved up to become the 16th seed. Gerwyn Price withdrew after the draw was made and was replaced by reserve player Christian Kist, going straight in at the second-round stage.

Seeded players

1. Gian van Veen (NED) (quarter-finals)
2. Michael van Gerwen (NED) (quarter-finals)
3. James Wade (ENG) (quarter-finals)
4. Stephen Bunting (ENG) (third round)
5. ~~Gerwyn Price (WAL)~~ (withdrew)
6. Josh Rock (NIR) (second round)
7. Danny Noppert (NED) (second round)
8. Ryan Searle (ENG) (runner-up)
9. Chris Dobey (ENG) (second round)
10. Ross Smith (ENG) (champion)
11. Martin Schindler (GER) (third round)
12. Jermaine Wattimena (NED) (third round)
13. Mike De Decker (BEL) (second round)
14. Wessel Nijman (NED) (third round)
15. Damon Heta (AUS) (third round)
16. Luke Woodhouse (ENG) (second round)

PDC Pro Tour Order of Merit qualifiers

- Dirk van Duijvenbode (NED) (first round)
- Niko Springer (GER) (first round)
- Niels Zonneveld (NED) (second round)
- Krzysztof Ratajski (POL) (second round)
- Daryl Gurney (NIR) (first round)
- William O'Connor (IRL) (second round)
- Joe Cullen (ENG) (second round)
- Ryan Joyce (ENG) (quarter-finals)
- Kevin Doets (NED) (third round)
- Andrew Gilding (ENG) (first round)
- Dave Chisnall (ENG) (second round)
- Cameron Menzies (SCO) (semi-finals)
- Karel Sedláček (CZE) (second round)
- Ricardo Pietreczko (GER) (third round)

Tour Card qualifier
- Chris Landman (NED) (first round)
- Bradley Brooks (ENG) (second round)
- Tom Bissell (ENG) (first round)
- Kim Huybrechts (BEL) (third round)
- Jeffrey Sparidaans (NED) (first round)
- Madars Razma (LAT) (second round)
- Keane Barry (IRL) (first round)
- Cristo Reyes (ESP) (first round)
- Connor Scutt (ENG) (second round)
- Charlie Manby (ENG) (second round)

Host Nation qualifier
- Finn Behrens (GER) (first round)
- Michael Unterbuchner (GER) (first round)
- Paul Krohne (GER) (first round)
- Liam Maendl-Lawrance (GER) (first round)

Nordic & Baltic qualifier
- Johan Engström (SWE) (first round)

East European qualifier
- György Jehirszki (HUN) (first round)

Reserve list
- Rob Cross (ENG) (semi-finals)
- Maik Kuivenhoven (NED) (first round)
- Christian Kist (NED) (second round)

== Summary ==
=== First round ===
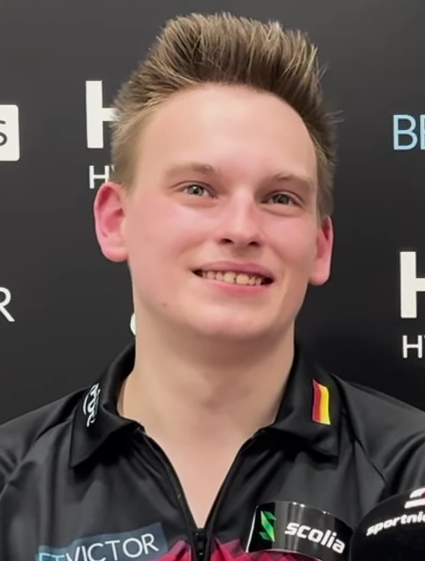
Ricardo Pietreczko (pictured in 2025) was the only victorious German player in the first round. He defeated Maik Kuivenhoven 6–2.

The first round (best of 11 legs) was played on 22 May. Charlie Manby was successful in his European Tour debut, defeating Niko Springer 6–3. On facing Ryan Searle in the second round, he commented: "I think Ryan [Searle] and I are both top-quality players. I know I'm good enough as well, and I've got the belief in myself that I need to be here." Kevin Doets achieved the first round's only three-dart average above the 100 mark, averaging 102.48 in a whitewash win over Tom Bissell. "I didn't go all the way last time, so that's what I'm trying to do this weekend," said Doets, in reference to his runner-up finish at the Austrian Darts Open. All four host nation qualifiers went out in the first round: Finn Behrens lost 6–1 to Connor Scutt, Liam Maendl-Lawrance lost 6–3 to Dave Chisnall, Paul Krohne lost 6–2 to William O'Connor, and Michael Unterbuchner lost in a deciding leg to Cameron Menzies. Ricardo Pietreczko was the only German player to advance to the second round, earning his first win in 11 matches amid a battle with dartitis by defeating Maik Kuivenhoven 6–2. The 2020 champion Joe Cullen recovered from 5–3 down to beat Chris Landman 6–5.

Rob Cross aided his chances at qualifying for the World Matchplay by defeating Dirk van Duijvenbode in a deciding leg, with all 11 legs of the match being holds of throw. "I just kept my nose in front," stated Cross afterwards. It just shows I didn't need his throw, I needed mine. I was lucky enough to get away with it." Karel Sedláček whitewashed Swedish qualifier Johan Engström, while Kim Huybrechts missed opportunities to seal his own whitewash victory against Daryl Gurney, eventually winning 6–2. Krzysztof Ratajski earned a 6–4 victory over Cristo Reyes, who missed 19 darts at double. Niels Zonneveld, Madars Razma, and Ryan Joyce were 6–2 winners against Keane Barry, György Jehirszki, and Jeffrey Sparidaans, respectively. Bradley Brooks achieved his first European Tour win of the year by beating Andrew Gilding 6–4.

=== Second round ===
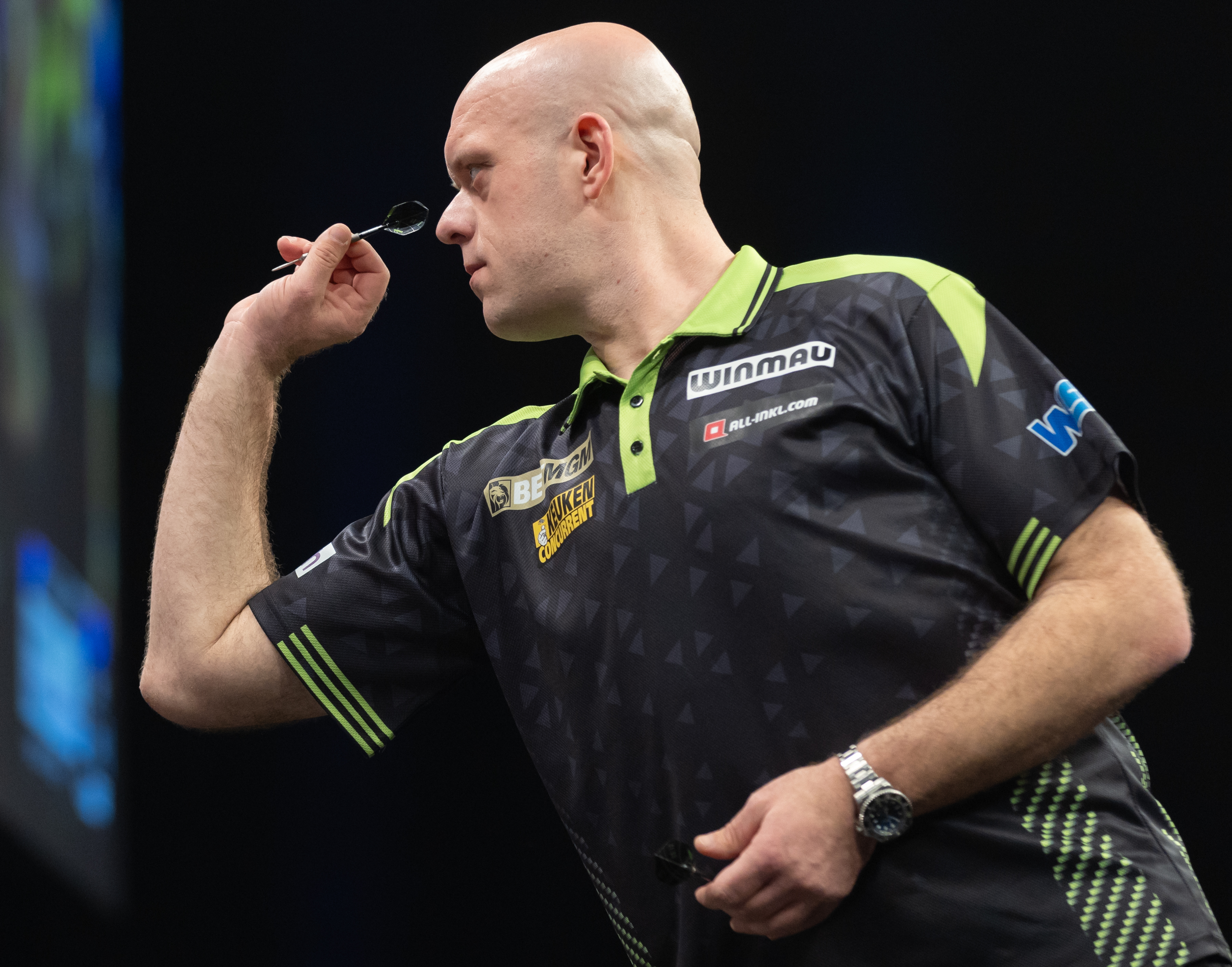
Michael van Gerwen (pictured in 2026) won his second-round match 6‍–‍5 against Madars Razma, who missed six match darts.

The second round (best of 11 legs) was played on 23 May. The defending champion Stephen Bunting began his campaign with a 6–2 victory over Krzysztof Ratajski, averaging 102.54 with five maximums. "I feel great, I feel fresh and I feel ready to win," Bunting affirmed. "I won in the Premier League in Berlin last year and then came straight here and won this, so hopefully there's a lot of similarities." Top seed Gian van Veen won 6–3 against Connor Scutt, having lost his last three matches on the European Tour. "I think everyone who's watched me over the last few weeks knows it's been tough," commented Van Veen, who said the win on the day was needed. Michael van Gerwen hit checkouts of 164 and 127 as he came back from 3–0 to win a deciding leg against Madars Razma, who missed a total of six match darts. Cameron Menzies and Wessel Nijman also produced comeback victories, overturning deficits of 4–0 and 5–3 in their respective wins over sixth seed Josh Rock and William O'Connor.

Ricardo Pietreczko reached the last 16 of a European Tour event for the first time in a year by defeating seventh seed Danny Noppert 6–5. He was joined by compatriot Martin Schindler, who survived a match dart as he beat Karel Sedláček by the same scoreline. Kim Huybrechts eliminated ninth seed Chris Dobey, averaging 104.66 in a 6–5 win. Rob Cross won six consecutive legs to beat thirteenth seed Mike De Decker 6–2, while Kevin Doets won a deciding leg against sixteenth seed Luke Woodhouse for his third victory over Woodhouse in 19 days. Christian Kist, who replaced fifth seed Gerwyn Price in the tournament, was beaten 6–2 by Ryan Joyce. James Wade earned a whitewash win over Dave Chisnall, while Jermaine Wattimena came through a deciding leg against Bradley Brooks. Ross Smith and Ryan Searle were 6–3 winners over Joe Cullen and Charlie Manby, respectively, and Damon Heta defeated Niels Zonneveld 6–2.

=== Final day ===
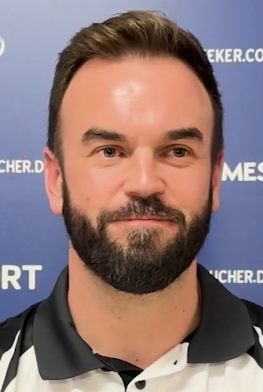
Ross Smith (pictured in 2025) won his first European Tour title in his fifth final.

The third round, quarter-finals, semi-finals and final were played on 24 May. The third round and quarter-finals were contested over the best of 11 legs, the semi-finals over the best of 13 legs, and the final over the best of 15 legs. The final day saw Ryan Searle and Ross Smith reach the final. Searle followed a 6–1 win over Kim Huybrechts by eliminating the top seed Gian van Veen in the quarter-finals, defeating the Dutchman 6–3. He was taken to a deciding leg in the semi-finals, as Rob Cross compiled checkouts of 126, 130, and 164, before a 170 checkout levelled the score at 6–6. Searle found his own ton-plus finish, a 130 checkout on the bullseye, to prevail 7–6. Smith defeated Ricardo Pietreczko 6–4 before claiming a deciding-leg victory over Michael van Gerwen in the quarter-finals. A 7–0 whitewash of Cameron Menzies, who reached his first European Tour semi-final of the year, secured Smith's place in the final. Both finalists were looking to win their first European Tour title, with Smith losing in his four previous finals, whereas Searle lost his only previous final at the 2024 Swiss Darts Trophy.

The English pair traded the opening two legs of the final, but Smith took a 3–1 lead by finding a break of throw in the fourth leg. In the sixth leg, he set up a smaller finish from 161 with Searle left on 133; Searle was unable to convert, and Smith hit double 8 to maintain a two-leg advantage at 4–2. Searle registered another leg, but Smith went on to win the final 8–3, claiming five of the last six legs. Smith averaged 90.81 compared to Searle's 90.11. Smith finished the tournament with the most maximums of any player, hitting 14.

Smith won his ninth PDC ranking title and first European Tour title, having finished as runner-up at the 2024 European Darts Open, the 2024 European Darts Grand Prix, the 2025 Austrian Darts Open, and the 2026 European Darts Grand Prix. He also became the seventh different winner on the European Tour in 2026. "I’m so happy to finally win one," said Smith after the final. On his final opponent, he commented: "Ryan will win loads of these, he’s Ryan Searle, he’s fantastic, he definitely let me off in the final there." Searle believed he "shot [his] bolt" against Rob Cross in the semi-finals, describing his performance in the final as "a little bit flat".

== Draw ==
The draw was confirmed on 21 May. Numbers to the left of a player's name show the seedings for the top 16 in the tournament. The figures to the right of a player's name state their three-dart average in a match. The three reserve players are indicated by 'Alt'. Players in bold denote match winners.

**First round** (best of 11 legs); 22 May
**Connor Scutt 91.76**	**6**
Finn Behrens 72.58	1
**Kevin Doets 102.48**	**6**
Tom Bissell 89.32	0
Niko Springer 82.27	3
**Charlie Manby 94.94**	**6**
Daryl Gurney 83.56	2
**Kim Huybrechts 85.23**	**6**
**Krzysztof Ratajski 86.60**	**6**
Cristo Reyes 87.22	4
Dirk van Duijvenbode 99.18	5
**Alt**	**Rob Cross 95.13**	**6**
**Ryan Joyce 99.58**	**6**
Jeffrey Sparidaans 90.05	2
Andrew Gilding 93.70	4
**Bradley Brooks 91.65**	**6**
**Madars Razma 89.73**	**6**
György Jehirszki 83.55	2
**Niels Zonneveld 96.47**	**6**
Keane Barry 89.14	2
**Ricardo Pietreczko 85.63**	**6**
Alt	Maik Kuivenhoven 84.47	2
**Joe Cullen 91.87**	**6**
Chris Landman 86.81	5
**Dave Chisnall 85.87**	**6**
Liam Maendl-Lawrance 75.95	3
**William O'Connor 95.71**	**6**
Paul Krohne 86.18	2
**Cameron Menzies 90.57**	**6**
Michael Unterbuchner 91.74	5
**Karel Sedláček 89.29**	**6**
Johan Engström 80.44	0

**Second round** (best of 11 legs); 23 May
**1**	**Gian van Veen 96.88**	**6**
Connor Scutt 89.95	3
16	Luke Woodhouse 90.76	5
**Kevin Doets 89.38**	**6**
**8**	**Ryan Searle 92.44**	**6**
Charlie Manby 91.89	3
9	Chris Dobey 98.80	5
**Kim Huybrechts 104.66**	**6**
**4**	**Stephen Bunting 102.54**	**6**
Krzysztof Ratajski 95.38	2
13	Mike De Decker 90.86	2
**Alt**	**Rob Cross 99.15**	**6**
Alt	Christian Kist 87.48	2
**Ryan Joyce 89.12**	**6**
**12**	**Jermaine Wattimena 87.53**	**6**
Bradley Brooks 87.19	5
**2**	**Michael van Gerwen 89.54**	**6**
Madars Razma 88.79	5
**15**	**Damon Heta 95.75**	**6**
Niels Zonneveld 98.06	2
7	Danny Noppert 91.81	5
**Ricardo Pietreczko 86.79**	**6**
**10**	**Ross Smith 102.17**	**6**
Joe Cullen 98.61	3
**3**	**James Wade 98.02**	**6**
Dave Chisnall 82.53	0
**14**	**Wessel Nijman 97.16**	**6**
William O'Connor 92.35	5
6	Josh Rock 99.17	4
**Cameron Menzies 97.26**	**6**
**11**	**Martin Schindler 84.26**	**6**
Karel Sedláček 81.74	5

**Third round** (best of 11 legs); 24 May
**1**	**van Veen 103.51**	**6**
Doets 96.89	2
**8**	**Searle 99.55**	**6**
Huybrechts 93.32	1
4	Bunting 85.95	2
**Alt**	**Cross 99.46**	**6**
**Joyce 96.99**	**6**
12	Wattimena 96.08	5
**2**	**van Gerwen 101.93**	**6**
15	Heta 95.06	3
Pietreczko 91.78	4
**10**	**Smith 92.50**	**6**
**3**	**Wade 95.09**	**6**
14	Nijman 98.85	5
**Menzies 95.61**	**6**
11	Schindler 92.83	2

**Quarter-finals** (best of 11 legs); 24 May
1	van Veen 88.38	3
**8**	**Searle 98.86**	**6**
**Alt**	**Cross 92.26**	**6**
Joyce 97.37	5
2	van Gerwen 94.27	5
**10**	**Smith 87.65**	**6**
3	Wade 97.70	4
**Menzies 94.39**	**6**

**Semi-finals** (best of 13 legs); 24 May
**8**	**Searle 98.35**	**7**
Alt	Cross 100.10	6
**10**	**Smith 97.42**	**7**
Menzies 89.49	0

**Final** (best of 15 legs); 24 May
8	Searle 90.11	3
**10**	**Smith 90.81**	**8**
