= 2025 Hungarian Darts Trophy =

Tournament information
- Dates: 19–21 September 2025
- Venue: MVM Dome
- Location: Budapest, Hungary
- Organisation(s): Professional Darts Corporation (PDC)
- Format: Legs
- Prize fund: £175,000
- Winner's share: £30,000
- High checkout: 170; András Borbély; Rob Cross; Niko Springer

Champion(s)
- Niko Springer

The 2025 Hungarian Darts Trophy was the twelfth of fourteen PDC European Tour events on the 2025 PDC Pro Tour. The tournament took place at the MVM Dome, Budapest, Hungary, from 19 to 21 September 2025. It featured a field of 48 players and £175,000 in prize money, with £30,000 going to the winner.

Michael van Gerwen was the defending champion after defeating Gian van Veen 8–7 in the 2024 final. However, he lost 6–5 to Danny Noppert in the third round.

Niko Springer won the tournament, his first PDC ranking title, by defeating Noppert 8–7 in the final.

== Prize money ==
The prize fund remained at £175,000, with £30,000 to the winner:

Stage (num. of players)		Prize money
Winner	(1)	£30,000
Runner-up	(1)	£12,000
Semi-finalists	(2)	£8,500
Quarter-finalists	(4)	£6,000
Third round losers	(8)	£4,000
Second round losers	(16)	£2,500*
First round losers	(16)	£1,250*
Total	£175,000	

- Pre-qualified players from the Orders of Merit who lose in their first match of the event shall not be credited with prize money on any Order of Merit. A player who qualifies as a qualifier, but later becomes a seed due to the withdrawal of one or more other players shall be credited with their prize money on all Orders of Merit regardless of how far they progress in the event.

== Qualification and format ==
In a change from the previous year, the top 16 on the two-year main PDC Order of Merit ranking were seeded and entered the tournament in the second round, while the 16 qualifiers from the one-year PDC Pro Tour Order of Merit ranking entered in the first round. In another change, the 16 Pro Tour Order of Merit qualifiers were drawn against one of the 16 other qualifiers in the first round.

The seedings were confirmed on 25 July. The remaining 16 places went to players from four qualifying events – 10 from the Tour Card Holder Qualifier (held on 31 July), four from the Host Nation Qualifier (held on 31 August), one from the Nordic & Baltic Associate Member Qualifier (held on 1 August), and one from the East European Associate Member Qualifier (held on 9 August).

Jonny Clayton, Gary Anderson and Boris Krčmar withdrew and were replaced by Richard Veenstra, Kim Huybrechts and Matthew Dennant. Martin Schindler and Mike De Decker moved up to become the 15th and 16th seeds respectively.

The following players took part in the tournament:

Seeded Players

1. Luke Humphries (quarter-finals)
2. Luke Littler (semi-finals)
3. Michael van Gerwen (third round)
4. Stephen Bunting (second round)
5. James Wade (quarter-finals)
6. Chris Dobey (quarter-finals)
7. Gerwyn Price (quarter-finals)
8. Rob Cross (third round)
9. Damon Heta (second round)
10. Dave Chisnall (second round)
11. Ross Smith (second round)
12. Peter Wright (second round)
13. Josh Rock (semi-finals)
14. Danny Noppert (runner-up)
15. Martin Schindler (third round)
16. Mike De Decker (third round)

Pro Tour Order of Merit Qualifiers
- Cameron Menzies (third round)
- Gian van Veen (first round)
- Wessel Nijman (first round)
- Ryan Searle (first round)
- Nathan Aspinall (second round)
- Dirk van Duijvenbode (first round)
- Jermaine Wattimena (first round)
- Andrew Gilding (first round)
- Daryl Gurney (second round)
- Ricardo Pietreczko (second round)
- Luke Woodhouse (second round)
- Joe Cullen (second round)
- Raymond van Barneveld (third round)
- Ryan Joyce (second round)

Tour Card Qualifier
- Robert Owen (second round)
- Ritchie Edhouse (first round)
- Niko Springer (champion)
- Jim Williams (first round)
- Cam Crabtree (first round)
- Tom Bissell (second round)
- Thibault Tricole (third round)
- Lukas Wenig (first round)
- Darren Beveridge (second round)
- Leon Weber (first round)

Host Nation Qualifier
- Nándor Prés (first round)
- Nándor Major (first round)
- András Borbély (first round)
- Levente Sárai (first round)

Nordic & Baltic Qualifier
- Andreas Hyllgaardhus (first round)

Reserve List
- Richard Veenstra (second round)
- Kim Huybrechts (third round)
- Matthew Dennant (second round)

== Summary ==
=== First round ===
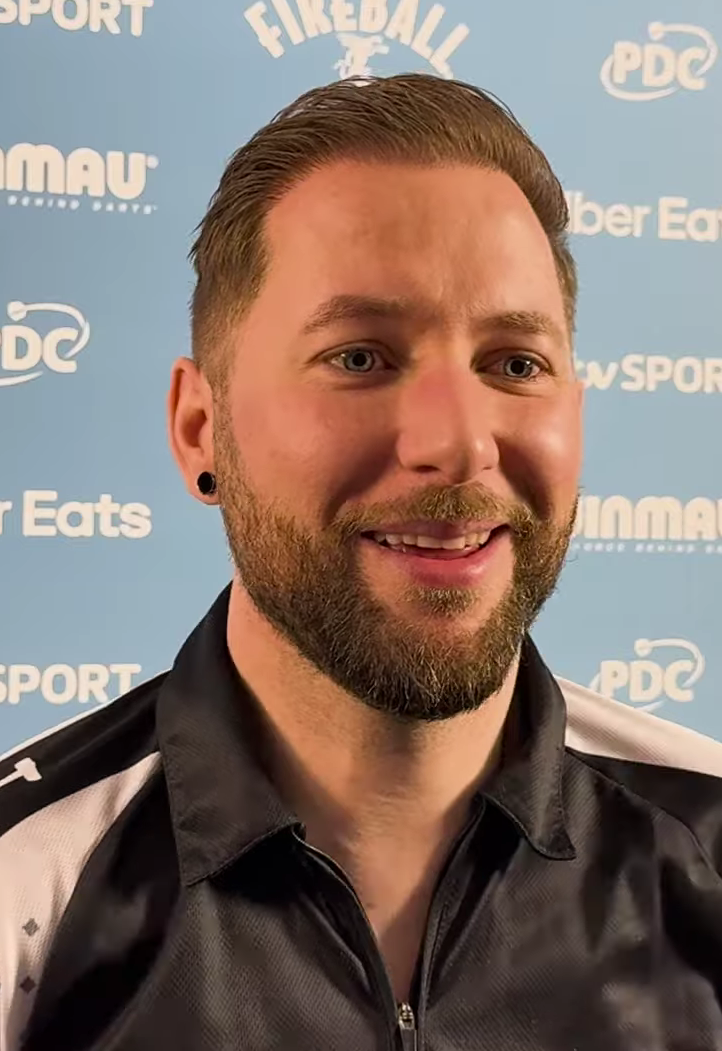
After surviving a match dart against Robert Owen in his opening match, Danny Noppert (pictured) reached the final.

The first round was played on 19 September. Nathan Aspinall progressed to the second round with a whitewash victory over Hungarian qualifier Levente Sárai to set up a tie against world number one Luke Humphries. 2022 champion Joe Cullen survived three match darts against Lukas Wenig in a 6–5 win. On facing reigning world champion Luke Littler the following day, Cullen said, "I've beaten him this year and on my day I can beat anybody, so bring it on." Wessel Nijman and Andrew Gilding suffered surprise early defeats; Nijman lost 6–2 to first-time European Tour winner Darren Beveridge while Gilding lost 6–4 to reserve player Matthew Dennant. Dutch players Jermaine Wattimena and Dirk van Duijvenbode lost last-leg deciders to Thibault Tricole and Tom Bissell respectively, while Gian van Veen averaged close to 106 in his 6–3 defeat to Niko Springer. Hungarian qualifier András Borbély achieved a 170 checkout during his 6–4 loss against Luke Woodhouse. The other two Hungarian qualifiers were also eliminated; Nándor Prés was beaten 6–1 by Cameron Menzies and Nándor Major lost 6–2 to five-time world champion Raymond van Barneveld. Ryan Joyce eliminated reigning European Champion Ritchie Edhouse, Kim Huybrechts defeated Danish debutant Andreas Hyllgaardhus and Robert Owen won a deciding leg against Ryan Searle.

=== Second round ===
The second round was played on 20 September. Luke Littler defeated Joe Cullen 6–1 to advance to the final day and was joined by Luke Humphries and Michael van Gerwen, who beat Nathan Aspinall and Matthew Dennant respectively. Raymond van Barneveld registered a three-dart average of 107.97 in his 6–1 victory over 2023 champion Dave Chisnall. "Today it just clicked," said Van Barneveld, who was glad that he could take his performances in the practice room to the stage. Thibault Tricole eliminated fourth seed Stephen Bunting, who missed eight match darts as Tricole recovered from 5–2 down to win 6–5. Gerwyn Price defeated Richard Veenstra 6–2 to set up a match against Van Barneveld in the third round, with Price claiming he had "plenty more in the tank" heading into the final day. Martin Schindler won five consecutive legs to beat Ryan Joyce 6–2, while his compatriot Niko Springer defeated Damon Heta 6–1. Ricardo Pietreczko landed checkouts of 124, 126 and 161 in his 6–3 loss to Josh Rock. Robert Owen missed a match dart to eliminate Danny Noppert in a deciding leg, while Kim Huybrechts prevailed in his own deciding leg against Peter Wright.

=== Final day ===
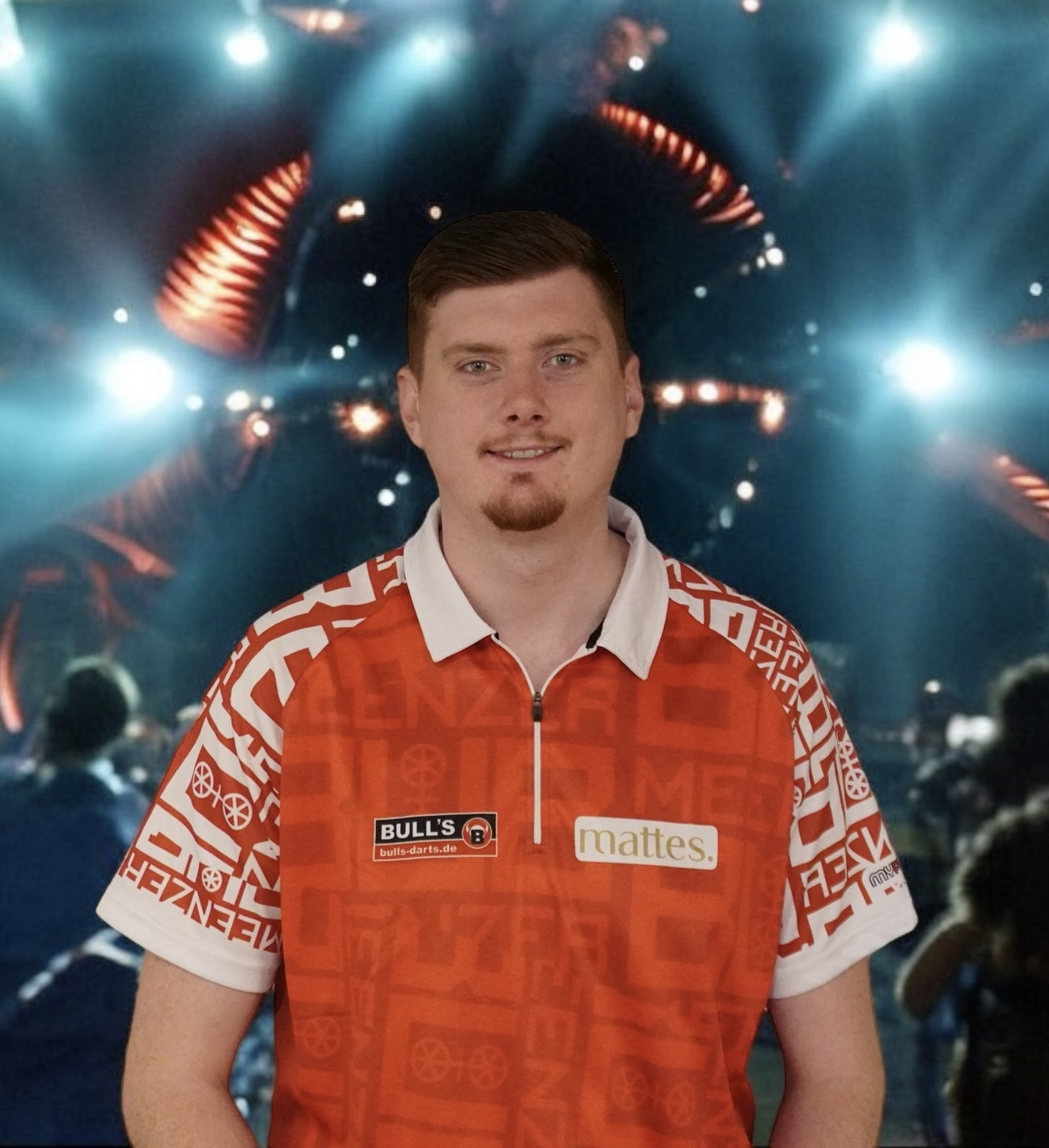
Niko Springer (pictured in 2024) defeated world number one Luke Humphries en route to his first PDC ranking title.

The third round, quarter-finals, semi-finals and final were played on 21 September. Gerwyn Price withdrew from the tournament before his quarter-final match against Luke Littler for medical reasons. The final day saw Niko Springer and Danny Noppert reach the final. After beating world champions Rob Cross and Luke Humphries, Springer defeated Josh Rock in a deciding leg in the semi-finals, having hit a 170 checkout, missed double 12 for a nine-dart finish and survived a match dart from Rock. Cross also landed a 170 checkout in his loss to Springer, while Humphries recorded the highest three-dart average in tournament history as he defeated Mike De Decker 6–1 in the third round, averaging 113.05. 2022 UK Open champion Noppert reached the final following victories against Michael van Gerwen, Chris Dobey and Littler. Both players were seeking their first European Tour title, with Noppert reaching his first final since 2022 and Springer appearing in his second final of the year after losing to Jonny Clayton at the Dutch Darts Championship.

Springer and Noppert traded holds of throw to start the final until Noppert found a break to go 3–2 ahead. The Dutchman extended his lead to 4–2 and 5–3, but Springer found a break of his own with a 120 checkout to level the match at 5–5. The final entered a deciding leg for the third consecutive year at the Hungarian Darts Trophy, where Springer eventually hit double 8 to secure an 8–7 victory. Springer ended the match with a lower average than Noppert, averaging 89.28 to Noppert's 93.59. Unseeded qualifier Springer, who entered the tournament as the world number 70, won his first PDC ranking title in his first year as a PDC Tour Card holder; he defeated six of the world's top 20 during his campaign. He became the fourth German player to win a European Tour event after Max Hopp, Ricardo Pietreczko and Martin Schindler. Springer stated that he was "over the moon" in his post-match interview, adding, "I took my chances and I am very happy, I can't believe it." Noppert thanked the Budapest crowd and commended his opponent's performance, saying that Springer "deserved it in the end" and that he "played a good last leg".

== Draw ==
The draw was announced on 18 September. Numbers to the left of a player's name show the seedings for the top 16 in the tournament. The figures to the right of a player's name state their three-dart average in a match. Players in bold denote match winners.

**First round** (best of 11 legs); 19 September
**Nathan Aspinall 101.33**	**6**
Levente Sárai 78.07	0
Dirk van Duijvenbode 83.44	5
**Tom Bissell 84.30**	**6**
**Daryl Gurney 84.64**	**6**
Leon Weber 79.77	1
Gian van Veen 105.95	3
**Niko Springer 95.74**	**6**
Jermaine Wattimena 87.94	5
**Thibault Tricole 86.29**	**6**
**Ricardo Pietreczko 89.81**	**6**
Jim Williams 87.36	1
**Luke Woodhouse 93.92**	**6**
András Borbély 96.55	4
**Kim Huybrechts 89.14**	**6**
Andreas Hyllgaardhus 74.79	2
**Joe Cullen 93.79**	**6**
Lukas Wenig 89.36	5
**Ryan Joyce 92.00**	**6**
Ritchie Edhouse 92.16	2
**Richard Veenstra 96.99**	**6**
Cam Crabtree 89.80	3
**Raymond van Barneveld 90.24**	**6**
Nándor Major 78.30	2
Andrew Gilding 90.65	4
**Matthew Dennant 83.29**	**6**
Ryan Searle 100.68	5
**Robert Owen 98.71**	**6**
Wessel Nijman 82.27	2
**Darren Beveridge 93.07**	**6**
**Cameron Menzies 89.52**	**6**
Nándor Prés 75.49	1

**Second round** (best of 11 legs); 20 September
**1**	**Luke Humphries 95.50**	**6**
Nathan Aspinall 99.65	4
**16**	**Mike De Decker 92.55**	**6**
Tom Bissell 87.44	2
**8**	**Rob Cross 102.17**	**6**
Daryl Gurney 95.63	3
9	Damon Heta 89.34	1
**Niko Springer 96.31**	**6**
4	Stephen Bunting 93.02	5
**Thibault Tricole 89.20**	**6**
**13**	**Josh Rock 99.62**	**6**
Ricardo Pietreczko 100.39	3
**5**	**James Wade 91.78**	**6**
Luke Woodhouse 95.24	3
12	Peter Wright 82.95	5
**Kim Huybrechts 90.67**	**6**
**2**	**Luke Littler 94.50**	**6**
Joe Cullen 83.60	1
**15**	**Martin Schindler 99.97**	**6**
Ryan Joyce 85.85	2
**7**	**Gerwyn Price 96.76**	**6**
Richard Veenstra 89.50	2
10	Dave Chisnall 98.84	1
**Raymond van Barneveld 107.97**	**6**
**3**	**Michael van Gerwen 85.78**	**6**
Matthew Dennant 79.89	2
**14**	**Danny Noppert 95.69**	**6**
Robert Owen 93.97	5
**6**	**Chris Dobey 92.06**	**6**
Darren Beveridge 89.87	3
11	Ross Smith 85.29	4
**Cameron Menzies 88.48**	**6**

**Third round** (best of 11 legs); 21 September
**1**	**Humphries 113.05**	**6**
16	De Decker 93.53	1
8	Cross 95.51	3
**Springer 93.14**	**6**
Tricole 93.57	3
**13**	**Rock 97.96**	**6**
**5**	**Wade 100.53**	**6**
Huybrechts 97.14	2
**2**	**Littler 99.20**	**6**
15	Schindler 89.49	2
**7**	**Price 102.50**	**6**
van Barneveld 89.05	2
3	van Gerwen 98.28	5
**14**	**Noppert 101.37**	**6**
**6**	**Dobey 98.42**	**6**
Menzies 94.17	5

**Quarter-finals** (best of 11 legs); 21 September
1	Humphries 101.11	4
**Springer 101.87**	**6**
**13**	**Rock 93.32**	**6**
5	Wade 83.83	2
2	**Littler**	**w/o**
7	Price	w/d
**14**	**Noppert 97.24**	**6**
6	Dobey 104.21	2

**Semi-finals** (best of 13 legs); 21 September
**Springer 99.64**	**7**
13	Rock 101.08	6
2	Littler 92.79	4
**14**	**Noppert 89.79**	**7**

**Final** (best of 15 legs); 21 September
**Springer 89.28**	**8**
14	Noppert 93.59	7

== Top averages ==
The table lists all players who achieved an average of at least 100 in a match. In the case one player has multiple records, this is indicated by the number in brackets.

#	Player	Round	Average	Result
1	Luke Humphries	3	113.05	Won
2	Raymond van Barneveld	2	107.97	Won
3	Gian van Veen	1	105.95	Lost
4	Chris Dobey	Quarter-final	104.21	Lost
5	Gerwyn Price	3	102.50	Won
6	Rob Cross	2	102.17	Won
7	Niko Springer	Semi-final	101.87	Won
8	Danny Noppert	3	101.37	Won
9	Nathan Aspinall	1	101.33	Won
10	Luke Humphries (2)	Quarter-final	101.11	Lost
11	Josh Rock	Semi-final	101.08	Lost
12	Ryan Searle	1	100.68	Lost
13	James Wade	3	100.53	Won
