= Cameron Menzies =

Scottish darts player (born 1989)

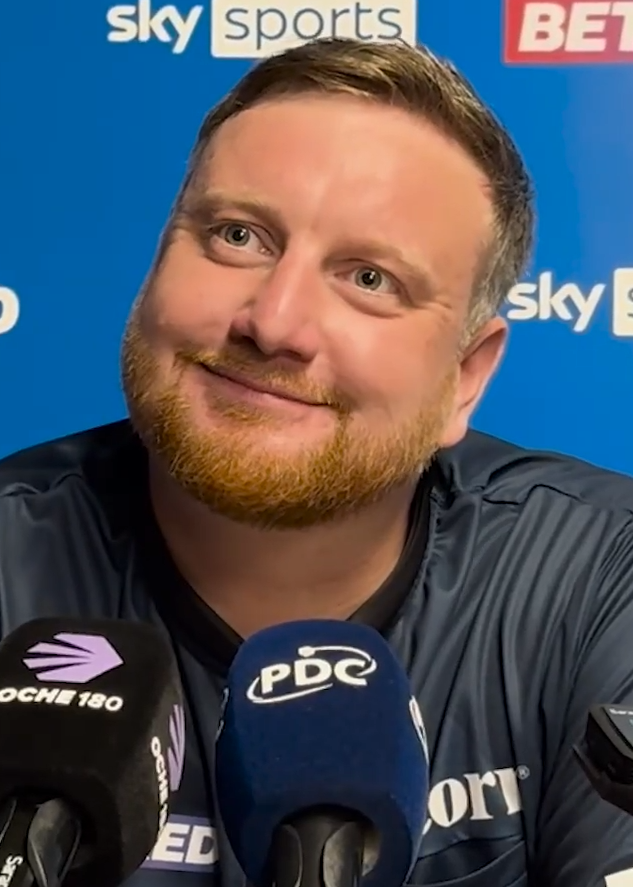
- Menzies at the 2026 World Matchplay

Personal information
- Nickname: "Cammy"
- Born: 27 June 1989 (age 37) Ayrshire, Scotland
- Home town: Muirkirk, East Ayrshire, Scotland

Sport
- Sport: Darts
- Playing since: 2003
- Darts: 24g Unicorn Signature
- Laterality: Right-handed
- Walk-on music: "The Glen" by Beluga Lagoon (Levi Heron remix)

Organisation (see split in darts)
- BDO: 2006–2018
- PDC: 2018–present (Tour Card: 2022–present)
- WDF: 2006–2021
- Current world ranking: (PDC) 26 (5 November 2026)

WDF major events – best performances
- World Championship: Semi-final: 2022
- World Masters: Semi-final: 2017
- World Trophy: Last 32: 2017
- Finder Masters: Last 24 Group: 2017

PDC premier events – best performances
- World Championship: Last 64: 2023, 2024
- World Matchplay: Last 16: 2026
- World Grand Prix: Quarter-final: 2025
- UK Open: Last 32: 2025
- Grand Slam: Quarter-final: 2024
- European Championship: Last 16: 2025
- PC Finals: Last 32: 2022, 2024
- Masters: Last 16: 2025
- World Series Finals: Last 16: 2025

Other tournament wins
- Years
Benidorm Open	2011, 2024
British Open	2016
Isle of Man Classic	2020
PDC Challenge Tour (×4)	2018, 2019 (×2), 2021
Scottish Classic	2017
Scottish Open	2017
Welsh Open	2021
Players Championships (×4)
2024, 2025, 2026 (×2)

Cameron Menzies (born 27 June 1989) is a Scottish professional darts player who competes in Professional Darts Corporation (PDC) events. A PDC Tour Card holder since 2022, Menzies has won four Players Championship titles. He is a two-time PDC major quarter-finalist, reaching the last eight at the 2024 Grand Slam and the 2025 World Grand Prix.

Menzies previously participated in British Darts Organisation (BDO) and World Darts Federation (WDF) events. He reached the semi-finals at the 2017 World Masters and the 2022 Lakeside World Championship.

== Career ==
=== BDO career ===
Menzies first played darts on the BDO circuit in 2006, playing in the Gibraltar Open. However, he did not emerge to prominence until 2016 where he won the British Open. He played in the 2016 World Masters but lost to Irish darts player John O'Shea in the last 80. In 2017, he became the first Scottish player to win the Scottish Open since Gary Anderson 10 years before. He qualified for the 2017 BDO World Trophy through the regional qualifiers. He reached the semi-finals of the 2017 World Masters before losing to eventual champion Krzysztof Ratajski.

=== 2017–2021: PDC ===
Menzies qualified for the 2017 Grand Slam of Darts virtue of his BDO ranking. Menzies finished third in his group losing to Gary Anderson 5–3 and Berry van Peer 5–4 but winning 5–2 against Simon Whitlock.

Menzies entered the PDC 2018 Q-School after his early loss at the 2018 BDO World Darts Championship. He then qualified the 2018 European Darts Open (ET1) and beat Mark Wilson 6–2 in the first round, before losing to the eventual champion Michael van Gerwen.

Menzies won one Challenge Tour event in 2018 and two in 2019.

=== 2022–2023 ===
Menzies was one of thirteen players to earn a PDC Tour Card at 2022 UK Q-School through the Order of Merit ranking. Despite now being a PDC player, he was granted permission to take part in the 2022 WDF World Championship after qualifying for the tournament by winning the 2021 Welsh Open. He achieved wins over Ian Jones, Wayne Warren and James Hurrell before losing 5–4 to Thibault Tricole in the semi-finals.

=== 2024 ===
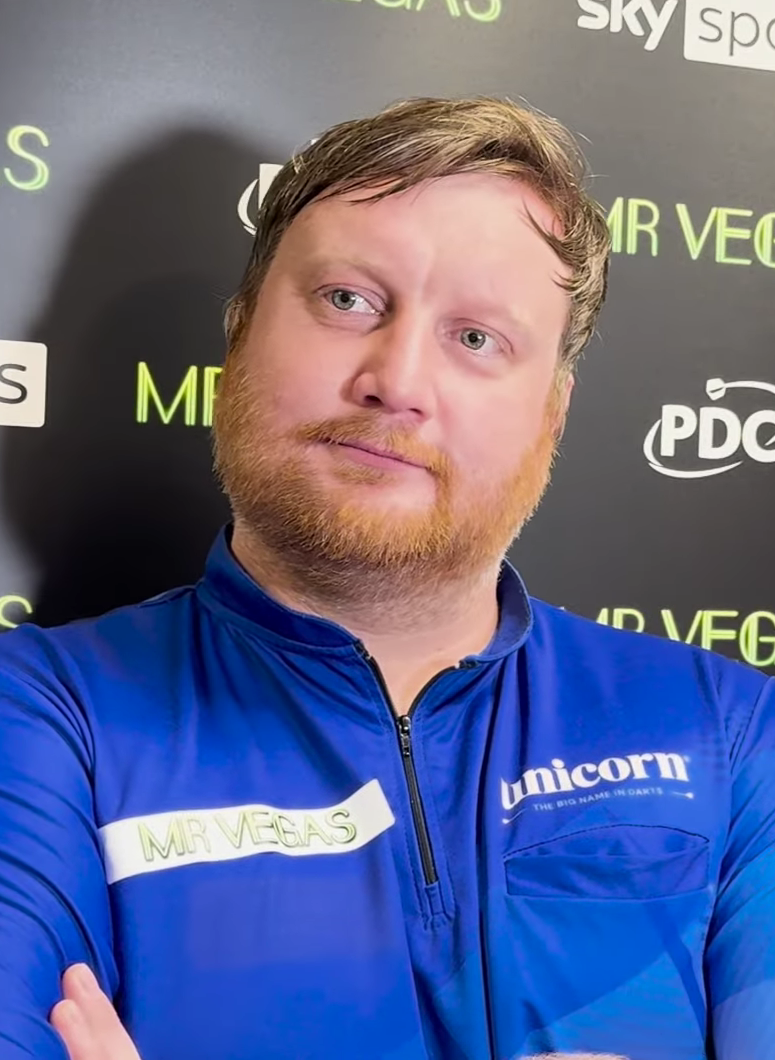
Menzies at the 2024 Grand Slam of Darts

In October 2024, Menzies won his maiden senior PDC title at Players Championship 29, defeating Stephen Bunting 8–4 in the final.

In November, Menzies reached his first PDC major quarter-final at the Grand Slam of Darts after a close 10–9 victory over James Wade. He then faced Mickey Mansell, whom he lost to 16–15 in a deciding leg.

=== 2025 ===
Menzies qualified for the 2025 PDC World Championship as the highest unseeded player on the Pro Tour Order of Merit. However, a visibly emotional Menzies was eliminated in the first round, losing 3–1 to Leonard Gates.

In late January, Menzies was one of eight players to qualify for the PDC World Masters through the preliminary rounds; he defeated Berry van Peer, Ricky Evans and Gian van Veen en route. At the tournament, he won his opening match 3–1 against Dave Chisnall but was beaten 4–1 by Nathan Aspinall in the second round. In April, he won his second PDC ranking title by defeating Peter Wright 8–3 in the final of Players Championship 11. Menzies reached his second PDC major quarter-final at the World Grand Prix following a 3–1 win over Rob Cross in the second round. He was eliminated in a 3–1 defeat to eventual runner-up Luke Humphries.

=== 2026 ===
In the first round of the 2026 World Championship, Menzies lost 3–2 to Charlie Manby. As Manby celebrated, Menzies began punching the underside of a drinks table on stage out of frustration, cutting his right hand open in the process. He was subsequently taken to hospital. Menzies later apologised for his behaviour, revealing that his uncle had recently died but that it was "no excuse for what [he] did on the stage". He represented Scotland for the first time at the World Cup of Darts, qualifying ahead of Peter Wright to team with Gary Anderson. The pair reached the semi-finals, where they were beaten by eventual champions England.

Menzies won his third PDC ranking title at Players Championship 23 in July, defeating Cristo Reyes 8–5 in the final. Later that month, he won his opening match at the World Matchplay by beating second seed Luke Humphries 10–7, completing the upset victory with a 170 checkout. During his second-round match against Ross Smith, Menzies began feeling unwell and was taken off the stage. The match was abandoned and Smith received a place in the quarter-finals, with the PDC later revealing that Menzies had been experiencing high blood pressure, which led to dizziness and him subsequently fainting.

== Personal life ==
Menzies played as a goalkeeper for Scottish football club Lugar Boswell Thistle. He is a supporter of Rangers.

Menzies dated fellow darts player Fallon Sherrock from 2021 to 2025. In May 2025, Menzies revealed that he had quit his day job as a plumber to focus on darts full-time.

== World Championship results ==
=== BDO World Championship ===
- 2018: First round (lost to Conan Whitehead 1–3)

=== WDF World Championship ===
- 2022: Semi-finals (lost to Thibault Tricole 4–5)

=== PDC World Championship ===
- 2023: Second round (lost to Vincent van der Voort 0–3)
- 2024: Second round (lost to Dave Chisnall 1–3)
- 2025: First round (lost to Leonard Gates 1–3)
- 2026: First round (lost to Charlie Manby 2–3)

== Performance timeline ==
=== BDO ===
Tournament	2007	2010	2013	2014	2015	2016	2017
BDO Ranked televised events
World Masters	1R	1R	2R	2R	1R	3R	SF

=== WDF ===
Tournament	2022
WDF Major/platinum events
World Championship	SF

=== PDC ===
Tournament	2017	2019	2020	2022	2023	2024	2025	2026
PDC Ranked televised events
World Championship	Did not qualify				2R	2R	1R	1R
World Masters	Did not qualify						2R	Prel.
UK Open	DNQ	2R	1R	2R	3R	4R	5R	4R
World Matchplay	Did not qualify						1R	2R
World Grand Prix	Did not qualify					1R	QF	1R
European Championship	DNQ						2R	2R
Grand Slam	RR	DNQ				QF	DNQ	2R
Players Championship Finals	Did not qualify			2R	1R	2R	1R	
PDC Non-ranked televised events
World Cup of Darts	Did not qualify							SF
World Series Finals	Did not qualify					1R	2R	DNQ
Career statistics
Season-end ranking (PDC)	NR	161	203	74	54	39	26	

==== European Tour ====
Season	1	2	3	4	5	6	7	8	9	10	11	12	13	14	15
2018	EDO; 2R	GDG; DNQ	GDO; 2R	ADO; 1R	EDG; DNQ	DDM; 3R	Did not qualify								
2019	Did not participate								CDO; DNQ	ADC; QF	DNP				
2022	DNP			ADO; 2R	EDO; 2R	DNP			EDM; 2R	DNQ		BDO; 1R	GDT; DNQ		
2023	DNQ			GDG; 2R	ADO; 1R	DDC; DNQ	BDO; WD	DNQ			GDO; 3R	DNQ			
2024	BDO; DNQ	GDG; 2R	IDO; 3R	DNQ			DDC; 3R	DNQ		FDT; 1R	HDT; DNQ	SDT; 3R	CDO; 1R		
2025	BDO; 1R	EDT; QF	IDO; 3R	GDG; 2R	ADO; WD	EDG; 3R	DDC; 2R	EDO; QF	BSD; 2R	FDT; 1R	CDO; 2R	HDT; 3R	SDT; WD	GDC; 3R	
2026	PDO; 3R	EDT; 1R	BDO; 2R	GDG; 1R	EDG; 2R	ADO; 1R	IDO; SF	BSD; 3R	SDO; 3R	EDO; 1R	HDT; 1R	CDO; 3R	FDT; 1R	SDT; 1R	DDC; 2R

==== Players Championships ====
Season	1	2	3	4	5	6	7	8	9	10	11	12	13	14	15	16	17	18	19	20	21	22	23	24	25	26	27	28	29	30	31	32	33	34
2018 (Note: Not a Tour card holder)	BAR; DNP		BAR; 2R	BAR; 1R	MIL; 4R	MIL; 2R	Did not participate								BAR; 2R	BAR; 2R	BAR; 1R	BAR; 1R	DUB; 3R	DUB; 2R	BAR; 4R	BAR; 1R												
2019	Did not participate																WIG; 1R	WIG; 1R	Did not participate						BAR; 1R	BAR; 1R	DUB; 1R	DUB; 1R	BAR; DNP					
2020	Did not participate								MIL; 1R	MIL; 1R	MIL; 2R	MIL; 1R	MIL; 1R	Did not participate																				
2021	Did not participate																																	
2022	BAR; 3R	BAR; 1R	WIG; 2R	WIG; 4R	BAR; 2R	BAR; 4R	NIE; DNP		BAR; 2R	BAR; 2R	BAR; 2R	BAR; DNP		WIG; 2R	WIG; 2R	NIE; DNP		BAR; 4R	BAR; 1R	BAR; 1R	BAR; 4R	BAR; 1R	BAR; 2R	BAR; 3R	BAR; 1R	BAR; 4R	BAR; 1R	BAR; 2R	BAR; 2R	BAR; 2R				
2023	BAR; 2R	BAR; 2R	BAR; 1R	BAR; 1R	BAR; 3R	BAR; 1R	HIL; 1R	HIL; 2R	WIG; 2R	WIG; 2R	LEI; 2R	LEI; 1R	HIL; 1R	HIL; 1R	LEI; 1R	LEI; 3R	HIL; 1R	HIL; 2R	BAR; QF	BAR; 4R	BAR; 1R	BAR; 2R	BAR; 2R	BAR; 3R	BAR; 2R	BAR; 3R	BAR; 1R	BAR; 3R	BAR; 1R	BAR; 2R				
2024	WIG; 4R	WIG; 4R	LEI; 2R	LEI; 1R	HIL; QF	HIL; 1R	LEI; DNP	LEI; 1R	HIL; 2R	HIL; 2R	HIL; 1R	HIL; 2R	MIL; 3R	MIL; SF	MIL; 4R	MIL; QF	MIL; QF	MIL; SF	MIL; F	WIG; QF	WIG; 2R	MIL; 3R	MIL; 1R	WIG; DNP	WIG; 2R	WIG; 1R	WIG; 2R	WIG; 1R	LEI; W	LEI; 2R				
2025	WIG; DNP		ROS; 3R	ROS; F	LEI; 2R	LEI; 1R	HIL; 2R	HIL; 3R	LEI; SF	LEI; F	LEI; W	LEI; DNP	ROS; 3R	ROS; 3R	HIL; DNP		LEI; 3R	LEI; 1R	LEI; 1R	LEI; 3R	LEI; 4R	HIL; 4R	HIL; 1R	MIL; 2R	MIL; 4R	HIL; 2R	HIL; 3R	LEI; 4R	LEI; 4R	LEI; 4R	WIG; 2R	WIG; 1R	WIG; 4R	WIG; 1R
2026	HIL; 2R	HIL; 1R	WIG; 1R	WIG; 1R	LEI; 3R	LEI; 1R	LEI; 2R	LEI; 1R	WIG; 3R	WIG; 4R	MIL; 1R	MIL; 2R	HIL; DNP		LEI; 3R	LEI; 3R	LEI; 2R	LEI; 1R	MIL; 1R	MIL; 1R	WIG; 1R	WIG; 2R	LEI; W	LEI; 3R	HIL; DNP		LEI; QF	LEI; 3R	ROS; W	ROS; 1R	ROS; 1R	ROS; 3R	LEI; 2R	LEI; 2R

Performance Table Legend
W	Won the tournament	F	Finalist	SF	Semifinalist	QF	Quarterfinalist	#R; RR; Prel.	Lost in # round Round-robin; Preliminary round	DQ	Disqualified
DNQ	Did not qualify	DNP	Did not participate	WD	Withdrew	NH	Tournament not held	#R; RR; Prel.	Lost in # round Round-robin; Preliminary round	NYF	Not yet founded
