= 2025 PDC Pro Tour =

Darts tournament series

Final 2025 PDC Pro Tour Order of Merit Prize money in units of £1,000
Rank	Player	Prize money
1	Gerwyn Price	169
2	Stephen Bunting	166.5
3	Nathan Aspinall	152
4	Wessel Nijman	148
5	Gian van Veen	146.5
6	Martin Schindler	145
7	Ross Smith	145
8	Jonny Clayton	129.5
9	Damon Heta	128.5
10	Josh Rock	125
11	Jermaine Wattimena	123.5
12	Chris Dobey	120.5
13	Luke Littler	118.5
14	Cameron Menzies	111
15	Danny Noppert	109
16	Dirk van Duijvenbode	107.5

The 2025 PDC Pro Tour was a series of non-televised darts tournaments organised by the Professional Darts Corporation (PDC). Players Championships and European Tours are the events that make up the Pro Tour. The 2025 calendar consisted of 34 Players Championship events, 14 European Tour events, as well as 24 events for each of the PDC's secondary tours—the Challenge Tour, Development Tour and Women's Series.

== Prize money ==
The prize money remained unchanged from the previous year. The breakdown for each tour is shown below:

Stage	ET	PC	CT/DT	WS
Winner	£30,000	£15,000	£2,500	£2,000
Runner-up	£12,000	£10,000	£1,000	£1,000
Semi-finalists	£8,500	£5,000	£750	£500
Quarter-finalists	£6,000	£3,500	£500	£300
Last 16	£4,000	£2,500	£300	£200
Last 32	£2,500 (Note: Pre-qualified players from the PDC and PDC Pro Tour Orders of Merit who lose in their first match of the event shall not be credited with prize money on any Order of Merit. A player who qualifies as a qualifier, but later becomes a seed due to the withdrawal of one or more other players shall be credited with their prize money on all Orders of Merit regardless of how far they progress in the event.)	£1,500	£200	£100
Last 48	£1,250	N/A	N/A	N/A
Last 64	N/A	£1,000	£75	£50 (Note: Last 64 prize money is only paid out if a minimum of 128 participants take part in a Women's Series event.)
Total	£175,000	£125,000	£15,000	£10,000

== PDC Tour Card ==
128 players were granted Tour Cards, which enabled them to participate in all Players Championships events, the UK Open, qualifiers for all European Tours, as well as the qualifiers for the World Masters, World Series Finals, Grand Slam and the World Championship.

=== Tour Cards ===
The 128 2025 PDC Tour Cards were awarded to:

- (64) The top 64 players from the PDC Order of Merit after the 2025 World Championship.
  - 56th-placed Steve Beaton resigned his Tour Card. His spot went to the 65th ranked player, Nick Kenny.
- (28) 28 qualifiers from 2024 Q-School not ranked in the top 64 of the PDC Order of Merit following the World Championship.
  - Leighton Bennett's Tour Card was removed as he had received an eight-year ban from competing in DRA-sanctioned events.
  - Paul Krohne handed in his Tour Card.
- (2) Two highest qualifiers from the 2023 Challenge Tour (Berry van Peer and Owen Bates).
- (1) Highest qualifier from the 2023 Development Tour (Nathan Rafferty).
  - Wessel Nijman, the other highest qualifier from the 2023 Development Tour, was in the top 64 of the PDC Order of Merit, and therefore, one extra Tour Card was awarded to a Q-School qualifier.
- (2) Two highest qualifiers from the 2024 Challenge Tour (Wesley Plaisier and Christian Kist).
- (2) Two highest qualifiers from the 2024 Development Tour (Niko Springer and Sebastian Białecki).
- (8) The daily winners from the 2025 Q-Schools.

Afterwards, the playing field was complemented by the highest qualified players from the Q-School Order of Merit until the maximum number of 128 Pro Tour Card players was reached. In 2025, a total of 21 additional players qualified this way.

==== Q-School ====
PDC Qualifying School (or Q-School) was split into two different events: UK Q-School for British and Irish players, held at Arena MK in Milton Keynes, England; and European Q-School for the rest of Europe, held at Wunderland Kalkar in Kalkar, Germany. Non-European players could choose which Q-School to compete in.

There are two stages in Q-School:

- The First Stage, played between 6–8 January, was entered by any darts player who registered to compete. The eight quarter-finalists from each of the three days qualified for the Final Stage alongside other players coming from a First Stage Order of Merit ranking to produce a full list of 128 players for each Final Stage.
- The Final Stage, held between 9–12 January, consisted of all players qualified from the First Stage plus the players exempted to the Final Stage; players who were exempted were those who lost their PDC Tour Cards after the 2025 World Championship, and those who finished from third to sixteenth in the 2024 Challenge Tour and Development Tour Orders of Merit who did not have PDC Tour Cards yet.

The winner of each day's play in the Final Stage was given a PDC Tour Card.

UK Q-School
January 9	January 10	January 11	January 12
Tom Bissell (ENG)	Justin Hood (ENG)	Tavis Dudeney (ENG)	Jim Long (CAN)
128 players	127 players	126 players	125 players
European Q-School
January 9	January 10	January 11	January 12
Viktor Tingström (SWE)	Kai Gotthardt (GER)	Dennie Olde Kalter (NED)	Maik Kuivenhoven (NED)
128 players	127 players	126 players	125 players

To complete the field of 128 Tour Card Holders, a ranking was created for each Q-School and a point was awarded for every win after the last 64. Available Tour Card places for each Q-School were allocated in proportion to the total number of participants, with 9 cards going to the UK Q-School and 12 going to the European Q-School.

At the end of the fourth day in the Final Stage, based on their ranking, the following players picked up Tour Cards as a result:

UK Q-School Order of Merit

1. Bradley Brooks (ENG)
2. Darryl Pilgrim (ENG)
3. Greg Ritchie (SCO)
4. Adam Lipscombe (ENG)
5. Adam Paxton (ENG)
6. Cam Crabtree (ENG)
7. Adam Warner (ENG)
8. Andy Boulton (SCO)
9. Thomas Lovely (ENG)

European Q-School Order of Merit

1. Cor Dekker (NOR)
2. Pero Ljubić (CRO)
3. Karel Sedláček (CZE)
4. Oskar Lukasiak (SWE)
5. Tytus Kanik (POL)
6. Rusty-Jake Rodriguez (AUT)
7. Dominik Grüllich (GER)
8. Stefaan Henderyck (BEL)
9. Maximilian Czerwinski (GER)
10. Max Hopp (GER)
11. Leon Weber (GER)
12. Marvin van Velzen (NED)

== Players Championships ==
The PDC Players Championships (PC) are a series of non-televised darts events that are part of the PDC Pro Tour. Starting in 2025, the number of events increased by four compared to previous years, bringing the total to 34 Players Championship events per year.

The Players Championship Order of Merit is determined based on the total prize money won by each player in the Players Championship events throughout the year. The top 64 players on this ranking qualified for the Players Championship Finals.

2025 PDC Players Championship season
No.	Date	Venue	Winner	Legs	Runner-up	Ref.
1	Monday 10 February	Robin Park Tennis Centre, (England) Wigan	Rob Cross (104.60)	8 – 3	Joe Cullen (94.26)	
2	Tuesday 11 February	Robin Park Tennis Centre, (England) Wigan	Gerwyn Price (99.58)	8 – 7	Chris Dobey (101.83)	
3	Monday 17 February	Autotron, (Netherlands) Rosmalen	Chris Dobey (100.87)	8 – 4	Jelle Klaasen (87.34)	
4	Tuesday 18 February	Autotron, (Netherlands) Rosmalen	Ryan Searle (100.76)	8 – 3	Cameron Menzies (96.99)	
5	Tuesday 11 March	Leicester Arena, (England) Leicester	Joe Cullen (104.18)	8 – 7	Gian van Veen (100.33)	
6	Wednesday 12 March	Leicester Arena, (England) Leicester	Gian van Veen (97.41)	8 – 3	Luke Humphries (97.95)	
7	Monday 17 March	Halle 39, (Germany) Hildesheim	Gary Anderson (93.64)	8 – 3	Adam Lipscombe (89.58)	
8	Tuesday 18 March	Halle 39, (Germany) Hildesheim	Martin Schindler (86.57)	8 – 1	Jeffrey de Graaf (78.31)	
9	Monday 31 March	Leicester Arena, (England) Leicester	Gerwyn Price (94.67)	8 – 4	Ian White (96.99)	
10	Tuesday 1 April	Leicester Arena, (England) Leicester	Josh Rock (95.56)	8 – 4	Cameron Menzies (92.90)	
11	Tuesday 8 April	Leicester Arena, (England) Leicester	Cameron Menzies (107.25)	8 – 3	Peter Wright (103.45)	
12	Wednesday 9 April	Leicester Arena, (England) Leicester	Gerwyn Price (101.39)	8 – 7	Josh Rock (110.70)	
13	Monday 14 April	Autotron, (Netherlands) Rosmalen	Damon Heta (94.91)	8 – 6	Nathan Aspinall (88.45)	
14	Tuesday 15 April	Autotron, (Netherlands) Rosmalen	Jonny Clayton (109.68)	8 – 2	Dominik Grüllich (92.24)	
15	Monday 12 May	Halle 39, (Germany) Hildesheim	Krzysztof Ratajski (101.73)	8 – 4	Dave Chisnall (98.39)	
16	Tuesday 13 May	Halle 39, (Germany) Hildesheim	Ross Smith (104.56)	8 – 0	Brendan Dolan (93.86)	
17	Tuesday 17 June	Leicester Arena, (England) Leicester	Chris Dobey (100.87)	8 – 7	Dirk van Duijvenbode (102.40)	
18	Wednesday 18 June	Leicester Arena, (England) Leicester	Stephen Bunting (104.84)	8 – 5	Jermaine Wattimena (99.65)	
19	Thursday 19 June	Leicester Arena, (England) Leicester	James Wade (101.52)	8 – 3	Scott Williams (99.58)	
20	Tuesday 8 July	Leicester Arena, (England) Leicester	Damon Heta (98.96)	8 – 7	Stephen Bunting (102.09)	
21	Wednesday 9 July	Leicester Arena, (England) Leicester	Bradley Brooks (96.46)	8 – 5	Gerwyn Price (100.73)	
22	Tuesday 29 July	Halle 39, (Germany) Hildesheim	Sebastian Białecki (91.78)	8 – 6	Niels Zonneveld (90.03)	
23	Wednesday 30 July	Halle 39, (Germany) Hildesheim	Jermaine Wattimena (95.52)	8 – 5	Lukas Wenig (93.56)	
24	Monday 25 August	Arena MK, (England) Milton Keynes	Jeffrey de Graaf (102.10)	8 – 7	Stephen Bunting (106.31)	
25	Tuesday 26 August	Arena MK, (England) Milton Keynes	Stephen Bunting (101.74)	8 – 6	Jonny Clayton (91.34)	
26	Tuesday 9 September	Halle 39, (Germany) Hildesheim	Gerwyn Price (109.28)	8 – 5	Gian van Veen (97.40)	
27	Wednesday 10 September	Halle 39, (Germany) Hildesheim	Joe Cullen (99.78)	8 – 7	Gerwyn Price (97.31)	
28	Tuesday 30 September	Leicester Arena, (England) Leicester	Ryan Searle (95.43)	8 – 6	Mario Vandenbogaerde (89.38)	
29	Wednesday 1 October	Leicester Arena, (England) Leicester	Ross Smith (104.32)	8 – 7	Josh Rock (102.76)	
30	Thursday 2 October	Leicester Arena, (England) Leicester	Wessel Nijman (103.44)	8 – 7	Damon Heta (102.00)	
31	Tuesday 14 October	Robin Park Tennis Centre, (England) Wigan	Jermaine Wattimena (101.02)	8 – 2	Nathan Aspinall (85.84)	
32	Wednesday 15 October	Robin Park Tennis Centre, (England) Wigan	Luke Littler (110.73)	8 – 2	Dennie Olde Kalter (97.35)	
33	Wednesday 29 October	Robin Park Tennis Centre, (England) Wigan	Chris Dobey (99.72)	8 – 6	William O'Connor (96.46)	
34	Thursday 30 October	Robin Park Tennis Centre, (England) Wigan	Wessel Nijman (100.45)	8 – 5	Luke Woodhouse (97.33)	

== European Tour ==
The PDC European Tour (ET) is a series of darts events that are part of the PDC Pro Tour. In 2025, the total number of events expanded to fourteen, one more than the previous years.

In a change from the previous year, the top 16 on the two-year main PDC Order of Merit ranking were seeded for events, while the 16 qualifiers from the one-year Pro Tour Order of Merit ranking were unseeded.

The PDC European Tour Order of Merit is determined based on the total prize money won by each player in the European Tour events throughout the year. The top 32 players on this ranking qualified for the European Championship.

Nathan Aspinall finished the year as the number one player on the European Tour Order of Merit, with Martin Schindler second and Stephen Bunting third.

2025 PDC European Tour season
No.	Date	Event	Location	Winner	Legs	Runner-up	Ref.
1	7–9 March	2025 Belgian Darts Open	(Belgium) Wieze, Oktoberhallen	Luke Littler (102.87)	8 – 5	Mike De Decker (92.25)	
2	21–23 March	2025 European Darts Trophy	(Germany) Göttingen, Lokhalle	Nathan Aspinall (98.19)	8 – 4	Ryan Joyce (93.71)	
3	4–6 April	2025 International Darts Open	(Germany) Riesa, WT Energiesysteme Arena	Stephen Bunting (100.19)	8 – 5	Nathan Aspinall (91.36)	
4	19–21 April	2025 German Darts Grand Prix	(Germany) Munich, Zenith	Michael van Gerwen (95.98)	8 – 5	Gian van Veen (96.53)	
5	25–27 April	2025 Austrian Darts Open	(Austria) Graz, Premstättner Halle	Martin Schindler (93.66)	8 – 4	Ross Smith (91.36)	
6	2–4 May	2025 European Darts Grand Prix	(Germany) Sindelfingen, Glaspalast	Gary Anderson (92.49)	8 – 0	Andrew Gilding (85.59)	
7	23–25 May	2025 Dutch Darts Championship	(Netherlands) Rosmalen, Autotron	Jonny Clayton (98.69)	8 – 6	Niko Springer (98.54)	
8	30 May–1 June	2025 European Darts Open	(Germany) Leverkusen, Ostermann-Arena	Nathan Aspinall (100.43)	8 – 6	Damon Heta (97.17)	
9	11–13 July	2025 Baltic Sea Darts Open	(Germany) Kiel, Wunderino Arena	Gerwyn Price (91.92)	8 – 3	Gary Anderson (89.80)	
10	29–31 August	2025 Flanders Darts Trophy	(Belgium) Antwerp, Antwerp Expo	Luke Littler (107.40)	8 – 7	Josh Rock (100.05)	
11	5–7 September	2025 Czech Darts Open	(Czech Republic) Prague, PVA EXPO Praha	Luke Humphries (93.89)	8 – 5	Josh Rock (94.12)	
12	19–21 September	2025 Hungarian Darts Trophy	(Hungary) Budapest, MVM Dome	Niko Springer (89.28)	8 – 7	Danny Noppert (93.59)	
13	26–28 September	2025 Swiss Darts Trophy	(Switzerland) Basel, St. Jakobshalle	Stephen Bunting (103.90)	8 – 3	Luke Woodhouse (94.74)	
14	17–19 October	2025 German Darts Championship	(Germany) Hildesheim, Halle 39	Nathan Aspinall (97.05)	8 – 6	Dirk van Duijvenbode (92.91)	

== PDC secondary tours ==
=== Challenge Tour ===
2025 Challenge Tour ranking
Rank	Player	Earnings
1	Stefan Bellmont	£11,150
2	Darius Labanauskas	£10,200
3	Ted Evetts	£8,725
4	Mervyn King	£7,975
5	Michael Unterbuchner	£7,825
6	Jamai van den Herik	£7,400
7	Jack Tweddell	£7,175
8	Sam Spivey	£6,225
9	Alexander Merkx	£6,200
10	Jurjen van der Velde	£5,900

2025 PDC Challenge Tour season
No.	Date	Venue	Winner	Legs	Runner-up	Ref.
1	Friday 17 January	Arena MK, (England) Milton Keynes	Beau Greaves (94.49)	5 – 4	Stefan Bellmont (88.85)	
2	Friday 17 January	Arena MK, (England) Milton Keynes	Carl Sneyd (91.86)	5 – 1	Tommy Lishman (87.56)	
3	Saturday 18 January	Arena MK, (England) Milton Keynes	Beau Greaves (101.55)	5 – 0	John Henderson (90.46)	
4	Saturday 18 January	Arena MK, (England) Milton Keynes	Darius Labanauskas (87.17)	5 – 3	Mervyn King (91.23)	
5	Sunday 19 January	Arena MK, (England) Milton Keynes	Stefan Bellmont (95.80)	5 – 1	Danny Jansen (84.17)	
6	Friday 14 March	Halle 39, (Germany) Hildesheim	Dragutin Horvat (97.30)	5 – 4	Ted Evetts (91.05)	
7	Friday 14 March	Halle 39, (Germany) Hildesheim	Darius Labanauskas (81.80)	5 – 2	Keegan Brown (70.61)	
8	Saturday 15 March	Halle 39, (Germany) Hildesheim	Darius Labanauskas (92.58)	5 – 4	Scott Waites (90.64)	
9	Saturday 15 March	Halle 39, (Germany) Hildesheim	Ted Evetts (94.91)	5 – 1	Michael Unterbuchner (88.71)	
10	Sunday 16 March	Halle 39, (Germany) Hildesheim	Scott Campbell (91.59)	5 – 3	Dan Hands (88.71)	
11	Friday 2 May	Arena MK, (England) Milton Keynes	Mervyn King (101.55)	5 – 0	Henry Coates (89.48)	
12	Friday 2 May	Arena MK, (England) Milton Keynes	Jamai van den Herik (92.89)	5 – 2	Graham Hall (90.83)	
13	Saturday 3 May	Arena MK, (England) Milton Keynes	Danny van Trijp (90.21)	5 – 2	Graham Hall (88.96)	
14	Saturday 3 May	Arena MK, (England) Milton Keynes	Stefan Bellmont (85.07)	5 – 3	Keegan Brown (79.52)	
15	Sunday 4 May	Arena MK, (England) Milton Keynes	Jack Tweddell (92.94)	5 – 1	Mervyn King (91.21)	
16	Friday 15 August	Leicester Arena, (England) Leicester	Joe Hunt (85.52)	5 – 4	(Scotland) Derek Maclean (88.77)	
17	Friday 15 August	Leicester Arena, (England) Leicester	Lee Cocks (82.65)	5 – 3	Jack Tweddell (87.00)	
18	Saturday 16 August	Leicester Arena, (England) Leicester	David Davies (91.50)	5 – 3	Alexander Merkx (86.17)	
19	Saturday 16 August	Leicester Arena, (England) Leicester	Jamai van den Herik (96.11)	5 – 4	Jenson Walker (89.34)	
20	Sunday 17 August	Leicester Arena, (England) Leicester	Scott Waites (100.38)	5 – 2	Michael Unterbuchner (98.51)	
21	Saturday 25 October	Robin Park Tennis Centre, (England) Wigan	Michael Unterbuchner (86.10)	5 – 3	Peter Burgoyne (81.09)	
22	Saturday 25 October	Robin Park Tennis Centre, (England) Wigan	Jurjen van der Velde (99.97)	5 – 2	Jamie Hughes (87.22)	
23	Sunday 26 October	Robin Park Tennis Centre, (England) Wigan	Stefan Bellmont (98.47)	5 – 3	Daniel Ayres (88.86)	
24	Sunday 26 October	Robin Park Tennis Centre, (England) Wigan	Sam Spivey (81.44)	5 – 3	Alexander Merkx (84.35)	

=== Development Tour ===
2025 Development Tour ranking
Rank	Player	Earnings
1	Cam Crabtree	£17,775
2	Beau Greaves	£15,250
3	Owen Bates	£10,900
4	Charlie Manby	£10,125
5	Jamai van den Herik	£9,600
6	Jurjen van der Velde	£9,225
7	Sebastian Białecki	£9,100
8	Dominik Grüllich	£8,725
9	Ryan Branley	£7,300
10	Leon Weber	£6,800

2025 PDC Development Tour season
No.	Date	Venue	Winner	Legs	Runner-up	Ref.
1	Friday 21 February	Arena MK, (England) Milton Keynes	Sebastian Białecki (89.34)	5 – 2	Owen Bates (92.89)	
2	Friday 21 February	Arena MK, (England) Milton Keynes	Beau Greaves (91.54)	5 – 3	Levy Frauenfelder (88.77)	
3	Saturday 22 February	Arena MK, (England) Milton Keynes	Owen Bates (85.59)	5 – 2	Charlie Manby (90.00)	
4	Saturday 22 February	Arena MK, (England) Milton Keynes	Beau Greaves (97.68)	5 – 2	James Beeton (96.58)	
5	Sunday 23 February	Arena MK, (England) Milton Keynes	Bradly Roes (83.11)	5 – 2	Oliver Pearce-Burgess (76.01)	
6	Friday 28 March	Leicester Arena, (England) Leicester	Beau Greaves (100.68)	5 – 3	Henry Coates (89.06)	
7	Friday 28 March	Leicester Arena, (England) Leicester	Ryan Branley (86.26)	5 – 4	Dominik Grüllich (94.47)	
8	Saturday 29 March	Leicester Arena, (England) Leicester	Patrik Williams (85.88)	5 – 2	Nathan Potter (83.06)	
9	Saturday 29 March	Leicester Arena, (England) Leicester	Owen Bates (99.43)	5 – 2	Leon Weber (91.00)	
10	Sunday 30 March	Leicester Arena, (England) Leicester	Dominik Grüllich (98.88)	5 – 0	Leon Weber (91.30)	
11	Friday 9 May	Halle 39, (Germany) Hildesheim	Cam Crabtree (92.52)	5 – 2	Adam Gawlas (90.14)	
12	Friday 9 May	Halle 39, (Germany) Hildesheim	Jannis Barkhausen (82.35)	5 – 2	Owen Bates (81.98)	
13	Saturday 10 May	Halle 39, (Germany) Hildesheim	Cam Crabtree (89.70)	5 – 1	Patrik Williams (77.42)	
14	Saturday 10 May	Halle 39, (Germany) Hildesheim	Jurjen van der Velde (91.85)	5 – 4	Henry Coates (86.60)	
15	Sunday 11 May	Halle 39, (Germany) Hildesheim	Cam Crabtree (90.54)	5 – 0	Jenson Walker (77.33)	
16	Friday 5 September	Robin Park Tennis Centre, (England) Wigan	Charlie Manby (93.02)	5 – 4	Owen Bates (91.39)	
17	Friday 5 September	Robin Park Tennis Centre, (England) Wigan	Jamai van den Herik (97.76)	5 – 1	Cam Crabtree (87.17)	
18	Saturday 6 September	Robin Park Tennis Centre, (England) Wigan	Tyler Thorpe (98.45)	5 – 3	Viktor Tingström (89.55)	
19	Saturday 6 September	Robin Park Tennis Centre, (England) Wigan	Cam Crabtree (86.90)	5 – 3	Sebastian Białecki (87.90)	
20	Sunday 7 September	Robin Park Tennis Centre, (England) Wigan	Jurjen van der Velde (92.21)	5 – 2	Henry Coates (88.14)	
21	Saturday 11 October	Robin Park Tennis Centre, (England) Wigan	Dominik Grüllich (84.06)	5 – 4	Beau Greaves (86.66)	
22	Saturday 11 October	Robin Park Tennis Centre, (England) Wigan	Cam Crabtree (81.28)	5 – 2	Viktor Tingström (77.14)	
23	Sunday 12 October	Robin Park Tennis Centre, (England) Wigan	Jamai van den Herik (78.52)	5 – 4	Cayden Smith (85.00)	
24	Sunday 12 October	Robin Park Tennis Centre, (England) Wigan	Leon Weber (102.95)	5 – 0	Adam Gawlas (84.22)	

=== Women's Series ===
2025 Women's Series standings
Rank	Player	Prize money
1	Beau Greaves (Note: Greaves qualified for the World Championship via the Development Tour.)	£37,600
2	Fallon Sherrock	£14,600
3	Lisa Ashton	£11,100
4	Noa-Lynn van Leuven	£9,600
5	Gemma Hayter	£8,500
6	Kirsi Viinikainen	£6,600
7	Robyn Byrne	£5,600
8	Lorraine Winstanley	£5,400
9	Rhian O'Sullivan	£5,000
10	Aileen de Graaf	£4,400

Tournament qualifications through PDC Women's Series
2025 Grand Slam of Darts
2026 PDC World Championship
Women's World Matchplay winner. Direct qualification to 2025 Grand Slam of Darts and 2026 PDC World Championship.

No.	Date	Venue	Winner	Legs	Runner-up	Ref.
1	Saturday 15 February	Leicester Arena, (England) Leicester	Lisa Ashton (92.01)	5 – 2	Gemma Hayter (78.08)	
2	Saturday 15 February	Leicester Arena, (England) Leicester	Fallon Sherrock (76.85)	5 – 3	Beau Greaves (76.93)	
3	Sunday 16 February	Leicester Arena, (England) Leicester	Beau Greaves (91.42)	5 – 1	Robyn Byrne (72.75)	
4	Sunday 16 February	Leicester Arena, (England) Leicester	Beau Greaves (89.77)	5 – 4	Gemma Hayter (92.93)	
5	Saturday 8 March	Leicester Arena, (England) Leicester	Kirsi Viinikainen (84.89)	5 – 2	Fallon Sherrock (80.60)	
6	Saturday 8 March	Leicester Arena, (England) Leicester	Beau Greaves (86.88)	5 – 1	Lisa Ashton (85.15)	
7	Sunday 9 March	Leicester Arena, (England) Leicester	Beau Greaves (92.78)	5 – 0	Katie Sheldon (73.78)	
8	Sunday 9 March	Leicester Arena, (England) Leicester	Beau Greaves (80.41)	5 – 1	Robyn Byrne (76.20)	
9	Saturday 12 April	Autotron, (Netherlands) Rosmalen	Noa-Lynn van Leuven (78.28)	5 – 0	Stefanie Lück (72.37)	
10	Saturday 12 April	Autotron, (Netherlands) Rosmalen	Noa-Lynn van Leuven (80.41)	5 – 1	Rhian O'Sullivan (67.38)	
11	Sunday 13 April	Autotron, (Netherlands) Rosmalen	Fallon Sherrock (81.68)	5 – 0	Lisa Ashton (74.40)	
12	Sunday 13 April	Autotron, (Netherlands) Rosmalen	Beau Greaves (100.20)	5 – 0	Robyn Byrne (72.13)	
13	Saturday 7 June	Arena MK, (England) Milton Keynes	Beau Greaves (89.37)	5 – 2	Fallon Sherrock (84.42)	
14	Saturday 7 June	Arena MK, (England) Milton Keynes	Beau Greaves (87.90)	5 – 4	Lorraine Winstanley (80.12)	
15	Sunday 8 June	Arena MK, (England) Milton Keynes	Beau Greaves (90.57)	5 – 2	Rhian O'Sullivan (75.11)	
16	Sunday 8 June	Arena MK, (England) Milton Keynes	Beau Greaves (86.88)	5 – 1	Lisa Ashton (76.88)	
17	Saturday 23 August	Arena MK, (England) Milton Keynes	Beau Greaves (94.97)	5 – 3	Fallon Sherrock (91.63)	
18	Saturday 23 August	Arena MK, (England) Milton Keynes	Beau Greaves (90.54)	5 – 2	Aileen de Graaf (77.87)	
19	Sunday 24 August	Arena MK, (England) Milton Keynes	Beau Greaves (98.56)	5 – 1	Fallon Sherrock (88.23)	
20	Sunday 24 August	Arena MK, (England) Milton Keynes	Beau Greaves (77.96)	5 – 3	Lisa Ashton (81.65)	
21	Saturday 18 October	Robin Park Tennis Centre, (England) Wigan	Beau Greaves (99.18)	5 – 4	Fallon Sherrock (96.16)	
22	Saturday 18 October	Robin Park Tennis Centre, (England) Wigan	Beau Greaves (101.98)	5 – 4	Fallon Sherrock (95.67)	
23	Sunday 19 October	Robin Park Tennis Centre, (England) Wigan	Beau Greaves (92.78)	5 – 0	Gemma Hayter (81.85)	
24	Sunday 19 October	Robin Park Tennis Centre, (England) Wigan	Beau Greaves (100.29)	5 – 3	Noa-Lynn van Leuven (87.08)	
