= Niko Springer =

German darts player (born 2000)

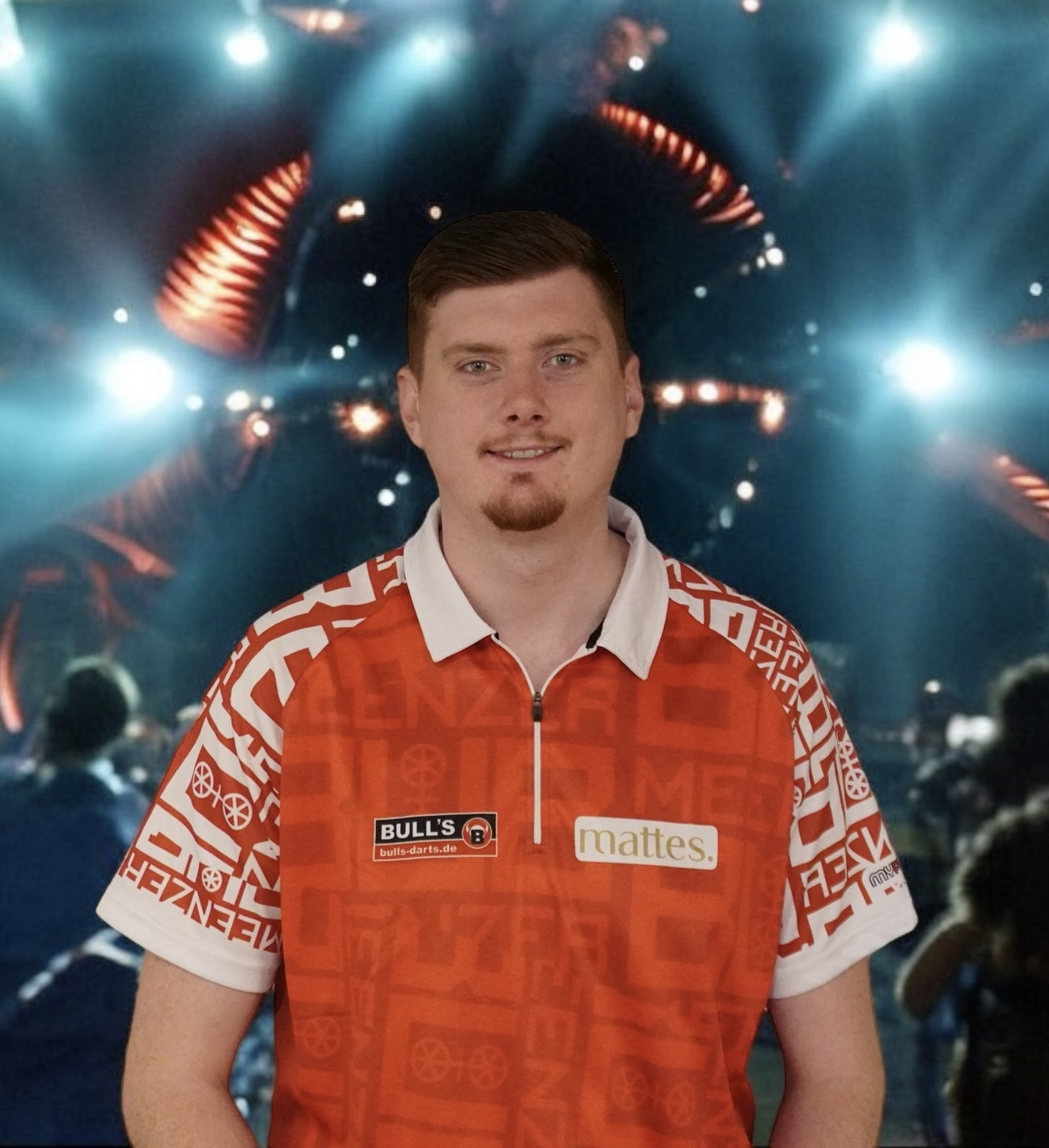
- Springer in 2024

Personal information
- Nickname: "Meenzer Bub"
- Born: 11 July 2000 (age 26) Mainz, Germany
- Home town: Siefersheim, Germany

Sport
- Sport: Darts
- Playing since: 2019
- Darts: 22g BEAZD Signature
- Laterality: Right-handed
- Walk-on music: "Legendary" by Welshly Arms

Organisation (see split in darts)
- PDC: 2019–present (Tour Card: 2025–present)
- Current world ranking: (PDC) 34 (5 November 2026)

PDC premier events – best performances
- World Championship: Last 96: 2025
- World Matchplay: Last 32: 2026
- World Grand Prix: Last 32: 2025, 2026
- UK Open: Last 96: 2025, 2026
- Grand Slam: Quarter-final: 2026
- European Championship: Last 32: 2025, 2026

Other tournament wins
- Years
Hungarian Darts Trophy	2025
PDC Development Tour	2024 (×3)
PDC Europe Next Gen	2024 (×4)

Niko Springer (born 11 July 2000) is a German professional darts player who competes in Professional Darts Corporation (PDC) events. Nicknamed "Meenzer Bub", he has held a PDC Tour Card since earning one through ranking second-place on the 2024 Development Tour. He won his first PDC ranking title at the 2025 Hungarian Darts Trophy on the European Tour. In 2024, Springer won three PDC Development Tours and four PDC Europe Next Gen titles.

== Career ==
=== Early career ===
Springer first took part in PDC Qualifying School (Q-School) in 2021, where he reached the final stage of European Q-School but was unable to obtain a PDC Tour Card. Due to his performances at Q-School, Springer received a wildcard for the 2021 PDC Europe Super League, where he was eliminated in the quarter-finals by the eventual tournament winner Martin Schindler.

During the 2021 PDC European Development Tour series, Springer made two finals, losing to Rusty-Jake Rodriguez on both occasions. His Development Tour ranking saw him qualify for the 2021 PDC World Youth Championship and the 2022 UK Open. Springer also reached his first PDC Challenge Tour final in 2021, losing 5–1 to José Justicia in Event 7.

In 2022, Springer qualified for his first two PDC European Tour events as a Host Nation Qualifier. At his debut tournament, the 2022 International Darts Open, Springer made the third round following wins over Jermaine Wattimena and Brendan Dolan, before losing 6–2 to Peter Wright. At the 2022 German Darts Championship, he lost 6–2 to Darius Labanauskas in the first round. Springer made the final of the 2022 PDC Europe Super League but lost the final 10–8 to Florian Hempel, missing out on qualification for the 2023 PDC World Darts Championship.

At the 2023 International Darts Open, Springer defeated Scott Williams in the first round before defeating Dimitri van den Bergh 6–1 in the second round. He lost in the third round to Damon Heta.

At the 2023 PDC Europe Super League, Springer achieved a nine-dart finish in a group stage match with Manfred Bilderl, notable for Springer achieving the perfect leg before Bilderl had the opportunity to complete his own nine-dart finish.

=== 2024: Development Tour success ===
During the 2024 PDC Development Tour series, Springer won his first three Development Tour titles, securing his third win in Event 20 against German compatriot Leon Weber. He finished second on the 2024 Development Tour final ranking, earning him a debut at the 2025 PDC World Darts Championship and a PDC Tour Card for the next two years. He also won four titles on the newly established 2024 PDC Europe Next Gen series, where he hit a 'double-in double-out' nine-dart finish in Event 4.

=== 2025: European Tour win ===
At the 2025 World Championship, Springer played 2024 semi-finalist Scott Williams in the first round. He won the first set 3–0 but lost the match 3–1 in sets. Springer made his second UK Open appearance at the 2025 event, and reached the third round. He defeated Cor Dekker 6–2 in the first round with a three-dart average of 115.92, his highest recorded PDC average and the second highest in the competition's history. In the second round, he beat Patrick Geeraets 6–5 in a deciding leg.

At the Dutch Darts Championship on the 2025 PDC European Tour, Springer – then ranked 93rd in the world – reached his first PDC ranking final in his first year on the senior tour after wins over Ricardo Pietreczko and Wessel Nijman in the final session. He missed out on his first senior title in an 8–6 loss to Jonny Clayton. At the Hungarian Darts Trophy, Springer won his first PDC ranking title. He defeated Luke Humphries and Josh Rock in the final session before an 8–7 victory over Danny Noppert in the final. He defeated six of the world's top 20 during his campaign. This helped him qualify for his debut at the World Grand Prix, where he lost to Stephen Bunting in the first round.

=== 2026 ===
Springer was eliminated from the 2026 World Championship in a 3–1 upset loss to Joe Comito in the first round. He defeated Stephen Bunting and Ross Smith en route to the quarter-finals of the European Darts Trophy, where he lost in a deciding leg to Damon Heta. He made his World Matchplay debut in July, losing 10–6 to defending champion Luke Littler in the first round.

== Personal life ==
Springer played football in his youth, but was forced to stop due to an injury. He is a supporter of local football club Mainz 05. His nickname, "Meenzer Bub", translates as "Lad from Mainz". Springer previously worked as a civil servant in Wiesbaden. On an episode of the Tops Tops Tops podcast, he revealed that he was going to leave his job in August 2025 to pursue darts full-time.

Springer's favourite darts player is Jelle Klaasen; the first darts event that he watched on television was the 2016 PDC World Darts Championship, where Klaasen reached the semi-finals. His younger brother, Felix, is also a darts player who competes in PDC events.

== World Championship results ==
=== PDC ===
- 2025: First round (lost to Scott Williams 1–3)
- 2026: First round (lost to Joe Comito 1–3)

== Performance timeline ==
Tournament	2021	2022	2023	2024	2025	2026
PDC Ranked televised events
World Championship	Did not qualify				1R	1R
World Masters	Did not qualify				Prel.	Prel.
UK Open	DNQ	1R	DNQ		3R	3R
World Matchplay	Did not qualify					1R
World Grand Prix	Did not qualify				1R	1R
European Championship	Did not qualify				1R	1R
Grand Slam	Did not qualify				2R	QF
Players Championship Finals	Did not qualify				WD	
PDC Non-ranked televised events
World Youth Championship	RR	2R	DNP	3R	DNP	
Career statistics
Season-end ranking	NR	167	167	139	54	

=== PDC European Tour ===
Season	1	2	3	4	5	6	7	8	9	10	11	12	13	14	15
2022	IDO; 3R	GDC; 1R	GDG; DNQ	Did not participate											
2023	BSD; 2R	EDO; DNQ	IDO; 3R	Did not qualify											
2024	BDO; DNP	DNQ		EDG; 1R	Did not participate/qualify				GDC; 1R	DNP					
2025	BDO; DNQ	EDT; 2R	IDO; 1R	GDG; DNQ	ADO; 2R	EDG; DNQ	DDC; F	EDO; 2R	BSD; 3R	FDT; DNQ	CDO; 2R	HDT; W	SDT; 1R	GDC; DNQ	
2026	PDO; 1R	EDT; QF	BDO; 1R	GDG; 3R	EDG; 3R	ADO; 3R	IDO; 1R	BSD; 3R	SDO; 1R	EDO; 2R	HDT; 2R	CDO; 2R	FDT; 2R	SDT; 2R	DDC; 1R

=== PDC Players Championships ===
Season	1	2	3	4	5	6	7	8	9	10	11	12	13	14	15	16	17	18	19	20	21	22	23	24	25	26	27	28	29	30	31	32	33	34
2025	WIG; 1R	WIG; 3R	ROS; 2R	ROS; 1R	LEI; 1R	LEI; 2R	HIL; 4R	HIL; 3R	LEI; 2R	LEI; 1R	LEI; 2R	LEI; 3R	ROS; 3R	ROS; 1R	HIL; 2R	HIL; 1R	LEI; 2R	LEI; 2R	LEI; 1R	LEI; 2R	LEI; 2R	HIL; 3R	HIL; 1R	MIL; 1R	MIL; 1R	HIL; 3R	HIL; 1R	LEI; 3R	LEI; 1R	LEI; 1R	WIG; 3R	WIG; 4R	WIG; 3R	WIG; 1R
2026	HIL; 2R	HIL; 1R	WIG; 4R	WIG; 1R	LEI; 4R	LEI; 1R	LEI; 2R	LEI; 3R	WIG; 2R	WIG; 1R	MIL; 2R	MIL; 2R	HIL; 3R	HIL; 1R	LEI; 3R	LEI; SF	LEI; 2R	LEI; QF	MIL; DNP		WIG; 2R	WIG; 2R	LEI; DNP		HIL; SF	HIL; 2R	LEI; 2R	LEI; 1R	ROS; DNP		ROS; 2R	ROS; 2R	LEI; 3R	LEI; 1R

Performance Table Legend
W	Won the tournament	F	Finalist	SF	Semifinalist	QF	Quarterfinalist	#R; RR; Prel.	Lost in # round Round-robin; Preliminary round	DQ	Disqualified
DNQ	Did not qualify	DNP	Did not participate	WD	Withdrew	NH	Tournament not held	#R; RR; Prel.	Lost in # round Round-robin; Preliminary round	NYF	Not yet founded
