= 2026 World Matchplay =

Darts tournament

2026 Betfred World Matchplay

Tournament information
- Dates: 18–26 July 2026
- Venue: Winter Gardens
- Location: Blackpool, England
- Organisation(s): Professional Darts Corporation (PDC)
- Format: Legs
- Prize fund: £1,000,000
- Winner's share: £225,000
- Nine-dart finish: Luke Littler
- High checkout: 170; Cameron Menzies; Nathan Aspinall

Champion(s)
- Luke Littler (ENG)

The 2026 World Matchplay (known for sponsorship reasons as the 2026 Betfred World Matchplay) was a professional darts tournament that took place from 18 to 26 July 2026 at the Winter Gardens in Blackpool, England. It was the 33rd staging of the World Matchplay by the Professional Darts Corporation (PDC). The event's prize fund was an increased total of £1,000,000, with the winner receiving £225,000. The fifth edition of the Women's World Matchplay also took place on 26 July and was won by Beau Greaves.

Sponsored by Betfred, the tournament featured 32 players, consisting of the top 16 players in the two-year PDC World Rankings and the top 16 players from the one-year PDC Pro Tour rankings who had not yet qualified. Kevin Doets, William O'Connor, Niko Springer and Niels Zonneveld made their debuts at the event. The 2021 champion Peter Wright missed out on qualification for the first time since 2012, while 2007 champion James Wade qualified for the 21st consecutive year.

Luke Littler was the defending champion, having defeated Wade 18–13 in the 2025 final. He hit the 11th nine-dart finish in World Matchplay history in the opening leg of his second-round match against Nathan Aspinall. He went on to reach his second straight final, a run that saw him become the first player to pass the £3 million mark in the PDC World Rankings. He faced Gerwyn Price, who reached his second World Matchplay final.

Littler defended his title by defeating Price 18–9 to win the tournament for the second time. He became the fourth player to retain the Phil Taylor Trophy and the first to do so since Michael van Gerwen in 2016. He set new records for the highest three-dart average in a World Matchplay final and the highest winning tournament average in World Matchplay history, both previously held by Taylor. He also surpassed his own record for the most maximums (180s) in a World Matchplay campaign, improving it from 64 to 66.

== Overview ==
=== Background ===
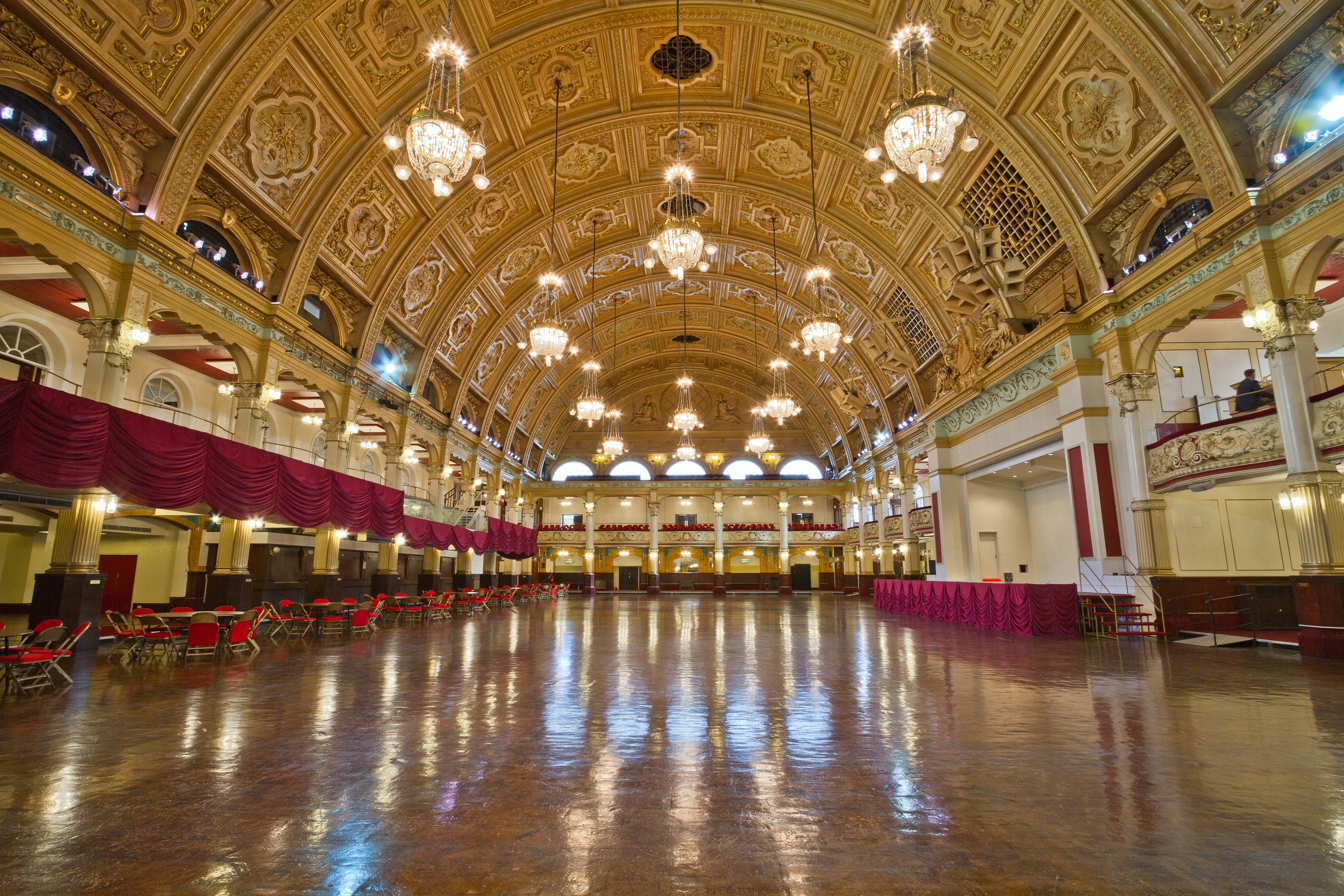
The tournament was held in the Empress Ballroom (pictured in 2016) at the Winter Gardens, Blackpool, England.

The 2026 World Matchplay was the 33rd edition of the tournament to be staged by the Professional Darts Corporation (PDC) since the inaugural event in 1994. Held annually at the Winter Gardens in Blackpool, England, with the exception of the 2020 event held in Milton Keynes, the inaugural champion was Larry Butler, who remains the only American to win a PDC major title; he defeated Dennis Priestley 16–12 in an upset victory in the final. In 2018, the World Matchplay trophy was renamed to the Phil Taylor Trophy, in honour of the sixteen-time champion who retired from professional darts following the 2018 World Championship. Taylor won his sixteenth and final World Matchplay title at the 2017 event. The Women's World Matchplay was introduced in 2022 as the PDC's first fully-televised women's tournament; the 2026 Women's World Matchplay was won by Beau Greaves.

The 2026 edition took place from 18 to 26 July 2026 in the Empress Ballroom at the Winter Gardens. British bookmaker Betfred continued its sponsorship of the event, having extended its partnership with the PDC until 2030. Luke Littler entered the tournament as defending champion, having defeated James Wade 18–13 in the 2025 final to win his first World Matchplay title.

=== Format ===
The top 16 players in the PDC World Rankings were seeded, and were drawn to compete against the 16 qualifiers from the PDC Pro Tour rankings in the first round. All matches were in leg play format. All matches had to be won by two clear legs; if the players could not be separated, the match was decided by a sudden-death leg.

The number of legs required to win increased as the tournament progressed:

- First round: Best of 19 legs (sudden death at 12–12)
- Second round: Best of 21 legs (sudden death at 13–13)
- Quarter-finals: Best of 31 legs (sudden death at 18–18)
- Semi-finals: Best of 33 legs (sudden death at 19–19)
- Final: Best of 35 legs (sudden death at 20–20)

=== Prize money ===
The prize fund for the event increased to £1,000,000, up from the previous year's total of £800,000. The winner received £225,000 and the Phil Taylor Trophy. The prize money breakdown is shown below:

Position (no. of players)		Prize money (Total: £1,000,000)
Winner	(1)	£225,000
Runner-up	(1)	£125,000
Semi-finalists	(2)	£65,000
Quarter-finalists	(4)	£35,000
Second round	(8)	£22,500
First round	(16)	£12,500

=== Broadcasts ===
The tournament was broadcast on Sky Sports in the United Kingdom and Ireland. Other broadcasters included DAZN in Germany, Austria, and Switzerland; Fox Sports in Australia; Sky Sport in New Zealand; Viaplay in the Netherlands, Iceland and Scandinavia; ESPN2 and ESPN+ in the United States; Canal+ in Poland; VTM in Belgium; Nova Sport in the Czech Republic and Slovakia; L'Équipe in France; AMC Network in Hungary; Arena Sport in Bosnia and Herzegovina, Kosovo, Montenegro, North Macedonia and Serbia; TV3 in the Baltic states; Zonasport in Croatia; Setanta in Ukraine; beIN Sports in the Middle East and North Africa; and StarHub TV in Singapore. It was also available for subscribers outside of the United Kingdom, Germany, Austria, and Switzerland on the PDC's streaming service, PDCTV.

== Qualification ==
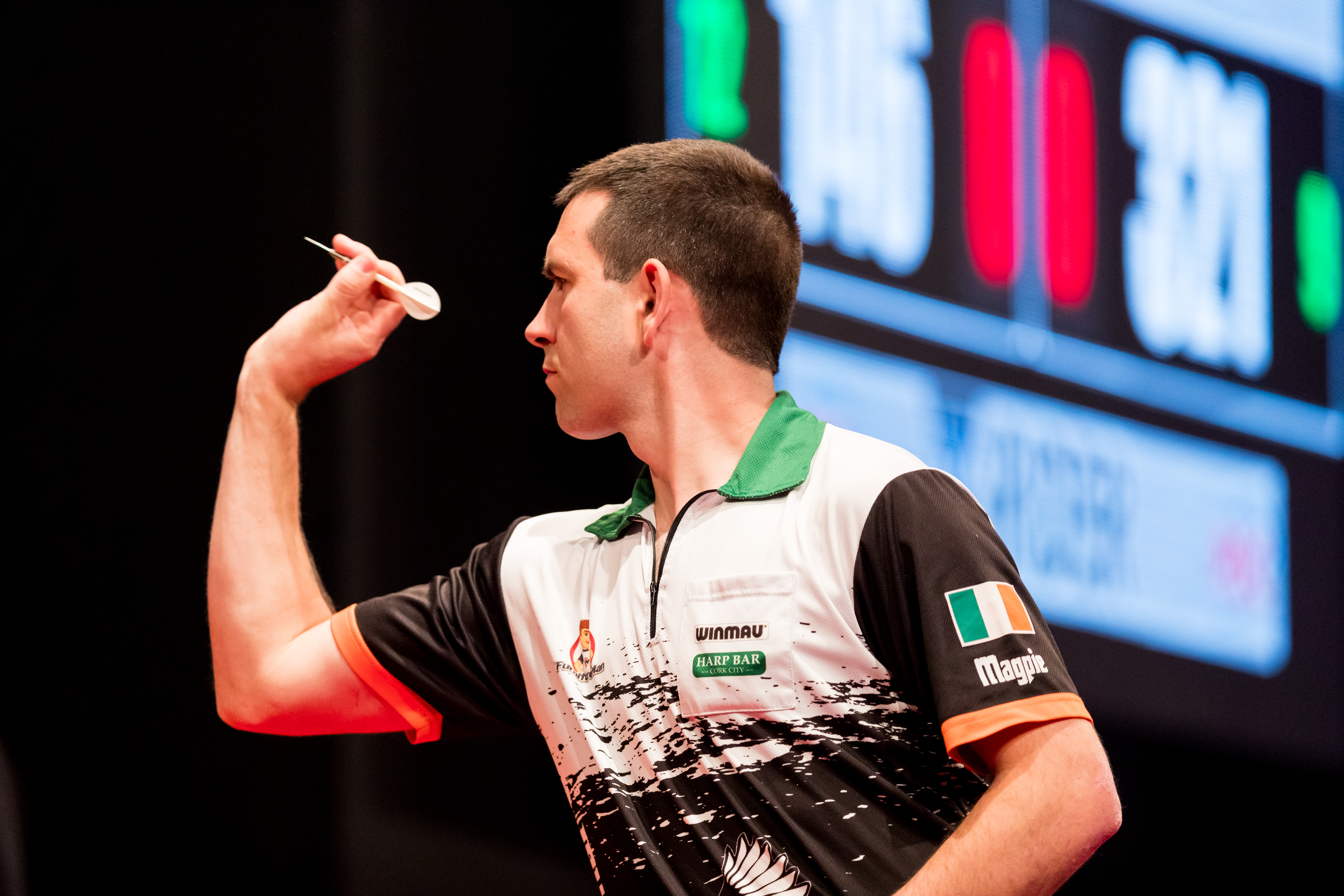
William O'Connor (pictured in 2019) was one of four tournament debutants.

The top 16 players in the two-year PDC World Rankings at the qualification cut-off point were seeded for the tournament. The top 16 players from the one-year PDC Pro Tour rankings, not to have already qualified through the main ranking, were unseeded. The full field was confirmed following Players Championship 24 on 7 July.

Kevin Doets, William O'Connor, Niko Springer and Niels Zonneveld made their debuts at the event. Two-time world champion and 2021 World Matchplay champion Peter Wright failed to qualify for the first time since 2012, while Daryl Gurney missed out for the first time since 2015. Dave Chisnall secured the final qualifying spot by overtaking Gurney in the PDC Pro Tour rankings during Players Championship 24, extending his qualifying streak to 16 years. James Wade, the 2007 champion and seven-time finalist, qualified for his 21st consecutive World Matchplay.

The following players qualified for the tournament. Their placement in the tournament is shown in parentheses.

PDC World Rankings

1. Luke Littler (ENG) (champion)
2. Luke Humphries (ENG) (first round)
3. Gian van Veen (NED) (semi-finals)
4. Michael van Gerwen (NED) (second round)
5. Jonny Clayton (WAL) (second round)
6. James Wade (ENG) (quarter-finals)
7. Gerwyn Price (WAL) (runner-up)
8. Josh Rock (NIR) (quarter-finals)
9. Stephen Bunting (ENG) (second round)
10. Danny Noppert (NED) (first round)
11. Ryan Searle (ENG) (second round)
12. Gary Anderson (SCO) (quarter-finals)
13. Chris Dobey (ENG) (first round)
14. Wessel Nijman (NED) (second round)
15. Ross Smith (ENG) (quarter-finals)
16. Nathan Aspinall (ENG) (second round)

Pro Tour rankings

1. Luke Woodhouse (ENG) (first round)
2. Jermaine Wattimena (NED) (first round)
3. Kevin Doets (NED) (first round)
4. Andrew Gilding (ENG) (first round)
5. Rob Cross (ENG) (second round)
6. Krzysztof Ratajski (POL) (first round)
7. William O'Connor (IRE) (first round)
8. Niko Springer (DEU) (first round)
9. Niels Zonneveld (NED) (first round)
10. Martin Schindler (DEU) (first round)
11. Ryan Joyce (ENG) (first round)
12. Dirk van Duijvenbode (NED) (semi-finals)
13. Cameron Menzies (SCO) (second round - withdrew)
14. Joe Cullen (ENG) (first round)
15. Damon Heta (AUS) (first round)
16. Dave Chisnall (ENG) (first round)

== Summary ==
=== First round ===
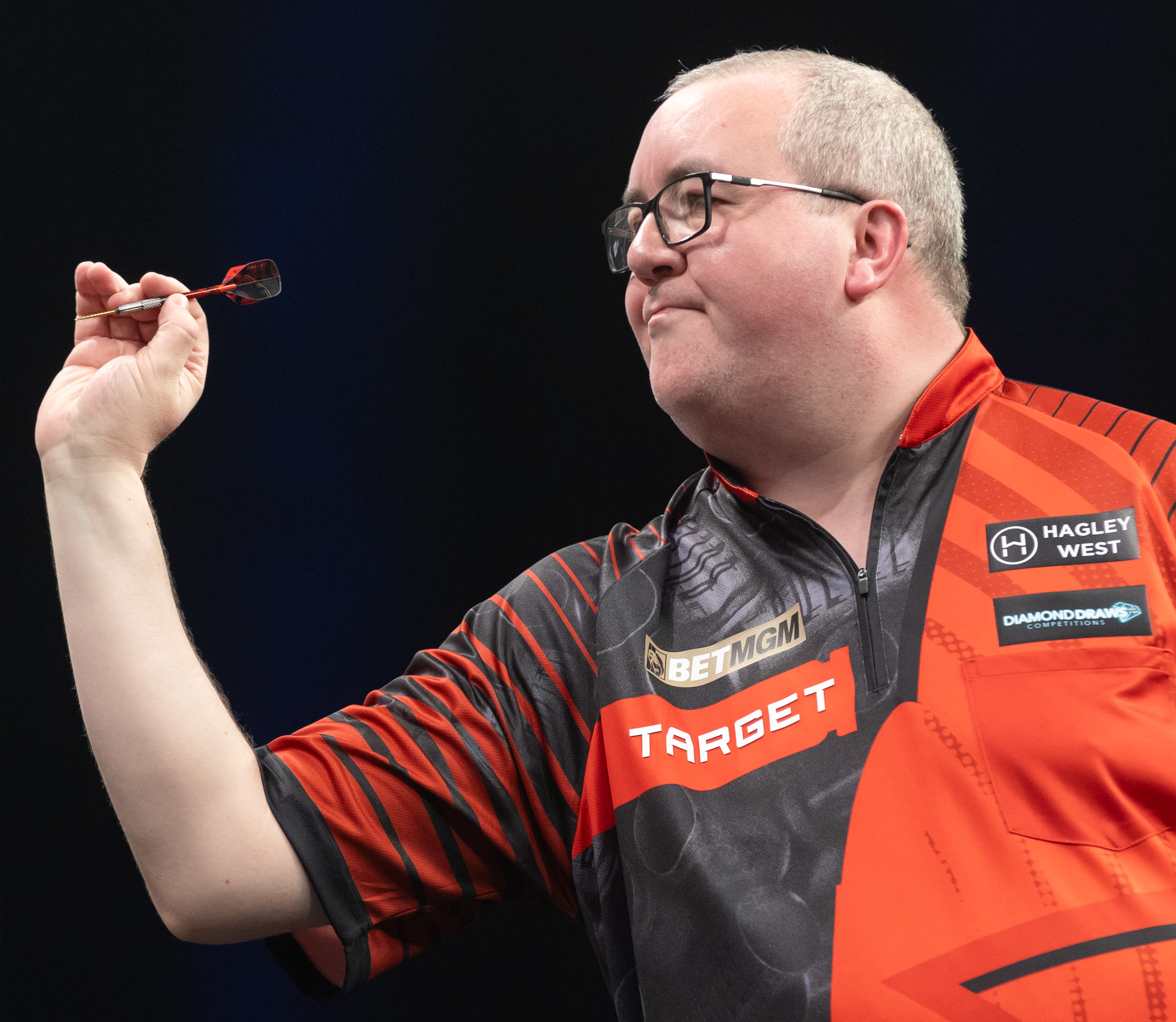
In the first round, ninth seed Stephen Bunting (pictured in 2026) won a sudden-death leg against debutant Niels Zonneveld, who missed three match darts.

The first round (best of 19 legs) began on 18 July. Reigning champion and world number one Luke Littler began his title defence with a 10–6 victory over German debutant Niko Springer. The Englishman trailed Springer 3–2 at the first interval, but won five of the last six legs from 5–5 to secure the win. Littler, who ended the match with a three-dart average of 109.53, found it "annoying" to not have the lead heading into the second break but was satisfied with his performance from then on, stating: "From leg 11 I was on 120 average which goes to show how well I was playing. If I get better I'll be happier." The 2023 champion Nathan Aspinall averaged 105.32 and landed a 167 checkout as he defeated Joe Cullen 10–5 to set up a meeting with Littler in the second round. Stephen Bunting led Niels Zonneveld 8–5 before the Dutch debutant completed back-to-back 10-dart legs and converted a 164 checkout to level the match at 8–8. Zonneveld went on to miss three match darts as the pair entered a sudden-death leg, where Bunting sealed a 13–12 win. Josh Rock was a 10–4 winner against Luke Woodhouse, punishing Woodhouse's 20 missed darts at double.

Three-time champion Michael van Gerwen initially went 4–1 behind against Andrew Gilding, but the Dutchman won nine of the last 11 legs to prevail 10–6. On missing double 12 for a nine-dart finish during the match, Van Gerwen claimed the dart slipped out of his hand, adding: "For me as a dart player, it doesn't really matter if it's nine darts or it's 30 darts." The 2018 champion Gary Anderson averaged 109.96 and compiled finishes of 144 and 141 in his 10–2 victory over Ryan Joyce, winning five consecutive legs to close the match. Chris Dobey hit 13 maximums during his contest with Dirk van Duijvenbode, but the Englishman missed four match darts before entering a tie-break scenario at 9–9, where Van Duijvenbode achieved the two clear legs required to win 13–11 and eliminate the 13th seed. Jonny Clayton converted a 144 checkout to complete a 10–7 win against Damon Heta, advancing to a second-round match against Anderson, who Clayton called his "hero".

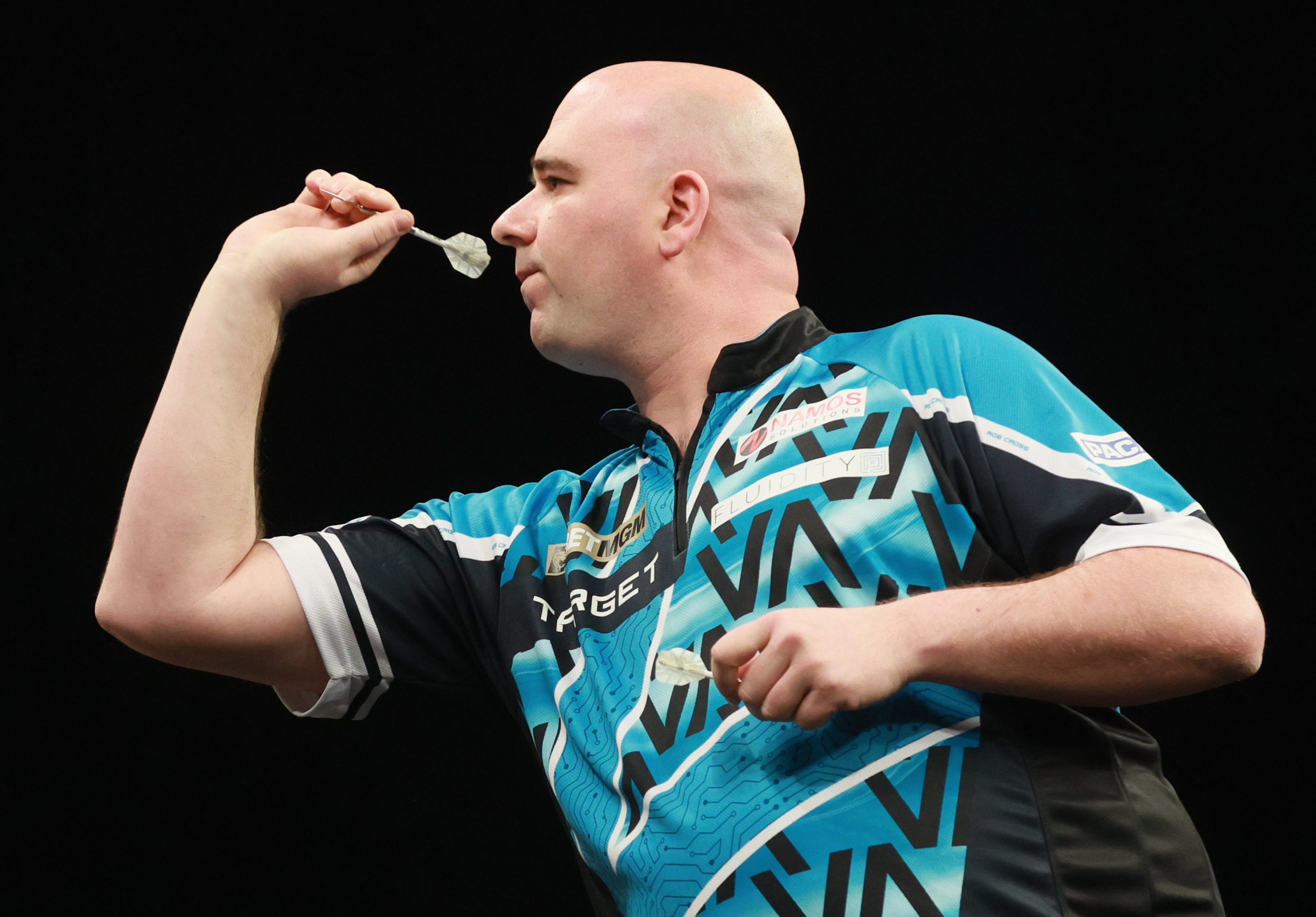
The 2019 champion Rob Cross (pictured in 2025) was one of three unseeded players to win in the first round.

Gian van Veen hit two 144 checkouts and added a 160 finish on his way to beating Krzysztof Ratajski 10–6, exacting revenge for a loss to Ratajski at the European Darts Open the week prior. "Everyone knows I have been struggling the last few months, and I just needed that win today," said Van Veen in his post-match interview. "To go deep here would mean so much confidence for myself going into the back end of this year." Wessel Nijman, the winner of eight PDC titles in 2026 heading into the tournament, set up a meeting with Van Veen by defeating Dave Chisnall 10–5. The 2007 champion James Wade began his 21st consecutive World Matchplay campaign with a 10–7 win over Jermaine Wattimena. Wade branded his performance as "rubbish" and claimed he was "really, really lucky", explaining that he had to slow himself down rather than play to Wattimena's pace on his way to victory. Irish debutant William O'Connor reduced a 6–1 deficit to 8–6 in his match with Ryan Searle, but Searle claimed the last two legs to win 10–6.

Cameron Menzies produced an upset victory to achieve his first win at the World Matchplay, defeating the 2024 champion and world number two Luke Humphries 10–7. Humphries, who was unable to hold his throw in the first six legs that he started, trailed Menzies 8–3 before winning four consecutive legs to reduce the gap to 8–7. However, Menzies won the last two legs, finishing the match with a 170 checkout. "No one gave me hope. I didn't give myself hope but I finally won a game at the Winter Gardens," said the victorious Scot, who called it the "best moment of my darts career". The 2021 world champion Gerwyn Price overcame deficits of 4–0 and 6–2 against Martin Schindler to go ahead for the first time at 9–8, but Schindler converted a 121 finish to take the match to a tie-break. Price sealed a 11–9 comeback win with a 100 checkout to hand Schindler his fifth consecutive World Matchplay defeat. Price admitted the match was one he "should have lost", saying that his confidence levels were down due to a lack of playing time. Despite averaging 104.19, the highest for a debuting player at the World Matchplay, Dutch debutant Kevin Doets suffered a 10–6 loss to Ross Smith, who averaged above the 100 mark himself while hitting 56 per cent of his doubles. The 2019 champion Rob Cross was triumphant in the first round's final match, eliminating tenth seed Danny Noppert in a 10–3 victory. Cross was one of three unseeded players to reach the second round, alongside Van Duijvenbode and Menzies.

=== Second round ===
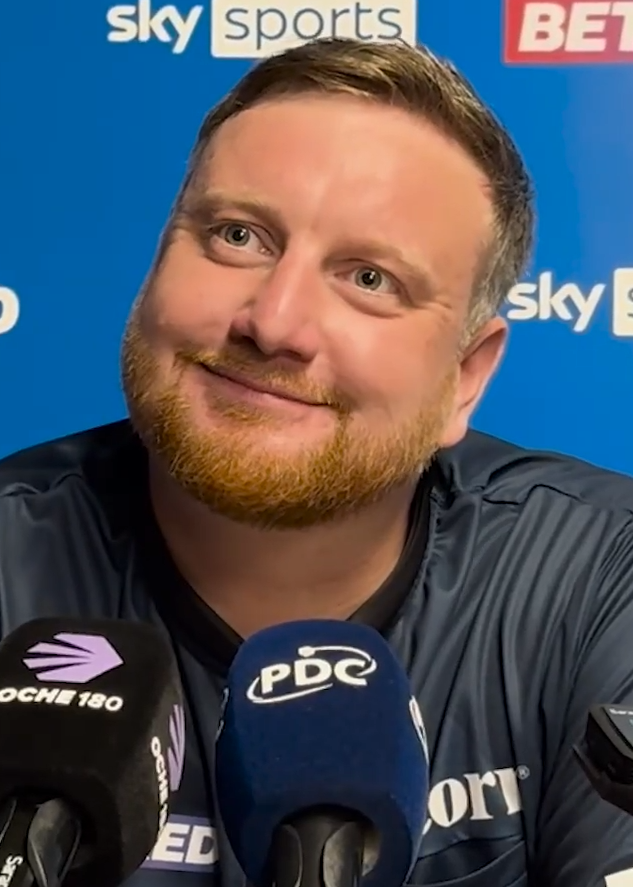
Cameron Menzies (pictured at the event), who eliminated second seed Luke Humphries, was taken off the stage after becoming unwell during his second-round match against Ross Smith. The match was abandoned, with Smith advancing to the quarter-finals.

The second round (best of 21 legs) were played on 21 and 22 July. Luke Littler started his match with Nathan Aspinall by hitting a nine-dart finish in the opening leg. The 11th nine-darter in World Matchplay history, he completed the perfect leg with a 141 checkout on double 15. The defending champion attempted his second nine-darter of the match in the fourth leg, but missed double 15 with his final dart. Despite this, Aspinall kept the match close and found himself level at 7–7. Littler won the next three legs to go one away from victory, but Aspinall converted a dramatic 170 checkout to prolong the contest and reduce the gap to two legs. Littler finally won the match 11–8, recording 14 maximums and a three-dart average of 113.68, the second-highest in tournament history behind Phil Taylor's 114.99 during the 2010 edition. Littler commented that it was "gutting" to not hit two nine-darters in the same match, while Aspinall called it the "most enjoyable game of darts" he had been involved in. Josh Rock set up a meeting with Littler in the next round by defeating Stephen Bunting 11–6, winning the final leg with a 140 checkout. Rock described the match as "one of the toughest games of my life" due to Bunting being one of his best friends on the professional tour.

Dirk van Duijvenbode took an 8–4 lead against Dutch compatriot Michael van Gerwen, but the three-time champion evened the match at 10–10. Taken to his second tie-break of the tournament, Van Duijvenbode secured a 14–12 victory to defeat the fourth seed. "Michael [van Gerwen] came back because I started shaking. Completely afraid like a little child crying for his mum, and I'm just happy in the end that I won it," said Van Duijvenbode, who progressed to his second World Matchplay quarter-final. Van Gerwen's exit saw him drop to number seven in the PDC World Rankings by the end of the tournament, marking his first time outside of the world's top four since January 2013. Gary Anderson overcame a slow start against Jonny Clayton, going 4–1 behind before completing a 11–7 win to reach the quarter-finals for the first time in six years.

During the fourth leg of the match between Ross Smith and Cameron Menzies, in which the latter led 2–1, Menzies became unwell and was helped off the stage by Smith and the match officials. In a statement, the PDC revealed that Menzies experienced high blood pressure, leading to him feeling dizzy and subsequently fainting. Although he was deemed well enough to return to his accommodation, the match was abandoned and Smith was awarded a place in the quarter-finals. After losing the first session 3–2, Gerwyn Price won six consecutive legs to take an 8–3 lead against Rob Cross, eventually prevailing 11–5 to progress to a quarter-final meeting with Smith.

Entering a tie-break against fellow Dutchman Gian van Veen, Wessel Nijman went 11–10 ahead and left 64 to triumph, only for Van Veen to hit a 148 checkout and level the match. Following a break of throw, Van Veen secured a 14–12 victory to end Nijman's hopes of a maiden major quarter-final. James Wade was the last player to confirm a place in the last eight, defeating Ryan Searle 11–8 to advance to his 14th World Matchplay quarter-final.

=== Quarter-finals ===
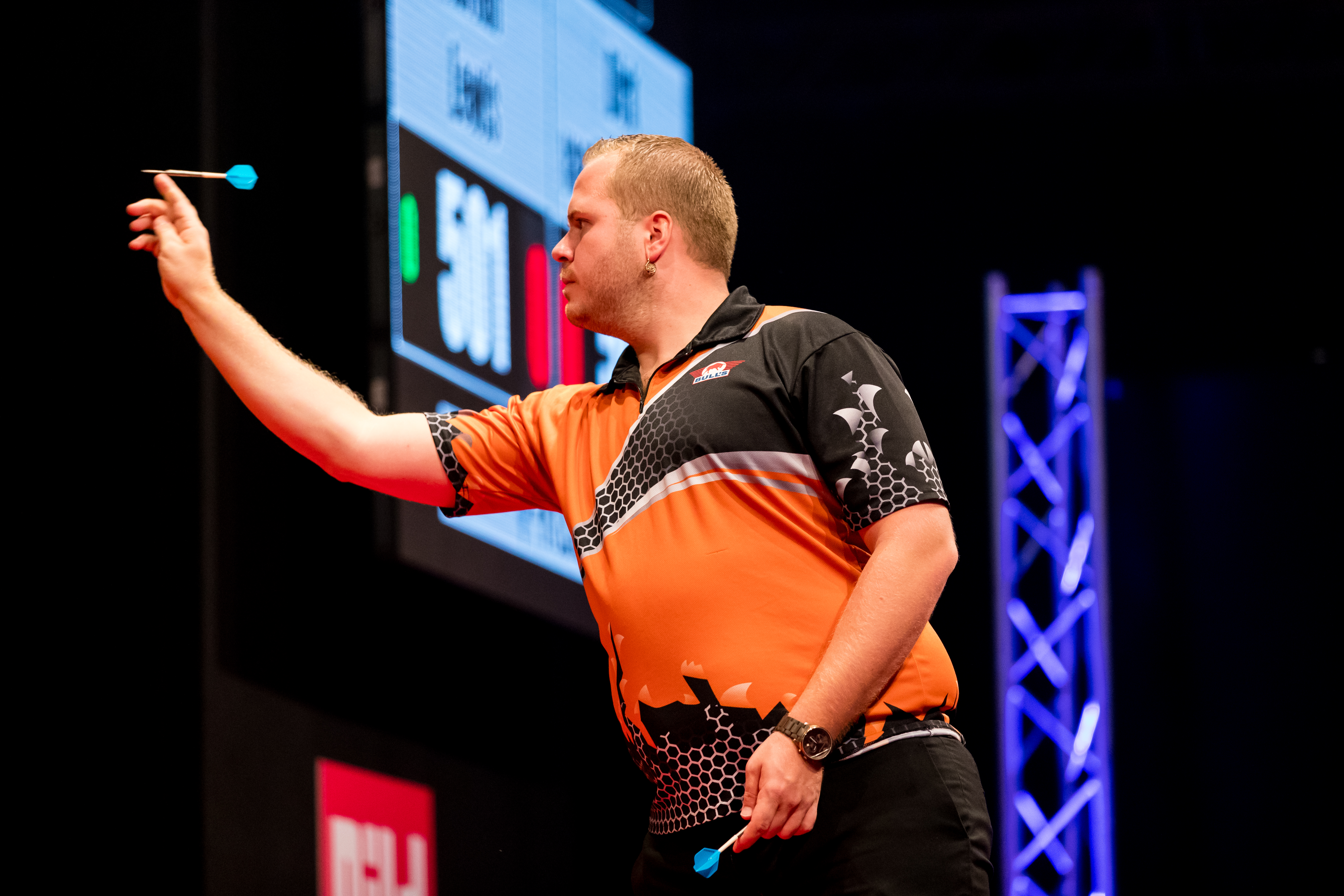
After eliminating three-time champion Michael van Gerwen in the second round, Dirk van Duijvenbode (pictured in 2019) reached his first World Matchplay semi-final by defeating Gary Anderson 16–13.

The quarter-finals (best of 31 legs) were played on 23 and 24 July. Much like his second-round match with Michael van Gerwen, Dirk van Duijvenbode started the first quarter-final by taking an initial 8–4 lead against Gary Anderson. He established an eight-leg buffer at 14–6 and went one leg away from victory at 15–8. Anderson then staged a comeback by winning five consecutive legs, including a 154 checkout. However, Van Duijvenbode hit double 10 in the 29th leg to complete a 16–13 victory. In his post-match interview, the unseeded Dutchman highlighted Anderson's willingness to never give up and said "when he's hitting his trebles, he is one of the very best in the world", also adding that he felt nerves in his stomach during the contest.

In the second quarter-final, Luke Littler faced Josh Rock in a rematch of their 2025 semi-final. The match was closely contested for the first 10 legs as the pair found themselves level at 5–5, but Littler won five legs in a row to enter the third interval with a 10–5 lead, later extending this advantage to 12–5. At 15–7, Rock missed five darts at double to keep the match alive, allowing Littler to pin double 10 to beat the Northern Irishman 16–7. Littler, who achieved his third consecutive average above 109, hit 17 maximums and converted 53 per cent of his doubles, while Rock averaged 101.24 in defeat. "I feel really good up on the stage. Preparations beforehand have gone really well, just relaxing, playing and relaxing again," said Littler afterwards. "As long as I can keep it up, I'm sure I will dominate. Next game, let's get it back up to the 113s [averages]."

Gerwyn Price won each of the first four sessions of his match with Ross Smith by a 3–2 scoreline, entering the final session with a 12–8 lead. Although Smith drew level by claiming the next four legs in succession, Price closed the match with his own four-leg run that included a 121 checkout on the bullseye and a 91 checkout for an 11-dart break of throw, culminating in a 16–12 win. "For him to get back to 12–12, I thought 'here we go again', but thankfully I rode off four legs on the bounce," commented Price afterwards.

In the last quarter-final, Gian van Veen and James Wade endured a slow start to their match, interrupted by Van Veen converting a 160 checkout to go 9–6 ahead. From 11–7, Wade won four consecutive legs, including a 121 checkout, to even the score at 11–11. Van Veen hit a 118 checkout for a 14–12 lead, but Wade immediately responded with another 121 finish. This ended up being Wade's last leg of the contest, as Van Veen completed a 16–13 victory—a reversal of Wade's 16–13 win over Van Veen the previous year—to progress to the semi-finals. The Dutch victor called the match a "tight battle" and hoped for a better performance in the semi-finals, insisting that his finishing got him through the tie.

=== Semi-finals ===
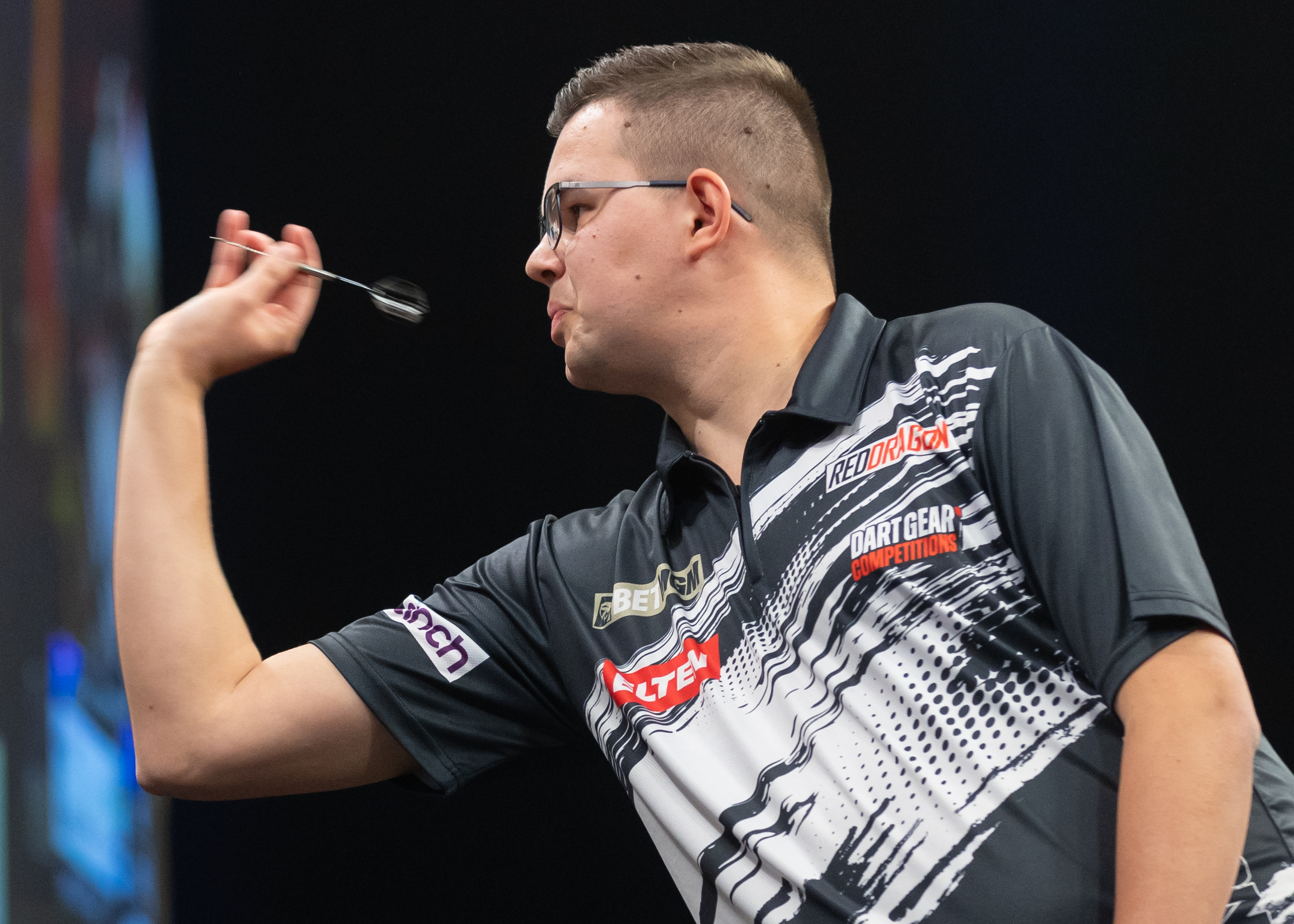
Third seed Gian van Veen (pictured in 2026) reached his first World Matchplay semi-final.

The semi-finals (best of 33 legs) were played on 25 July. Gerwyn Price and Luke Littler both contested their second World Matchplay semi-final; Price last reached the final four when he finished as runner-up at the 2022 edition, while Littler reached his first semi-final on his way to winning the title in 2025. They faced first-time semi-finalists Gian van Veen and Dirk van Duijvenbode, respectively.

In the first semi-final, Price found a break of throw in the opening leg and hit a 125 checkout to take a 4–1 lead. He extended this lead to 6–1 before Van Veen won four consecutive legs to reduce the gap to 6–5. Entering the final session with an 11–9 advantage, Price took the next four legs in a row to establish a comfortable 15–9 buffer, eventually securing a 17–10 victory. The match was marked by frustrations when it came to finishing, with both players missing 23 darts at double. The win meant that Price was guaranteed to rise to number four in the PDC World Rankings, overtaking Jonny Clayton to reclaim his position as the Welsh number one. In his post-match interview, Price stated that he was happy to be in the final after six months of not playing as much darts as he should have, and joked that he was more happy to be Welsh number one, calling it a "one up on my buddy Jonny [Clayton]".

In the second semi-final, Littler went 4–1 ahead in the first session, soon extending this lead to 8–2 as he threatened Phil Taylor's single-match average record, averaging 117.10 up to that point. Van Duijvenbode responded with a 146 checkout in the next leg, but Littler later converted a 130 finish to go 12–3 in front. He entered the final interval with a 16–4 lead, only needing one leg to prevail. Van Duijvenbode was able to take the match to a 22nd leg, where Littler completed a 17–5 win. The defending champion finished the match with a three-dart average of 110.88, his fourth consecutive average above the 109 mark, as well as 16 maximums and a 50 per cent success rate on his doubles. "I saw the average on the screen at one point of 117, but it was another good performance, and it [the average] keeps going up," said Littler after the match. On his semi-final opponent, Littler commented: "I said to Dirk [van Duijvenbode] 'well played', it was a good tournament for himself, he has made it to a major semi-final, so full credit to him."

=== Final ===
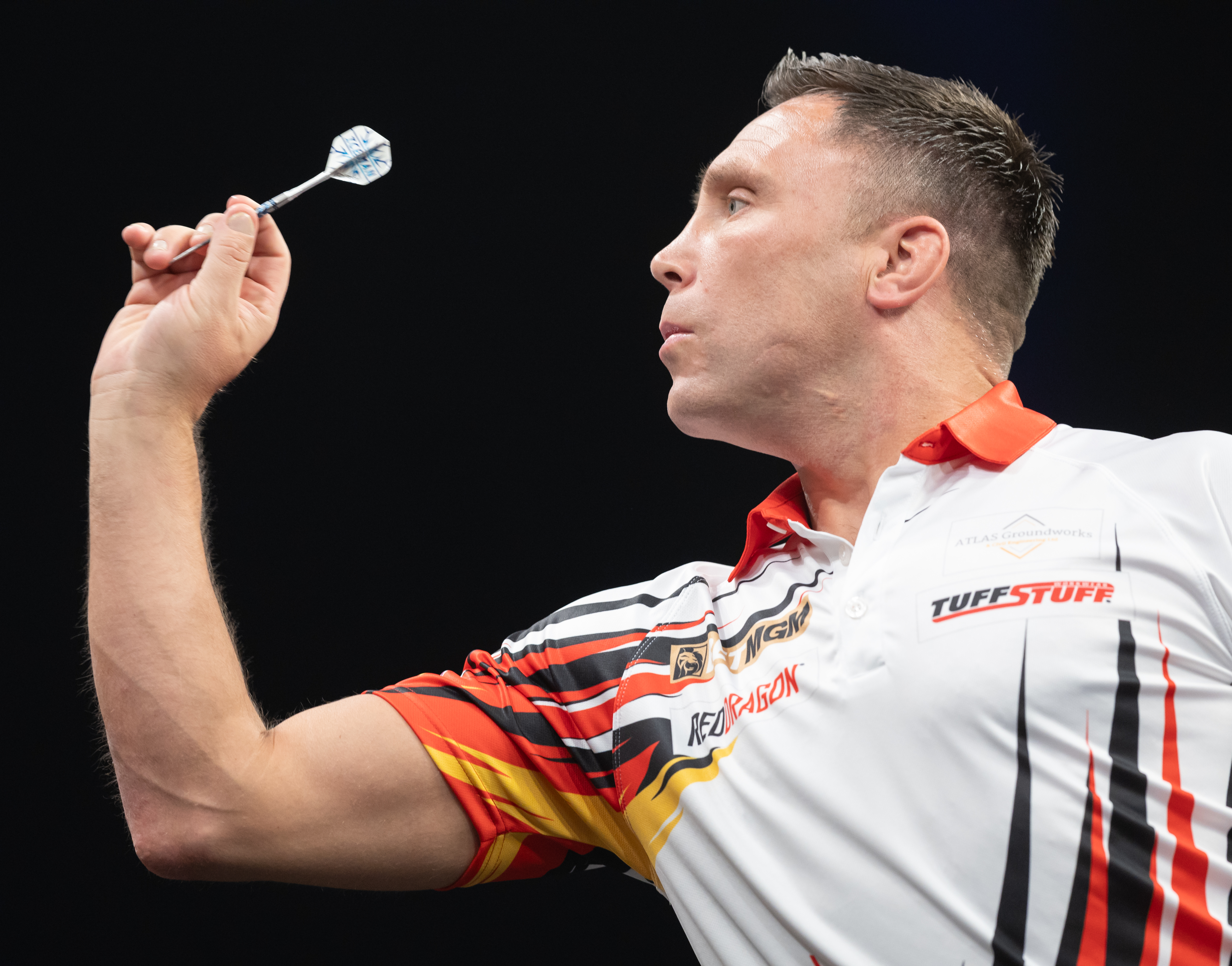
Seventh seed Gerwyn Price (pictured in 2026) contested his second World Matchplay final.

The final (best of 35 legs) between top seed Luke Littler and seventh seed Gerwyn Price was played on 26 July. Defending champion Littler contested his second straight World Matchplay final, while Price reached his second final after his first in 2022, where he lost 18–14 to Michael van Gerwen. It also marked Price's first major ranking final since 2023. Heading into the contest, Littler had won his last nine matches against Price, last suffering a defeat to the Welshman at the 2026 Bahrain Darts Masters. Discussing a potential meeting with Littler in the final, Price previously stated that he thought he could be the player to get to Littler's level, saying that other players "make it a little bit too easy for him" by letting him play to his rhythm. "I really believe that if I hit my A-game, it doesn't matter who I play, I'm winning, simple as that," said Price after his semi-final win, before telling people not to underestimate him in the final. Following his victory over Dirk van Duijvenbode, Littler recounted "great games" against Price at the 2025 World Grand Prix and during the 2026 Premier League, concluding: "I think Gezzy [Price] will want to get me into a roaring battle tomorrow, but as long as I can get into the lead, I'll be happy."

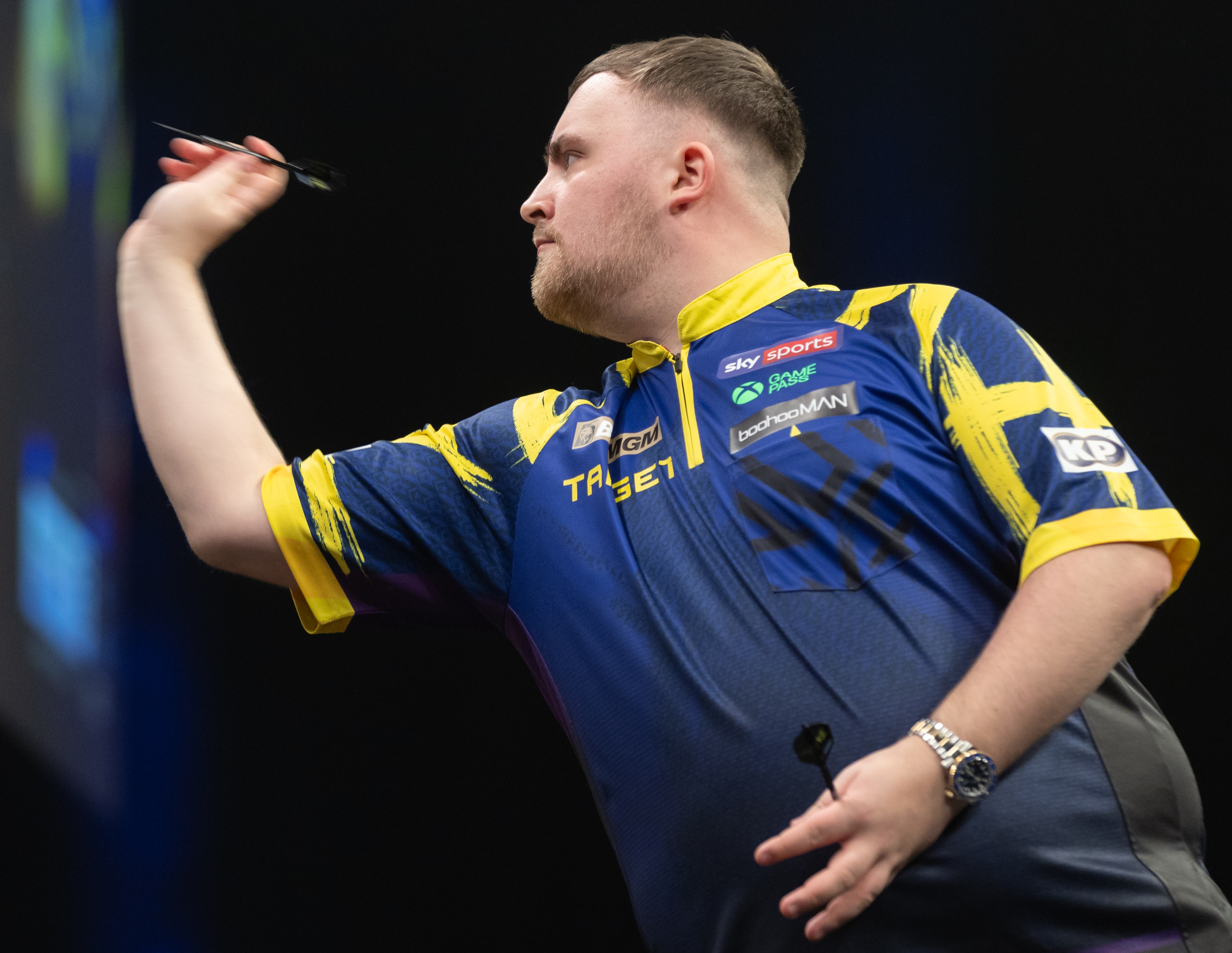
Defending champion Luke Littler (pictured in 2026) became the fourth player to retain the World Matchplay title.

Littler established a 4–1 lead in the final's opening session, including a 167 checkout, which was his first bullseye finish of the tournament. From 7–3 in front, Littler completed the next four legs in a total of 47 darts, hitting checkouts of 128 and 127 on his way to an 11–3 lead. Price won six of the next 10 legs to cut the gap to 15–9. Littler then converted a 148 checkout, his sixth and final ton-plus finish of the match, followed by a break of throw. He completed an 18–9 victory, his 10th consecutive win against Price, with an 81 checkout on the bullseye. Littler finished the final with a three-dart average of 111.53, setting a new record for the highest average in a World Matchplay final, beating Phil Taylor's 111.23 average in the 2013 final. He hit 12 maximums to take his total count for the tournament to 66, improving on his record of 64 from the previous year. Price averaged 104.92 in defeat, which became the second-highest losing average in a World Matchplay final.

Littler won his second World Matchplay title and his 14th PDC major singles title. The 19-year-old continued his streak of claiming ranking major titles in 2026, having already won the World Championship, World Masters, and the UK Open, along with the unranked Premier League and World Cup. He became the fourth player to retain the title, after Rod Harrington, Taylor, and Van Gerwen, as well the first to achieve the feat since Van Gerwen in 2016. He finished the competition with an overall tournament average of 111.04, surpassing Taylor's 106.31 mark in 2010 as the highest winning tournament average in World Matchplay history. Littler's run to the final resulted in him becoming the first player to pass £3 million in the PDC World Rankings; he received the top prize of £225,000 for the victory, taking his total ranking to £3,143,500. Speaking after the final, Littler called his World Matchplay campaign "one of the best weeks of [his] life" where he "played some of the best darts of [his] life". He discussed the possibility of winning all PDC major titles in 2026, reiterating his promise to participate in Pro Tour events in order to qualify for the Players Championship Finals in November. "I don't think my dad's too happy because we were going to go to Spain and I think we've got to go to Leicester now and play some Pro Tours, but it is what it is," he said. Speaking in defeat, Price praised his final opponent, calling him "one in a million" and someone who is "fantastic for this sport". "I hope there is nobody else like him coming through, because he is ridiculous," he added.

== Schedule ==
The event was held over nine days from 18 July to the date of the final on Sunday, 26 July. The tournament schedule was announced on 12 July. The figures to the right of a player's name state their three-dart average in a match. Players in bold denote match winners.

Saturday, 18 July

Match #	Round	Player 1	Scor	Player 2	Break 1	Break 2
01	1	**Josh Rock 90.42**	**10** – 4	Luke Woodhouse 88.83	3 – 2	8 – 2
02	1	**Stephen Bunting 94.49**	**13** – 12	Niels Zonneveld 91.29	3 – 2	6 – 4
03	1	**Luke Littler 109.53**	**10** – 6	Niko Springer 97.65	2 – 3	5 – 5
04	1	**Nathan Aspinall 105.32**	**10** – 5	Joe Cullen 95.79	3 – 2	6 – 4

Sunday, 19 July

Match #	Round	Player 1	Score	Player 2	Break 1	Break 2
05	1	Chris Dobey 97.35	11 – **13**	**Dirk van Duijvenbode 92.78**	3 – 2	4 – 6
06	1	**Gary Anderson 109.96**	**10** – 2	Ryan Joyce 95.49	4 – 1	8 – 2
07	1	**Michael van Gerwen 94.85**	**10** – 6	Andrew Gilding 88.54	1 – 4	5 – 5
08	1	**Jonny Clayton 97.63**	**10** – 7	Damon Heta 96.10	3 – 2	7 – 3
09	1	**Ryan Searle 94.98**	**10** – 6	William O'Connor 95.18	4 – 1	7 – 3
10	1	**James Wade 96.19**	**10** – 7	Jermaine Wattimena 92.87	4 – 1	6 – 4
11	1	**Gian van Veen 93.55**	**10** – 6	Krzysztof Ratajski 95.55	3 – 2	7 – 3
12	1	**Wessel Nijman 98.63**	**10** – 5	Dave Chisnall 94.47	4 – 1	7 – 3

Monday, 20 July

Match #	Round	Player 1	Score	Player 2	Break 1	Break 2
13	1	**Ross Smith 100.55**	**10** – 6	Kevin Doets 104.19	5 – 0	6 – 4
14	1	**Gerwyn Price 93.88**	**11** – 9	Martin Schindler 90.69	1 – 4	4 – 6
15	1	Luke Humphries 99.56	7 – **10**	**Cameron Menzies 97.83**	2 – 3	3 – 7
16	1	Danny Noppert 91.80	3 – **10**	**Rob Cross 97.41**	0 – 5	2 – 8

Tuesday, 21 July

Match #	Round	Player 1	Score	Player 2	Break 1	Break 2
17	2	Jonny Clayton 97.72	7 – **11**	**Gary Anderson 98.13**	4 – 1	4 – 6
18	2	Michael van Gerwen 99.49	12 – **14**	**Dirk van Duijvenbode 95.93**	3 – 2	4 – 6
19	2	**Luke Littler 113.68**	**11** – 8	Nathan Aspinall 101.24	3 – 2	6 – 4
20	2	**Josh Rock 91.18**	**11** – 6	Stephen Bunting 82.90	2 – 3	6 – 4

Wednesday, 22 July

Match #	Round	Player 1	Score	Player 2	Break 1	Break 2
21	2	Cameron Menzies 97.02	**w/o** (Note: The match was stopped on medical grounds during the fourth leg, with Menzies leading 2–1. Menzies withdrew from the match, with Smith being awarded the victory.)	**Ross Smith** 100.16	—N/a	
22	2	**Gian van Veen 96.95**	**14** – 12	Wessel Nijman 97.44	4 – 1	5 – 5
23	2	**Gerwyn Price 97.84**	**11** – 5	Rob Cross 93.82	2 – 3	7 – 3
24	2	**James Wade 99.85**	**11** – 8	Ryan Searle 95.76	3 – 2	5 – 5

Thursday, 23 July

Match #	Round	Player 1	Score	Player 2	Break 1	Break 2	Break 3	Break 4
25	QF	**Dirk van Duijvenbode 101.49**	**16** – 13	Gary Anderson 101.32	4 – 1	7 – 3	9 – 6	14 – 6
26	QF	**Luke Littler 109.57**	**16** – 7	Josh Rock 101.24	3 – 2	5 – 5	10 – 5	13 – 7

Friday, 24 July

Match #	Round	Player 1	Score	Player 2	Break 1	Break 2	Break 3	Break 4
27	QF	Ross Smith 98.16	12 – **16**	**Gerwyn Price 102.78**	2 – 3	4 – 6	6 – 9	8 – 12
28	QF	**Gian van Veen 93.04**	**16** – 13	James Wade 97.05	3 – 2	6 – 4	9 – 6	11 – 9

Saturday, 25 July

Match #	Round	Player 1	Score	Player 2	Break 1	Break 2	Break 3	Break 4
29	SF	**Gerwyn Price 96.65**	**17** – 10	Gian van Veen 91.62	4 – 1	6 – 4	9 – 6	11 – 9
30	SF	**Luke Littler 110.88**	**17** – 5	Dirk van Duijvenbode 92.02	4 – 1	8 – 2	12 – 3	16 – 4

Sunday, 26 July

Match #	Round	Player 1	Score	Player 2	Break 1	Break 2	Break 3	Break 4	Break 5
31	F	**Luke Littler 111.53**	**18** – 9	Gerwyn Price 104.97	4 – 1	7 – 3	11 – 4	14 – 6	16 – 9

== Draw ==
The draw was announced on 9 July. Numbers to the left of players' names show the seedings for the top 16 in the tournament.

First round (best of 19 legs); 18–20 July
1	Luke Littler 109.53	10
Niko Springer 97.65	6
16	Nathan Aspinall 105.32	10
Joe Cullen 95.79	5
8	Josh Rock 90.42	10
Luke Woodhouse 88.83	4
9	Stephen Bunting 94.49	13
Niels Zonneveld 91.29	12
4	Michael van Gerwen 94.85	10
Andrew Gilding 88.54	6
13	Chris Dobey 97.35	11
Dirk van Duijvenbode 92.78	13
5	Jonny Clayton 97.63	10
Damon Heta 96.10	7
12	Gary Anderson 109.96	10
Ryan Joyce 95.49	2
2	Luke Humphries 99.56	7
Cameron Menzies 97.83	10
15	Ross Smith 100.55	10
Kevin Doets 104.19	6
7	Gerwyn Price 93.88	11
Martin Schindler 90.69	9
10	Danny Noppert 91.80	3
Rob Cross 97.41	10
3	Gian van Veen 93.55	10
Krzysztof Ratajski 95.55	6
14	Wessel Nijman 98.63	10
Dave Chisnall 94.47	5
6	James Wade 96.19	10
Jermaine Wattimena 92.87	7
11	Ryan Searle 94.98	10
William O'Connor 95.18	6

Second round (best of 21 legs); 21–22 July
1	Luke Littler 113.68	11
16	Nathan Aspinall 101.24	8
8	Josh Rock 91.18	11
9	Stephen Bunting 82.90	6
4	Michael van Gerwen 99.49	12
Dirk van Duijvenbode 95.93	14
5	Jonny Clayton 97.72	7
12	Gary Anderson 98.13	11
Cameron Menzies
15	Ross Smith	w/o
7	Gerwyn Price 97.84	11
Rob Cross 93.82	5
3	Gian van Veen 96.95	14
14	Wessel Nijman 97.44	12
6	James Wade 99.85	11
11	Ryan Searle 95.76	8

Quarter-finals (best of 31 legs); 23–24 July
1	Luke Littler 109.57	16
8	Josh Rock 101.24	7
Dirk van Duijvenbode 101.49	16
12	Gary Anderson 101.32	13
15	Ross Smith 98.16	12
7	Gerwyn Price 102.78	16
3	Gian van Veen 93.04	16
6	James Wade 97.05	13

Semi-finals (best of 33 legs); 25 July
1	Luke Littler 110.88	17
Dirk van Duijvenbode 92.02	5
7	Gerwyn Price 96.65	17
3	Gian van Veen 91.62	10

Final (best of 35 legs); 26 July
1	Luke Littler 111.53	18
7	Gerwyn Price 104.97	9
