= 2025 Dutch Darts Championship =

2025 Elten Safety Shoes Dutch Darts Championship

Tournament information
- Dates: 23–25 May 2025
- Venue: Autotron
- Location: Rosmalen, Netherlands
- Organisation(s): Professional Darts Corporation (PDC)
- Format: Legs
- Prize fund: £175,000
- Winner's share: £30,000
- High checkout: 170; Dirk van Duijvenbode; Niko Springer

Champion(s)
- Jonny Clayton

The 2025 Dutch Darts Championship (known for sponsorship reasons as the 2025 Elten Safety Shoes Dutch Darts Championship) was the seventh of fourteen PDC European Tour events on the 2025 PDC Pro Tour. The tournament took place at the Autotron, Rosmalen, Netherlands, from 23 to 25 May 2025. It featured a field of 48 players and £175,000 in prize money, with £30,000 going to the winner.

Josh Rock was the defending champion after defeating Jonny Clayton 8–4 in the 2024 final. However, he lost 6–4 to Ricardo Pietreczko in the second round.

Clayton won the title, his third on the European Tour, by defeating Niko Springer 8–6 in the final.

== Prize money ==
The prize fund remained at £175,000, with £30,000 to the winner:

Stage (num. of players)		Prize money
Winner	(1)	£30,000
Runner-up	(1)	£12,000
Semi-finalists	(2)	£8,000
Quarter-finalists	(4)	£6,000
Third round losers	(8)	£4,000
Second round losers	(16)	£2,500*
First round losers	(16)	£1,250*
Total	£175,000	

- Pre-qualified players from the Orders of Merit who lose in their first match of the event shall not be credited with prize money on any Order of Merit. A player who qualifies as a qualifier, but later becomes a seed due to the withdrawal of one or more other players shall be credited with their prize money on all Orders of Merit regardless of how far they progress in the event.

== Qualification and format ==
In a change from the previous year, the top 16 on the two-year main PDC Order of Merit ranking were now seeded and entered the tournament in the second round, while the 16 qualifiers from the one-year PDC Pro Tour Order of Merit ranking entered in the first round.

In another change, the 16 Pro Tour Order of Merit qualifiers will be drawn against one of the 16 other qualifiers in the first round.

The seedings were confirmed on 9 May.

The remaining 16 places went to players from four qualifying events – 10 from the Tour Card Holder Qualifier (held on 14 May), four from the Host Nation Qualifier (held on 22 May), one from the Nordic & Baltic Associate Member Qualifier (held on 9 May), and one from the East European Associate Member Qualifier (held on 15 February).

Rob Cross and Gary Anderson withdrew and were replaced by Ricardo Pietreczko and Martin Lukeman. Ryan Searle and Michael Smith moved up to become the 15th and 16th seeds respectively. After the draw was made, Gerwyn Price withdrew and was replaced by William O'Connor, who went straight in at the second round. Michael van Gerwen withdrew during the tournament, meaning Mickey Mansell received a bye to the third round.

The following players took part in the tournament:

Seeded Players

1. Luke Humphries (semi-finals)
2. ~~Michael van Gerwen~~ (withdrew)
3. Stephen Bunting (second round)
4. Jonny Clayton (champion)
5. Damon Heta (third round)
6. Chris Dobey (second round)
7. James Wade (second round)
8. ~~Gerwyn Price~~ (withdrew)
9. Dave Chisnall (second round)
10. Peter Wright (second round)
11. Josh Rock (second round)
12. Danny Noppert (quarter-finals)
13. Ross Smith (third round)
14. Martin Schindler (third round)
15. Ryan Searle (quarter-finals)
16. Michael Smith (third round)

Pro Tour Order of Merit Qualifiers
- Gian van Veen (first round)
- Cameron Menzies (second round)
- Mike De Decker (first round)
- Wessel Nijman (semi-finals)
- Dirk van Duijvenbode (third round)
- Andrew Gilding (first round)
- Daryl Gurney (third round)
- Luke Woodhouse (first round)
- Raymond van Barneveld (second round)
- Jermaine Wattimena (first round)
- Joe Cullen (first round)
- Ritchie Edhouse (third round)
- Ryan Joyce (second round)
- Niels Zonneveld (first round)
- Ricardo Pietreczko (quarter-finals)

Tour Card Qualifier
- Wesley Plaisier (first round)
- Max Hopp (second round)
- Mario Vandenbogaerde (second round)
- Niko Springer (runner-up)
- Karel Sedláček (first round)
- Maik Kuivenhoven (first round)
- Lukas Wenig (first round)
- Mickey Mansell (third round)
- Kim Huybrechts (first round)
- Ryan Meikle (second round)

Host Nation Qualifier
- Jeffrey Sparidaans (second round)
- Jerry Hendriks (first round)
- Jeffrey de Zwaan (first round)
- Berry van Peer (first round)

Nordic & Baltic Qualifier
- Teemu Harju (first round)

East European Qualifier
- Boris Krčmar (second round)

Reserve List
- Martin Lukeman (second round)
- William O'Connor (quarter-finals)

== Draw ==
First round (best of 11 legs); 23 May
Cameron Menzies 93.39	6
Wesley Plaisier 93.16	5
Ryan Joyce 84.39	6
Jeffrey de Zwaan 85.57	5
Gian van Veen 88.13	5
Boris Krčmar 100.86	6
Ritchie Edhouse 81.12	6
Kim Huybrechts 86.69	5
Luke Woodhouse 84.86	3
Max Hopp 87.43	6
Raymond van Barneveld 97.63	6
Jerry Hendriks 84.72	5
Andrew Gilding 84.72	2
Jeffrey Sparidaans 92.19	6
Niels Zonneveld 96.46	4
Mario Vandenbogaerde 99.76	6
Mike De Decker 95.32	5
Mickey Mansell 94.52	6
Joe Cullen 82.69	1
Ryan Meikle 89.45	6
Dirk van Duijvenbode 102.48	6
Teemu Harju 85.61	0
Wessel Nijman 97.91	6
Berry van Peer 90.44	5
Jermaine Wattimena 94.49	3
Niko Springer 99.43	6
Martin Lukeman 96.84	6
Lukas Wenig 88.18	2
Daryl Gurney 90.02	6
Maik Kuivenhoven 84.93	4
Ricardo Pietreczko 96.14	6
Karel Sedláček 91.89	1

Second round (best of 11 legs); 24 May
1	Luke Humphries 105.76	6
Cameron Menzies 97.08	5
16	Michael Smith 98.23	6
Ryan Joyce 95.56	5
Alt	William O'Connor 97.73	6
Boris Krčmar 91.74	3
9	Dave Chisnall 99.10	5
Ritchie Edhouse 94.89	6
4	Jonny Clayton 99.98	6
Max Hopp 92.46	2
13	Ross Smith 99.40	6
Raymond van Barneveld 84.85	2
5	Damon Heta 100.06	6
Jeffrey Sparidaans 95.21	3
12	Danny Noppert 98.12	6
Mario Vandenbogaerde 95.53	2
2	Michael van Gerwen	w/d
Mickey Mansell	w/o
15	Ryan Searle 99.87	6
Ryan Meikle 99.50	4
7	James Wade 95.83	3
Dirk van Duijvenbode 98.68	6
10	Peter Wright 82.62	1
Wessel Nijman 96.53	6
3	Stephen Bunting 89.57	5
Niko Springer 91.90	6
14	Martin Schindler 102.72	6
Martin Lukeman 97.63	4
6	Chris Dobey 97.02	5
Daryl Gurney 97.56	6
11	Josh Rock 91.16	4
Ricardo Pietreczko 93.26	6

Third round (best of 11 legs); 25 May
1	Humphries 104.86	6
16	M Smith 88.70	0
Alt	O'Connor 97.12	6
Edhouse 94.81	3
4	Clayton 89.60	6
13	R Smith 94.73	5
5	Heta 90.33	5
12	Noppert 94.96	6
Mansell 78.26	0
15	Searle 91.09	6
van Duijvenbode 97.89	5
Nijman 99.45	6
Springer 102.84	6
14	Schindler 88.38	2
Gurney 99.48	5
Pietreczko 99.93	6

Quarter-finals (best of 11 legs); 25 May
1	Humphries 108.72	6
Alt	O'Connor 95.44	3
4	Clayton 106.85	6
12	Noppert 107.19	4
15	Searle 101.43	1
Nijman 102.22	6
Springer 107.56	6
Pietreczko 97.03	2

Semi-finals (best of 13 legs); 25 May
1	Humphries 99.80	5
4	Clayton 98.08	7
Nijman 87.77	3
Springer 103.00	7

Final (best of 15 legs); 25 May
4	Clayton 98.69	8
Springer 98.54	6
