= Callan Rydz =

English darts player (born 1998)

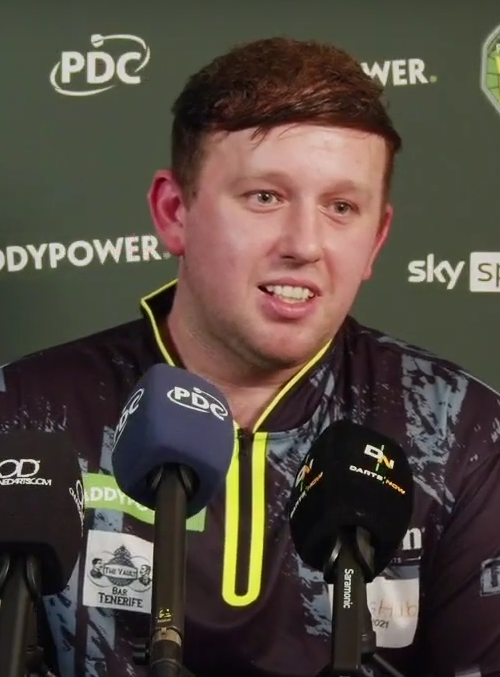
- Rydz at the 2025 World Championship

Personal information
- Nickname: "The Riot"
- Born: 3 July 1998 (age 28) Newcastle upon Tyne, England
- Home town: Bedlington, England

Sport
- Sport: Darts
- Playing since: 2013
- Darts: 22g Unicorn Signature
- Laterality: Right-handed
- Walk-on music: "Hypersonic Missiles" by Sam Fender

Organisation (see split in darts)
- PDC: 2017–present (Tour Card: 2020–present)
- Current world ranking: (PDC) 40 ▼2 (29 October 2026)

WDF major events – best performances
- World Masters: Last 144: 2016

PDC premier events – best performances
- World Championship: Quarter-final: 2022, 2025
- World Matchplay: Quarter-final: 2021
- World Grand Prix: Last 32: 2021, 2022, 2023
- UK Open: Last 16: 2022
- European Championship: Last 32: 2021
- PC Finals: Quarter-final: 2022
- Masters: Last 24: 2023

Other tournament wins
- Years
Finder Masters Youth	2014
PDC Challenge Tour	2019 (x2)
PDC Development Tour (x2)	2019, 2020
Players Championships (x3)
2021 (x2), 2023

Callan Rydz (/rɪdz/ born 3 July 1998) is an English professional darts player who competes in Professional Darts Corporation (PDC) events. He has won three PDC ranking titles and is a two-time PDC World Championship quarter-finalist.

Rydz topped the 2019 PDC Challenge Tour Order of Merit, which earned him his PDC Tour Card. He won two titles each on the PDC's Challenge Tour and Development Tour before winning his first two PDC ranking titles during the 2021 Pro Tour and adding a third in 2023. He has reached the quarter-finals of two PDC World Championships: 2022 and 2025.

== Darts career ==
=== 2017–2019: Early PDC career ===
Rydz made his PDC European Tour debut at the 2017 Gibraltar Darts Trophy as a UK Qualifier, aged just 18. He was eliminated in the first round by Martin Schindler.

At 2018 PDC Q-School, Rydz tried to win a PDC Tour Card, however he missed out on the points table by virtue of countback. He played on the Challenge Tour and Development Tour throughout the year. As a result of his Development Tour exploits, he qualified for the 2018 PDC World Youth Championship and progressed through the early group stage. He managed to reach the semi-finals, including a victory over the #1 seed Luke Humphries but lost out 6–3 to eventual runner up Martin Schindler. He also tried to win a Tour Card in 2019 Q-School, but missed out again by one leg.

Rydz qualified for the 2019 UK Open by winning through the amateur qualifier in Wolverhampton, but lost to Jamie Hughes in the first round. On 21 April 2019, he won his first PDC title after picking up the Development Tour Event 8 title, beating Luke Humphries 5–2 in the final with a three-dart average of 106.6. At the 17th Players Championship event of 2019, Rydz made his first Pro Tour appearance in 2 years, and marked it with a run to the quarter-finals. He defeated Stephen Burton, Chris Dobey, Steve Beaton and Brendan Dolan before losing 6–3 to eventual winner James Wade. He followed up the Development Tour title with a Challenge Tour title on 11 August 2019 by seeing off David Evans 5–2 in the final. Rydz went to the top of the Challenge Tour Order of Merit on 28 September 2019 by winning Event 18, beating Cody Harris to win the title. Rydz finished 2019 top of the Challenge Tour Order of Merit, meaning he gained a two-year PDC Tour Card and qualified for the 2020 PDC World Darts Championship.

He made the quarter-finals of the 2019 PDC World Youth Championship on 4 November, but lost 6–2 to Adam Gawlas.

=== 2020 ===
At the 2020 World Championship, Rydz's debut at the tournament, he won his opening game 3–2 in sets against Steve Lennon but lost to Danny Noppert in the second round.

Rydz won Young Player of the Year at the 2020/21 PDC Awards Dinner.

=== 2021 ===
At the 2021 World Championship, Rydz lost in the second round to James Wade.

On the 2021 PDC Pro Tour Rydz competed in the 2021 PDC Players Championship series and won his first PDC ranking title on 26 February, at Players Championship 2, beating Jonny Clayton 8–7 in the final.

Rydz qualified for the 2021 World Matchplay, and on his debut he reached the quarter-finals, overcoming Glen Durrant 10–6, Rob Cross 11–8, before losing to Krzysztof Ratajski 16–8. He also made his World Grand Prix and European Championship debuts in 2021 but did not make it past the first round in either tournament.

In October, Rydz defeated Gabriel Clemens 8–6 in the final of Players Championship 25, earning his second PDC ranking title.

=== 2022 ===
Rydz entered the 2022 World Championship as the top qualifier from the Pro Tour Order of Merit. With whitewash wins against Yuki Yamada, Brendan Dolan and Nathan Aspinall, followed by a 4–1 win over Alan Soutar, Rydz reached the quarter-finals having only lost one set. He faced Peter Wright for a place in the semi-finals. Rydz had a 3–1 lead but bowed out of the tournament after Wright won the match 5–4 in a deciding set.

In the 2022 PDC Players Championship series he was the runner-up at Players Championship 15, losing to Michael Smith 8–3 in the final.

Rydz entered the 2022 Players Championship Finals as the 32nd seed. He defeated 33rd seed Madars Razma 6–5, 64th seed Ricardo Pietreczko 6–3, and 48th seed Keane Barry 10–8 to reach the quarter-finals where he lost to 24th seed Jonny Clayton 10–3.

=== 2023 ===
At the 2023 World Championship, Rydz lost in the second round to Josh Rock.

On the 2023 PDC Pro Tour Rydz competed in the 2023 PDC Players Championship series. He won his third ranking PDC title at Players Championship 19, defeating Dave Chisnall 8–7 in the final.

=== 2024 ===
At the 2024 World Championship, lost in the second round for the second successive year, this time to Ricardo Pietreczko.

In the 2024 PDC Players Championship series Rydz started off well, reaching the quarter-finals at event 2, losing there to Martin Lukeman 6–2, and defeating Luke Littler 6–4 to reach the semi-finals at event 3, where he lost to Gary Anderson 7–4. Rydz reached two more quarter-finals at events 9 and 22, losing 6–5 in deciding legs to Ritchie Edhouse and James Wade respectively. This qualified Rydz for the 2024 Players Championship Finals as the 42nd seed, but he lost to 23rd seed Dirk van Duijvenbode 6–1 in the first round.

On the European Tour, Rydz reached the semi-finals at the 2024 Swiss Darts Trophy.

=== 2025 ===
Rydz began the 2025 World Championship with a 3–0 win against Romeo Grbavac where he averaged 107, breaking the record for highest average in the first round of the PDC World Championship, which was set by Luke Littler at the 2024 edition. He then defeated 22nd seed Martin Schindler 3–0 before averaging 105 in a 4–0 win over 11th seed Dimitri van den Bergh. Rydz reached his second World Championship quarter-final after beating Robert Owen 4–3. He was beaten 5–3 by Michael van Gerwen, despite a higher average and winning more legs than van Gerwen.

== Personal life ==
Rydz is a supporter of football club Newcastle United F.C.

== World Championship results ==
=== PDC World Championship ===
- 2020: Second round (lost to Danny Noppert 2–3)
- 2021: Second round (lost to James Wade 0–3)
- 2022: Quarter-finals (lost to Peter Wright 4–5)
- 2023: Second round (lost to Josh Rock 0–3)
- 2024: Second round (lost to Ricardo Pietreczko 2–3)
- 2025: Quarter-finals (lost to Michael van Gerwen 3–5)
- 2026: Third round (lost to Josh Rock 1–4)

== Performance timeline ==
=== BDO ===
Tournament	2016	2018
World Masters	2R	1R

=== PDC ===
Tournament	2018	2019	2020	2021	2022	2023	2024	2025	2026
PDC Ranked televised events
World Championship	DNQ		2R	2R	QF	2R	2R	QF	3R
World Masters (Note: A non-ranked event until 2025)	Did not qualify					1R	DNQ	Prel.	Prel.
UK Open	DNP	1R	3R	5R	6R	5R	3R	3R	3R
World Matchplay	DNP	DNQ		QF	1R	Did not qualify			
World Grand Prix	DNP	DNQ		1R	1R	1R	Did not qualify		
European Championship	DNP		DNQ	1R	Did not qualify				
Players Championship Finals	DNP	DNQ	3R	2R	QF	1R	1R	2R	
PDC Non-ranked televised events
World Series Finals	Did not qualify								1R
World Youth Championship	SF	QF	3R	2R	SF	DNP			
Career statistics
Season-end ranking	148	93	68	30	23	34	40	39	

==== European Tour ====
Season	1	2	3	4	5	6	7	8	9	10	11	12	13	14	15
2017	Did not participate/qualify				GDT; 1R	Did not participate/qualify									
2020	BDC; 1R	Did not qualify													
2021	HDT; DNQ	GDT; 3R													
2022	IDO; DNQ	GDC; 2R	GDG; 2R	ADO; 3R	EDO; DNQ	CDO; DNQ	EDG; 1R	DDC; SF	EDM; 2R	HDT; 1R	Did not qualify				
2023	BSD; DNP	EDO; DNP	IDO; 1R	GDG; 2R	ADO; DNP	DDC; DNP	BDO; 1R	CDO; 1R	EDG; WD	EDM; 2R	DNP/DNQ				
2024	BDO; DNQ	GDG; DNQ	IDO; 2R	EDG; 1R	ADO; DNQ	BSD; DNQ	DDC; 1R	EDO; 2R	GDC; 1R	FDT; 1R	HDT; 1R	SDT; SF	CDO; 1R		
2025	BDO; DNQ	EDT; 1R	IDO; 1R	GDG; DNQ	ADO; DNQ	EDG; 1R	DDC; DNQ	EDO; DNQ	BSD; 1R	FDT; 1R	CDO; DNQ	HDT; DNQ	SDT; 2R	GDC; WD	
2026	PDO; 2R	Did not participate/qualify									CDO; 1R	FDT; 2R	FDT; DNQ	SDT; DNP	DDC; 1R

==== Players Championships ====
Season	1	2	3	4	5	6	7	8	9	10	11	12	13	14	15	16	17	18	19	20	21	22	23	24	25	26	27	28	29	30	31	32	33	34
2017 (Note: Not a Tour card holder)	Did not participate												WIG; 1R	WIG; 1R	BAR; 1R	BAR; 2R	BAR; 2R	BAR; 1R	DUB; 1R	DUB; 1R	BAR; 2R	BAR; 2R												
2018	Did not participate																																	
2019	Did not participate																	WIG; QF	BAR; 1R	BAR; DNP	HIL; 1R	HIL; 1R	BAR; 1R	BAR; 1R	BAR; 4R	BAR; 1R	DUB; 3R	DUB; 3R	BAR; 4R	BAR; 1R				
2020	BAR; 1R	BAR; 1R	WIG; 1R	WIG; 1R	WIG; 1R	WIG; 1R	BAR; 1R	BAR; DNP	MIL; 3R	MIL; 1R	MIL; 1R	MIL; 4R	MIL; 2R	NIE; 1R	NIE; 1R	NIE; 3R	NIE; 1R	NIE; 4R	COV; 1R	COV; 3R	COV; SF	COV; 1R	COV; 4R											
2021	BOL; 2R	BOL; W	BOL; 3R	BOL; 3R	MIL; 4R	MIL; 1R	MIL; 1R	MIL; 2R	NIE; DNP				MIL; 3R	MIL; 2R	MIL; 1R	MIL; SF	COV; 1R	COV; 2R	COV; 3R	COV; 1R	BAR; QF	BAR; 1R	BAR; 1R	BAR; 4R	BAR; W	BAR; 2R	BAR; 3R	BAR; 3R	BAR; DNP					
2022	BAR; 2R	BAR; 1R	WIG; 2R	WIG; 1R	BAR; 1R	BAR; 4R	NIE; 4R	NIE; 1R	BAR; 4R	BAR; 1R	BAR; QF	BAR; 1R	BAR; 3R	WIG; 1R	WIG; F	NIE; DNP		BAR; 1R	BAR; 2R	BAR; DNP					BAR; 1R	BAR; SF	BAR; 3R	BAR; 1R	BAR; 4R					
2023	BAR; QF	BAR; QF	BAR; 2R	BAR; 3R	BAR; 3R	BAR; 1R	HIL; 4R	HIL; 1R	WIG; 1R	WIG; 2R	LEI; 1R	LEI; DNP	HIL; 1R	HIL; 1R	LEI; 2R	LEI; 1R	HIL; DNP		BAR; W	BAR; SF	BAR; 2R	BAR; 3R	BAR; 1R	BAR; 1R	BAR; 4R	BAR; 1R	BAR; 1R	BAR; 3R	BAR; 3R	BAR; 1R				
2024	WIG; 1R	WIG; QF	LEI; SF	LEI; 2R	HIL; 3R	HIL; 3R	LEI; 1R	LEI; 1R	HIL; QF	HIL; 1R	HIL; 2R	HIL; 2R	MIL; 2R	MIL; 3R	MIL; 3R	MIL; 3R	MIL; 1R	MIL; DNP	MIL; 2R	WIG; 3R	WIG; 1R	MIL; QF	MIL; 1R	WIG; DNP			WIG; 3R	WIG; 1R	LEI; 2R	LEI; 1R				
2025	WIG; 3R	WIG; 3R	ROS; SF	ROS; 3R	LEI; 2R	LEI; 2R	HIL; DNP		LEI; 1R	LEI; 3R	LEI; 2R	LEI; 2R	ROS; 2R	ROS; 2R	HIL; 4R	HIL; 1R	LEI; 1R	LEI; 4R	LEI; 2R	LEI; 1R	LEI; 1R	HIL; 1R	HIL; 1R	MIL; 2R	MIL; 2R	HIL; 4R	HIL; 2R	LEI; 4R	LEI; 2R	LEI; 2R	WIG; 1R	WIG; 2R	WIG; 1R	WIG; 1R
2026	HIL; 4R	HIL; 1R	WIG; 3R	WIG; SF	LEI; 3R	LEI; 3R	LEI; 1R	LEI; 1R	WIG; 2R	WIG; 3R	MIL; 4R	MIL; 1R	HIL; 1R	HIL; 1R	LEI; 1R	LEI; 1R	LEI; 3R	LEI; 1R	MIL; 2R	MIL; 3R	WIG; 4R	WIG; 3R	LEI; 2R	LEI; 1R	HIL; 1R	HIL; 1R	LEI; 2R	LEI; 1R	ROS; 4R	ROS; 2R	ROS; 1R	ROS; 1R	LEI; 3R	LEI; 1R

Performance Table Legend
W	Won the tournament	F	Finalist	SF	Semifinalist	QF	Quarterfinalist	#R; RR; Prel.	Lost in # round Round-robin; Preliminary round	DQ	Disqualified
DNQ	Did not qualify	DNP	Did not participate	WD	Withdrew	NH	Tournament not held	#R; RR; Prel.	Lost in # round Round-robin; Preliminary round	NYF	Not yet founded
