= 2022 World Grand Prix (darts) =

2022 BoyleSports World Grand Prix

Tournament information
- Dates: 3–9 October 2022
- Venue: Leicester Arena
- Location: Leicester, England
- Organisation(s): Professional Darts Corporation (PDC)
- Format: Sets "Double in, Double out"
- Prize fund: £600,000
- Winner's share: £120,000
- High checkout: 167 Michael van Gerwen

Champion(s)
- Michael van Gerwen (NED)

The 2022 BoyleSports World Grand Prix was a darts tournament and the 25th staging of the World Grand Prix. It was held from 3 to 9 October 2022 at the Leicester Arena in Leicester, England. Due to the COVID-19 pandemic, the tournament was held away from the Citywest Hotel in Dublin for the third consecutive year.

Jonny Clayton was the defending champion after defeating Gerwyn Price 5–1 in the 2021 final, but he lost to Dimitri Van den Bergh 3–2 in the second round.

Michael van Gerwen won his sixth World Grand Prix title, defeating Nathan Aspinall 5–3 in the final.

== Format ==
All matches were played as double in, double out; requiring the players to score 501 points to win a leg, beginning with as well as finishing on either a double or the bullseye. Matches were played to set format, with each set being the best of five legs (first to three).

This is the only "double in" tournament on the PDC circuit, and along with the World Championship the only tournament which uses the set format.

The matches got longer as the tournament progressed:

Round	Best of (sets)	First to (sets)
First	3	2
Second	5	3
Quarter-finals	5	3
Semi-finals	7	4
Final	9	5

== Prize money ==
The prize fund was due to increase from £450,000 to £550,000, but on 1 July 2022, it was announced that it was going to increase to £600,000, with the winner earning themselves £120,000.

The following is the breakdown of the fund:

Position (no. of players)		Prize money (Total: £600,000)
Winner	(1)	£120,000
Runner-up	(1)	£60,000
Semi-finalists	(2)	£40,000
Quarter-finalists	(4)	£25,000
Second round losers	(8)	£15,000
First round losers	(16)	£7,500

== Qualification ==
The field of 32 players consisted of the top 16 on the PDC Order of Merit and the top 16 non-qualified players from the ProTour Order of Merit as of 26 September 2022. The top eight players on the Order of Merit were seeded for the tournament.

31 of the 32 players also qualified for the 2022 World Matchplay held two months earlier, with the only change being Ross Smith in place of Rowby-John Rodriguez.

The following players qualified:

=== PDC Order of Merit ===
1. Gerwyn Price (semi-finals)
2. Peter Wright (semi-finals)
3. Michael van Gerwen (champion)
4. Michael Smith (first round)
5. James Wade (first round)
6. José de Sousa (first round)
7. Jonny Clayton (second round)
8. Rob Cross (first round)
9. Gary Anderson (first round)
10. Danny Noppert (second round)
11. Luke Humphries (first round)
12. Joe Cullen (second round)
13. Dirk van Duijvenbode (first round)
14. Dave Chisnall (first round)
15. Dimitri Van den Bergh (quarter-finals)
16. Nathan Aspinall (runner-up)

=== PDC ProTour qualifiers ===
1. Damon Heta (first round)
2. Ryan Searle (first round)
3. Martin Schindler (first round)
4. Krzysztof Ratajski (second round)
5. Andrew Gilding (first round)
6. Chris Dobey (quarter-finals)
7. Gabriel Clemens (first round)
8. Daryl Gurney (second round)
9. Adrian Lewis (second round)
10. Madars Razma (quarter-finals)
11. Stephen Bunting (second round)
12. Kim Huybrechts (first round)
13. Martin Lukeman (quarter-finals)
14. Callan Rydz (first round)
15. Brendan Dolan (first round)
16. Ross Smith (second round)

== Schedule ==
Monday, 3 October

Match #	Round	Player 1	Score	Player 2	Set 1	Set 2	Set 3
01	1	Callan Rydz 85.84	0–2	Krzysztof Ratajski 90.21	2–3	1–3	—N/a
02	1	Brendan Dolan 81.88	0–2	Stephen Bunting 86.85	2–3	1–3	—N/a
03	1	Chris Dobey 90.85	2–0	Luke Humphries 78.31	3–2	3–0	—N/a
04	1	Dimitri Van den Bergh 86.20	2–1	Dave Chisnall 87.15	3–1	2–3	3–2
05	1	Jonny Clayton 82.24	2–1	Dirk van Duijvenbode 83.69	1–3	3–1	3–1
06	1	Peter Wright 94.36	2–0	Kim Huybrechts 93.74	3–2	3–1	—N/a
07	1	Michael van Gerwen 89.43	2–0	Gary Anderson 83.59	3–0	3–2	—N/a
08	1	José de Sousa 87.99	0–2	Adrian Lewis 94.70	2–3	2–3	—N/a

Tuesday, 4 October

Match #	Round	Player 1	Score	Player 2	Set 1	Set 2	Set 3
09	1	Madars Razma 77.54	2–1	Ryan Searle 80.79	3–1	2–3	3–0
10	1	Ross Smith 86.09	2–1	Andrew Gilding 79.07	0–3	3–2	3–1
11	1	Danny Noppert 85.69	2–0	Gabriel Clemens 82.38	3–0	3–2	—N/a
12	1	Joe Cullen 91.61	2–1	Damon Heta 91.61	3–2	0–3	3–1
13	1	Rob Cross 86.54	1–2	Daryl Gurney 85.71	2–3	3–1	0–3
14	1	James Wade 79.54	1–2	Martin Lukeman 82.08	0–3	3–1	2–3
15	1	Gerwyn Price 86.90	2–0	Martin Schindler 82.96	3–1	3–0	—N/a
16	1	Michael Smith 80.73	1–2	Nathan Aspinall 80.68	1–3	3–2	0–3

Wednesday, 5 October

Match #	Round	Player 1	Score	Player 2	Set 1	Set 2	Set 3	Set 4	Set 5
17	2	Adrian Lewis 86.44	2–3	Chris Dobey 82.83	3–0	1–3	2–3	3–2	2–3
18	2	Peter Wright 90.93	3–2	Krzysztof Ratajski 83.14	3–2	2–3	2–3	3–0	3–0
19	2	Michael van Gerwen 94.35	3–2	Stephen Bunting 84.56	2–3	3–0	3–0	2–3	3–1
20	2	Jonny Clayton 84.01	2–3	Dimitri Van den Bergh 89.25	3–1	1–3	1–3	3–2	1–3

Thursday, 6 October

Match #	Round	Player 1	Score	Player 2	Set 1	Set 2	Set 3	Set 4	Set 5
21	2	Martin Lukeman 81.63	3–2	Ross Smith 84.18	2–3	3–2	3–0	2–3	3–2
22	2	Daryl Gurney 84.20	1–3	Madars Razma 92.40	1–3	0–3	3–1	2–3	—N/a
23	2	Gerwyn Price 92.95	3–2	Joe Cullen 88.08	3–1	0–3	1–3	3–0	3–0
24	2	Nathan Aspinall 85.18	3–2	Danny Noppert 79.38	2–3	2–3	3–1	3–1	3–2

Friday, 7 October

Match #	Round	Player 1	Score	Player 2	Set 1	Set 2	Set 3	Set 4	Set 5
25	QF	Nathan Aspinall 90.03	3–2	Martin Lukeman 80.08	3–1	2–3	3–0	2–3	3–1
26	QF	Gerwyn Price 91.28	3–0	Madars Razma 74.45	3–1	3–0	3–1	—N/a	—N/a
27	QF	Peter Wright 84.59	3–2	Dimitri Van den Bergh 88.55	3–0	2–3	2–3	3–1	3–2
28	QF	Michael van Gerwen 99.33	3–1	Chris Dobey 88.62	3–2	2–3	3–1	3–1	—N/a

Saturday, 8 October

Match #	Round	Player 1	Score	Player 2	Set 1	Set 2	Set 3	Set 4	Set 5	Set 6	Set 7
29	SF	Gerwyn Price 84.57	2–4	Nathan Aspinall 87.13	1–3	3–1	1–3	2–3	3–2	2–3	—N/a
30	SF	Peter Wright 82.03	0–4	Michael van Gerwen 91.64	0–3	0–3	1–3	0–3	—N/a	—N/a	—N/a

Sunday, 9 October

Match #	Round	Player 1	Score	Player 2	Set 1	Set 2	Set 3	Set 4	Set 5	Set 6	Set 7	Set 8	Set 9
31	F	Nathan Aspinall 91.88	3–5	Michael van Gerwen 91.07	0–3	2–3	2–3	1–3	3–1	3–1	3–1	2–3	—N/a

== Draw ==
The draw was made on 26 September by Barry Hearn.

First round (best of 3 sets); 3–4 October
1	Gerwyn Price 86.90	2
Martin Schindler 82.96	0
Joe Cullen 91.61	2
Damon Heta 91.61	1
8	Rob Cross 86.54	1
Daryl Gurney 85.71	2
Madars Razma 77.54	2
Ryan Searle 80.79	1
4	Michael Smith 80.73	1
Nathan Aspinall 80.68	2
Danny Noppert 85.69	2
Gabriel Clemens 82.38	0
5	James Wade 79.54	1
Martin Lukeman 82.08	2
Ross Smith 86.09	2
Andrew Gilding 79.07	1
2	Peter Wright 94.36	2
Kim Huybrechts 93.74	0
Callan Rydz 85.84	0
Krzysztof Ratajski 90.21	2
7	Jonny Clayton 82.24	2
Dirk van Duijvenbode 83.69	1
Dimitri Van den Bergh 86.20	2
Dave Chisnall 87.15	1
3	Michael van Gerwen 89.43	2
Gary Anderson 83.59	0
Brendan Dolan 81.88	0
Stephen Bunting 86.85	2
6	José de Sousa 87.99	0
Adrian Lewis 94.70	2
Chris Dobey 90.85	2
Luke Humphries 78.31	0

Second round (best of 5 sets); 5–6 October
1	Gerwyn Price 92.95	3
Joe Cullen 88.08	2
Daryl Gurney 84.20	1
Madars Razma 92.40	3
Nathan Aspinall 85.18	3
Danny Noppert 79.38	2
Martin Lukeman 81.63	3
Ross Smith 84.18	2
2	Peter Wright 90.93	3
Krzysztof Ratajski 83.14	2
7	Jonny Clayton 84.01	2
Dimitri Van den Bergh 89.25	3
3	Michael van Gerwen 94.35	3
Stephen Bunting 84.56	2
Adrian Lewis 86.44	2
Chris Dobey 82.83	3

Quarter-finals (best of 5 sets); 7 October
1	Gerwyn Price 91.28	3
Madars Razma 74.45	0
Nathan Aspinall 90.03	3
Martin Lukeman 80.08	2
2	Peter Wright 84.59	3
Dimitri Van den Bergh 88.55	2
3	Michael van Gerwen 99.33	3
Chris Dobey 88.62	1

Semi-finals (best of 7 sets); 8 October
1	Gerwyn Price 84.57	2
Nathan Aspinall 87.13	4
2	Peter Wright 82.03	0
3	Michael van Gerwen 91.64	4

Final (best of 9 sets); 9 October
Nathan Aspinall 91.88	3
3	Michael van Gerwen 91.07	5
