= 2023 World Grand Prix (darts) =

2023 BoyleSports World Grand Prix

Tournament information
- Dates: 2–8 October 2023
- Venue: Leicester Arena
- Location: Leicester, England
- Organisation(s): Professional Darts Corporation (PDC)
- Format: Sets "Double in, Double out"
- Prize fund: £600,000
- Winner's share: £120,000
- High checkout: 170 Luke Humphries (final)

Champion(s)
- Luke Humphries (ENG)

The 2023 BoyleSports World Grand Prix was a darts tournament and the 26th staging of the World Grand Prix. It was held from 2 to 8 October 2023 at the Leicester Arena in Leicester, England.

Michael van Gerwen was the defending champion after defeating Nathan Aspinall 5–3 in the 2022 final, but he lost 3–2 in the second round to Chris Dobey.

Luke Humphries won his first major TV title, defeating Gerwyn Price 5–2 in the final.

== Format ==
All matches were played as double in, double out; requiring the players to score 501 points to win a leg, beginning with as well as finishing on either a double or the bullseye. Matches were played to set format, with each set being the best of five legs (first to three).

This is the only "double in" tournament on the PDC circuit, and along with the World Championship the only tournament which uses the set format.

The matches got longer as the tournament progressed:

Round	Best of (sets)	First to (sets)
First	3	2
Second	5	3
Quarter-finals	5	3
Semi-finals	7	4
Final	9	5

== Prize money ==
The following is the breakdown of the fund:

Position (no. of players)		Prize money (Total: £600,000)
Winner	(1)	£120,000
Runner-up	(1)	£60,000
Semi-finalists	(2)	£40,000
Quarter-finalists	(4)	£25,000
Second round losers	(8)	£15,000
First round losers	(16)	£7,500

== Qualification ==
The field of 32 players consisted of the top 16 on the PDC Order of Merit and the top 16 non-qualified players from the ProTour Order of Merit as of 25 September 2023. The top eight players on the Order of Merit were seeded for the tournament.

The following players qualified for the tournament:

=== PDC Order of Merit ===
1. Michael Smith (semi-finals)
2. Michael van Gerwen (second round)
3. Peter Wright (quarter-finals)
4. Gerwyn Price (runner-up)
5. Nathan Aspinall (first round)
6. Luke Humphries (champion)
7. Jonny Clayton (first round)
8. Rob Cross (first round)
9. Danny Noppert (first round)
10. Dirk van Duijvenbode (first round)
11. Joe Cullen (semi-finals)
12. Dave Chisnall (first round)
13. Damon Heta (first round)
14. Dimitri Van den Bergh (first round)
15. Ryan Searle (second round)
16. James Wade (first round)

=== PDC ProTour qualifiers ===
1. Josh Rock (first round)
2. Krzysztof Ratajski (second round)
3. Martin Schindler (quarter-finals)
4. Stephen Bunting (second round)
5. Ross Smith (second round)
6. Andrew Gilding (quarter-finals)
7. José de Sousa (first round)
8. Gary Anderson (second round)
9. Mike De Decker (first round)
10. Daryl Gurney (first round)
11. Gabriel Clemens (first round)
12. Brendan Dolan (second round)
13. Raymond van Barneveld (first round)
14. Chris Dobey (quarter-finals)
15. Callan Rydz (first round)
16. Luke Woodhouse (second round)

== Schedule ==
Monday, 2 October

Match #	Round	Player 1	Score	Player 2	Set 1	Set 2	Set 3
01	1	Dirk van Duijvenbode 84.93	1–2	Brendan Dolan 84.60	3–0	1–3	0–3
02	1	José de Sousa 95.17	1–2	Gary Anderson 95.41	3–2	0–3	2–3
03	1	Krzysztof Ratajski 80.78	2–1	James Wade 83.70	1–3	3–0	3–2
04	1	Martin Schindler 83.22	2–1	Raymond van Barneveld 76.69	3–2	2–3	3–1
05	1	Nathan Aspinall 81.01	1–2	Stephen Bunting 84.35	1–3	3–2	2–3
06	1	Gerwyn Price 88.23	2–0	Danny Noppert 89.21	3–2	3–0	—N/a
07	1	Michael Smith 96.14	2–0	Callan Rydz 82.74	3–0	3–1	—N/a
08	1	Rob Cross 74.25	1–2	Andrew Gilding 74.93	3–0	1–3	2–3

Tuesday, 3 October

Match #	Round	Player 1	Score	Player 2	Set 1	Set 2	Set 3
09	1	Joe Cullen 92.07	2–0	Mike De Decker 80.81	3–2	3–1	—N/a
10	1	Dave Chisnall 94.62	0–2	Luke Woodhouse 95.96	1–3	2–3	—N/a
11	1	Damon Heta 86.46	1–2	Ryan Searle 86.94	3–2	0–3	2–3
12	1	Dimitri Van den Bergh 84.78	0–2	Chris Dobey 91.13	2–3	2–3	—N/a
13	1	Peter Wright 89.49	2–0	Gabriel Clemens 84.47	3–1	3–1	—N/a
14	1	Michael van Gerwen 95.74	2–0	Josh Rock 73.44	3–1	3–0	—N/a
15	1	Jonny Clayton 81.85	0–2	Ross Smith 87.68	1–3	2–3	—N/a
16	1	Luke Humphries 86.64	2–0	Daryl Gurney 85.22	3–1	3–2	—N/a

Wednesday, 4 October

Match #	Round	Player 1	Score	Player 2	Set 1	Set 2	Set 3	Set 4	Set 5
17	2	Andrew Gilding 80.20	3–2	Gary Anderson 83.09	0–3	3–2	0–3	3–0	3–1
18	2	Stephen Bunting 91.64	2–3	Martin Schindler 87.06	3–0	1–3	1–3	3–2	1–3
19	2	Gerwyn Price 85.13	3–0	Krzysztof Ratajski 80.78	3–2	3–2	3–2	—N/a	—N/a
20	2	Michael Smith 90.57	3–0	Brendan Dolan 76.83	3–1	3–1	3–0	—N/a	—N/a

Thursday, 5 October

Match #	Round	Player 1	Score	Player 2	Set 1	Set 2	Set 3	Set 4	Set 5
21	2	Luke Humphries 84.85	3–0	Luke Woodhouse 82.84	3–2	3–2	3–2	—N/a	—N/a
22	2	Peter Wright 87.30	3–1	Ryan Searle 87.13	1–3	3–1	3–2	3–0	—N/a
23	2	Michael van Gerwen 87.02	2–3	Chris Dobey 91.87	1–3	3–0	3–2	2–3	0–3
24	2	Ross Smith 88.21	1–3	Joe Cullen 94.64	0–3	3–2	2–3	2–3	—N/a

Friday, 6 October

Match #	Round	Player 1	Score	Player 2	Set 1	Set 2	Set 3	Set 4	Set 5
25	QF	Gerwyn Price 90.73	3–0	Martin Schindler 79.77	3–0	3–0	3–1	—N/a	—N/a
26	QF	Michael Smith 87.69	3–0	Andrew Gilding 83.98	3–1	3–0	3–2	—N/a	—N/a
27	QF	Peter Wright 90.92	2–3	Luke Humphries 92.32	3–1	3–2	1–3	2–3	2–3
28	QF	Chris Dobey 82.98	2–3	Joe Cullen 86.81	0–3	3–1	3–1	1–3	1–3

Saturday, 7 October

Match #	Round	Player 1	Score	Player 2	Set 1	Set 2	Set 3	Set 4	Set 5	Set 6	Set 7
29	SF	Michael Smith 83.94	2–4	Gerwyn Price 85.08	2–3	3–2	3–0	0–3	1–3	0–3	—N/a
30	SF	Joe Cullen 80.06	0–4	Luke Humphries 85.96	1–3	1–3	1–3	2–3	—N/a	—N/a	—N/a

Sunday, 8 October

Match #	Round	Player 1	Score	Player 2	Set 1	Set 2	Set 3	Set 4	Set 5	Set 6	Set 7	Set 8	Set 9
31	F	Gerwyn Price 91.00	2–5	Luke Humphries 93.30	3–0	1–3	1–3	0–3	3–2	2–3	2–3	—N/a	—N/a

== Final ==
Best of 9 sets Referee: Huw Ware; Morningside Arena, Leicester, England, 8 October 2023
Gerwyn Price (4)	2–5	Luke Humphries (6)
3–0, 1–3, 1–3, 0–3, 3–2, 2–3, 2–3
91.00	Average (3 darts)	93.30
49	100+ scores	45
13	140+ scores	17
3	180 scores	8
117	Highest checkout	170
1	Checkouts 100+	3
12/23 (52.2%)	Checkout summary	17/42 (40.5%)
29/58 (50%)	Double in summary	29/57 (50.8%)

== Draw ==
The draw was made on 25 September.

First round (best of 3 sets); 2–3 October
1	Michael Smith 96.14	2
Callan Rydz 82.74	0
Dirk van Duijvenbode 84.93	1
Brendan Dolan 84.60	2
8	Rob Cross 74.25	1
Andrew Gilding 74.93	2
José de Sousa 95.17	1
Gary Anderson 95.41	2
4	Gerwyn Price 88.23	2
Danny Noppert 89.21	0
Krzysztof Ratajski 80.78	2
James Wade 83.70	1
5	Nathan Aspinall 81.01	1
Stephen Bunting 84.35	2
Martin Schindler 83.22	2
Raymond van Barneveld 76.69	1
2	Michael van Gerwen 95.74	2
Josh Rock 73.44	0
Dimitri Van den Bergh 84.78	0
Chris Dobey 91.13	2
7	Jonny Clayton 81.85	0
Ross Smith 87.68	2
Joe Cullen 92.07	2
Mike De Decker 80.81	0
3	Peter Wright 89.49	2
Gabriel Clemens 84.47	0
Damon Heta 86.46	1
Ryan Searle 86.94	2
6	Luke Humphries 86.64	2
Daryl Gurney 85.22	0
Dave Chisnall 94.62	0
Luke Woodhouse 95.96	2

Second round (best of 5 sets); 4–5 October
1	Michael Smith 90.57	3
Brendan Dolan 76.83	0
Andrew Gilding 80.20	3
Gary Anderson 83.09	2
4	Gerwyn Price 85.13	3
Krzysztof Ratajski 80.78	0
Stephen Bunting 92.06	2
Martin Schindler 88.21	3
2	Michael van Gerwen 87.02	2
Chris Dobey 91.87	3
Ross Smith 88.21	1
Joe Cullen 94.64	3
3	Peter Wright 87.30	3
Ryan Searle 87.13	1
6	Luke Humphries 84.85	3
Luke Woodhouse 82.84	0

Quarter-finals (best of 5 sets); 6 October
1	Michael Smith 87.69	3
Andrew Gilding 83.98	0
4	Gerwyn Price 90.73	3
Martin Schindler 79.77	0
Chris Dobey 82.98	2
Joe Cullen 86.81	3
3	Peter Wright 90.92	2
6	Luke Humphries 92.32	3

Semi-finals (best of 7 sets); 7 October
1	Michael Smith 83.94	2
4	Gerwyn Price 85.08	4
Joe Cullen 80.06	0
6	Luke Humphries 85.96	4

Final (best of 9 sets); 8 October
4	Gerwyn Price 91.00	2
6	Luke Humphries 93.30	5
