= 2024 Hungarian Darts Trophy =

Tournament information
- Dates: 20–22 September 2024
- Venue: MVM Dome
- Location: Budapest, Hungary
- Organisation(s): Professional Darts Corporation (PDC)
- Format: Legs
- Prize fund: £175,000
- Winner's share: £30,000
- Nine-dart finish: Cor Dekker; Michael van Gerwen; Martin Schindler
- High checkout: 170 Michael van Gerwen

Champion(s)
- Michael van Gerwen

The 2024 Hungarian Darts Trophy was the eleventh of thirteen PDC European Tour events on the 2024 PDC Pro Tour. The tournament took place at the MVM Dome, Budapest, Hungary from 20 to 22 September 2024. It featured a field of 48 players and £175,000 in prize money, with £30,000 going to the winner.

Two nine-darters were hit on the same day for the first time in European Tour history, by Cor Dekker and Michael van Gerwen.

The event then became the first on the European Tour to feature three nine-darters, Martin Schindler hitting one in his third-round defeat.

Dave Chisnall was the defending champion after defeating Luke Humphries 8–7 in the 2023 final. Chisnall lost to Daryl Gurney 6–5 in the third round.

Van Gerwen won the title, defeating Gian van Veen 8–7 in the final. van Veen missed a match dart at the bullseye to win the title while leading 7–6.

== Prize money ==
The prize fund remained at £175,000, with £30,000 to the winner:

Stage (num. of players)		Prize money
Winner	(1)	£30,000
Runner-up	(1)	£12,000
Semi-finalists	(2)	£8,500
Quarter-finalists	(4)	£6,000
Third round losers	(8)	£4,000
Second round losers	(16)	£2,500*
First round losers	(16)	£1,250*
Total	£175,000	

- Pre-qualified players from the Orders of Merit who lose in their first match of the event shall not be credited with prize money on any Order of Merit. A player who qualifies as a qualifier, but later becomes a seed due to the withdrawal of one or more other players shall be credited with their prize money on all Orders of Merit regardless of how far they progress in the event.

== Qualification and format ==
A massive overhaul in the qualification for the 2024 European Tour events was announced on 7 January.

For the first time, both the PDC Order of Merit and the PDC Pro Tour Order of Merit rankings were used to determine 32 of the 48 entrants for the event.

The top 16 on the PDC Order of Merit qualified, along with the highest 16 ranked players on the PDC ProTour Order of Merit (after the PDC Order of Merit players were removed). From those 32 players, the 16 highest ranked players on the PDC ProTour Order of Merit were seeded for the event.

The seedings were confirmed on 26 July.

The remaining 16 places went to players from four qualifying events – 10 from the Tour Card Holder Qualifier (held on 3 August), four from the Host Nation Qualifier (held on 1 June), one from the Nordic & Baltic Associate Member Qualifier (held on 26 July), and one from the East European Associate Member Qualifier (held on 1 June).

Luke Littler and Ryan Joyce withdrew, while Leighton Bennett was ineligible due to a suspension. They were replaced by Alan Soutar, Niels Zonneveld and Jim Williams. Daryl Gurney moved up to become a seed.

The following players are taking part in the tournament:

Seeded Players

1. Dave Chisnall (third round)
2. Ross Smith (semi-finals)
3. Luke Humphries (second round)
4. Gerwyn Price (second round)
5. Danny Noppert (third round)
6. Josh Rock (quarter-finals)
7. Stephen Bunting (quarter-finals)
8. Damon Heta (second round)
9. Ryan Searle (semi-finals)
10. Martin Schindler (third round)
11. Rob Cross (third round)
12. Gian van Veen (runner-up)
13. Chris Dobey (second round)
14. Michael van Gerwen (champion)
15. Ricardo Pietreczko (third round)
16. Daryl Gurney (quarter-finals)

Order of Merit Qualifiers
- Jonny Clayton (second round)
- Michael Smith (first round)
- Raymond van Barneveld (second round)
- Peter Wright (third round)
- Krzysztof Ratajski (first round)
- Ritchie Edhouse (first round)
- Brendan Dolan (first round)
- Luke Woodhouse (first round)
- James Wade (second round)
- Andrew Gilding (second round)
- Joe Cullen (first round)
- Callan Rydz (first round)
- Dimitri Van den Bergh (first round)
- Nathan Aspinall (second round)

Tour Card Qualifier
- Martin Lukeman (second round)
- Darren Beveridge (first round)
- Dirk van Duijvenbode (first round)
- Gabriel Clemens (third round)
- Wessel Nijman (quarter-finals)
- Lukas Wenig (first round)
- Scott Williams (third round)
- Keane Barry (second round)
- Florian Hempel (second round)

Host Nation Qualifier
- András Csóka (first round)
- György Jehirszki (first round)
- Alberto Mario Bezjian (second round)
- János Végső (first round)

Nordic and Baltic Qualifier
- Cor Dekker (second round)

East European Qualifier
- Sebastian Białecki (first round)

Reserve List
- Alan Soutar (first round)
- Niels Zonneveld (second round)
- Jim Williams (second round)

== Draw ==
First round (best of 11 legs); 20 September
Michael Smith 92.17	3
Jonny Clayton 94.17	6
Florian Hempel 91.72	6
Callan Rydz 88.60	5
Peter Wright 96.24	6
Joe Cullen 85.27	5
Alberto Mario Bezjian 67.66	6
András Csóka 64.47	4
György Jehirszki 68.13	0
Wessel Nijman 91.09	6
Luke Woodhouse 94.59	5
Scott Williams 91.02	6
Krzysztof Ratajski 92.24	3
Nathan Aspinall 93.72	6
Darren Beveridge 89.51	2
Keane Barry 91.22	6
Raymond van Barneveld 93.92	6
Ritchie Edhouse 87.61	3
Sebastian Białecki 93.69	5
Alt	Niels Zonneveld 94.70	6
János Végső 71.97	4
Cor Dekker 77.79	6
Alt	Jim Williams 97.88	6
Alt	Alan Soutar 91.59	1
Dirk van Duijvenbode 89.65	1
Gabriel Clemens 96.00	6
Brendan Dolan 88.44	4
Martin Lukeman 86.21	6
James Wade 94.22	6
Lukas Wenig 83.15	4
Dimitri Van den Bergh 84.74	3
Andrew Gilding 83.31	6

Second round (best of 11 legs); 21 September
1	Dave Chisnall 100.94	6
Jonny Clayton 94.25	1
16	Daryl Gurney 91.11	6
Florian Hempel 81.81	5
8	Damon Heta 88.58	0
Peter Wright 92.97	6
9	Ryan Searle 90.59	6
Alberto Mario Bezjian 72.51	1
4	Gerwyn Price 97.62	5
Wessel Nijman 97.86	6
13	Chris Dobey 90.95	4
Scott Williams 94.21	6
5	Danny Noppert 98.74	6
Nathan Aspinall 93.70	4
12	Gian van Veen 100.29	6
Keane Barry 88.48	4
2	Ross Smith 99.94	6
Raymond van Barneveld 95.00	2
15	Ricardo Pietreczko 95.74	6
Alt	Niels Zonneveld 97.57	5
7	Stephen Bunting 95.87	6
Cor Dekker 95.21	2
10	Martin Schindler 96.37	6
Alt	Jim Williams 92.40	5
3	Luke Humphries 101.86	5
Gabriel Clemens 99.25	6
14	Michael van Gerwen 104.52	6
Martin Lukeman 83.37	2
6	Josh Rock 93.64	6
James Wade 92.98	5
11	Rob Cross 94.77	6
Andrew Gilding 82.50	1

Third round (best of 11 legs); 22 September
1	Chisnall 101.84	5
16	Gurney 98.21	6
Wright 95.43	1
9	Searle 100.98	6
Nijman 104.23	6
Williams 98.65	1
5	Noppert 102.68	3
12	Veen 101.31	6
2	R. Smith 107.36	1
15	Pietreczko 55.75	0
7	Bunting 89.17	6
10	Schindler 93.81	4
Clemens 90.23	2
14	van Gerwen 100.46	6
6	Rock 99.91	6
11	Cross 91.19	4

Quarter-finals (best of 11 legs); 22 September
16	Gurney 92.42	3
9	Searle 97.86	6
Nijman 97.17	2
12	Veen 103.62	6
2	R. Smith 95.39	6
7	Bunting 100.01	5
14	van Gerwen 95.38	6
6	Rock 95.46	4

Semi-finals (best of 13 legs); 22 September
9	Searle 93.39	5
12	Veen 97.47	7
2	R. Smith 94.76	3
14	van Gerwen 107.87	7

Final (best of 15 legs); 22 September
12	van Veen 94.81	7
14	van Gerwen 97.90	8

== Notes ==
1. Pietreczko withdrew at the end of the first leg because of a wrist injury.
