= 2024 Flanders Darts Trophy =

Tournament information
- Dates: 6–8 September 2024
- Venue: Antwerp XPO
- Location: Antwerp, Belgium
- Organisation(s): Professional Darts Corporation (PDC)
- Format: Legs
- Prize fund: £175,000
- Winner's share: £30,000
- High checkout: 170 Mike De Decker

Champion(s)
- Dave Chisnall

The 2024 Flanders Darts Trophy was the tenth of thirteen PDC European Tour events on the 2024 PDC Pro Tour. The tournament took place at the Antwerp XPO, Antwerp, Belgium from 6 to 8 September 2024. It featured a field of 48 players and £175,000 in prize money, with £30,000 going to the winner.

This was the first edition of the event, marking the first European Tour event in Antwerp. With the Belgian Darts Open taking place in Wieze earlier in 2024, this was the first time multiple European Tour events have taken place in Belgium in the same year.

Dave Chisnall won the title in his 100th European Tour event, beating Ricardo Pietreczko 8–6 in the final.

== Prize money ==
The prize fund remained at £175,000, with £30,000 to the winner:

Stage (num. of players)		Prize money
Winner	(1)	£30,000
Runner-up	(1)	£12,000
Semi-finalists	(2)	£8,500
Quarter-finalists	(4)	£6,000
Third round losers	(8)	£4,000
Second round losers	(16)	£2,500*
First round losers	(16)	£1,250*
Total	£175,000	

- Pre-qualified players from the Orders of Merit who lose in their first match of the event shall not be credited with prize money on any Order of Merit. A player who qualifies as a qualifier, but later becomes a seed due to the withdrawal of one or more other players shall be credited with their prize money on all Orders of Merit regardless of how far they progress in the event.

== Qualification and format ==
A massive overhaul in the qualification for the 2024 European Tour events was announced on 7 January.

For the first time, both the PDC Order of Merit and the PDC Pro Tour Order of Merit rankings were used to determine 32 of the 48 entrants for the event.

The top 16 on the PDC Order of Merit qualified, along with the highest 16 ranked players on the PDC ProTour Order of Merit (after the PDC Order of Merit players were removed). From those 32 players, the 16 highest ranked players on the PDC ProTour Order of Merit were seeded for the event.

The seedings were confirmed on 7 June.

The remaining 16 places went to players from four qualifying events – 10 from the Tour Card Holder Qualifier (held on 13 June), four from the Host Nation Qualifier (to be held on 5 September), one from the Nordic & Baltic Associate Member Qualifier (held on 1 June), and one from the East European Associate Member Qualifier (held on 1 June).

Gary Anderson and Nathan Aspinall withdrew and were replaced by Mike De Decker and Scott Williams. Ryan Joyce moved up to become a seed.

The following players took part in the tournament:

Seeded Players

1. Luke Humphries (semi-finals)
2. Dave Chisnall (champion)
3. Gerwyn Price (second round)
4. Damon Heta (second round)
5. Danny Noppert (third round)
6. Josh Rock (third round)
7. Stephen Bunting (third round)
8. Ryan Searle (quarter-finals)
9. Ross Smith (third round)
10. Martin Schindler (second round)
11. Chris Dobey (semi-finals)
12. Ricardo Pietreczko (runner-up)
13. Luke Littler (third round)
14. Gian van Veen (third round)
15. Michael van Gerwen (second round)
16. Ryan Joyce (third round)

Order of Merit Qualifiers
- Daryl Gurney (first round)
- Joe Cullen (second round)
- Brendan Dolan (first round)
- Luke Woodhouse (quarter-finals)
- Jonny Clayton (first round)
- Raymond van Barneveld (second round)
- Krzysztof Ratajski (first round)
- James Wade (second round)
- Ritchie Edhouse (second round)
- Andrew Gilding (second round)
- Peter Wright (quarter-finals)
- Dimitri Van den Bergh (first round)
- Dirk van Duijvenbode (quarter-finals)
- Callan Rydz (first round)

Tour Card Qualifier
- Martin Lukeman (first round)
- Jitse van der Wal (second round)
- Kevin Doets (second round)
- Richard Veenstra (first round)
- Jermaine Wattimena (second round)
- Robert Owen (second round)
- Maik Kuivenhoven (first round)
- Alan Soutar (second round)
- Cameron Menzies (first round)
- Gabriel Clemens (third round)

Host Nation Qualifier
- Jody Tobback (first round)
- Brian Raman (first round)
- Luc Bogaert (first round)
- François Schweyen (first round)

Nordic and Baltic Qualifier
- Marko Kantele (first round)

East European Qualifier
- Sebastian Białecki (first round)

Reserve List
- Mike De Decker (second round)
- Scott Williams (second round)

== Draw ==
First round (best of 11 legs); 6 September
Daryl Gurney 98.09	3
Ritchie Edhouse 104.63	6
Jody Tobback 72.56	0
Alan Soutar 87.55	6
Joe Cullen 93.32	6
Callan Rydz 86.87	3
Alt	Mike De Decker 89.60	6
Richard Veenstra 85.10	2
Jonny Clayton 93.50	2
Dirk van Duijvenbode 103.67	6
Jermaine Wattimena 102.16	6
Brian Raman 93.88	4
Raymond van Barneveld 98.02	6
Maik Kuivenhoven 84.66	0
Andrew Gilding 101.41	6
Dimitri Van den Bergh 94.43	2
Cameron Menzies 99.65	4
James Wade 96.38	6
Gabriel Clemens 95.01	6
Martin Lukeman 95.54	5
Marko Kantele 90.63	3
Alt	Scott Williams 100.73	6
Brendan Dolan 86.68	5
Peter Wright 90.34	6
Luke Woodhouse 101.88	6
Luc Bogaert 94.02	3
Krzysztof Ratajski 93.07	3
Robert Owen 92.82	6
Jitse van der Wal 89.57	6
Sebastian Białecki 85.84	2
François Schweyen 90.61	4
Kevin Doets 90.13	6

Second round (best of 11 legs); 7 September
1	Luke Humphries 100.66	6
Ritchie Edhouse 96.37	3
16	Ryan Joyce 93.16	6
Alan Soutar 94.98	5
8	Ryan Searle 94.35	6
Joe Cullen 91.43	4
9	Ross Smith 101.29	6
Alt	Mike De Decker 93.62	5
4	Damon Heta 90.38	5
Dirk van Duijvenbode 97.61	6
13	Luke Littler 111.13	6
Jermaine Wattimena 101.57	1
5	Danny Noppert 92.72	6
Raymond van Barneveld 90.74	2
12	Ricardo Pietreczko 99.29	6
Andrew Gilding 93.64	5
2	Dave Chisnall 102.00	6
James Wade 94.67	2
15	Michael van Gerwen 99.93	4
Gabriel Clemens 107.27	6
7	Stephen Bunting 104.24	6
Alt	Scott Williams 93.61	3
10	Martin Schindler 89.12	2
Peter Wright 100.00	6
3	Gerwyn Price 97.88	5
Luke Woodhouse 98.59	6
14	Gian van Veen 92.94	6
Robert Owen 91.70	3
6	Josh Rock 103.66	6
Jitse van der Wal 83.04	0
11	Chris Dobey 98.62	6
Kevin Doets 87.27	2

Third round (best of 11 legs); 8 September
1	Humphries 99.17	6
16	Joyce 92.88	5
8	Searle 91.86	6
9	Smith 91.80	3
van Duijvenbode 101.38	6
13	Littler 93.79	2
5	Noppert 91.84	1
12	Pietreczko 102.94	6
2	Chisnall 100.92	6
Clemens 96.94	2
7	Bunting 93.29	5
Wright 99.13	6
Woodhouse 87.98	6
14	van Veen 92.51	5
6	Rock 97.54	5
11	Dobey 100.43	6

Quarter-finals (best of 11 legs); 8 September
1	Humphries 104.29	6
8	Searle 100.72	2
van Duijvenbode 94.69	4
12	Pietreczko 93.52	6
2	Chisnall 95.57	6
Wright 98.40	5
Woodhouse 90.55	3
11	Dobey 104.15	6

Semi-finals (best of 13 legs); 8 September
1	Humphries 98.51	4
12	Pietreczko 104.92	7
2	Chisnall 101.36	7
11	Dobey 92.72	5

Final (best of 15 legs); 8 September
12	Pietreczko 96.90	6
2	Chisnall 95.23	8
