= 2025 International Darts Open =

2025 Elten Safety Shoes International Darts Open

Tournament information
- Dates: 4–6 April 2025
- Venue: SACHSENarena
- Location: Riesa, Germany
- Organisation(s): Professional Darts Corporation (PDC)
- Format: Legs
- Prize fund: £175,000
- Winner's share: £30,000
- High checkout: 170; Stephen Bunting; Josh Rock (x2)

Champion(s)
- Stephen Bunting (ENG)

The 2025 International Darts Open (known for sponsorship reasons as the 2025 Elten Safety Shoes International Darts Open) was a professional darts tournament that took place at the SACHSENarena in Riesa, Germany from 4–6 April 2025. It was the third of fourteen PDC European Tour events on the 2025 PDC Pro Tour. It featured a field of 48 players and £175,000 in prize money, with £30,000 going to the winner.

Martin Schindler was the defending champion after defeating Gerwyn Price 8–5 in the 2024 final. However, he lost to Nathan Aspinall 7–4 in the semi-finals.

Stephen Bunting won his first European Tour title by defeating Aspinall 8–5 in the final.

== Prize money ==
The prize fund remained at £175,000, with £30,000 to the winner:

Stage (num. of players)		Prize money
Winner	(1)	£30,000
Runner-up	(1)	£12,000
Semi-finalists	(2)	£8,500
Quarter-finalists	(4)	£6,000
Third round losers	(8)	£4,000
Second round losers	(16)	£2,500*
First round losers	(16)	£1,250*
Total	£175,000	

- Pre-qualified players from the Orders of Merit who lose in their first match of the event shall not be credited with prize money on any Order of Merit. A player who qualifies as a qualifier, but later becomes a seed due to the withdrawal of one or more other players shall be credited with their prize money on all Orders of Merit regardless of how far they progress in the event.

== Qualification and format ==
In a change from the previous year, the top 16 on the two-year main PDC Order of Merit ranking will now be seeded and enter the tournament in the second round, while the 16 qualifiers from the one-year PDC Pro Tour Order of Merit ranking will enter in the first round. The seedings were confirmed on 12 February.

The remaining 16 places will go to players from four qualifying events – 10 from the Tour Card Holder Qualifier (held on 19 February), four from the Host Nation Qualifier (held on 8 February), one from the Nordic & Baltic Associate Member Qualifier (held on 15 February) and one from the East European Associate Member Qualifier (held on 2 February).

Daryl Gurney withdrew and was replaced by Callan Rydz.

After the draw was made, Michael van Gerwen withdrew and was replaced by Richard Veenstra, who went straight in at the second round. Rob Cross also withdrew, but too late for a replacement to be put in, meaning the winner of the first round match between Martin Schindler and Thomas Lovely received a bye to the third round.

The following players took part in the tournament:

Seeded Players

1. Luke Humphries (semi-finals)
2. ~~Michael van Gerwen~~ (withdrew)
3. ~~Rob Cross~~ (withdrew)
4. Stephen Bunting (champion)
5. Jonny Clayton (second round)
6. Dave Chisnall (third round)
7. Gerwyn Price (third round)
8. Damon Heta (third round)
9. Chris Dobey (second round)
10. Nathan Aspinall (runner-up)
11. Peter Wright (quarter-finals)
12. Danny Noppert (second round)
13. James Wade (second round)
14. Dimitri Van den Bergh (third round)
15. Josh Rock (quarter-finals)
16. Ross Smith (third round)

Pro Tour Order of Merit Qualifiers
- Martin Schindler (semi-finals)
- Ryan Searle (first round)
- Gian van Veen (second round)
- Raymond van Barneveld (third round)
- Mike De Decker (second round)
- Wessel Nijman (quarter-finals)
- Ritchie Edhouse (second round)
- Cameron Menzies (third round)
- Michael Smith (first round)
- Jermaine Wattimena (first round)
- Joe Cullen (second round)
- Dirk van Duijvenbode (second round)
- Luke Woodhouse (second round)
- Andrew Gilding (third round)
- Ricardo Pietreczko (second round)

Tour Card Qualifier
- Mario Vandenbogaerde (second round)
- Krzysztof Ratajski (first round)
- Radek Szagański (first round)
- Karel Sedláček (quarter-finals)
- William O'Connor (first round)
- Niko Springer (first round)
- Thibault Tricole (second round)
- Robert Owen (first round)
- Matt Campbell (first round)
- Thomas Lovely (first round)
Host Nation Qualifier
- Kevin Knopf (first round)
- Daniel Klose (first round)
- Paul Goyer (first round)
- Patrick Klingelhöfer (first round)
Nordic & Baltic Qualifier
- Darius Labanauskas (second round)
East European Qualifier
- Petr Křivka (first round)
Reserve List
- Callan Rydz (first round)
- Richard Veenstra (second round)

== Draw ==
Numbers to the left of players' names show the seedings for the top 16 in the tournament. The figures to the right of a player's name state their three-dart average in a match. Players in bold denote match winners.

**First round** (best of 11 legs); 4 April
**Dirk van Duijvenbode 101.76**	**6**
Niko Springer 101.73	3
**Ricardo Pietreczko 88.38**	**6**
Krzysztof Ratajski 85.83	2
Callan Rydz 92.96	4
**Mario Vandenbogaerde 98.60**	**6**
**Wessel Nijman 90.89**	**6**
Radek Szagański 84.67	1
Ryan Searle 100.86	3
**Darius Labanauskas 102.40**	**6**
**Cameron Menzies 89.29**	**6**
Kevin Knopf 76.56	0
**Raymond van Barneveld 103.43**	**6**
Patrick Klingelhöfer 90.79	1
Jermaine Wattimena 94.33	4
**Karel Sedláček 89.49**	**6**
**Andrew Gilding 98.61**	**6**
William O'Connor 95.18	3
**Gian van Veen 93.83**	**6**
Paul Goyer 75.17	1
**Mike De Decker 89.94**	**6**
Daniel Klose 91.86	3
**Joe Cullen 85.91**	**6**
Robert Owen 85.73	1
**Martin Schindler 102.68**	**6**
Thomas Lovely 92.47	2
Michael Smith 91.79	3
**Thibault Tricole 95.86**	**6**
**Luke Woodhouse 94.77**	**6**
Matt Campbell 91.28	3
**Ritchie Edhouse 88.50**	**6**
Petr Křivka 87.33	4

**Second round** (best of 11 legs); 5 April
**1**	**Luke Humphries 99.84**	**6**
Dirk van Duijvenbode 84.84	1
**16**	**Ross Smith 100.96**	**6**
Ricardo Pietreczko 90.47	2
**8**	**Damon Heta 88.90**	**6**
Mario Vandenbogaerde 91.67	2
9	Chris Dobey 91.89	3
**Wessel Nijman 93.65**	**6**
**4**	**Stephen Bunting 104.91**	**6**
Darius Labanauskas 101.40	4
13	James Wade 100.31	5
**Cameron Menzies 100.03**	**6**
5	Jonny Clayton 81.40	2
**Raymond van Barneveld 97.20**	**6**
12	Danny Noppert 91.88	4
**Karel Sedláček 93.32**	**6**
Alt	Richard Veenstra 82.32	0
**Andrew Gilding 92.97**	**6**
**15**	**Josh Rock 107.61**	**6**
Gian van Veen 98.16	4
**7**	**Gerwyn Price 98.59**	**6**
Mike De Decker 100.59	4
**10**	**Nathan Aspinall 91.45**	**6**
Joe Cullen 80.11	1
3	Rob Cross	w/d
**Martin Schindler**	**w/o**
**14**	**Dimitri Van den Bergh 90.68**	**6**
Thibault Tricole 86.67	4
**6**	**Dave Chisnall 97.70**	**6**
Luke Woodhouse 99.69	2
**11**	**Peter Wright 88.78**	**6**
Ritchie Edhouse 90.38	5

**Third round** (best of 11 legs); 6 April
**1**	**Humphries 104.36**	**6**
16	R Smith 94.55	2
8	Heta 92.53	2
**Nijman 88.63**	**6**
**4**	**Bunting 105.51**	**6**
Menzies 95.26	4
van Barneveld 97.89	5
**Sedláček 104.52**	**6**
Gilding 95.42	4
**15**	**Rock 91.99**	**6**
7	Price 105.24	5
**10**	**Aspinall 103.02**	**6**
**Schindler 100.20**	**6**
14	Van den Bergh 91.86	0
6	Chisnall 92.85	1
**11**	**Wright 98.01**	**6**

**Quarter-finals** (best of 11 legs); 6 April
**1**	**Humphries 103.14**	**6**
Nijman 98.24	3
**4**	**Bunting 94.69**	**6**
Sedláček 85.27	2
15	Rock 92.38	2
**10**	**Aspinall 97.14**	**6**
**Schindler 97.79**	**6**
11	Wright 88.86	2

**Semi-finals** (best of 13 legs); 6 April
1	Humphries 103.99	6
**4**	**Bunting 101.95**	**7**
**10**	**Aspinall 104.11**	**7**
Schindler 93.83	4

**Final** (best of 15 legs); 6 April
**4**	**Bunting 100.19**	**8**
10	Aspinall 91.36	5

== Top averages ==
The table lists all players who achieved an average of at least 100 in a match. In the case one player has multiple records, this is indicated by the number in brackets.

#	Player	Round	Average	Result
1	Josh Rock	2	107.61	Won
2	Stephen Bunting	3	105.51	Won
3	Gerwyn Price	3	105.24	Lost
4	Stephen Bunting (2)	2	104.91	Won
5	Karel Sedláček	3	104.52	Won
6	Luke Humphries	3	104.36	Won
7	Nathan Aspinall	SF	104.11	Won
8	Luke Humphries (2)	SF	103.99	Lost
9	Raymond van Barneveld	1	103.43	Won
10	Luke Humphries (2)	QF	103.14	Won
11	Nathan Aspinall (2)	3	103.02	Won
12	Martin Schindler	1	102.68	Won
13	Darius Labanauskas	1	102.40	Won
14	Stephen Bunting (3)	SF	101.95	Won
15	Dirk van Duijvenbode	1	101.76	Won
16	Niko Springer	1	101.73	Lost
17	Darius Labanauskas (2)	2	101.40	Lost
18	Ross Smith	2	100.96	Won
19	Ryan Searle	1	100.86	Lost
20	Mike De Decker	2	100.59	Lost
21	James Wade	2	100.31	Lost
22	Martin Schindler (2)	3	100.20	Won
23	Stephen Bunting (4)	Final	100.19	Won
24	Cameron Menzies	2	100.00	Won
