= 2025 European Darts Grand Prix =

2025 Elten Safety Shoes European Darts Grand Prix

Tournament information
- Dates: 2–4 May 2025
- Venue: Glaspalast
- Location: Sindelfingen, Germany
- Organisation(s): Professional Darts Corporation (PDC)
- Format: Legs
- Prize fund: £175,000
- Winner's share: £30,000
- High checkout: 170 Dirk van Duijvenbode

Champion(s)
- Gary Anderson

The 2025 European Darts Grand Prix (known for sponsorship reasons as the 2025 Elten Safety Shoes European Darts Grand Prix) was the sixth of fourteen PDC European Tour events on the 2025 PDC Pro Tour. The tournament took place at the Glaspalast, Sindelfingen, Germany, from 2 to 4 May 2025. It featured a field of 48 players and £175,000 in prize money, with £30,000 going to the winner.

Gary Anderson was the defending champion after defeating Ross Smith 8–6 in the 2024 final.

Anderson became the first person to successfully defend the title by beating Andrew Gilding 8–0.

== Prize money ==
The prize fund remained at £175,000, with £30,000 to the winner:

Stage (num. of players)		Prize money
Winner	(1)	£30,000
Runner-up	(1)	£12,000
Semi-finalists	(2)	£8,000
Quarter-finalists	(4)	£6,000
Third round losers	(8)	£4,000
Second round losers	(16)	£2,500*
First round losers	(16)	£1,250*
Total	£175,000	

- Pre-qualified players from the Orders of Merit who lose in their first match of the event shall not be credited with prize money on any Order of Merit. A player who qualifies as a qualifier, but later becomes a seed due to the withdrawal of one or more other players shall be credited with their prize money on all Orders of Merit regardless of how far they progress in the event.

== Qualification and format ==
In a change from the previous year, the top 16 on the two-year main PDC Order of Merit ranking were now seeded and entered the tournament in the second round, while the 16 qualifiers from the one-year PDC Pro Tour Order of Merit ranking entered in the first round. The seedings were confirmed on 27 March.

The remaining 16 places went to players from four qualifying events – 10 from the Tour Card Holder Qualifier (held on 2 April), four from the Host Nation Qualifier (held on 9 February), one from the Nordic & Baltic Associate Member Qualifier (held on 29 March), and one from the East European Associate Member Qualifier (held on 15 February).

Luke Littler and Daryl Gurney withdrew and were replaced by Martin Lukeman and William O'Connor. Michael Smith moved up to become the 16th seed.

The following players took part in the tournament:

Seeded Players

1. Luke Humphries (third round)
2. Michael van Gerwen (second round)
3. Rob Cross (third round)
4. Jonny Clayton (second round)
5. Stephen Bunting (second round)
6. Damon Heta (second round)
7. Nathan Aspinall (second round)
8. Chris Dobey (second round)
9. Dave Chisnall (second round)
10. James Wade (quarter-finals)
11. Gerwyn Price (second round)
12. Peter Wright (quarter-finals)
13. Danny Noppert (third round)
14. Gary Anderson (champion)
15. Josh Rock (second round)
16. Michael Smith (quarter-finals)

Pro Tour Order of Merit Qualifiers
- Martin Schindler (third round)
- Ross Smith (third round)
- Ryan Searle (first round)
- Gian van Veen (second round)
- Mike De Decker (second round)
- Cameron Menzies (third round)
- Wessel Nijman (second round)
- Ritchie Edhouse (first round)
- Joe Cullen (second round)
- Luke Woodhouse (semi-finals)
- Raymond van Barneveld (third round)
- Jermaine Wattimena (first round)
- Andrew Gilding (runner-up)
- Ryan Joyce (first round)

Tour Card Qualifier
- Connor Scutt (second round)
- Dirk van Duijvenbode (semi-finals)
- Leon Weber (second round)
- Krzysztof Ratajski (first round)
- Max Hopp (first round)
- Bradley Brooks (first round)
- Gabriel Clemens (first round)
- Niels Zonneveld (third round)
- Callan Rydz (first round)
- Nathan Rafferty (first round)

Host Nation Qualifier
- Michael Unterbuchner (first round)
- Marcel Erba (first round)
- Paul Krohne (first round)
- Daniel Klose (second round)

Nordic & Baltic Qualifier
- Johan Engström (first round)

East European Qualifier
- Benjamin Pratnemer (first round)

Reserve List
- Martin Lukeman (quarter-finals)
- William O'Connor (first round)

== Draw ==
First round (best of 11 legs); 2 May
Ritchie Edhouse 88.02	2
Connor Scutt 87.90	6
Jermaine Wattimena 92.96	3
Daniel Klose 95.85	6
Luke Woodhouse 88.64	6
Johan Engström 93.35	3
Ross Smith 108.65	6
Paul Krohne 96.63	0
Andrew Gilding 100.47	6
Gabriel Clemens 96.13	5
Wessel Nijman 86.50	6
Bradley Brooks 75.58	2
Cameron Menzies 87.63	6
Michael Unterbuchner 78.32	2
Ryan Joyce 97.07	3
Leon Weber 92.76	6
William O'Connor 87.65	2
Dirk van Duijvenbode 95.05	6
Martin Schindler 94.26	6
Callan Rydz 87.72	3
Ryan Searle 85.80	1
Niels Zonneveld 87.96	6
Joe Cullen 93.94	6
Marcel Erba 76.56	0
Mike De Decker 86.17	6
Max Hopp 85.48	4
Gian van Veen 90.35	6
Nathan Rafferty 87.78	3
Martin Lukeman 93.44	6
Benjamin Pratnemer 92.26	3
Raymond van Barneveld 94.31	6
Krzysztof Ratajski 96.32	3

Second round (best of 11 legs); 3 May
1	Luke Humphries 98.80	6
Connor Scutt 89.70	1
16	Michael Smith 88.03	6
Daniel Klose 89.62	5
8	Chris Dobey 98.65	4
Luke Woodhouse 96.37	6
9	Dave Chisnall 92.40	3
Ross Smith 91.92	6
4	Jonny Clayton 92.77	5
Andrew Gilding 92.71	6
13	Danny Noppert 89.69	6
Wessel Nijman 91.91	5
5	Stephen Bunting 101.14	2
Cameron Menzies 98.54	6
12	Peter Wright 105.34	6
Leon Weber 94.74	4
2	Michael van Gerwen 89.52	3
Dirk van Duijvenbode 101.34	6
15	Josh Rock 93.78	4
Martin Schindler 92.71	6
7	Nathan Aspinall 88.36	2
Niels Zonneveld 96.99	6
10	James Wade 91.85	6
Joe Cullen 94.13	4
3	Rob Cross 96.74	6
Mike De Decker 100.55	3
14	Gary Anderson 110.16	6
Gian van Veen 99.43	5
6	Damon Heta 89.16	2
Martin Lukeman 96.20	6
11	Gerwyn Price 98.78	5
Raymond van Barneveld 97.81	6

Third round (best of 11 legs); 4 May
1	Humphries 100.77	5
16	M. Smith 106.53	6
Woodhouse 98.91	6
R. Smith 98.98	3
Gilding 110.77	6
13	Noppert 104.03	3
Menzies 98.27	5
12	Wright 99.71	6
van Duijvenbode 111.66	6
Schindler 93.26	2
Zonneveld 82.97	2
10	Wade 86.75	6
3	Cross 85.66	3
14	Anderson 94.37	6
Lukeman 102.91	6
van Barneveld 97.59	5

Quarter-finals (best of 11 legs); 4 May
16	M. Smith 98.04	5
Woodhouse 98.08	6
Gilding 95.50	6
12	Wright 95.59	1
van Duijvenbode 94.47	6
10	Wade 90.57	5
14	Anderson 87.88	6
Lukeman 86.53	5

Semi-finals (best of 13 legs); 4 May
Woodhouse 84.89	3
Gilding 88.71	7
van Duijvenbode 93.56	2
14	Anderson 106.22	7

Final (best of 15 legs); 4 May
Gilding 85.59	0
14	Anderson 92.49	8
