= Andrew Gilding =

English darts player (born 1970)

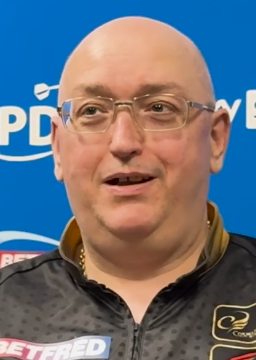
- Gilding at the 2025 World Matchplay

Personal information
- Nickname: "Goldfinger"
- Born: 7 December 1970 (age 55) Earsham, Norfolk, England

Sport
- Sport: Darts
- Playing since: 1990
- Darts: 25g Cosmo Goldfinger
- Laterality: Right-handed
- Walk-on music: "Gold" by Spandau Ballet

Organisation (see split in darts)
- BDO: 2010–2012
- PDC: 2012–present (Tour Card: 2012–2018; 2021–)
- Current world ranking: (PDC) 27 (5 November 2026)

WDF major events – best performances
- World Masters: Last 16: 2011

PDC premier events – best performances
- World Championship: Last 32: 2016, 2017, 2025, 2026
- World Matchplay: Quarter-final: 2024, 2025
- World Grand Prix: Quarter-final: 2023
- UK Open: Winner (1): 2023
- Grand Slam: Last 16: 2023
- European Championship: Last 16: 2024
- PC Finals: Last 16: 2024, 2025
- Masters: Last 24: 2024
- World Series Finals: Last 32: 2024

Other tournament wins
- Years
Gibraltar Open	2011
Players Championships (×1)
2026

Andrew Gilding (born 7 December 1970) is an English professional darts player who competes in Professional Darts Corporation (PDC) events. Nicknamed "Goldfinger", Gilding won his maiden PDC title at the 2023 UK Open, defeating Michael van Gerwen 11–10 in the final. He also made the semi-finals at the 2015 UK Open and is a two-time World Matchplay quarter-finalist. After finishing as the runner-up at seven ranking events on the PDC Pro Tour, Gilding won his first Pro Tour title at Players Championship 16 in 2026.

== Career ==
A former butcher and factory worker, Gilding was a relative latecomer to darts; he started playing in his 30s as part of a pub team. He made his television debut at the 2011 UK Open at the Reebok Stadium in Bolton as a pub qualifier. He defeated Brendan Dolan, Matt Clark and Andy Hamilton before losing 9–2 to Mark Hylton in the last 32 earning himself £2,000 in the process.

Gilding's best result of 2012 was getting to the quarter-finals at the UK Open Qualifier 7 at the NIA Community Hall, Birmingham defeating Joe Cullen, Scott Rand, Mark Hylton and Simon Whitlock before losing 6–3 to Kevin Painter. He headed into 2013 ranked world number 73. Gilding failed to qualify for the 2013 UK Open as he finished 142nd on the Order of Merit, outside of the top 96 who claimed their places. In October, he reached his first semi-final in a PDC ranking event at the tenth Players Championship of the year. Gilding saw off the likes of Dave Chisnall and 2008 BDO World Championship winner Mark Webster before losing 6–2 to five-time world champion Raymond van Barneveld. However, at the end of the year his tour card status expired and Gilding was ranked 78th in the world, outside the top 64 who remain on the tour. He entered Q School in an attempt to regain his place and was successful on the first day by beating Jamie Bain 5–0 in his last match.

=== 2014 ===
Gilding reached his first career PDC final at the second UK Open Qualifier, beating the likes of Raymond van Barneveld, James Wade and Phil Taylor to face reigning BDO World Champion Stephen Bunting. He lost 6–5 in a thrilling final but earned £5,000 which saw him qualify for the UK Open. He entered the tournament in the third round and received a bye as Wes Newton withdrew, before being defeated 9–4 by Kevin Painter. He reached his second PDC final just a month later at the first Players Championship in Barnsley. He defeated Jamie Caven, Jelle Klaasen, Michael Smith, Darren Webster and James Wade before he lost 6–5 to Gary Anderson despite averaging a superb 107.70.

Gilding's performances on the Pro Tour during 2014 saw him make his debut at the World Matchplay, where he was whitewashed 10–0 by Adrian Lewis. He also played in the World Grand Prix for the first time and beat Darren Webster 2–0 (sets) in the first round. Gilding faced 11-time winner of the event Phil Taylor in the next round and won the first set, but went on to be defeated 3–1. At the Players Championship Finals he was beaten 6–3 by Mervyn King in the first round.

=== 2015 ===
Gilding earned £25,000 on the Pro Tour Order of Merit during 2014 to be the highest non-qualified player for the 2015 World Championship. He made his debut in the event against Robert Thornton and could only win two legs during the match in a 3–0 loss. His good year saw him start 2015 ranked world number 38, an increase of 40 places from 12 month ago. A semi-final defeat in the fourth qualifier saw Gilding enter the UK Open at the third round stage and he whitewashed Kevin Painter 9–0. Further victories over Jelle Klaasen (9–5) and James Wade (9–6) followed as he reached the quarter-finals of a major event for the first time in his career. Gilding faced Austria's Mensur Suljović and beat him 10–8 to set up a semi-final with world number one Michael van Gerwen. Gilding played the match of his career to date as he averaged 108.37, hit 10 180s and a 10 darter, but it wasn't quite enough to progress to the final as his tournament ended with a 10–8 loss. The £17,000 in prize money he earned saw him achieve his year's goal of breaking into the top 32 on the Order of Merit.

Gilding won his first match at the World Matchplay by holding on from 7–2 ahead of Mervyn King to triumph 10–8. He lost 13–7 to Peter Wright in the second round. Gilding could only win one leg in the first round of the World Grand Prix during a 2–0 set defeat against Simon Whitlock.

=== 2016 ===
After whitewashing Gerwyn Price 3–0 in the first round of the 2016 World Championship, Gilding lost 4–0 to Adrian Lewis picking up just two legs in the process. He was beaten 6–5 by Ryan de Vreede in the second round of the UK Open. Gilding reached the semi-finals of the 10th Players Championship which included a 6–0 thrashing of Jelle Klaasen, but he suffered a 6–0 loss to Dave Chisnall. He qualified for the Players Championship Finals and was edged out 6–5 by Vincent van der Voort.

=== 2017–2021 ===
Gilding was 2–0 down in sets to John Henderson in the opening round of the 2017 World Championship, but rallied to draw level at 2–2. He survived one match dart from Henderson in the deciding set and it would go to a sudden-death leg. Gilding won the bull to throw first and took out a 75 finish to progress. He lost all four sets by three legs to one in the second round against reigning champion Gary Anderson.

In November 2018, Gilding qualified for the 2018 Grand Slam of Darts, where he finished last in his round robin group, after losing to Gerwyn Price and Simon Whitlock, his only win came in the last match against Glen Durrant.

After failing to qualify for the last year's tournament, Gilding secured his spot in the 2018 Players Championship Finals as the 43rd seed. He was eliminated by Gabriel Clemens in the first round.

Gilding did not qualify for 2019 PDC World Darts Championship, fell out of top 64 and lost his Tour card.

Gilding went immediately to UK Q-school trying to get his Tour card back. He made it to last 16 on the third day, but failed in other three tournaments and did not retain the card.

He started well on PDC Challenge Tour and after making it to quarterfinals and semifinals he was placed high in the rankings of this tour.

Gilding reached the final of the second tournament of the 2020 PDC Challenge Tour.

On his third attempt to regain the Tour card, Gilding was successful via Q-school Order of Merit. He placed 2nd overall after consistent results throughout all four days of Final Stage, into which he received automatic spot after finishing in the Top 16 of the 2020 PDC Challenge Tour Order of Merit. Gilding featured in the UK Open for the first time since 2018, and was eliminated in the 3rd round.

=== 2022 ===
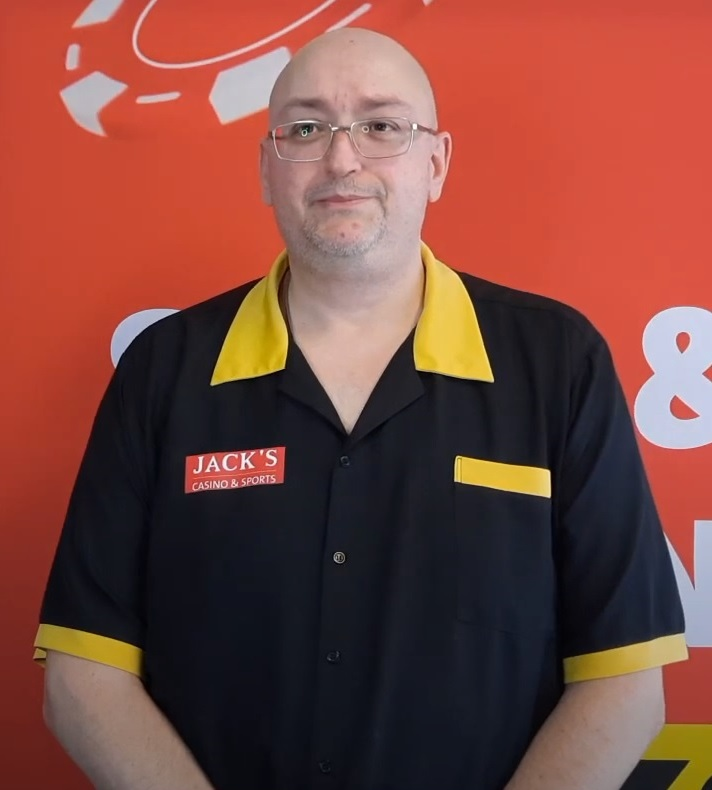
Gilding in 2022

Andrew Gilding reached the final of the 2022 Belgian Darts Open losing to Dave Chisnall 6–8 in legs.

=== 2023 ===
At the 2023 UK Open, Gilding reached a first televised final and won his first PDC major title, surviving a match dart to defeat Michael van Gerwen 11–10. The £110,000 received in prize money saw him rise up to 25th in the world having been 41st prior to the weekend.

At the 2023 World Grand Prix, Gilding reached the quarter-finals for the first time. He won his first two games before losing to Michael Smith 3–0.

=== 2024 ===
Gilding entered the second round of the 2024 World Championship as the 20th seed, but lost 3–1 to eventual runner-up Luke Littler. In his defence of the UK Open, he defeated Josh Payne 10–7 in the fourth round but lost 10–1 to Peter Wright in the fifth round. He reached his first World Matchplay quarter-final with wins over Wright and Krzysztof Ratajski. He was eliminated in a 16–10 defeat to Michael van Gerwen. At the European Championship, he achieved a surprise 6–4 victory over Littler in the first round.

=== 2025–present ===
Entering the second round of the 2025 World Championship, Gilding defeated Martin Lukeman 3–1, before losing 4–0 to Nathan Aspinall in the third round. In May 2025, he reached the final of the European Darts Grand Prix, but suffered an 8–0 defeat to Gary Anderson. He made a second successive appearance in the quarter-finals of the World Matchplay after defeating Dirk van Duijvenbode 11–5. He was beaten 16–14 by eventual champion Luke Littler.

Following a first-round victory over Cam Crabtree, Gilding defeated eighth seed Chris Dobey 3–1 in the second round of the 2026 World Championship. He was beaten 4–1 by Luke Woodhouse in the third round. In February 2026, he reached the final of Players Championship 6, where he lost 8–1 to Gerwyn Price. In his 442nd Pro Tour event, Gilding won his first Pro Tour title at Players Championship 16 by beating Jonny Clayton 8–3 in the final. He reached his third ranking final of the year at Players Championship 18, losing 8–4 to Woodhouse.

== Style of play ==
Gilding took on the nickname "Goldfinger" because he played with a set of Phil Taylor golden darts and partially because of his surname. In a 2023 interview, he said he would like "Goldfinger" by Shirley Bassey to have been his walk-on song, but that copyright issues prevented him from doing so. To this day he still plays with a set of custom gold darts.

After hitting a double or a 180, Gilding is known to frequently do a thumbs up gesture, which has become a signature celebration of his.

== Personal life ==
Gilding has spoken about experiencing depression from his late teens to his early thirties, and has stated that both his father and grandfather also experienced the condition. He credited involvement in darts and playing guitar in a church band with helping him recover.

== World Championship results ==
=== PDC World Championship ===
- 2015: First round (lost to Robert Thornton 0–3)
- 2016: Second round (lost to Adrian Lewis 0–4)
- 2017: Second round (lost to Gary Anderson 0–4)
- 2023: Second round (lost to Dave Chisnall 1–3)
- 2024: Second round (lost to Luke Littler 1–3)
- 2025: Third round (lost to Nathan Aspinall 0–4)
- 2026: Third round (lost to Luke Woodhouse 1–4)

== Career finals ==
=== PDC major finals: 1 (1 title) ===
Legend
UK Open (1–0)

Outcome	No.	Year	Championship	Opponent in the final	Score (Note: (l) = score in legs, (s) = score in sets.)
Winner	1.	2023	UK Open	Michael van Gerwen	11–10 (l)

== Performance timeline ==
Gilding's performance timeline is as follows:

=== BDO ===
Tournament	2011
BDO Ranked televised events
World Masters	6R

=== PDC ===
Tournament	2011	2012	2013	2014	2015	2016	2017	2018	2019	2020	2021	2022	2023	2024	2025	2026
PDC Ranked televised events
World Championship	Did not qualify				1R	2R	2R	Did not qualify					2R	2R	3R	3R
World Masters (Note: A non-ranked event until 2025)	NH		Did not qualify											1R	1R	Prel.
UK Open	4R	2R	DNQ	4R	SF	2R	3R	2R	DNQ		3R	2R	W	5R	4R	4R
World Matchplay	Did not qualify			1R	2R	Did not qualify						1R	1R	QF	QF	1R
World Grand Prix	Did not qualify			2R	1R	Did not qualify						1R	QF	DNQ	1R	1R
European Championship	Did not qualify											1R	1R	2R	DNQ	1R
Grand Slam (Note: A non-ranked event until 2015)	Did not qualify							RR	Did not qualify				2R	DNQ		RR
Players Championship Finals	Did not qualify			1R	DNQ	1R	DNQ	1R	Did not qualify			2R	1R	3R	3R	
PDC Non-ranked televised events
World Series Finals	Not held				Did not qualify									1R	DNQ	
Career statistics
Year-end ranking (PDC)	-	107	80	38	25	33	57	78	123	146	122	41	18	20	33	

==== European Tour ====
Season	1	2	3	4	5	6	7	8	9	10	11	12	13	14	15
2012	Did not qualify			GDM; 1R	DDM; DNQ										
2013	Did not qualify							DDM; 1R							
2014	DNQ		GDM; 3R	ADO; 2R	DNQ		EDG; 2R	EDT; 2R							
2015	GDC; DNQ	GDT; 1R	GDM; 3R	DNQ		EDO; 1R	Did not qualify								
2016	DDM; DNQ	GDM; 1R	GDT; DNQ	EDM; 1R	Did not qualify										
2017	GDC; DNQ	GDM; 1R	Did not qualify							GDG; 1R	DNQ				
2018	Did not qualify									GDC; 2R	DNQ		EDT; 1R		
2019	EDO; DNQ	GDC; 2R	DNQ		ADO; 1R	Did not qualify			CDO; 3R	Did not qualify					
2022	Did not qualify				EDO; 2R	CDO; DNQ	EDG; 3R	DDC; SF	DNQ			BDO; F	GDT; DNQ		
2023	DNQ		IDO; 2R	GDG; QF	ADO; 3R	DDC; 3R	BDO; 2R	CDO; 3R	EDG; 2R	EDM; 2R	GDO; QF	HDT; 1R	GDC; DNQ		
2024	BDO; 1R	GDG; 1R	IDO; 1R	EDG; 1R	ADO; 2R	BSD; 3R	DDC; 2R	EDO; 1R	GDC; 3R	FDT; 2R	HDT; 2R	SDT; 2R	CDO; DNQ		
2025	BDO; DNQ	EDT; 2R	IDO; 3R	GDG; 2R	ADO; 1R	EDG; F	DDC; 1R	EDO; 3R	BSD; WD	FDT; 1R	CDO; 2R	HDT; 1R	SDT; 1R	GDC; 1R	
2026	PDO; 2R	EDT; 1R	BDO; DNQ	GDG; QF	EDG; 2R	ADO; QF	IDO; 1R	BSD; 2R	SDO; QF	EDO; 1R	HDT; 2R	CDO; 3R	FDT; 1R	SDT; 1R	DDC; 2R

==== Players Championships ====
Season	1	2	3	4	5	6	7	8	9	10	11	12	13	14	15	16	17	18	19	20	21	22	23	24	25	26	27	28	29	30	31	32	33	34
2012	ALI; DNP		REA; 1R	REA; 2R	CRA; 3R	CRA; 1R	BIR; 3R	BIR; 1R	CRA; 2R	CRA; 3R	BAR; 2R	BAR; 1R	DUB; 2R	DUB; 1R	KIL; 2R	KIL; 3R	CRA; 1R	CRA; 2R	BAR; 4R	BAR; 1R														
2013	WIG; 2R	WIG; 1R	WIG; DNP		CRA; 1R	CRA; 1R	BAR; 2R	BAR; 1R	DUB; 1R	DUB; SF	KIL; 2R	KIL; 1R	WIG; 1R	WIG; QF	BAR; 2R	BAR; 3R																		
2014	BAR; F	BAR; 1R	CRA; 1R	CRA; 2R	WIG; 1R	WIG; 4R	WIG; 1R	WIG; QF	CRA; 1R	CRA; 4R	COV; 1R	COV; 1R	CRA; 1R	CRA; 2R	DUB; QF	DUB; 3R	CRA; 1R	CRA; 4R	COV; 3R	COV; 2R														
2015	BAR; 1R	BAR; SF	BAR; 3R	BAR; 3R	BAR; 2R	COV; 2R	COV; 1R	COV; 2R	CRA; 2R	CRA; QF	BAR; 2R	BAR; 1R	WIG; SF	WIG; 1R	BAR; 3R	BAR; 2R	DUB; 2R	DUB; 1R	COV; 3R	COV; 2R														
2016	BAR; 1R	BAR; QF	BAR; 3R	BAR; 2R	BAR; 3R	BAR; 3R	BAR; 1R	COV; 2R	COV; 4R	BAR; SF	BAR; 1R	BAR; 1R	BAR; 3R	BAR; 1R	BAR; 3R	BAR; 2R	DUB; 3R	DUB; 1R	BAR; 1R	BAR; 3R														
2017	BAR; 1R	BAR; 1R	BAR; 1R	BAR; 2R	MIL; 3R	MIL; 1R	BAR; DNP		WIG; 4R	WIG; 2R	MIL; 2R	MIL; 1R	WIG; 2R	WIG; 1R	BAR; 2R	BAR; 1R	BAR; 2R	BAR; 1R	DUB; QF	DUB; 2R	BAR; 1R	BAR; 1R												
2018	BAR; 2R	BAR; DNP	BAR; 2R	BAR; 3R	MIL; 1R	MIL; 1R	BAR; 1R	BAR; 3R	WIG; 1R	WIG; 2R	MIL; DNP	MIL; 2R	WIG; 1R	WIG; 1R	BAR; 1R	BAR; 4R	BAR; 4R	BAR; 2R	DUB; SF	DUB; 4R	BAR; 3R	BAR; 2R												
2019 (Note: Not a Tour card holder)	WIG; 4R	WIG; 1R	Did not participate												BAR; 1R	BAR; 1R	WIG; 1R	WIG; 1R	BAR; 2R	BAR; 1R	HIL; 2R	HIL; 1R	BAR; 2R	BAR; 1R	BAR; DNP		DUB; 1R	DUB; 2R	BAR; 1R	BAR; 2R				
2020	DNP			WIG; 3R	WIG; 1R	WIG; DNP	BAR; 3R	BAR; 1R	MIL; 1R	MIL; 1R	MIL; 3R	MIL; 2R	MIL; 1R	NIE; 2R	NIE; 1R	NIE; 1R	NIE; 2R	NIE; 2R	Did not participate															
2021	BOL; 1R	BOL; 1R	BOL; 1R	BOL; 1R	MIL; 1R	MIL; 2R	MIL; 1R	MIL; 2R	NIE; 2R	NIE; 1R	NIE; 1R	NIE; 1R	MIL; 1R	MIL; 2R	MIL; 2R	MIL; 2R	COV; 1R	COV; 1R	COV; 1R	COV; 1R	BAR; 2R	BAR; 4R	BAR; 1R	BAR; 2R	BAR; 1R	BAR; 1R	BAR; 3R	BAR; 1R	BAR; 1R	BAR; 2R				
2022	BAR; 1R	BAR; 2R	WIG; 1R	WIG; 2R	BAR; 3R	BAR; 3R	NIE; DNP		BAR; F	BAR; 1R	BAR; 2R	BAR; 2R	BAR; 3R	WIG; 4R	WIG; 2R	NIE; QF	NIE; 1R	BAR; QF	BAR; F	BAR; 4R	BAR; 2R	BAR; 2R	BAR; 4R	BAR; 1R	BAR; 2R	BAR; 1R	BAR; 1R	BAR; 1R	BAR; 2R	BAR; 4R				
2023	BAR; 1R	BAR; 3R	BAR; QF	BAR; 3R	BAR; 1R	BAR; 2R	HIL; 2R	HIL; 1R	WIG; 1R	WIG; 4R	LEI; 2R	LEI; SF	HIL; 2R	HIL; QF	LEI; 3R	LEI; QF	HIL; QF	HIL; 4R	BAR; 4R	BAR; 1R	BAR; 3R	BAR; 3R	BAR; 2R	BAR; 2R	BAR; 2R	BAR; 4R	BAR; 4R	BAR; 3R	BAR; 2R	BAR; 1R				
2024	WIG; 3R	WIG; 2R	LEI; 2R	LEI; 1R	HIL; 1R	HIL; 2R	LEI; 2R	LEI; QF	HIL; 4R	HIL; 3R	HIL; 2R	HIL; 1R	MIL; QF	MIL; 1R	MIL; 3R	MIL; 1R	MIL; 2R	MIL; 3R	MIL; 1R	WIG; 3R	WIG; 2R	LEI; 1R	LEI; 3R	WIG; 3R	WIG; SF	WIG; 1R	WIG; 3R	WIG; 3R	LEI; 3R	LEI; 2R				
2025	WIG; SF	WIG; 2R	ROS; DNP		LEI; 2R	LEI; 3R	HIL; 2R	HIL; 3R	LEI; QF	LEI; 1R	LEI; 2R	LEI; 2R	ROS; SF	ROS; 2R	HIL; DNP	HIL; 1R	LEI; 1R	LEI; 2R	LEI; SF	LEI; 3R	LEI; SF	HIL; 1R	HIL; 2R	MIL; 2R	MIL; 1R	HIL; 1R	HIL; 2R	LEI; 1R	LEI; 1R	LEI; 4R	WIG; DNP		WIG; 1R	WIG; 3R
2026	HIL; 2R	HIL; 1R	WIG; 2R	WIG; 4R	LEI; 2R	LEI; F	LEI; 1R	LEI; 3R	WIG; SF	WIG; 1R	MIL; QF	MIL; 2R	HIL; QF	HIL; 1R	LEI; 2R	LEI; W	LEI; 4R	LEI; F	MIL; 4R	MIL; 2R	WIG; 3R	WIG; 4R	LEI; 1R	LEI; 3R	HIL; 2R	HIL; 2R	LEI; 1R	LEI; 1R	ROS; 3R	ROS; 1R	ROS; 1R	ROS; 2R	LEI; 2R	LEI; 2R

Performance Table Legend
W	Won the tournament	F	Finalist	SF	Semifinalist	QF	Quarterfinalist	#R; RR; Prel.	Lost in # round Round-robin; Preliminary round	DQ	Disqualified
DNQ	Did not qualify	DNP	Did not participate	WD	Withdrew	NH	Tournament not held	#R; RR; Prel.	Lost in # round Round-robin; Preliminary round	NYF	Not yet founded
