= Martin Lukeman =

English darts player (born 1985)

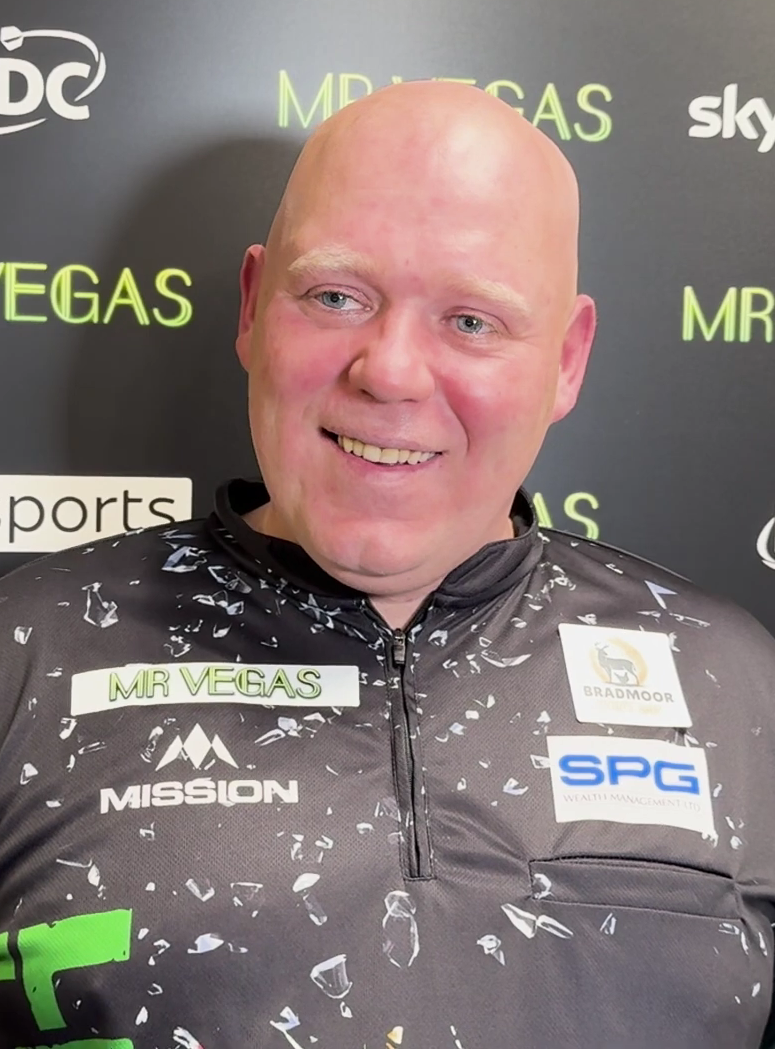
- Lukeman at the 2024 Grand Slam of Darts

Personal information
- Nickname: "Smash"
- Born: 26 March 1985 (age 41) Hammersmith, England
- Home town: Watford, Hertfordshire, England

Sport
- Sport: Darts
- Playing since: 2011
- Darts: 25g Mission Signature
- Laterality: Right-handed
- Walk-on music: "Lip Up Fatty" by Bad Manners

Organisation (see split in darts)
- PDC: 2015–present (Tour Card: 2021–present)
- Current world ranking: (PDC) 43 (5 November 2026)

PDC premier events – best performances
- World Championship: Last 64: 2023, 2024, 2025
- World Matchplay: Last 32: 2022
- World Grand Prix: Quarter-final: 2022
- UK Open: Quarter-final: 2024
- Grand Slam: Runner-up: 2024
- European Championship: Last 32: 2022
- PC Finals: Last 64: 2022, 2023, 2024, 2025

Other tournament wins
- Years
PDC Challenge Tour	2015

Martin Lukeman (born 26 March 1985) is an English professional darts player who competes in Professional Darts Corporation (PDC) events. Nicknamed "Smash", he reached his first PDC major final at the 2024 Grand Slam of Darts, finishing as runner-up to Luke Littler. He finished as runner-up at the 2022 German Darts Grand Prix on the PDC European Tour, and was a quarter-finalist at the 2022 World Grand Prix and the 2024 UK Open. Lukeman also won a title on the PDC Challenge Tour in 2015.

== Career ==
=== 2017–2021 ===
Lukeman managed to reach the last 16 of the 2017 UK Open. After last-leg wins against Matt Padgett and Rob Hewson, he defeated Chris Dobey 10–5 in the fourth round, before losing 10–3 to Ian White in the fifth round.

Lukeman secured a two-year PDC Tour Card at UK Qualifying School in February 2021, sealing his professional status with a day to spare.

=== 2022 ===
Lukeman reached his maiden PDC European Tour final at the 2022 German Darts Grand Prix by defeating Adam Gawlas, Gabriel Clemens, Keane Barry, Martin Schindler and Damon Heta. He faced Luke Humphries in the final, and was beaten 8–2. This helped him qualify for his World Matchplay debut, where he lost 10–4 to James Wade.

At the World Grand Prix in October, Lukeman defeated fifth seed James Wade and Ross Smith to reach his first PDC major quarter-final. He was denied a place in the semi-finals, losing 3–2 to Nathan Aspinall.

=== 2023–2024 ===
In his tournament debut at the 2023 PDC World Championship, Lukeman defeated Nobuhiro Yamamoto 3–0 before losing 3–1 to 29th seed Martin Schindler. He won his opening match of the following year's World Championship 3–1 against Haupai Puha, but lost to Damon Heta by the same scoreline in the second round. He was a semi-finalist at Players Championship 2, losing in a deciding leg to Ryan Searle. He reached the quarter-finals of the UK Open in March following victories over Jermaine Wattimena, Leonard Gates, Danny Noppert and Gary Anderson; he was beaten 10–5 by eventual champion Dimitri Van den Bergh.

Lukeman won four matches to qualify for the 2024 Grand Slam of Darts through the Tour Card holder qualifier. After winning his group, he defeated Ross Smith and Rob Cross before a 16–12 win over Mickey Mansell in the semi-finals made him the first qualifier to reach the final of the tournament. In his maiden PDC major final, he lost 16–3 to Luke Littler.

=== 2025–present ===
At the 2025 World Championship, Lukeman lost the opening set of his first-round match against Nitin Kumar, but won the next three to secure a 3–1 victory. He lost 3–1 to Andrew Gilding in the second round. Lukeman beat Raymond van Barneveld in a deciding leg to reach the quarter-finals of the European Darts Grand Prix on the 2025 European Tour, where he was on the receiving end of a deciding-leg loss to eventual champion Gary Anderson. Qualifying for the 2025 Grand Slam thanks to his runner-up finish the previous year, he finished last in his group following defeats to Damon Heta, Jurjen van der Velde and Chris Dobey.

Lukeman was defeated 3–1 by Max Hopp in the first round of the 2026 World Championship. He earned wins over Thomas Lovely, Ritchie Edhouse and Madars Razma en route to the last 16 of the 2026 UK Open, where he lost 10–7 to Jonny Clayton.

== World Championship results ==
=== PDC World Championship ===
- 2023: Second round (lost to Martin Schindler 1–3)
- 2024: Second round (lost to Damon Heta 1–3)
- 2025: Second round (lost to Andrew Gilding 1–3)
- 2026: First round (lost to Max Hopp 1–3)

== Career finals ==
=== PDC major finals: 1 ===
Legend
Grand Slam (0–1)

Outcome	No.	Year	Championship	Opponent in the final	Score (Note: (l) = score in legs, (s) = score in sets.)
Runner-up	1.	2024	Grand Slam	Luke Littler	3–16 (l)

== Performance timeline ==
=== PDC ===
Tournament	2017	2021	2022	2023	2024	2025	2026
PDC Ranked televised events
World Championship	Did not qualify			2R	2R	2R	1R
World Masters	Did not qualify					Prel.	Prel.
UK Open	5R	1R	4R	4R	QF	4R	6R
World Matchplay	DNQ		1R	Did not qualify			
World Grand Prix	DNQ		QF	Did not qualify			
European Championship	DNQ		1R	Did not qualify			
Grand Slam	DNQ				F	RR	DNQ
Players Championship Finals	DNQ		1R	1R	1R	1R	DNQ
Career statistics
Year-end ranking	125	117	39	35	38	37	

==== European Tour ====
Season	1	2	3	4	5	6	7	8	9	10	11	12	13	14
2022	IDO; 1R	GDC; 3R	GDG; F	ADO; DNQ	EDO; 1R	CDO; 2R	EDG; 3R	DDC; DNQ	EDM; 3R	HDT; 2R	GDO; 2R	DNQ		
2023	Did not qualify					DDC; 2R	BDO; DNQ	CDO; 2R	EDG; DNQ	EDM; 2R	DNQ		GDC; 3R	
2024	DNQ			EDG; 1R	ADO; 1R	DNQ			GDC; 1R	FDT; 1R	HDT; 2R	SDT; DNQ	CDO; 2R	
2025	BDO; DNQ	EDT; 1R	DNQ			EDG; QF	DDC; 2R	EDO; DNQ	BSD; 1R	FDT; 1R	DNQ		SDT; 1R	GDC; DNQ

==== Players Championships ====
Season	1	2	3	4	5	6	7	8	9	10	11	12	13	14	15	16	17	18	19	20	21	22	23	24	25	26	27	28	29	30	31	32	33	34
2017 (Note: Not a Tour card holder)	Did not participate													WIG; 1R	BAR; 1R	Did not participate																		
2018	Did not participate				MIL; 1R	Did not participate																												
2021	BOL; 1R	BOL; 1R	BOL; 1R	BOL; 2R	MIL; 1R	MIL; 1R	MIL; 1R	MIL; 1R	NIE; 1R	NIE; 1R	NIE; 3R	NIE; 1R	MIL; 2R	MIL; 3R	MIL; 1R	MIL; 1R	COV; 1R	COV; 2R	COV; 1R	COV; 1R	BAR; 1R	BAR; SF	BAR; 4R	BAR; 1R	DNP			BAR; 1R	BAR; 4R	BAR; 1R				
2022	BAR; 1R	BAR; 2R	WIG; 3R	WIG; 3R	BAR; 1R	BAR; 2R	NIE; 2R	NIE; 1R	BAR; 1R	BAR; 3R	BAR; 2R	BAR; 1R	BAR; QF	WIG; 4R	WIG; 2R	NIE; 4R	NIE; 4R	BAR; 2R	BAR; 4R	BAR; 1R	BAR; 1R	BAR; 1R	BAR; 3R	BAR; 2R	BAR; 2R	BAR; 2R	BAR; 4R	BAR; 2R	BAR; 1R	BAR; 1R				
2023	BAR; 1R	BAR; 1R	BAR; 3R	BAR; 1R	BAR; 2R	BAR; 1R	HIL; 3R	HIL; 1R	WIG; 2R	WIG; 1R	LEI; 1R	LEI; 2R	HIL; 1R	HIL; 3R	LEI; 2R	LEI; 1R	HIL; 3R	HIL; 2R	BAR; 2R	BAR; 1R	BAR; 1R	BAR; 1R	BAR; 4R	BAR; QF	BAR; 4R	BAR; 1R	BAR; 3R	BAR; 2R	BAR; 1R	BAR; 1R				
2024	WIG; 1R	WIG; SF	LEI; 2R	LEI; 2R	HIL; 1R	HIL; 3R	LEI; 1R	LEI; 2R	HIL; 3R	HIL; 2R	HIL; 2R	HIL; 2R	MIL; 1R	MIL; 1R	MIL; 1R	MIL; 2R	MIL; 3R	MIL; 2R	MIL; QR	WIG; 3R	WIG; 2R	MIL; 4R	MIL; QF	WIG; 2R	WIG; 1R	WIG; 3R	WIG; 2R	WIG; 3R	LEI; 2R	LEI; 1R				
2025	WIG; 2R	WIG; 1R	ROS; 4R	ROS; 2R	LEI; 4R	LEI; 3R	HIL; 2R	HIL; 1R	LEI; 1R	LEI; 2R	LEI; 3R	LEI; 4R	ROS; QF	ROS; 1R	HIL; 3R	HIL; 2R	LEI; 1R	LEI; 3R	LEI; 2R	LEI; 1R	LEI; 3R	HIL; 3R	HIL; 1R	MIL; 4R	MIL; 2R	HIL; 1R	HIL; 3R	LEI; 1R	LEI; 2R	LEI; 1R	WIG; 2R	WIG; 3R	WIG; DNP	WIG; 1R
2026	HIL; 1R	HIL; 1R	WIG; 1R	WIG; 1R	LEI; 2R	LEI; 2R	LEI; 1R	LEI; 1R	WIG; 1R	WIG; 1R	MIL; 1R	MIL; 2R	HIL; 1R	HIL; 1R	LEI; 1R	LEI; 3R	LEI; 1R	LEI; 1R	MIL; 1R	MIL; 1R	WIG; 1R	WIG; 1R	LEI; 1R	LEI; 1R	HIL; 1R	HIL; 1R	LEI; 2R	LEI; 1R	ROS; 1R	ROS; 1R	ROS; DNP		LEI; 1R	LEI; 1R

Performance Table Legend
W	Won the tournament	F	Finalist	SF	Semifinalist	QF	Quarterfinalist	#R; RR; L#	Lost in # round Round-robin; Last # stage	DQ	Disqualified
DNQ	Did not qualify	DNP	Did not participate	WD	Withdrew	NH	Tournament not held	#R; RR; L#	Lost in # round Round-robin; Last # stage	NYF	Not yet founded
