= 2022 World Matchplay =

Darts competition

2022 Betfred World Matchplay

Tournament information
- Dates: 16–24 July 2022
- Venue: Winter Gardens
- Location: Blackpool, England
- Organisation(s): Professional Darts Corporation (PDC)
- Format: Legs
- Prize fund: £800,000
- Winner's share: £200,000
- Nine-dart finish: Gerwyn Price
- High checkout: 170 Dirk van Duijvenbode

Champion(s)
- Michael van Gerwen (NED)

The 2022 Betfred World Matchplay was the 29th annual staging of the World Matchplay, organised by the Professional Darts Corporation. The tournament took place at the Winter Gardens, Blackpool, from 16 to 24 July 2022.

Peter Wright was the defending champion after defeating Dimitri Van den Bergh 18–9 in the 2021 final. However, he was defeated by Van den Bergh 16–14 in the quarter-finals, in a rematch of the previous year's final.

Michael van Gerwen won his third World Matchplay title, defeating Gerwyn Price 18–14 in the final.

Gerwyn Price hit the first nine-dart finish in the tournament for four years in his semi-final win over Danny Noppert.

This tournament also had a separate women's event which took place on the day of the final of the main tournament and was won by Fallon Sherrock.

== Format ==
All matches have to be won by two clear legs, with a match being extended if necessary for a maximum of six extra legs before a tie-break leg is required. For example, in a first to 10 legs first round match, if the score reaches 12–12 then the 25th leg will be the decider.

The matches get longer as the tournament progresses:

Round	First to (legs)
First	10
Second	11
Quarter-finals	16
Semi-finals	17
Final	18

== Prize money ==
The prize fund was increased by £100,000 and rose to £800,000.

Position (no. of players)		Prize money (Total: £800,000)
Winner	(1)	£200,000
Runner-up	(1)	£100,000
Semi-finalists	(2)	£50,000
Quarter-finalists	(4)	£30,000
Second round	(8)	£15,000
First round	(16)	£10,000

== Qualification ==
The top 16 players on the PDC Order of Merit at the cut-off point on 11 July were seeded for the tournament. The top 16 players on the ProTour Order of Merit, not to have already qualified on the cut-off date, were unseeded.

The following players qualified for the tournament:

=== PDC Order of Merit ===
1. Peter Wright (quarter-finals)
2. Gerwyn Price (runner-up)
3. Michael Smith (second round)
4. Michael van Gerwen (champion)
5. James Wade (second round)
6. Gary Anderson (first round)
7. José de Sousa (quarter-finals)
8. Jonny Clayton (first round)
9. Dimitri Van den Bergh (semi-finals)
10. Rob Cross (second round)
11. Danny Noppert (semi-finals)
12. Luke Humphries (first round)
13. Joe Cullen (second round)
14. Dirk van Duijvenbode (quarter-finals)
15. Dave Chisnall (second round)
16. Krzysztof Ratajski (second round)

=== PDC ProTour qualifiers ===
1. Damon Heta (first round)
2. Nathan Aspinall (quarter-finals)
3. Ryan Searle (first round)
4. Martin Schindler (first round)
5. Brendan Dolan (first round)
6. Daryl Gurney (second round)
7. Callan Rydz (first round)
8. Gabriel Clemens (first round)
9. Adrian Lewis (first round)
10. Andrew Gilding (first round)
11. Stephen Bunting (first round)
12. Kim Huybrechts (first round)
13. Martin Lukeman (first round)
14. Chris Dobey (first round)
15. Madars Razma (first round)
16. Rowby-John Rodriguez (second round)

== Schedule ==
Saturday, 16 July

Match #	Round	Player 1	Score	Player 2	Break 1	Break 2
01	1	Krzysztof Ratajski 98.43	10 – 6	Stephen Bunting 92.99	2 – 3	6 – 4
02	1	Dimitri Van den Bergh 100.03	10 – 2	Callan Rydz 81.99	4 – 1	8 – 2
03	1	Peter Wright 97.42	10 – 4	Madars Razma 89.42	5 – 0	8 – 2
04	1	Jonny Clayton 97.74	7 – 10	Rowby-John Rodriguez 99.00	3 – 2	4 – 6

Sunday, 17 July

Match #	Round	Player 1	Score	Player 2	Break 1	Break 2
05	1	Dirk van Duijvenbode 103.61	10 – 8	Ryan Searle 100.06	2 – 3	4 – 6
06	1	Danny Noppert 100.70	10 – 6	Brendan Dolan 94.64	2 – 3	4 – 6
07	1	Gary Anderson 92.30	7 – 10	Daryl Gurney 92.25	2 – 3	5 – 5
08	1	Michael Smith 98.23	11 – 9	Andrew Gilding 95.73	2 – 3	4 – 6
09	1	Joe Cullen 95.72	10 – 2	Damon Heta 88.93	4 – 1	9 – 1
10	1	James Wade 85.20	10 – 4	Martin Lukeman 83.18	3 – 2	7 – 3
11	1	Michael van Gerwen 89.99	10 – 7	Adrian Lewis 88.33	2 – 3	5 – 5
12	1	Luke Humphries 93.59	5 – 10	Nathan Aspinall 96.57	1 – 4	3 – 7

Monday, 18 July

Match #	Round	Player 1	Score	Player 2	Break 1	Break 2
13	1	Rob Cross 90.52	11 – 9	Chris Dobey 89.67	1 – 4	2 – 8
14	1	José de Sousa 93.55	10 – 6	Gabriel Clemens 92.77	4 – 1	7 – 3
15	1	Gerwyn Price 99.78	10 – 8	Martin Schindler 95.21	2 – 3	5 – 5
16	1	Dave Chisnall 94.56	10 – 7	Kim Huybrechts 95.30	3 – 2	5 – 5

Tuesday, 19 July

Match #	Round	Player 1	Score	Player 2	Break 1	Break 2	Break 3
17	2	Rowby-John Rodriguez 96.10	6 – 11	Dimitri Van den Bergh 98.62	2 – 3	4 – 6	—N/a
18	2	James Wade 94.55	9 – 11	Nathan Aspinall 97.28	2 – 3	5 – 5	—N/a
19	2	Peter Wright 103.50	13 – 11	Krzysztof Ratajski 98.90	4 – 1	7 – 3	10 – 10
20	2	Michael van Gerwen 97.12	11 – 5	Joe Cullen 90.19	4 – 1	6 – 4	—N/a

Wednesday, 20 July

Match #	Round	Player 1	Score	Player 2	Break 1	Break 2
21	2	Daryl Gurney 94.69	4 – 11	Danny Noppert 102.36	1 – 4	3 – 7
22	2	José de Sousa 103.26	11 – 8	Rob Cross 103.98	4 – 1	6 – 4
23	2	Gerwyn Price 98.32	11 – 8	Dave Chisnall 93.91	2 – 3	4 – 6
24	2	Michael Smith 94.22	7 – 11	Dirk van Duijvenbode 98.00	1 – 4	4 – 6

Thursday, 21 July

Match #	Round	Player 1	Score	Player 2	Break 1	Break 2	Break 3	Break 4
25	QF	Peter Wright 99.42	14 – 16	Dimitri Van den Bergh 102.01	4 – 1	5 – 5	5 – 10	8 – 12
26	QF	Michael van Gerwen 101.86	16 – 14	Nathan Aspinall 96.03	3 – 2	7 – 3	11 – 4	12 – 8

Friday, 22 July

Match #	Round	Player 1	Score	Player 2	Break 1	Break 2	Break 3	Break 4
27	QF	Dirk van Duijvenbode 97.45	11 – 16	Danny Noppert 97.38	1 – 4	4 – 6	8 – 7	9 – 11
28	QF	Gerwyn Price 104.64	16 – 14	José de Sousa 97.98	3 – 2	5 – 5	9 – 6	12 – 8

Saturday, 23 July

Match #	Round	Player 1	Score	Player 2	Break 1	Break 2	Break 3	Break 4
29	SF	Gerwyn Price 102.37	17 – 11	Danny Noppert 97.79	3 – 2	6 – 4	10 – 5	12 – 8
30	SF	Dimitri Van den Bergh 95.32	14 – 17	Michael van Gerwen 98.90	4 – 1	6 – 4	8 – 7	11 – 9

Sunday, 24 July

Match #	Round	Player 1	Score	Player 2	Break 1	Break 2	Break 3	Break 4	Break 5
31	F	Michael van Gerwen 101.19	18 – 14	Gerwyn Price 96.92	1 – 4	4 – 6	6 – 9	9 – 11	12 – 13

== Draw ==
First round (best of 19 legs); 16–18 July
1	Peter Wright 97.42	10
Madars Razma 89.42	4
16	Krzysztof Ratajski 98.43	10
Stephen Bunting 92.99	6
8	Jonny Clayton 97.74	7
Rowby-John Rodriguez 99.00	10
9	Dimitri Van den Bergh 100.03	10
Callan Rydz 81.99	2
4	Michael van Gerwen 89.66	10
Adrian Lewis 88.33	7
13	Joe Cullen 95.72	10
Damon Heta 88.93	2
5	James Wade 85.20	10
Martin Lukeman 83.18	4
12	Luke Humphries 93.59	5
Nathan Aspinall 96.57	10
2	Gerwyn Price 99.78	10
Martin Schindler 95.21	8
15	Dave Chisnall 94.56	10
Kim Huybrechts 95.30	7
7	José de Sousa 93.55	10
Gabriel Clemens 92.77	6
10	Rob Cross 90.52	11
Chris Dobey 89.67	9
3	Michael Smith 98.23	11
Andrew Gilding 95.73	9
14	Dirk van Duijvenbode 103.61	10
Ryan Searle 100.06	8
6	Gary Anderson 92.30	7
Daryl Gurney 92.25	10
11	Danny Noppert 100.70	10
Brendan Dolan 94.64	6

Second round (best of 21 legs); 19–20 July
1	Peter Wright 103.50	13
16	Krzysztof Ratajski 98.90	11
Rowby-John Rodriguez 96.10	6
9	Dimitri Van den Bergh 98.62	11
4	Michael van Gerwen 97.12	11
13	Joe Cullen 90.19	5
5	James Wade 94.55	9
Nathan Aspinall 97.28	11
2	Gerwyn Price 98.32	11
15	Dave Chisnall 93.91	8
7	José de Sousa 103.26	11
10	Rob Cross 103.98	8
3	Michael Smith 94.22	7
14	Dirk van Duijvenbode 98.00	11
Daryl Gurney 94.69	4
11	Danny Noppert 102.36	11

Quarter-finals (best of 31 legs); 21–22 July
1	Peter Wright 99.42	14
9	Dimitri Van den Bergh 102.01	16
4	Michael van Gerwen 101.86	16
Nathan Aspinall 96.03	14
2	Gerwyn Price 104.64	16
7	José de Sousa 97.98	14
14	Dirk van Duijvenbode 97.45	11
11	Danny Noppert 97.38	16

Semi-finals (best of 33 legs); 23 July
9	Dimitri Van den Bergh 95.32	14
4	Michael van Gerwen 98.90	17
2	Gerwyn Price 102.37	17
11	Danny Noppert 97.79	11

Final (best of 35 legs); 24 July
4	Michael van Gerwen 101.19	18
2	Gerwyn Price 96.92	14

== Top averages ==
The table lists all players who achieved an average of at least 100 in a match. In the case one player has multiple records, this is indicated by the number in brackets.

#	Player	Round	Average	Result
1	Gerwyn Price	Quarter-final	104.64	Won
2	Rob Cross	2nd Round	103.98	Lost
3	Dirk van Duijvenbode	1st Round	103.61	Won
4	Peter Wright	2nd Round	103.50	Won
5	José de Sousa	2nd Round	103.26	Won
6	Gerwyn Price (2)	Semi-final	102.37	Won
7	Danny Noppert	2nd Round	102.36	Won
8	Dimitri Van den Bergh	Quarter-final	102.01	Won
9	Michael van Gerwen	Quarter-final	101.86	Won
10	Michael van Gerwen (2)	Final	101.19	Won
11	Danny Noppert (2)	1st Round	100.70	Won
12	Ryan Searle	1st Round	100.06	Lost
13	Dimitri Van den Bergh (2)	1st Round	100.03	Won
