= 2024 Austrian Darts Open =

2024 NEO.bet Austrian Darts Open

Tournament information
- Dates: 26–28 April 2024
- Venue: Premstättner Halle
- Location: Graz, Austria
- Organisation(s): Professional Darts Corporation (PDC)
- Format: Legs
- Prize fund: £175,000
- Winner's share: £30,000
- High checkout: 170; Stephen Bunting (x2); Joe Cullen

Champion(s)
- Luke Littler (ENG)

The 2024 Austrian Darts Open, known as the 2024 NEO.bet Austrian Darts Open for sponsorship reasons, was a professional darts tournament that took place at the Premstättner Halle in Graz, Austria, from 26 to 28 April 2024. It was the fifth of thirteen European Tour events on the 2024 PDC Pro Tour. It featured a field of 48 players and £175,000 in prize money, with £30,000 going to the winner.

Jonny Clayton was the defending champion after defeating Josh Rock 8–6 in the 2023 final. Clayton was beaten 6–3 by Martin Schindler in the third round.

Luke Littler won his second European Tour title of 2024 after beating Joe Cullen 8–4 in the final.

== Prize money ==
The prize fund remained at £175,000, with £30,000 to the winner:

Stage (num. of players)		Prize money
Winner	(1)	£30,000
Runner-up	(1)	£12,000
Semi-finalists	(2)	£8,500
Quarter-finalists	(4)	£6,000
Third round losers	(8)	£4,000
Second round losers	(16)	£2,500*
First round losers	(16)	£1,250*
Total	£175,000	

- Pre-qualified players from the Orders of Merit who lose in their first match of the event shall not be credited with prize money on any Order of Merit. A player who qualifies as a qualifier, but later becomes a seed due to the withdrawal of one or more other players shall be credited with their prize money on all Orders of Merit regardless of how far they progress in the event.

== Qualification and format ==
A massive overhaul in the qualification for the 2024 European Tour events was announced on 7 January.

For the first time, both the PDC Order of Merit and the PDC Pro Tour Order of Merit rankings were used to determine 32 of the 48 entrants for the event. The top 16 on the PDC Order of Merit qualified, along with the highest 16 ranked players on the PDC ProTour Order of Merit (after the PDC Order of Merit players were removed). From those 32 players, the 16 highest ranked players on the PDC ProTour Order of Merit were seeded for the event. The seedings were confirmed on 4 April.

The remaining 16 places went to players from four qualifying events – 10 from the Tour Card Holder Qualifier (held on 10 April), four from the Host Nation Qualifier (to be held on 25 April), one from the Nordic & Baltic Associate Nation Qualifier (held on 5 April) and one from the East European Associate Member Qualifier (held on 6 April).

Luke Humphries and Gary Anderson withdrew and were replaced by Richard Veenstra and Ricky Evans. Krzysztof Ratajski and Joe Cullen moved up to become the 15th and 16th seeds respectively. After the draw was made, Gerwyn Price withdrew and was replaced by Daniel Klose, who went straight in at the second round.

The following players took part in the tournament:

Seeded Players

1. Dave Chisnall (third round)
2. Damon Heta (second round)
3. ~~Gerwyn Price~~ (withdrew)
4. Rob Cross (second round)
5. Jonny Clayton (third round)
6. Michael van Gerwen (quarter-finals)
7. Josh Rock (third round)
8. Dirk van Duijvenbode (second round)
9. Ryan Searle (second round)
10. Danny Noppert (quarter-finals)
11. Peter Wright (third round)
12. Ricardo Pietreczko (second round)
13. Stephen Bunting (semi-finals)
14. Ross Smith (semi-finals)
15. Krzysztof Ratajski (third round)
16. Joe Cullen (runner-up)

Order of Merit Qualifiers
- Dimitri Van den Bergh (second round)
- Chris Dobey (second round)
- Daryl Gurney (third round)
- Andrew Gilding (second round)
- Raymond van Barneveld (second round)
- Gian van Veen (quarter-finals)
- Martin Schindler (quarter-finals)
- Ryan Joyce (first round)
- José de Sousa (first round)
- James Wade (first round)
- Brendan Dolan (second round)
- Luke Littler (champion)
- Gabriel Clemens (first round)
- Mike De Decker (first round)

Tour Card Qualifier
- Danny Lauby (second round)
- Jeffrey de Zwaan (second round)
- Karel Sedláček (first round)
- Dom Taylor (second round)
- Wessel Nijman (second round)
- Martin Lukeman (first round)
- Arron Monk (first round)
- Graham Hall (first round)
- Madars Razma (first round)
- Ritchie Edhouse (third round)

Host Nation Qualifier
- Zoran Lerchbacher (first round)
- Dominik Haberl (first round)
- Hannes Schnier (first round)
- Christian Gödl (first round)

Nordic & Baltic Qualifier
- Darius Labanauskas (second round)

East European Qualifier
- Romeo Grbavac (first round)

Reserve List
- Richard Veenstra (second round)
- Ricky Evans (first round)
- Daniel Klose (third round)

== Draw ==
Numbers to the left of players' names show the seedings for the top 16 in the tournament. The three reserves are indicated by (Alt). The figures to the right of a player's name state their three-dart average in a match. Players in bold denote match winners.

**First round** (best of 11 legs); 26 April
**Brendan Dolan 98.32**	**6**
Hannes Schnier 93.43	3
**Darius Labanauskas 87.14**	**6**
Madars Razma 81.60	4
Arron Monk 87.99	4
**Ritchie Edhouse 93.45**	**6**
José de Sousa 74.95	1
**Gian van Veen 90.44**	**6**
Martin Lukeman 88.29	3
**Daryl Gurney 92.31**	**6**
**Alt**	**Richard Veenstra 97.24**	**6**
Alt	Ricky Evans 94.71	5
Graham Hall 92.83	2
**Chris Dobey 106.53**	**6**
**Martin Schindler 111.37**	**6**
James Wade 99.76	4
**Luke Littler 91.61**	**6**
Zoran Lerchbacher 83.10	2
**Dom Taylor 100.20**	**6**
Christian Gödl 86.93	0
**Dimitri Van den Bergh 93.50**	**6**
Gabriel Clemens 97.28	5
**Wessel Nijman 95.21**	**6**
Romeo Grbavac 86.06	5
**Andrew Gilding 81.02**	**6**
Dominik Haberl 74.56	2
**Raymond van Barneveld 89.46**	**6**
Mike De Decker 92.78	5
**Jeffrey de Zwaan 99.18**	**6**
Karel Sedláček 93.53	3
**Danny Lauby 93.53**	**6**
Ryan Joyce 85.59	4

**Second round** (best of 11 legs); 27 April
**1**	**Dave Chisnall 93.60**	**6**
Brendan Dolan 98.24	4
**16**	**Joe Cullen 102.02**	**6**
Darius Labanauskas 99.71	3
8	Dirk van Duijvenbode 98.80	2
**Ritchie Edhouse 103.60**	**6**
9	Ryan Searle 99.80	5
**Gian van Veen 98.05**	**6**
4	Rob Cross 97.53	4
**Daryl Gurney 100.53**	**6**
**13**	**Stephen Bunting 97.94**	**6**
Alt	Richard Veenstra 91.91	5
**5**	**Jonny Clayton 97.19**	**6**
Chris Dobey 87.76	1
12	Ricardo Pietreczko 87.64	0
**Martin Schindler 101.33**	**6**
2	Damon Heta 88.13	2
**Luke Littler 106.02**	**6**
**15**	**Krzysztof Ratajski 96.81**	**6**
Dom Taylor 91.02	2
**7**	**Josh Rock 102.73**	**6**
Dimitri Van den Bergh 96.55	5
**10**	**Danny Noppert 104.03**	**6**
Wessel Nijman 99.76	3
**Alt**	**Daniel Klose 88.28**	**6**
Andrew Gilding 87.26	2
**14**	**Ross Smith 105.96**	**6**
Raymond van Barneveld 103.99	5
**6**	**Michael van Gerwen 102.62**	**6**
Jeffrey de Zwaan 94.38	1
**11**	**Peter Wright 92.07**	**6**
Danny Lauby 86.42	5

**Third round** (best of 11 legs); 28 April
1	Chisnall 98.65	3
**16**	**Cullen 102.17**	**6**
Edhouse 98.93	4
**van Veen 105.20**	**6**
Gurney 100.40	3
**13**	**Bunting 104.64**	**6**
5	Clayton 87.57	3
**Schindler 91.73**	**6**
**Littler 95.07**	**6**
15	Ratajski 91.51	3
7	Rock 106.50	3
**10**	**Noppert 102.12**	**6**
Alt	Klose 93.28	2
**14**	**R.Smith 98.30**	**6**
**6**	**van Gerwen 93.92**	**6**
11	Wright 95.50	4

**Quarter-finals** (best of 11 legs); 28 April
**16**	**Cullen 104.49**	**6**
van Veen 103.37	3
**13**	**Bunting 93.82**	**6**
Schindler 91.99	5
**Littler 98.27**	**6**
10	Noppert 90.15	5
**14**	**R.Smith 97.14**	**6**
6	van Gerwen 90.61	1

**Semi-finals** (best of 13 legs); 28 April
**16**	**Cullen 98.53**	**7**
13	Bunting 96.26	5
**Littler 105.65**	**7**
14	R.Smith 95.78	2

**Final** (best of 15 legs); 28 April
16	Cullen 85.54	4
**Littler 102.71**	**8**
