= 2026 Swiss Darts Trophy =

Tournament information
- Dates: 9–11 October 2026
- Venue: St. Jakobshalle
- Location: Basel, Switzerland
- Organisation(s): Professional Darts Corporation (PDC)
- Format: Legs
- Prize fund: £230,000
- Winner's share: £35,000
- High checkout: 164 Gian van Veen

Champion(s)
- Jonny Clayton (WAL)

The 2026 Swiss Darts Trophy was a professional darts tournament that took place at the St. Jakobshalle in Basel, Switzerland, from 9 to 11 October 2026. It was the fourteenth of fifteen PDC European Tour events on the 2026 PDC Pro Tour. It featured a field of 48 players and £230,000 in prize money, with £35,000 going to the winner.

Stephen Bunting was the defending champion after defeating Luke Woodhouse 8–3 in the 2025 final. However, he lost 6–4 to Jeffrey de Graaf in the second round.

Jonny Clayton won his fourth European Tour title by defeating Luke Humphries 8–4 in the final.

== Prize money ==
As part of a mass boost in prize money for Professional Darts Corporation (PDC) events in 2026, the prize fund for all 2026 European Tour events rose to £230,000, of which the winner received £35,000.

Stage (num. of players)		Prize money
Winner	(1)	£35,000
Runner-up	(1)	£15,000
Semi-finalists	(2)	£10,000
Quarter-finalists	(4)	£8,000
Third round losers	(8)	£5,000
Second round losers	(16)	£3,500*
First round losers	(16)	£2,000*
Total	£230,000	

- Pre-qualified players from the Orders of Merit who lose in their first match of the event shall not be credited with prize money on any Order of Merit.

== Qualification and format ==
The top 16 players on the two-year PDC Order of Merit were seeded and entered the tournament in the second round, while the next 16 highest-ranked players from the one-year PDC Pro Tour Order of Merit automatically qualified for the first round. The seedings were confirmed on 23 July. The remaining 16 places went to players from four qualifying events – 10 from the Tour Card Holder Qualifier (held on 30 July), four from the Host Nation Qualifier (held on 8 October), one from the Nordic & Baltic Associate Member Qualifier (held on 7 August), and one from the East European Associate Member Qualifier (held on 8 August).

Before the Tour Card Holder Qualifier, Luke Littler withdrew and was replaced by Dave Chisnall, with Jermaine Wattimena becoming the 16th seed.

Gerwyn Price, Gary Anderson, Nathan Aspinall and Ryan Joyce withdrew and were replaced by Karel Sedláček, Alan Soutar, Rob Owen and Nick Kenny. Luke Woodhouse, Martin Schindler and Krzysztof Ratajski moved up to become the 14th, 15th and 16th seeds respectively.

Seeded players

1. Luke Humphries (ENG) (runner-up)
2. Gian van Veen (NED) (semi-finals)
3. Jonny Clayton (WAL) (champion)
4. James Wade (ENG) (second round)
5. Michael van Gerwen (NED) (second round)
6. Josh Rock (NIR) (third round)
7. Stephen Bunting (ENG) (second round)
8. Danny Noppert (NED) (second round)
9. Ryan Searle (ENG) (second round)
10. Chris Dobey (ENG) (second round)
11. Wessel Nijman (NED) (second round)
12. Ross Smith (ENG) (third round)
13. Jermaine Wattimena (NED) (second round)
14. Luke Woodhouse (ENG) (second round)
15. Martin Schindler (GER) (second round)
16. Krzysztof Ratajski (POL) (third round)

PDC Pro Tour Order of Merit qualifiers
- Kevin Doets (NED) (second round)
- Andrew Gilding (ENG) (first round)
- Rob Cross (ENG) (third round)
- William O'Connor (IRL) (second round)
- Niko Springer (GER) (second round)
- Niels Zonneveld (NED) (first round)
- Dirk van Duijvenbode (NED) (quarter-finals)
- Joe Cullen (ENG) (first round)
- Cameron Menzies (SCO) (first round)
- Damon Heta (AUS) (third round)
- Sebastian Białecki (POL) (first round)
- Dave Chisnall (ENG) (second round)

Tour Card qualifier
- Bradley Brooks (ENG) (quarter-finals)
- Mensur Suljović (AUT) (semi-finals)
- Tom Bissell (ENG) (third round)
- Jeffrey de Graaf (SWE) (third round)
- Michael Smith (ENG) (third round)
- Mario Vandenbogaerde (BEL) (first round)
- Raymond van Barneveld (NED) (first round)
- Sietse Lap (NED) (first round)
- Maik Kuivenhoven (NED) (second round)
- Cristo Reyes (ESP) (quarter-finals)
Host Nation qualifier
- Stefan Bellmont (SUI) (second round)
- Roman Wellinger (SUI) (first round)
- Bruno Stockli (SUI) (first round)
- Alex Fehlmann (SUI) (first round)
Nordic & Baltic qualifier
- Jani Haavisto (FIN) (first round)
East European qualifier
- György Jehirszki (HUN) (first round)
Reserve list
- Karel Sedláček (CZE) (quarter-finals)
- Alan Soutar (SCO) (first round)
- Rob Owen (WAL) (first round)
- Nick Kenny (WAL) (first round)

== Draw ==
The draw was announced on 8 October. Numbers to the left of a player's name show the seedings for the top 16 in the tournament. The figures to the right of a player's name state their three-dart average in a match. Players in bold denote match winners. The four reserve players are indicated by 'Alt'.

**First round** (best of 11 legs); 9 October
**Kevin Doets 94.89**	**6**
Alt	Nick Kenny 85.61	3
Andrew Gilding 82.54	3
**Stefan Bellmont 83.75**	**6**
**Damon Heta 95.05**	**6**
Alex Fehlmann 81.94	2
Cameron Menzies 93.93	4
**Cristo Reyes 98.03**	**6**
**Dirk van Duijvenbode 95.79**	**6**
Bruno Stöckli 98.10	3
**Michael Smith 90.94**	**6**
Alt	Robert Owen 86.02	4
**Mensur Suljović 87.18**	**6**
György Jehirszki 79.93	3
**William O'Connor 92.95**	**6**
Jani Haavisto 88.75	1
**Niko Springer 76.92**	**6**
(Switzerland) Roman Wellinger 71.46	1
Joe Cullen 84.70	5
**Tom Bissell 81.36**	**6**
**Jeffrey de Graaf 94.24**	**6**
Sietse Lap 91.96	4
Niels Zonneveld 100.17	4
**Bradley Brooks 100.73**	**6**
Raymond van Barneveld 87.40	3
**Maik Kuivenhoven 92.89**	**6**
**Rob Cross 105.95**	**6**
Mario Vandenbogaerde 100.81	3
**Dave Chisnall 82.52**	**6**
Alt	Alan Soutar 90.12	5
Sebastian Białecki 94.65	4
**Alt**	**Karel Sedláček 100.20**	**6**

**Second round** (best of 11 legs); 10 October
**1**	**Luke Humphries 102.85**	**6**
Kevin Doets 105.64	5
**16**	**Krzysztof Ratajski 89.70**	**6**
Stefan Bellmont 83.77	2
8	Danny Noppert 96.23	3
**Damon Heta 94.69**	**6**
9	Ryan Searle 92.51	4
**Cristo Reyes 89.37**	**6**
4	James Wade 99.72	5
**Dirk van Duijvenbode 93.36**	**6**
13	Jermaine Wattimena 93.68	4
**Michael Smith 102.65**	**6**
5	Michael van Gerwen 91.01	4
**Mensur Suljović 91.51**	**6**
**12**	**Ross Smith 100.68**	**6**
William O'Connor 103.93	4
**2**	**Gian van Veen 98.02**	**6**
Niko Springer 92.59	0
15	Martin Schindler 91.22	4
**Tom Bissell 95.77**	**6**
7	Stephen Bunting 91.67	4
**Jeffrey de Graaf 93.04**	**6**
10	Chris Dobey 83.68	4
**Bradley Brooks 85.25**	**6**
**3**	**Jonny Clayton 108.81**	**6**
Maik Kuivenhoven 94.33	1
14	Luke Woodhouse 97.36	4
**Rob Cross 97.81**	**6**
**6**	**Josh Rock 94.87**	**6**
Dave Chisnall 86.69	5
11	Wessel Nijman 97.71	4
**Alt**	**Karel Sedláček 91.48**	**6**

**Third round** (best of 11 legs); 11 October
**1**	**Humphries 114.15**	**6**
16	Ratajski 94.96	0
Heta 92.79	4
**Reyes 100.89**	**6**
**van Duijvenbode 88.37**	**6**
M Smith 91.01	3
**Suljović 93.87**	**6**
12	R Smith 95.08	5
**2**	**van Veen 100.97**	**6**
Bissell 91.77	4
de Graaf 80.66	3
**Brooks 92.05**	**6**
**3**	**Clayton 100.46**	**6**
Cross 106.68	4
6	Rock 82.67	2
**Alt**	**Sedláček 93.17**	**6**

**Quarter-finals** (best of 11 legs); 11 October
**1**	**Humphries 100.40**	**6**
Reyes 98.98	3
van Duijvenbode 88.00	1
**Suljović 102.03**	**6**
**2**	**van Veen 88.74**	**6**
Brooks 92.10	5
**3**	**Clayton 98.82**	**6**
Alt	Sedláček 95.82	2

**Semi-finals** (best of 13 legs); 11 October
**1**	**Humphries 111.17**	**7**
Suljović 100.55	4
2	van Veen 96.47	4
**3**	**Clayton 105.00**	**7**

**Final** (best of 15 legs); 11 October
1	Humphries 101.75	4
**3**	**Clayton 101.68**	**8**
