= 2024 Swiss Darts Trophy =

Tournament information
- Dates: 27–29 September 2024
- Venue: St. Jakobshalle
- Location: Basel, Switzerland
- Organisation(s): Professional Darts Corporation (PDC)
- Format: Legs
- Prize fund: £175,000
- Winner's share: £30,000
- High checkout: 167 Madars Razma

Champion(s)
- Martin Schindler

The 2024 Swiss Darts Trophy was the twelfth of thirteen PDC European Tour events on the 2024 PDC Pro Tour. The tournament took place at the St. Jakobshalle, Basel, Switzerland from 27 to 29 September 2024. It featured a field of 48 players and £175,000 in prize money, with £30,000 going to the winner.

This was the first edition of the event, marking the first European Tour event in Switzerland.

Martin Schindler won the title, his second European Tour trophy, after defeating Ryan Searle 8–7 in the final.

== Prize money ==
The prize fund remained at £175,000, with £30,000 to the winner:

Stage (num. of players)		Prize money
Winner	(1)	£30,000
Runner-up	(1)	£12,000
Semi-finalists	(2)	£8,500
Quarter-finalists	(4)	£6,000
Third round losers	(8)	£4,000
Second round losers	(16)	£2,500*
First round losers	(16)	£1,250*
Total	£175,000	

- Pre-qualified players from the Orders of Merit who lose in their first match of the event shall not be credited with prize money on any Order of Merit. A player who qualifies as a qualifier, but later becomes a seed due to the withdrawal of one or more other players shall be credited with their prize money on all Orders of Merit regardless of how far they progress in the event.

== Qualification and format ==
A massive overhaul in the qualification for the 2024 European Tour events was announced on 7 January.

For the first time, both the PDC Order of Merit and the PDC Pro Tour Order of Merit rankings were used to determine 32 of the 48 entrants for the event.

The top 16 on the PDC Order of Merit qualified, along with the highest 16 ranked players on the PDC ProTour Order of Merit (after the PDC Order of Merit players were removed). From those 32 players, the 16 highest ranked players on the PDC ProTour Order of Merit were seeded for the event.

The seedings were confirmed on 26 July.

The remaining 16 places went to players from four qualifying events – 10 from the Tour Card Holder Qualifier (held on 3 August), four from the Host Nation Qualifier (held on 26 September), one from the Nordic & Baltic Associate Member Qualifier (held on 26 July), and one from the East European Associate Member Qualifier (held on 2 June).

Ryan Joyce and Michael van Gerwen withdrew and were replaced by Ian White and Jim Williams. Daryl Gurney moved up to become a seed.

The following players took part in the tournament:

Seeded Players

1. Dave Chisnall (second round)
2. Ross Smith (third round)
3. Luke Humphries (quarter-finals)
4. Gerwyn Price (second round)
5. Danny Noppert (second round)
6. Josh Rock (semi-finals)
7. Stephen Bunting (third round)
8. Damon Heta (second round)
9. Ryan Searle (runner-up)
10. Martin Schindler (champion)
11. Rob Cross (third round)
12. Gian van Veen (second round)
13. Chris Dobey (second round)
14. Luke Littler (third round)
15. Ricardo Pietreczko (second round)
16. Daryl Gurney (quarter-finals)

Order of Merit Qualifiers
- Jonny Clayton (first round)
- Michael Smith (second round)
- Raymond van Barneveld (quarter-finals)
- Peter Wright (first round)
- Krzysztof Ratajski (first round)
- Ritchie Edhouse (first round)
- Brendan Dolan (first round)
- Luke Woodhouse (first round)
- James Wade (quarter-finals)
- Andrew Gilding (second round)
- Joe Cullen (first round)
- Callan Rydz (semi-finals)
- Dimitri Van den Bergh (first round)
- Nathan Aspinall (third round)

Tour Card Qualifier
- Mike De Decker (second round)
- Cameron Menzies (third round)
- Wessel Nijman (third round)
- Dirk van Duijvenbode (first round)
- Karel Sedláček (second round)
- Jermaine Wattimena (second round)
- Madars Razma (third round)
- Richard Veenstra (second round)
- Ryan Meikle (first round)
- Graham Hall (first round)

Host Nation Qualifier
- Roger Hertig (second round)
- Bruno Stöckli (second round)
- Marcel Walpen (first round)
- Alex Fehlmann (first round)

Nordic and Baltic Qualifier
- Anton Östlund (second round)

East European Qualifier
- Nándor Prés (first round)

Reserve List
- Jim Williams (first round)
- Ian White (first round)

== Draw ==
First round (best of 11 legs); 27 September
Marcel Walpen 79.01	3
Nathan Aspinall 91.61	6
Karel Sedláček 95.67	6
Alt	Jim Williams 92.58	4
Madars Razma 94.02	6
Alex Fehlmann 87.84	3
Roger Hertig 74.04	6
Ryan Meikle 74.63	5
Dimitri Van den Bergh 87.02	3
James Wade 95.41	6
Luke Woodhouse 74.34	0
Wessel Nijman 98.02	6
Cameron Menzies 90.98	6
Jonny Clayton 90.54	3
Callan Rydz 96.48	6
Brendan Dolan 91.89	1
Mike De Decker 88.78	6
Graham Hall 83.55	2
Joe Cullen 87.18	2
Raymond van Barneveld 102.47	6
Alt	Ian White 88.92	5
Michael Smith 92.96	6
Anton Östlund 95.50	6
Dirk van Duijvenbode 97.91	2
Peter Wright 93.44	4
Richard Veenstra 86.72	6
Krzysztof Ratajski 84.04	3
Bruno Stöckli 79.58	6
Ritchie Edhouse 87.62	4
Jermaine Wattimena 88.99	6
Andrew Gilding 86.71	6
Nándor Prés 71.47	0

Second round (best of 11 legs); 28 September
1	Dave Chisnall 91.10	3
Nathan Aspinall 100.89	6
16	Daryl Gurney 94.91	6
Karel Sedláček 89.24	2
8	Damon Heta 87.71	5
Madars Razma 88.66	6
9	Ryan Searle 86.04	6
Roger Hertig 71.21	1
4	Gerwyn Price 96.91	4
James Wade 98.79	6
13	Chris Dobey 94.60	5
Wessel Nijman 94.60	6
5	Danny Noppert 97.56	4
Cameron Menzies 96.64	6
12	Gian van Veen 95.59	4
Callan Rydz 88.18	6
2	Ross Smith 94.18	6
Mike De Decker 90.00	4
15	Ricardo Pietreczko 85.92	5
Raymond van Barneveld 89.02	6
7	Stephen Bunting 99.42	6
Michael Smith 98.39	5
10	Martin Schindler 96.36	6
Anton Östlund 85.04	1
3	Luke Humphries 100.70	6
Richard Veenstra 90.18	2
14	Luke Littler 93.51	6
Bruno Stöckli 83.07	3
6	Josh Rock 93.12	6
Jermaine Wattimena 91.80	4
11	Rob Cross 100.96	6
Andrew Gilding 94.97	2

Third round (best of 11 legs); 29 September
Aspinall 92.63	3
16	Gurney 99.14	6
Razma 85.54	2
9	Searle 91.52	6
Wade 96.06	6
Nijman 98.07	4
Menzies 92.22	5
Rydz 90.99	6
2	Smith 88.60	4
van Barneveld 93.27	6
7	Bunting 89.56	4
10	Schindler 95.72	6
3	Humphries 95.20	6
14	Littler 93.32	3
6	Rock 102.54	6
11	Cross 99.72	4

Quarter-finals (best of 11 legs); 29 September
16	Gurney 88.69	2
9	Searle 91.76	6
Wade 84.00	2
Rydz 94.03	6
van Barneveld 93.68	4
10	Schindler 95.03	6
3	Humphries 94.11	1
6	Rock 96.86	6

Semi-finals (best of 13 legs); 29 September
9	Searle 89.31	7
Rydz 85.90	1
10	Schindler 102.05	7
6	Rock 99.83	2

Final (best of 15 legs); 29 September
9	Searle 93.68	7
10	Schindler 93.03	8
