= 2022 German Darts Championship =

2022 edition of German Darts Championship

2022 Interwetten German Darts Championship

Tournament information
- Dates: 11–13 March 2022
- Venue: Halle 39
- Location: Hildesheim
- Country: Germany
- Organisation(s): PDC
- Format: Legs
- Prize fund: £140,000
- Winner's share: £25,000
- High checkout: 164 Daryl Gurney

Champion(s)
- Michael van Gerwen

The 2022 Interwetten German Darts Championship was the second of thirteen PDC European Tour events on the 2022 PDC Pro Tour. The tournament took place at Halle 39, Hildesheim from 11 to 13 March 2022. It featured a field of 48 players and £140,000 in prize money, with £25,000 going to the winner.

Devon Petersen was the defending champion after defeating Jonny Clayton 8–3 in the 2020 final, but lost to Michael Smith in the second round.

Michael van Gerwen won his 33rd European Tour title after beating Rob Cross 8–5 in the final, after surviving three match darts in his semi-final match against Dimitri Van den Bergh.

== Prize money ==
The prize money was unchanged from the European Tours of the last 3 years:

Stage (num. of players)		Prize money
Winner	(1)	£25,000
Runner-up	(1)	£10,000
Semi-finalists	(2)	£6,500
Quarter-finalists	(4)	£5,000
Third round losers	(8)	£3,000
Second round losers	(16)	£2,000*
First round losers	(16)	£1,000*
Total	£140,000	

- Seeded players who lose in the second round and host nation qualifiers (who qualify automatically as a result of their ranking) who lose in their first match of the event shall not be credited with prize money on any Order of Merit. A player who qualifies as a qualifier, but later becomes a seed due to the withdrawal of one or more other players shall be credited with their prize money on all Orders of Merit regardless of how far they progress in the event.

== Qualification and format ==
The top 16 entrants from the PDC ProTour Order of Merit on 1 February automatically qualified for the event and were seeded in the second round.

The remaining 32 places went to players from six qualifying events – 24 from the Tour Card Holder Qualifier (held on 11 February), two from the Associate Member Qualifier (held on 23 February), the two highest ProTour ranking German players, two from the Host Nation Qualifier (held on 24 February), one from the Nordic & Baltic Associate Member Qualifier (held on 28 January), and one from the East European Associate Member Qualifier (held on 5 March).

Seeds Gerwyn Price and Brendan Dolan withdrew after the qualifiers, so Gabriel Clemens and Chris Dobey were promoted into the seeded positions, while unseeded Ted Evetts also withdrew, resulting in a total of three first round byes.

Peter Wright withdrew from his quarter-final match with a back injury, so Michael van Gerwen received a bye to the semi-finals.

The following players took part in the tournament.

Top 16

1. José de Sousa (third round)
2. Michael Smith (quarter-finals)
3. Peter Wright (quarter-finals, withdrew)
4. Jonny Clayton (quarter-finals)
5. Joe Cullen (third round)
6. Michael van Gerwen (champion)
7. Ryan Searle (third round)
8. Rob Cross (runner-up)
9. Dirk van Duijvenbode (third round)
10. Dimitri Van den Bergh (semi-finals)
11. Damon Heta (second round)
12. Luke Humphries (second round)
13. Callan Rydz (second round)
14. Krzysztof Ratajski (third round)
15. Gabriel Clemens (second round)
16. Chris Dobey (second round)

Tour Card Qualifier
- Luc Peters (first round)
- Kim Huybrechts (second round)
- Jermaine Wattimena (first round)
- Joe Murnan (first round)
- Alan Soutar (second round)
- José Justicia (second round)
- Devon Petersen (second round)
- Daryl Gurney (semi-finals)
- Darius Labanauskas (second round)
- Dave Chisnall (third round)
- Martijn Kleermaker (second round)
- George Killington (first round)
- Nathan Rafferty (first round)
- Mensur Suljović (third round)
- Jimmy Hendriks (first round)
- Vincent van der Voort (second round)
- Jamie Hughes (second round)
- Martin Lukeman (third round)
- Mario Vandenbogaerde (first round)
- Adrian Lewis (first round)
- Scott Waites (second round)
- Ricky Evans (second round)

Associate Member Qualifier
- Gian van Veen (first round)
- Stefan Bellmont (first round)

Highest Ranked Germans
- Martin Schindler (second round)

Host Nation Qualifier
- Niko Springer (first round)
- Lukas Wenig (first round)

Nordic & Baltic Qualifier
- Marko Kantele (first round)

East European Qualifier
- Karel Sedláček (quarter-finals)

== Draw ==
First round (best of 11 legs); 11 March
Joe Murnan 90.74	3
Kim Huybrechts 86.86	6
Karel Sedláček 94.42	6
Adrian Lewis 88.61	2
Mario Vandenbogaerde 93.26	4
Martijn Kleermaker 86.31	6
Darius Labanauskas 92.47	6
Niko Springer 93.47	2
Marko Kantele 85.12	3
Scott Waites 87.83	6
Mensur Suljović	bye
Nathan Rafferty 99.41	3
Ricky Evans 96.74	6
Daryl Gurney 82.00	6
Lukas Wenig 85.93	3
Devon Petersen	bye
Dave Chisnall 99.11	6
Stefan Bellmont 80.06	1
Vincent van der Voort 93.80	6
Gian van Veen 86.23	2
Alan Soutar 89.76	6
Luc Peters 86.40	3
Martin Schindler 92.83	6
Jermaine Wattimena 97.78	5
Jamie Hughes	bye
José Justicia 89.96	6
George Killington 93.69	4
Martin Lukeman 92.11	6
Jimmy Hendriks 83.64	2

Second round (best of 11 legs); 12 March
1	José de Sousa 85.07	6
Kim Huybrechts 82.51	5
16	Chris Dobey 88.83	0
Karel Sedláček 95.94	6
8	Rob Cross 99.63	6
Martijn Kleermaker 87.26	2
9	Dirk van Duijvenbode 96.54	6
Darius Labanauskas 92.54	3
4	Jonny Clayton 94.02	6
Scott Waites 90.77	2
13	Callan Rydz 73.66	0
Mensur Suljović 90.18	6
5	Joe Cullen 102.00	6
Ricky Evans 96.80	3
12	Luke Humphries 93.47	4
Daryl Gurney 95.94	6
2	Michael Smith 92.94	6
Devon Petersen 86.64	4
15	Gabriel Clemens 91.09	5
Dave Chisnall 93.94	6
7	Ryan Searle 96.04	6
Vincent van der Voort 92.88	4
10	Dimitri Van den Bergh 95.28	6
Alan Soutar 94.21	4
3	Peter Wright 92.60	6
Martin Schindler 99.62	4
14	Krzysztof Ratajski 89.65	6
Jamie Hughes 91.48	3
6	Michael van Gerwen 104.15	6
José Justicia 91.10	3
11	Damon Heta 108.82	5
Martin Lukeman 104.11	6

Third round (best of 11 legs); 13 March
1	Sousa 97.25	4
Sedláček 96.29	6
8	Cross 99.30	6
9	van Duijvenbode 91.26	3
4	Clayton 97.99	6
Suljović 98.82	4
5	Cullen 95.90	3
Gurney 94.98	6
2	Smith 108.38	6
Chisnall 101.47	1
7	Searle 90.00	1
10	Van den Bergh 96.47	6
3	Wright 97.66	6
14	Ratajski 96.11	4
6	van Gerwen 95.13	6
Lukeman 87.32	4

Quarter-finals (best of 11 legs); 13 March
Sedláček 90.06	4
8	Cross 101.07	6
4	Clayton 99.91	5
Gurney 95.20	6
2	Smith 86.12	3
10	Van den Bergh 87.77	6
3	Wright	w/d
6	van Gerwen	w/o

Semi-finals (best of 13 legs); 13 March
8	Cross 100.01	7
Gurney 92.45	4
10	Van den Bergh 100.97	6
6	van Gerwen 101.26	7

Final (best of 15 legs); 13 March
8	Cross 101.53	5
6	van Gerwen 104.08	8
