= José de Sousa =

Portuguese darts player (born 1974)

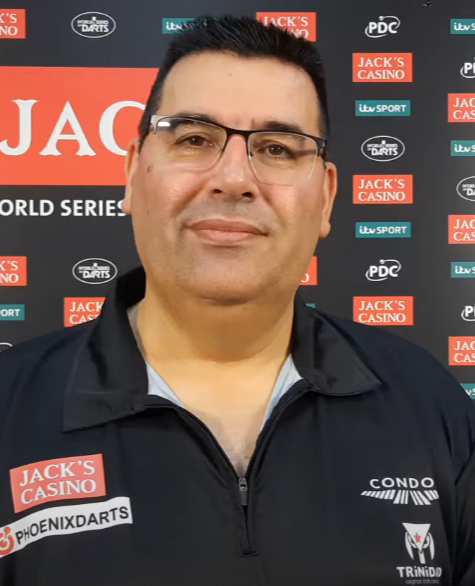
- De Sousa in 2021

Personal information
- Full name: José Augusto Oliveira de Sousa
- Nickname: "The Special One"
- Born: 12 February 1974 (age 52) Azambuja, Lisbon, Portugal
- Home town: Torrejón de Ardoz, Spain

Sport
- Sport: Darts
- Playing since: 1994
- Darts: 20g Trinidad Signature
- Laterality: Right-handed
- Walk-on music: "I Know You Want Me (Calle Ocho)" by Pitbull

Organisation (see split in darts)
- PDC: 2011– (Tour Card: 2019–2025)
- WDF: 2011

PDC premier events – best performances
- World Championship: Last 16: 2023
- World Matchplay: Quarter-final: 2022
- World Grand Prix: Last 16: 2021
- UK Open: Last 16: 2021
- Grand Slam: Winner (1): 2020
- European Championship: Quarter-final: 2021
- Premier League: Runner-up: 2021
- PC Finals: Quarter-final: 2021
- Masters: Semi-final: 2022
- World Series Finals: Last 16: 2021

Other tournament wins
- Years
Catalonia Championship	2009, 2012
Catalonia Open	2012
FCD Anniversary Open	2016
Spanish Federation Cup	2017
Vizcaya Open	2017
Bullshooter European Championship	2013
European Tour Events
European Darts Grand Prix	2020
Players Championships (x5)
2019 (x2), 2021 (x3)
Medal record
Men's Darts
Representing Portugal
EDF European Championship
Silver medal – second place	2013 Podčetrtek	Men's cricket
Silver medal – second place	2015 Santa Susanna	Men's singles
Bronze medal – third place	2022 Podčetrtek	Men's cricket

José Augusto Oliveira de Sousa (born 12 February 1974) is a Portuguese professional darts player who competes in Professional Darts Corporation (PDC) events, where he reached a peak ranking of world number six in 2022. A PDC Tour Card holder since 2019, he won his first PDC major title at the 2020 Grand Slam of Darts and competed in the 2021 Premier League, where he finished as runner-up. His best World Championship performance is reaching the last 16 at 2023 PDC World Championship.

De Sousa represented Spain at the 2011 WDF World Cup, but played for the Portuguese team afterwards at the PDC World Cup of Darts. He is known among darts fans for his maverick-like scoring, relatively frequent miscounts and unorthodox checkouts in matches.

== Career ==
De Sousa qualified for the 2012 PDC World Darts Championship by winning the Western European qualifier, beating Eduardo Lopes in the final. He became the first Portuguese player to qualify for either version of the World Darts Championship. He lost 4–3 in the preliminary round to South Africa's Devon Petersen. In the rest of the year, he won the Catalonia National Championship and the Catalan Open by beating Antonio Jimenez in the final. De Sousa claimed the 2013 Soft Tip Bullshooter European Championship with a win over Franck Guillermont. He reached the final of the 2015 Catalan Open, but lost 6–1 to Carles Arola.

De Sousa won the 2016 FCD Anniversary Open by overcoming Willem Mandigers 6–1 in the final. In 2017 on the second day of Q School he came close to winning a two-year PDC Tour Card, but lost 5–2 to Royden Lam in the final round.

=== 2019 ===
After a first round defeat at the 2019 PDC World Darts Championship to Michael Barnard, De Sousa attended the PDC's European Qualifying School in January 2019. He finished sixth on the EU Order of Merit, which secured him a two-year PDC Tour Card for the 2019 and 2020 seasons.

At the beginning of March, De Sousa made his debut at the UK Open, reaching the second round by defeating Brian Raman.

He made his maiden PDC final at Players Championship 18, but lost to James Wade 8–5. De Sousa then became the first Portuguese player to win a PDC title at Players Championship 23. He beat Gerwyn Price 8–1 in the final.

=== 2020 ===
At the 2020 PDC World Championship he lost 3–0 to Damon Heta in the first round.

In March, De Sousa lost to Lewy Williams 6–4 in the third round of the 2020 UK Open.

In October 2020, De Sousa won his first PDC European Tour title, beating Michael van Gerwen 8–4 in the final of the 2020 European Darts Grand Prix. Two weeks later in the 2020 European Championship, De Sousa managed to hit his first televised nine-darter, in a 6–3 win over Jeffrey de Zwaan. De Sousa represented Portugal at the 2020 PDC World Cup of Darts, partnering José Marquês. They defeated Hungary in the first round 5–0, but in the second round they lost to Austria.

De Sousa won his first major title at the 2020 Grand Slam of Darts. He defeated James Wade 16–12 in the final and became the first Portuguese winner of a major tournament. He was ranked in the world's top 16 for the first time after winning the event.

=== 2021 ===
De Sousa qualified for the 2021 PDC World Darts Championship as the fourteenth seed. He received a bye to the second round as a top-32-seeded player. He defeated Ross Smith 3–1, but lost to Mervyn King 4–0 in the third round. He finished the year in 15th place in the PDC Order of Merit and was named as one of the 10 competitors in the 2021 Premier League Darts, losing to Jonny Clayton 11–5 in the final.

De Sousa's defence of the Grand Slam title in November came to an abrupt end when he lost a deciding last-leg to eventual runner-up Peter Wright 10–9 in the last 16.

De Sousa won three Players Championship titles during the season, which contributed to him topping the Players Championship Order of Merit, making him the number one seed for the 2021 Players Championship Finals where he reached the quarter-finals, losing to Brendan Dolan 10–4.

=== 2022 ===
At the 2022 PDC World Darts Championship, De Sousa lost to Alan Soutar 4–3 in the third round.

At the end of January, at the 2022 PDC Masters, he reached the semi-finals of the event for the first time, after defeating Simon Whitlock 10–9 in a last-leg decider. De Sousa would eventually lose in the semi-finals 11–8 to the eventual winner Joe Cullen, who also bagged the last spot for the Premier League at the same time.

In mid-July, at the 2022 World Matchplay, he reached the quarter-finals of the event for the first time, after defeating Rob Cross 11–8 before losing to eventual runner-up Gerwyn Price 16–14.

=== 2023 ===
De Sousa achieved his best world championship result at the 2023 World Championship by reaching the fourth round. Starting in the second round, he came back from 2–0 down to defeat Simon Whitlock 3–2. He produced another comeback victory in the third round, beating Ryan Searle 4–3 despite a 3–0 deficit to set up a fourth-round tie against world number one Gerwyn Price. De Sousa suffered a 4–1 defeat to Price.

He reached a ranking final at Players Championship 10 but lost 8–3 to Dirk van Duijvenbode.

=== 2024 ===
De Sousa suffered a surprise early exit in the second round of the 2024 World Championship, losing 3–1 to qualifier Jeffrey de Graaf. In the opening round of the Belgian Darts Open, he faced 2024 World Championship runner-up Luke Littler in Littler's European Tour debut. De Sousa led 5–4 but missed two match darts, allowing Littler to win the match 6–5.

De Sousa failed to qualify for a ranked major event in the second half of 2024, although he did qualify for the World Series Finals through the Tour Card Holder Qualifier. He lost 6–5 to Michael Smith in the first round.

=== 2025 ===
For the first time since 2018, De Sousa failed to qualify for the 2025 PDC World Championship, having dropped outside the top 32 in the PDC Order of Merit ranking, and not progressing through the Tour Card Holder Qualifier.

=== 2026 ===
De Sousa qualified for the 2026 PDC World Championship, via the Tour Card Holder Qualifier this time around. He was eliminated in the first round to Ricardo Pietreczko 3–1.

The result meant he had to go to Q-School in January to try and retain his Tour Card for the 2026 season, after finishing 82nd on the PDC Order of Merit but was not successful.

After Q-School was completed, De Sousa turned his attentions to the PDC Challenge Tour.

== World Championship results ==
=== PDC ===
- 2012: Preliminary round (lost to Devon Petersen 3–4) (legs)
- 2019: First round (lost to Michael Barnard 2–3) (sets)
- 2020: First round (lost to Damon Heta 0–3)
- 2021: Third round (lost to Mervyn King 0–4)
- 2022: Third round (lost to Alan Soutar 3–4)
- 2023: Fourth round (lost to Gerwyn Price 1–4)
- 2024: Second round (lost to Jeffrey de Graaf 1–3)
- 2026: First round (lost to Ricardo Pietreczko 1–3)

== Career finals ==
=== PDC major finals: 2 (1 title) ===
Outcome	No.	Year	Championship	Opponent in the final	Score (Note: (l) = score in legs, (s) = score in sets.)
Winner	1.	2020	Grand Slam	James Wade	16–12 (l)
Runner-up	1.	2021	Premier League	Jonny Clayton	5–11 (l)

== Performance timeline ==
Tournament	2012	2019	2020	2021	2022	2023	2024	2025	2026
PDC Ranked televised events
World Championship	Prel.	1R	1R	3R	3R	4R	2R	DNQ	1R
World Masters (Note: A non ranked event until 2025)	NH	DNQ		1R	SF	2R	DNQ	Prel.	DNQ
UK Open	DNP	2R	3R	6R	5R	5R	4R	4R	DNQ
World Matchplay	DNP	DNQ	1R	2R	QF	1R	DNQ		
World Grand Prix	DNP	DNQ	1R	2R	1R	1R	DNQ		
European Championship	DNP	DNQ	2R	QF	2R	2R	DNQ		
Grand Slam	DNP	DNQ	W	2R	DNQ				
Players Championship Finals	DNP	2R	3R	QF	2R	1R	DNQ		
PDC Non-ranked televised events
Premier League	DNP			F	DNP				
World Cup	DNP		2R	2R	2R	RR	RR	RR	RR
World Series Finals	NH	DNQ		2R	DNQ	DNP	1R	DNQ	
Career statistics
Season-end ranking (PDC)	-	62	15	7	14	25	45	82	

PDC European Tour

Season	1	2	3	4	5	6	7	8	9	10	11	12	13
2019	Did not qualify							DDO; QF	DNQ				GDT; 2R
2020	BDC; DNQ	GDC; DNQ	EDG; W	IDO; 2R									
2021	HDT; SF	GDT; 3R											
2022	IDO; 2R	GDC; 3R	GDG; 2R	ADO; 2R	EDO; 3R	CDO; SF	EDG; 2R	DDC; 2R	EDM; 2R	HDT; QF	GDO; SF	BDO; QF	GDT; 3R
2023	BSD; DNQ	EDO; 1R	IDO; 3R	GDG; 3R	ADO; DNQ	DDC; DNQ	BDO; 2R	CDO; 2R	EDG; 2R	EDM; 1R	GDO; 3R	HDT; 2R	GDC; DNQ
2024	BDO; 1R	GDG; 1R	IDO; 2R	EDG; 1R	ADO; 1R	BSD; 1R	DDC; 1R	EDO; DNQ	GDC; 1R	Did not qualify			

PDC Players Championships

Season	1	2	3	4	5	6	7	8	9	10	11	12	13	14	15	16	17	18	19	20	21	22	23	24	25	26	27	28	29	30	31	32	33	34
2019	WIG; 1R	WIG; 1R	WIG; 4R	WIG; 1R	BAR; 2R	BAR; 2R	WIG; 2R	WIG; 3R	BAR; QF	BAR; 3R	BAR; 3R	BAR; 1R	BAR; DNP	BAR; DNP	BAR; 3R	BAR; SF	WIG; 4R	WIG; F	BAR; 1R	BAR; 1R	HIL; 1R	HIL; 1R	BAR; W	BAR; 2R	BAR; 2R	BAR; 3R	DUB; 3R	DUB; W	BAR; 4R	BAR; 1R				
2020	BAR; 1R	BAR; 4R	WIG; 2R	WIG; 2R	WIG; 2R	WIG; 2R	BAR; 1R	BAR; 2R	MIL; 2R	MIL; 1R	MIL; F	MIL; 4R	MIL; 4R	NIE; 4R	NIE; 3R	NIE; 4R	NIE; 3R	NIE; SF	COV; SF	COV; F	COV; 1R	COV; F	COV; 1R											
2021	BOL; 2R	BOL; 1R	BOL; 4R	BOL; 4R	MIL; 2R	MIL; 1R	MIL; QF	MIL; 4R	NIE; W	NIE; QF	NIE; 1R	NIE; 2R	MIL; 2R	MIL; W	MIL; W	MIL; 1R	COV; SF	COV; F	COV; 2R	COV; SF	BAR; 4R	BAR; 4R	BAR; 1R	BAR; 4R	BAR; 4R	BAR; 4R	BAR; 4R	BAR; QF	BAR; 4R	BAR; 3R				
2022	BAR; 4R	BAR; 3R	WIG; QF	WIG; 1R	BAR; 2R	BAR; 3R	NIE; QF	NIE; 2R	BAR; QF	BAR; SF	BAR; 4R	BAR; 4R	BAR; 2R	WIG; 2R	WIG; 2R	NIE; 1R	NIE; 2R	BAR; 2R	BAR; 1R	BAR; 1R	BAR; 2R	BAR; 3R	BAR; 1R	BAR; QF	BAR; DNP	BAR; 1R	BAR; QF	BAR; 2R	BAR; 1R	BAR; 3R				
2023	BAR; 1R	BAR; 1R	BAR; 2R	BAR; 2R	BAR; 3R	BAR; 3R	HIL; 1R	HIL; 1R	WIG; 3R	WIG; F	LEI; 1R	LEI; 3R	HIL; 2R	HIL; 4R	LEI; 2R	LEI; SF	HIL; 1R	HIL; 1R	BAR; 3R	BAR; 3R	BAR; 3R	BAR; 3R	BAR; 4R	BAR; 1R	BAR; 1R	BAR; QF	BAR; 1R	BAR; 1R	BAR; 1R	BAR; 3R				
2024	WIG; QF	WIG; 4R	LEI; 2R	LEI; 1R	HIL; 1R	HIL; 1R	LEI; 3R	LEI; 1R	HIL; 1R	HIL; 1R	HIL; 1R	HIL; 2R	MIL; 1R	MIL; 2R	MIL; 1R	MIL; 2R	MIL; 2R	MIL; 1R	MIL; 1R	WIG; 2R	WIG; 1R	MIL; 1R	MIL; 1R	WIG; 4R	WIG; 1R	WIG; 1R	WIG; 1R	WIG; QF	LEI; 1R	LEI; 1R				
2025	WIG; 1R	WIG; 2R	ROS; 3R	ROS; 1R	LEI; 1R	LEI; 1R	HIL; 1R	HIL; 2R	LEI; 2R	LEI; 1R	LEI; 1R	LEI; 3R	ROS; 2R	ROS; 1R	HIL; 1R	HIL; 1R	LEI; 2R	LEI; 2R	LEI; 1R	LEI; 2R	LEI; 2R	HIL; 1R	HIL; 1R	MIL; 3R	MIL; 1R	HIL; DNP	HIL; DNP	LEI; 1R	LEI; 1R	LEI; 1R	WIG; 3R	WIG; 1R	WIG; 1R	WIG; 2R

Performance Table Legend
W	Won the tournament	F	Finalist	SF	Semifinalist	QF	Quarterfinalist	#R; RR; Prel.	Lost in # round Round-robin; Preliminary round	DQ	Disqualified
DNQ	Did not qualify	DNP	Did not participate	WD	Withdrew	NH	Tournament not held	#R; RR; Prel.	Lost in # round Round-robin; Preliminary round	NYF	Not yet founded

== Nine-dart finishes ==
José de Sousa televised nine-dart finishes
Date	Opponent	Tournament	Method	ref
29 October 2020	(Netherlands) Jeffrey de Zwaan	European Championship	3 x T20; 2 x T20, T19; 2 x T20, D12	
8 April 2021	Nathan Aspinall	Premier League Darts	3 x T20; 3 x T20; T20, T19, D12	
