= Gabriel Clemens =

German darts player (born 1983)

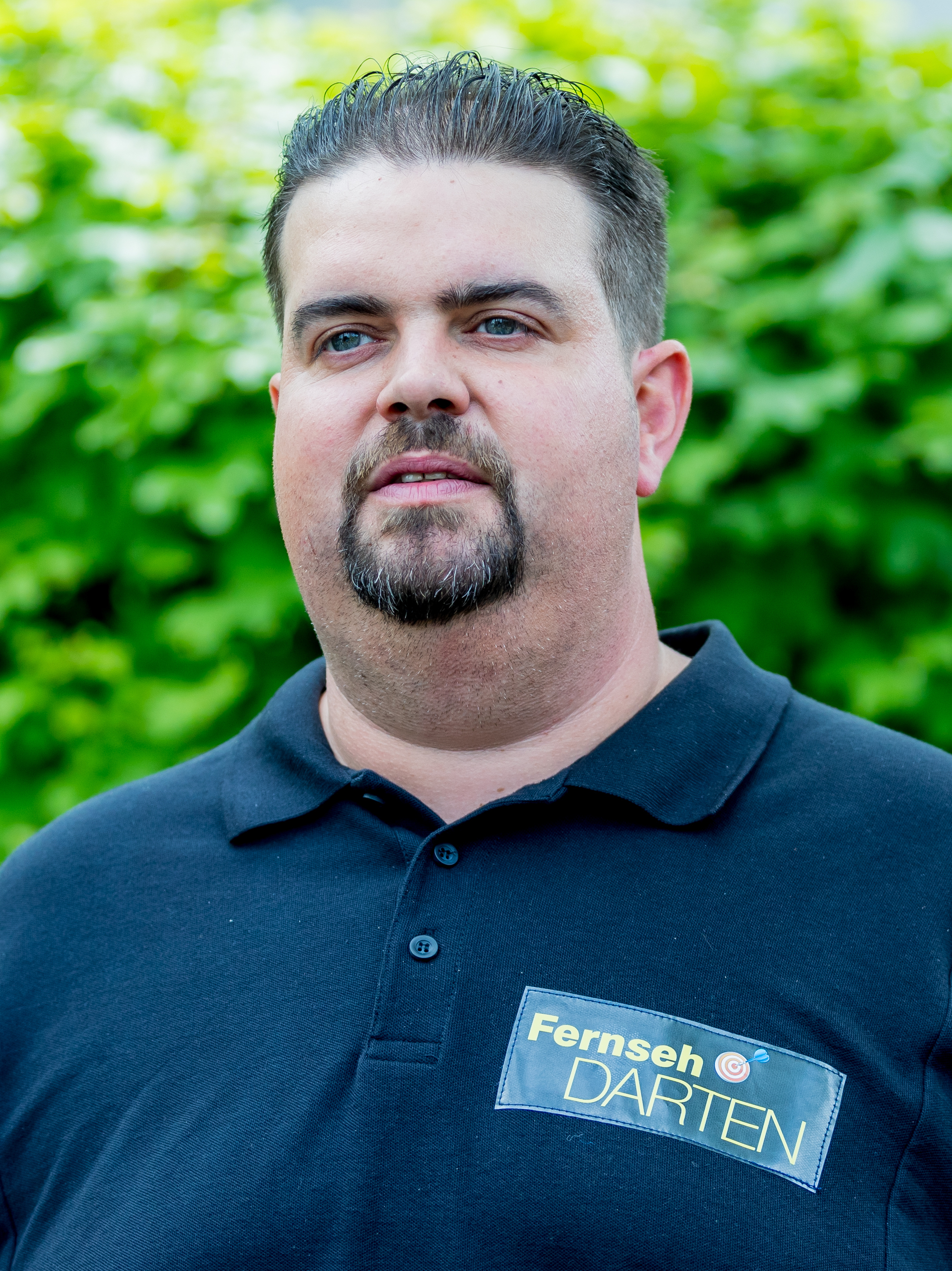
- Clemens in 2023

Personal information
- Nickname: "German Giant"
- Born: 16 August 1983 (age 43) Saarlouis, West Germany
- Home town: Saarwellingen, Germany

Sport
- Sport: Darts
- Playing since: 2002
- Darts: 23g Target Signature Gen 2
- Laterality: Right-handed
- Walk-on music: "Wonderwall" by Oasis

Organisation (see split in darts)
- BDO: 2008–2018
- PDC: 2018–present (Tour Card: 2018–present)
- Current world ranking: (PDC) 53 (5 November 2026)

WDF major events – best performances
- World Masters: Semi-final: 2017

PDC premier events – best performances
- World Championship: Semi-final: 2023
- World Matchplay: Last 16: 2020
- World Grand Prix: Last 16: 2020
- UK Open: Last 16: 2020, 2021
- Grand Slam: Last 16: 2019, 2026
- European Championship: Last 32: 2020, 2021, 2022, 2023, 2024
- PC Finals: Semi-final: 2023
- Masters: Last 24: 2022, 2023, 2024
- World Series Finals: Last 24: 2019, 2021, 2023

Other tournament wins
- Years
Players Championships
2026 Players Championship 24
Medal record
Men's Darts
Representing Germany
EDU European Ch'ship
Gold medal – first place	2017 Caorle	Men's cricket

Gabriel Clemens (born 16 August 1983) is a German professional darts player who competes in Professional Darts Corporation (PDC) events. He reached the semi-finals at the 2017 World Masters, the 2023 PDC World Championship and the 2023 Players Championship Finals. He won his first PDC ranking title at Players Championship 24 in July 2026.

== Career ==
=== 2017–2022: BDO, switch to PDC ===
In 2017, Clemens made the semi-finals of the World Masters, and missed match darts against the BDO number one Mark McGeeney to reach the final.

In January 2018, he gained a two-year PDC Tour Card. He won the fourth day of European Q-School by defeating the Dutchman Vincent Kamphuis 5–3 in the final. In his first year on the circuit, he reached the final of 2018 PDC Players Championship 11, where he took on two-time world champion Gary Anderson. Clemens missed two match-darts to win the title and lost 6–5.

In December 2020, he became the first German player to reach the last 16 in the PDC World Darts Championship, after beating reigning champion Peter Wright 4–3.

Clemens was eliminated from the 2022 World Championship in the third round, losing 4–0 to Jonny Clayton. He reached the final of Players Championship 18 in July 2022, where he succumbed to a whitewash defeat to Dirk van Duijvenbode. He reached successive European Tour quarter-finals at the end of the 2022, making the last eight of the Belgian Darts Open and the Gibraltar Darts Trophy.

=== 2023: World Championship semi-finalist ===
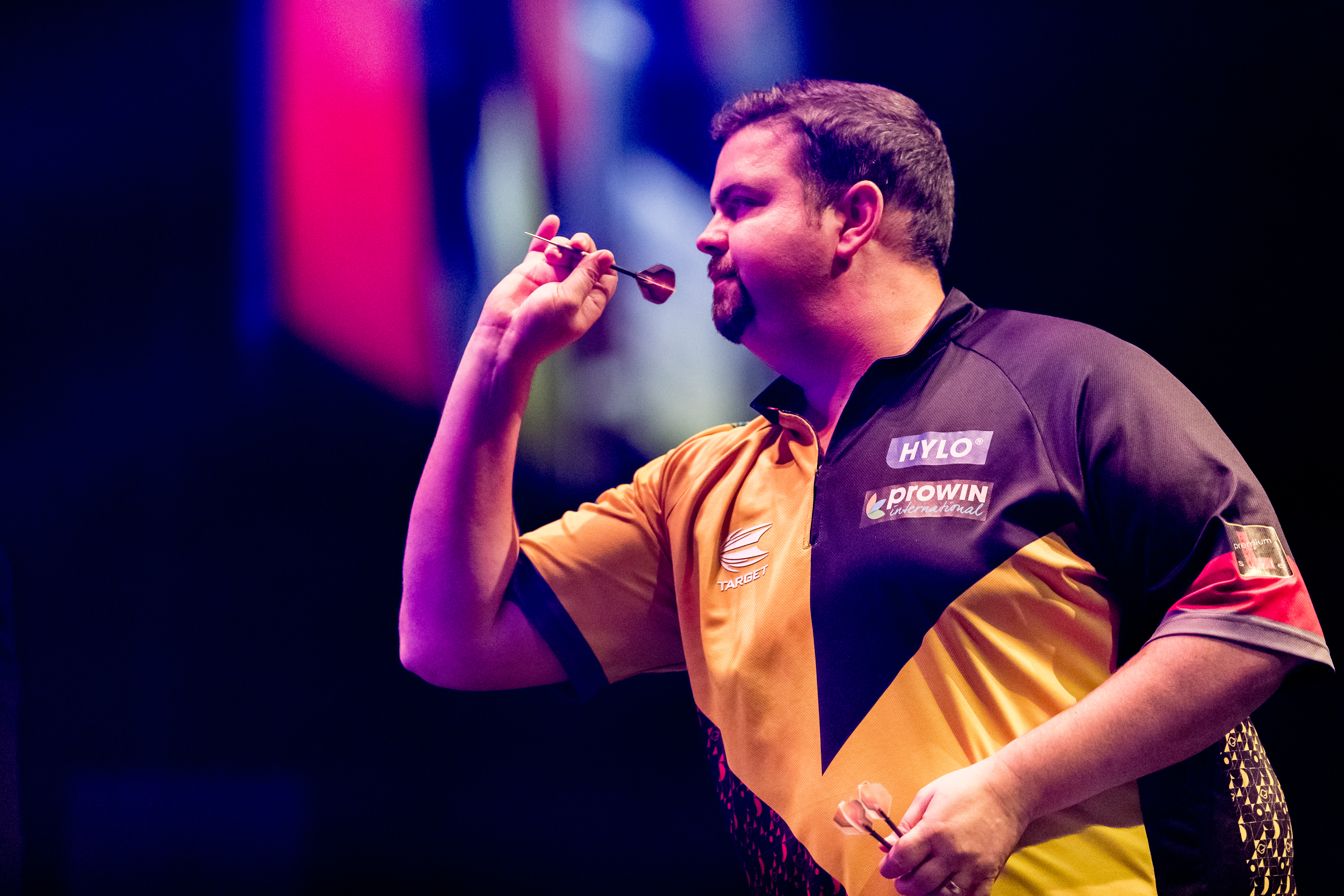
Clemens during the 1. Mannheim Darts Gala in 2022

Clemens reached the semi-finals of the 2023 World Championship following a 5–1 victory over then-world number one Gerwyn Price in the quarter-finals, becoming the first German player to reach that stage of the competition. He was unable to advance to the final as he suffered a 6–2 defeat to Michael Smith. He appeared in his seventh PDC final at Players Championship 3 the next month, where he lost 8–1 to Kim Huybrechts.

At the 2023 PDC World Cup of Darts, Clemens represented Germany alongside Martin Schindler. They reached the semi-finals, where they were defeated by Scotland. He then went on to make the semi-finals of the 2023 Players Championship Finals in November, where he lost 11–6 to Michael van Gerwen.

=== 2024–2025: Ranking fall ===
At the 2024 World Championship, Clemens defeated Man Lok Leung 3–1 before losing 4–1 to Dave Chisnall in the third round. He was defeated in his opening match at the 2025 World Championship, losing 3–1 to Robert Owen. He subsequently fell outside the top 32 in the PDC World Rankings, dropping ten places to world number 37. He reached his first ranking semi-final since November 2023 at Players Championship 16 in May 2025, where he was beaten 7–5 by Brendan Dolan. Clemens lost his place in Germany's World Cup of Darts team ahead of the 2025 edition, after being overtaken by Ricardo Pietreczko in the world rankings.

=== 2026: First PDC title ===
At the 2026 World Championship, Clemens achieved back-to-back 3–0 wins against Alex Spellman and Wessel Nijman. In the third round, he trailed Luke Humphries 3–0 but won the next two sets. He ultimately lost 4–2 after missing darts to level the match. Despite the defeat, he became the first German player to record a three-dart average over 100 in a PDC World Championship match. In July 2026, Clemens contested his eighth PDC final at Players Championship 24, where he defeated Luke Woodhouse 8–6 to win his first PDC ranking title, completing the victory with a 170 checkout.

== Personal life ==
In August 2024, Clemens married his partner Lisa in a ceremony on the island of Mallorca. He co-hosts the Darts auf die 1 podcast with fellow darts players Robert Marijanović and Marcel Althaus.

== World Championship results ==
=== PDC World Championship ===
- 2019: Second round (lost to John Henderson 2–3)
- 2020: First round (lost to Benito van de Pas 2–3)
- 2021: Fourth round (lost to Krzysztof Ratajski 3–4)
- 2022: Third round (lost to Jonny Clayton 0–4)
- 2023: Semi-finals (lost to Michael Smith 2–6)
- 2024: Third round (lost to Dave Chisnall 1–4)
- 2025: Second round (lost to Robert Owen 1–3)
- 2026: Third round (lost to Luke Humphries 2–4)

== Career finals ==
=== PDC World Series finals: 1 ===
Legend
World Series of Darts (0–1)

Outcome	No.	Year	Championship	Opponent in the final	Score
Runner-up	1.	2019	German Darts Masters	(Scotland) Peter Wright	6–8 (l)

== Performance timeline ==
=== BDO ===
Tournament	2009	2017
World Masters	2R	SF

=== PDC ===
Tournament	2018	2019	2020	2021	2022	2023	2024	2025	2026
PDC Ranked televised events
World Championship	DNQ	2R	1R	4R	3R	SF	3R	2R	3R
World Masters	DNQ				1R	1R	1R	Prel.	Prel.
UK Open	3R	5R	6R	6R	5R	4R	4R	3R	5R
World Matchplay	DNQ		2R	1R	1R	1R	DNQ		
World Grand Prix	DNQ		2R	1R	1R	1R	DNQ		
European Championship	DNQ		1R	1R	1R	1R	1R	DNQ	
Grand Slam	DNQ	2R	RR	RR	DNQ				2R
Players Championship Finals	3R	3R	2R	2R	1R	SF	1R	1R	
PDC Non-ranked televised events
World Cup	DNP		SF	QF	QF	SF	2R	DNQ	
World Series Finals	DNQ	1R	DNQ	1R	DNQ	1R	1R	1R	DNQ
Career statistics
Year-end ranking	63	39	31	25	19	22	37	47	

==== European Tour ====
Season	1	2	3	4	5	6	7	8	9	10	11	12	13	14	15
2016	Did not qualify								EDG; 1R	GDC; DNP					
2017	Did not qualify			EDG; 1R	Did not qualify										
2018	EDO; 2R	DNQ		ADO; 1R	EDG; 1R	Did not qualify						IDO; 1R	EDT; 2R		
2019	EDO; DNQ	GDC; 1R	GDG; 1R	GDO; 1R	Did not qualify			DDO; 2R	DNQ		EDM; 2R	DNQ			
2020	BDC; 2R	GDC; 2R	EDG; 2R	IDO; 2R											
2021	HDT; DNQ	GDT; 3R													
2022	IDO; 1R	GDC; 2R	GDG; 2R	ADO; 3R	EDO; 1R	CDO; 1R	EDG; 1R	DDC; DNQ	EDM; 3R	HDT; 1R	GDO; 1R	BDO; QF	GDT; QF		
2023	BSD; 1R	EDO; 1R	IDO; 2R	GDG; 2R	ADO; DNQ	DDC; 2R	BDO; 3R	CDO; DNQ	EDG; 2R	EDM; 2R	GDO; 1R	HDT; 1R	GDC; QF		
2024	BDO; 2R	GDG; 1R	IDO; 3R	EDG; QF	ADO; 1R	BSD; 1R	DDC; 1R	EDO; 1R	GDC; DNQ	FDT; 3R	HDT; 3R	SDT; DNQ	CDO; 2R		
2025	Did not qualify					EDG; 1R	Did not qualify							GDC; 2R	
2026	Did not qualify					ADO; 1R	Did not qualify						FDT; 2R	SDT; DNQ	DDC; DNQ

==== Players Championships ====
Season	1	2	3	4	5	6	7	8	9	10	11	12	13	14	15	16	17	18	19	20	21	22	23	24	25	26	27	28	29	30	31	32	33	34
2018	BAR; 1R	BAR; 2R	BAR; 3R	BAR; 3R	MIL; QF	MIL; 1R	BAR; 3R	BAR; 2R	WIG; 2R	WIG; SF	MIL; F	MIL; 3R	WIG; 3R	WIG; 1R	BAR; 3R	BAR; 1R	BAR; 3R	BAR; 1R	DUB; 1R	DUB; 1R	BAR; 3R	BAR; 4R												
2019	WIG; 2R	WIG; 1R	WIG; 1R	WIG; 1R	BAR; F	BAR; 3R	WIG; 1R	WIG; 1R	BAR; 3R	BAR; F	BAR; 2R	BAR; 1R	BAR; 1R	BAR; 4R	BAR; 1R	BAR; 1R	WIG; 3R	WIG; 4R	BAR; QF	BAR; 1R	HIL; 3R	HIL; 4R	BAR; 2R	BAR; 3R	BAR; 1R	BAR; 4R	DUB; 2R	DUB; 4R	BAR; 2R	BAR; 3R				
2020	BAR; 2R	BAR; SF	WIG; 2R	WIG; QF	WIG; QF	WIG; 2R	BAR; 1R	BAR; 1R	MIL; SF	MIL; 4R	MIL; 1R	MIL; 2R	MIL; 1R	NIE; 2R	NIE; 1R	NIE; 1R	NIE; 1R	NIE; 2R	COV; 3R	COV; QF	COV; 1R	COV; 1R	COV; 2R											
2021	BOL; QF	BOL; 2R	BOL; 3R	BOL; SF	MIL; 3R	MIL; 1R	MIL; SF	MIL; 3R	NIE; 4R	NIE; 2R	NIE; 2R	NIE; 1R	MIL; 1R	MIL; SF	MIL; 2R	MIL; 1R	COV; 3R	COV; 3R	COV; 3R	COV; 2R	BAR; 4R	BAR; 2R	BAR; 3R	BAR; 2R	BAR; F	BAR; 3R	BAR; 3R	BAR; QF	BAR; 2R	BAR; 1R				
2022	BAR; 1R	BAR; 3R	WIG; 1R	WIG; 2R	BAR; 2R	BAR; QF	NIE; 1R	NIE; 1R	BAR; 2R	BAR; 4R	BAR; 1R	BAR; 3R	BAR; SF	WIG; 3R	WIG; 1R	NIE; 4R	NIE; 1R	BAR; F	BAR; 1R	BAR; 2R	BAR; 2R	BAR; 3R	BAR; 3R	BAR; 1R	BAR; 1R	BAR; 1R	BAR; 1R	BAR; 4R	BAR; 1R	BAR; 2R				
2023	BAR; 1R	BAR; 4R	BAR; F	BAR; 2R	BAR; 1R	BAR; 2R	HIL; 3R	HIL; 2R	WIG; 2R	WIG; 3R	LEI; 2R	LEI; 3R	HIL; 3R	HIL; 1R	LEI; 3R	LEI; 2R	HIL; 2R	HIL; 3R	BAR; 2R	BAR; QF	BAR; 2R	BAR; 2R	BAR; 2R	BAR; 1R	BAR; 2R	BAR; 1R	BAR; 3R	BAR; 2R	BAR; 3R	BAR; 3R				
2024	WIG; 2R	WIG; 1R	LEI; 1R	LEI; 1R	HIL; 3R	HIL; 1R	LEI; 2R	LEI; 1R	HIL; 1R	HIL; 1R	HIL; 2R	HIL; 1R	MIL; 2R	MIL; 4R	MIL; 2R	MIL; QF	MIL; 1R	MIL; 3R	MIL; 4R	WIG; 3R	WIG; 3R	MIL; 4R	MIL; 1R	WIG; 1R	WIG; 3R	WIG; 2R	WIG; 1R	WIG; 3R	LEI; 3R	LEI; 2R				
2025	WIG; 1R	WIG; 1R	ROS; 1R	ROS; QF	LEI; 1R	LEI; 1R	HIL; 2R	HIL; 3R	LEI; 1R	LEI; 3R	LEI; 1R	LEI; 2R	ROS; 2R	ROS; 1R	HIL; 2R	HIL; SF	LEI; 1R	LEI; 2R	LEI; 3R	LEI; 1R	LEI; 2R	HIL; 4R	HIL; 3R	MIL; 1R	MIL; 3R	HIL; 1R	HIL; 1R	LEI; 1R	LEI; 2R	LEI; 3R	WIG; 1R	WIG; 1R	WIG; 2R	WIG; 2R
2026	HIL; QF	HIL; 4R	WIG; 1R	WIG; 2R	LEI; 2R	LEI; 1R	LEI; 1R	LEI; 2R	WIG; 1R	WIG; 4R	MIL; 2R	MIL; 1R	HIL; 1R	HIL; 2R	LEI; 1R	LEI; QF	LEI; 2R	LEI; 2R	MIL; 1R	MIL; 1R	WIG; 2R	WIG; QF	LEI; 2R	LEI; W	HIL; 1R	HIL; 2R	LEI; 2R	LEI; 1R	ROS; 2R	ROS; 2R	ROS; 1R	ROS; 2R	LEI; 2R	LEI; 1R

Performance Table Legend
W	Won the tournament	F	Finalist	SF	Semifinalist	QF	Quarterfinalist	#R; RR; L#	Lost in # round Round-robin; Last # stage	DQ	Disqualified
DNQ	Did not qualify	DNP	Did not participate	WD	Withdrew	NH	Tournament not held	#R; RR; L#	Lost in # round Round-robin; Last # stage	NYF	Not yet founded
