= 2022 Gibraltar Darts Trophy =

Ninth edition of Gibraltar Darts Trophy

Tournament information
- Dates: 14–16 October 2022
- Venue: Victoria Stadium
- Location: Gibraltar
- Organisation(s): PDC
- Format: Legs
- Prize fund: £140,000
- Winner's share: £25,000
- High checkout: 167 Damon Heta

Champion(s)
- Damon Heta

The 2022 Gibraltar Darts Trophy was the thirteenth of thirteen PDC European Tour events on the 2022 PDC Pro Tour. The tournament took place at Victoria Stadium, Gibraltar from 14 to 16 October 2022. It featured a field of 48 players and £140,000 in prize money, with £25,000 going to the winner.

Gerwyn Price was the defending champion after defeating Mensur Suljović 8–0 in the 2021 final, however he was defeated by 6–4 by Suljović in the second round.

Damon Heta won his first European title, defeating Peter Wright 8–7 in the final.

== Prize money ==
The prize money was unchanged from the European Tours of the last 3 years:

Stage (num. of players)		Prize money
Winner	(1)	£25,000
Runner-up	(1)	£10,000
Semi-finalists	(2)	£6,500
Quarter-finalists	(4)	£5,000
Third round losers	(8)	£3,000
Second round losers	(16)	£2,000*
First round losers	(16)	£1,000*
Total	£140,000	

- Seeded players who lose in the second round and host nation qualifiers (who qualify automatically as a result of their ranking) who lose in their first match of the event shall not be credited with prize money on any Order of Merit. A player who qualifies as a qualifier, but later becomes a seed due to the withdrawal of one or more other players shall be credited with their prize money on all Orders of Merit regardless of how far they progress in the event.

== Qualification and format ==
The top 16 entrants from the PDC Pro Tour Order of Merit on 28 July automatically qualified for the event and were seeded in the second round.

The remaining 32 places went to players from six qualifying events – 24 from the Tour Card Holder Qualifier (held on 2 August), two from the Associate Member Qualifier, as Gibraltar has no players on the Order of Merit, four places will come from the Host Nation Qualifier, one from the Nordic & Baltic Associate Member Qualifier, and one from the East European Associate Member Qualifier.

Two additional places were made available in the Host Nation Qualifier following the withdrawal of Tour Card Qualifier Krzysztof Kciuk and East European Qualifier Karel Sedláček. Gibraltarian qualifier Justin Hewitt withdrew after the draw through illness, giving his first round opponent Steve Beaton, a bye to the second round.

The following players took part in the tournament:

Top 16

1. Luke Humphries (quarter-finals)
2. Michael van Gerwen (semi-finals)
3. Gerwyn Price (second round)
4. Michael Smith (second round)
5. Rob Cross (semi-finals)
6. Damon Heta (champion)
7. Nathan Aspinall (quarter-finals)
8. Ryan Searle (third round)
9. Peter Wright (runner-up)
10. Dirk van Duijvenbode (third round)
11. Joe Cullen (third round)
12. Danny Noppert (second round)
13. Jonny Clayton (third round)
14. Dimitri Van den Bergh (second round)
15. José de Sousa (third round)
16. Dave Chisnall (second round)

Tour Card Qualifier
- Martin Schindler (first round)
- Steve Beaton (second round)
- Adam Hunt (first round)
- Rowby-John Rodriguez (second round)
- Ryan Joyce (third round)
- William O'Connor (second round)
- Daryl Gurney (first round)
- Mario Vandenbogaerde (first round)
- John Henderson (first round)
- Vincent van der Voort (first round)
- Gabriel Clemens (quarter-finals)
- Jason Lowe (second round)
- Jeff Smith (first round)
- Keane Barry (first round)
- Keegan Brown (first round)
- Mensur Suljović (third round)
- Stephen Bunting (second round)
- Josh Rock (quarter-finals)
- Ritchie Edhouse (second round)
- Rusty-Jake Rodriguez (second round)
- Ryan Meikle (first round)
- Chris Dobey (second round)
- Jim Williams (first round)

Associate Member Qualifier
- Kenny Neyens (second round)
- Wesley Plaisier (third round)

Host Nation Qualifier
- Sean Negrette (first round)
- Manuel Vilerio (first round)
- Dylan Duo Jr (first round)
- Dyson Parody (first round)
- Craig Galliano (second round)
- ~~Justin Hewitt~~ (withdrew)

Nordic & Baltic Qualifier
- Marko Kantele (first round)

== Draw ==
The draw was made on 13 October.

First round (best of 11 legs); 29 August
Sean Negrette 66.72	1
Kenny Neyens 76.01	6
Jeff Smith 91.87	0
Wesley Plaisier 92.97	6
Jim Williams 89.51	1
William O'Connor 97.14	6
Mario Vandenbogaerde 82.07	2
Craig Galliano 83.64	6
Ryan Meikle 84.55	4
Josh Rock 96.83	6
Stephen Bunting 105.31	6
Daryl Gurney 98.87	3
Marko Kantele 78.83	5
Rusty-Jake Rodriguez 83.20	6
Dyson Parody 80.78	4
Ryan Joyce 85.50	6
Steve Beaton	w/o
Justin Hewitt	w/d
Rowby-John Rodriguez 97.77	6
Keane Barry 89.67	3
Martin Schindler 91.11	3
Vincent van der Voort 91.43	6
Jason Lowe 80.20	6
Manuel Vilerio 69.93	2
Keegan Brown 91.86	0
Mensur Suljović 101.33	6
Gabriel Clemens 96.68	6
Adam Hunt 81.94	2
Chris Dobey 91.82	6
Dylan Duo Jr 66.32	1
Ritchie Edhouse 87.56	6
John Henderson 83.96	4

Second round (best of 11 legs); 30 August
1	Luke Humphries 99.49	6
Kenny Neyens 88.74	3
16	Dave Chisnall 100.87	3
Wesley Plaisier 96.09	6
8	Ryan Searle 98.65	6
William O'Connor 96.73	3
9	Peter Wright 96.92	6
Craig Galliano 82.25	2
4	Michael Smith 94.12	3
Josh Rock 94.07	6
13	Jonny Clayton 93.60	6
Stephen Bunting 89.02	2
5	Rob Cross 92.44	6
Rusty-Jake Rodriguez 85.20	3
12	Danny Noppert 93.32	5
Ryan Joyce 95.93	6
2	Michael van Gerwen 106.08	6
Steve Beaton 102.00	3
15	José de Sousa 92.39	6
Rowby-John Rodriguez 90.13	3
7	Nathan Aspinall 86.11	6
Vincent van der Voort 91.52	5
10	Dirk van Duijvenbode 94.19	6
Jason Lowe 90.18	5
3	Gerwyn Price 96.97	4
Mensur Suljović 97.66	6
14	Dimitri Van den Bergh 80.72	1
Gabriel Clemens 87.18	6
6	Damon Heta 87.45	6
Chris Dobey 91.76	4
11	Joe Cullen 92.96	6
Ritchie Edhouse 89.10	4

Third round (best of 11 legs); 31 August
1	Humphries 101.50	6
Plaisier 95.42	3
8	Searle 103.52	1
9	Wright 108.03	6
Rock 98.69	6
13	Clayton 97.98	5
5	Cross 104.85	6
Joyce 102.73	4
2	van Gerwen 96.67	6
15	de Sousa 87.71	4
7	Aspinall 94.79	6
10	van Duijvenbode 93.00	5
Suljović 83.12	1
Clemens 90.57	6
6	Heta 92.97	6
11	Cullen 89.64	1

Quarter-finals (best of 11 legs); 31 August
1	Humphries 95.01	3
9	Wright 105.07	6
Rock 101.61	5
5	Cross 98.52	6
2	van Gerwen 99.47	6
7	Aspinall 103.73	4
Clemens 92.92	4
6	Heta 93.72	6

Semi-finals (best of 13 legs); 31 August
9	Wright 108.66	7
5	Cross 96.32	1
2	van Gerwen 102.83	6
6	Heta 102.10	7

Final (best of 15 legs); 31 August
9	Wright 92.37	7
6	Heta 92.15	8
