= Devon Petersen =

South African darts player

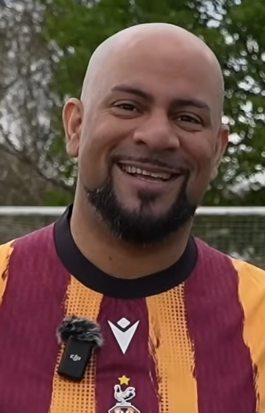
- Petersen in 2025

Personal information
- Nickname: "The African Warrior"
- Born: 4 June 1986 (age 40) Mitchells Plain, Cape Town, South Africa
- Home town: Bradford, England

Sport
- Sport: Darts
- Playing since: 2004
- Darts: 22g Shot Signature
- Laterality: Right-handed
- Walk-on music: "Waka Waka (This Time for Africa)" by Shakira ft. Freshlyground

Organisation (see split in darts)
- PDC: 2009–present (Tour Card: 2011–2012, 2015–2023)

WDF major events – best performances
- World Masters: Preliminary Round: 2010

PDC premier events – best performances
- World Championship: Last 16: 2014, 2019, 2021
- World Matchplay: Last 32: 2021
- World Grand Prix: Last 16: 2020
- UK Open: Quarter Final: 2015, 2021
- Grand Slam: Last 16: 2020
- European Championship: Semi Final: 2020
- PC Finals: Last 64: 2016, 2019, 2020, 2021
- Masters: Last 24: 2022
- World Series Finals: Last 24: 2015, 2022

Other tournament wins
- Years
Darts At Home Week 1	2020
South African Masters	2011
ADC Global Championship	2024
European Tour Events
German Darts Championship	2020

Devon Petersen (born 4 June 1986) is a South African professional darts player who competes in Professional Darts Corporation (PDC) events. He won his first PDC European Tour title at the 2020 German Darts Championship. He reached his first major semi-final at the 2020 European Championship. Petersen won the first Amateur Darts Circuit (ADC) Global Championship in 2024.

His best PDC World Championship performance is reaching the last 16 on three occasions.

He has also worked as a pundit for Sky Sports.

== Career ==
He qualified for the 2011 PDC World Darts Championship as the South African champion. He beat Guyana's Norman Madhoo 4–3 in the preliminary round with big checkouts including a 136 and a 146. In beating Madhoo, he earned a place in the first round proper, where he would play Jamie Caven. Despite winning the first set, Petersen lost by 3 sets to 1.

He qualified for the 2011 PDC Pro Tour as one of four semi-finalists from the second day of the Pro Tour's Q School. Since turning professional, Petersen has left South Africa to live in Brighouse, West Yorkshire, and signed a sponsorship deal with leading darts manufacturer Unicorn.

Petersen retained the South African Open in 2011 to qualify for the 2012 PDC World Darts Championship, where he edged out José Oliveira de Sousa 4–3 (legs) in the preliminary round to reach the last 64 for the second successive year. Petersen played Steve Brown in the first round and recovered from 2–1 down in sets to win 3–2, also recovering from 2–0 down in legs in the deciding set and surviving one match dart. Petersen said after the win that it was a "dream come true" and that he was sure he had more in him. He played Gary Anderson in the second round and played the best he has in front of the television cameras. However, the class of his opponent came through and he lost 4–2, with Anderson stating after the match that "Devon became very tough for me". Petersen himself said that he would "work hard and come back a better player".

He represented South Africa with Shawn Hogan in the 2012 PDC World Cup of Darts and together they defeated Spain 5–2 in the first round before causing a shock by knocking out number 4 seeds Scotland in the second round in a sudden death leg. They played Wales in the quarter finals and were beaten in the deciding doubles match. Petersen prematurely celebrated as he thought he had taken his country to the semi-finals by hitting double 16. However, he had miscounted and they were out of the tournament moments later when Richie Burnett secured the winning double. Petersen reached the last 64 of the 2012 UK Open by defeating Andrew Gilding 4–0, but then lost to Ronnie Baxter 9–6. In June, he qualified for the European Tour Event 3 after defeating Darren Webster and Gareth Cousins in the UK qualifier. Petersen again lost to Baxter this time 6–2 in the first round in Düsseldorf.

Petersen took a year away from darts in 2013 to recuperate from an arm injury. In September he won the South African Masters by defeating Graham Filby 9–3 in the final and in doing so earned a place in his third World Championship for the 2014 edition, where he saw off Mohd Latif Sapup 4–1 in the preliminary round. Petersen danced onto the stage for his first round match against Steve Beaton which immediately got the crowd on his side as he defeated the 1996 BDO world champion 3–1 in sets. Petersen was 2–1 ahead against Justin Pipe in the next round and in the deciding leg of the fourth set he took out a crucial 130 finish with Pipe on 36, before wrapping up a 4–1 win. In the third round his run came to an end when he lost 4–0 to James Wade. Petersen partnered Filby in the World Cup of Darts and they came past Germany 5–3 in the first round, before Petersen beat Paul Lim 4–0 in his singles match in the second round. Filby lost his to Harith Lim, meaning a doubles match was needed to settle the tie which South Africa edged 4–3. In the quarter-finals they faced the number one seeds of Phil Taylor and Adrian Lewis, with Petersen and Filby both losing their singles matches to exit the tournament. Petersen was defeated in the final of the South African Qualifier for the 2015 World Championship 9–5 by Nolan Arendse.

In January 2015, Petersen played in Q School and earned a two-year tour card on the second day by defeating Chris Hartrey 5–1 in the final round. Petersen did not base himself in Britain for 2015 and estimated he would make 20 trips back and forth from South Africa during the year. He entered the UK Open in the second round stage and beat Mark Cox 5–4, Mark Barilli 9–8, Jamie Caven 9–6 and Eddie Dootson 9–3 to reach the quarter-finals of a major PDC event for the first time. Petersen led world number one Michael van Gerwen 3–2 at the first break but had had darts to win every leg and went on to lose 10–5. He became the first South African to throw a nine-dart finish on the PDC tour at the sixth Players Championship and went on to reach the quarter-finals where Van Gerwen whitewashed him 6–0. At the World Cup, Petersen and Filby survived a match dart from Finland to win 5–4 before losing both of their singles matches against Van Gerwen and Raymond van Barneveld of the Netherlands in the second round. Petersen was invited to participate in the first World Series of Darts Finals, where he was eliminated 6–3 by Robert Thornton in the first round.

Petersen saw off Ricky Evans 6–5 and Kim Huybrechts 6–2 at the 2016 Dutch Darts Masters and then lost 6–2 to Mervyn King in the third round. He qualified for six other European Tour events and, even though he didn't reach the third round again, he had done enough to make his debut in the European Championship, but was defeated 6–4 by King in the opening round. Petersen and Graham Filby missed 14 darts at doubles as they were beaten 5–1 by Singapore in the first round of the World Cup. Petersen lost in the first round of the European Championship (6–4 to Mervyn King) and the Players Championship Finals (6–3 to Robbie Green).

Petersen struggled in the first round of the 2017 World Championship as he could only average 79.29 in a 3–1 defeat to Steve Beaton.

Petersen returned to form in the 2019 World Championship reaching the Last 16 his best run since 2014 beating Wayne Jones, Ian White, and Steve West before narrowly losing to Nathan Aspinall.

Again he qualified via the PDC World Africa Qualifying Event for the 2020 World Championship. He played Luke Humphries in the first round and lost 1–3. Petersen remained in the top 64 of the PDC Order of Merit and kept his tour card for 2020.

On 22 February 2020, Petersen reached his first ever PDC semi-final, at Players Championship 5, beating high quality players such as Stephen Bunting and Rob Cross (the World Number Four at the time) along the way, before losing to eventual winner Peter Wright 7–5.

On 27 September 2020, Petersen won his first ranking title beating Johnny Clayton 8–3 at the German Darts Championship. He followed this by a Second Round loss to Gerwyn Price in the 2020 European Darts Grand Prix, hence finished 4th with £27,000 on the European Tour order of merit, which cemented his place as a top seed in the 2020 PDc European Championship. In this tournament, Petersen eliminated Andy Hamilton, Martin Kleermaker and Ian White to reach his first major televised Semi Final, but lost narrowly 10–11 to James Wade. This run equaled a cheque of £32,000.

Further televised exposure followed in the 2020 PDC World Cup of Darts, where he was partnered by Carl Gabriel in a 5-1 First Round humiliation to Poland with Krzysztof Ratajski & Krzysztof Kciuk.

Despite some inconsistency in form at the 2020 PDC Winter Series, Petersen showed rejuvenation in the 2020 PDC Grand Slam of Darts, where he reached the Last 16 on his debut. In the course of doing so, he won all three of his group stage games against Ian White, Dirk van Duijvenbode and Peter Wright, topping the group and receiving the group winner's bonus of £3,500. Australian rising star Damon Heta proved too big of an obstacle and denied Petersen a place in his third major televised Quarter Final in a 10–7 victory over the South African.

Petersen entered the Top 32 in the world before the commencement of the 2020 PDC Players Championship Finals, but lost 3–6 to Luke Humphries, averaging 101.46 against Humphries' 99.65.

Petersen returned to the Alexandra Palace in London for the 2021 PDC World Darts Championship and started as a seeded player in Round 2 (Last 64) for the first time in his career. He overcame Steve Lennon and Jason Lowe to reach the fourth round, where he lost 4–0 to Gary Anderson.

In 2023, Petersen once again represented South Africa on the World Cup of Darts, forming a team with Vernon Bouwers. They made it to the second round, where they lost to the French team of Thibault Tricole and Jacques Labre.

== Darts used ==
Petersen previously used darts given to him by Phil Taylor at the 2009 South African Masters.

== World Championship results ==
=== PDC ===
- 2011: First round (lost to Jamie Caven 1–3)
- 2012: Second round (lost to Gary Anderson 2–4)
- 2014: Third round (lost to James Wade 0–4)
- 2017: First round (lost to Steve Beaton 1–3)
- 2018: First round (lost to Darren Webster 2–3)
- 2019: Fourth round (lost to Nathan Aspinall 3–4)
- 2020: First round (lost to Luke Humphries 1–3)
- 2021: Fourth round (lost to Gary Anderson 0–4)
- 2022: Second round (lost to Raymond Smith 0–3)

== Performance timeline ==
PDC

Tournament	2010	2011	2012	2013	2014	2015	2016	2017	2018	2019	2020	2021	2022	2023	2024	2025	2026
World Championship	DNQ	1R	2R	DNQ	3R	DNQ		1R	1R	4R	1R	4R	2R	DNQ			
UK Open	DNP	2R	3R	DNQ		QF	DNQ	2R	DNQ	3R	3R	QF	5R	3R	DNQ		
World Matchplay	Did not qualify											1R	DNQ				
World Grand Prix	Did not qualify										2R	Did not qualify					
European Championship	DNP	Did not qualify					1R	Did not qualify			SF	Did not qualify					
Grand Slam	Did not qualify										2R	Did not qualify					
Players Championship Finals	DNP	Did not qualify					1R	DNQ		1R	1R	1R	DNQ				
Non-ranked televised events
PDC Masters	NH			DNQ									1R	DNQ			
PDC World Cup	DNP	NH	QF	DNP	QF	2R	1R	2R	2R	2R	1R	2R	1R	2R	DNP	2R	RR
World Series Finals	Not held					1R	Did not qualify						1R	DNQ			
Career statistics
Year-end ranking	95	61	63	62	77	60	50	51	60	60	29	26	58	110			

PDC European Tour

Season	1	2	3	4	5	6	7	8	9	10	11	12	13
2012	DNQ		EDO; 1R	DNQ									
2015	GDC; 1R	GDT; 2R	DNQ			EDO; 3R	DNP		EDG; 1R				
2016	DDM; 3R	GDM; 2R	GDT; DNQ	EDM; 1R	ADO; DNQ	EDO; 2R	IDO; 2R	EDT; 2R	EDG; 1R	GDC; DNQ			
2017	Did not qualify							EDO; 3R	Did not qualify				
2019	Did not qualify				ADO; 1R	Did not qualify			CDO; 1R	Did not qualify			
2020	BDC; DNQ	GDC; W	EDG; 2R	IDO; DNQ									
2021	HDT; 2R	GDT; 2R											
2022	IDO; 2R	GDC; 2R	GDG; DNQ	ADO; 1R	EDO; 2R	Did not qualify							

PDC Players Championships

Season	1	2	3	4	5	6	7	8	9	10	11	12	13	14	15	16	17	18	19	20	21	22	23	24	25	26	27	28	29	30
2019	WIG; 1R	WIG; 3R	WIG; 1R	WIG; 1R	BAR; 3R	BAR; 1R	WIG; 2R	WIG; 1R	BAR; 2R	BAR; 1R	BAR; 1R	BAR; 1R	BAR; 2R	BAR; 1R	BAR; 3R	BAR; 2R	WIG; 2R	WIG; 1R	BAR; 3R	BAR; QF	HIL; 2R	HIL; 2R	BAR; 1R	BAR; 4R	BAR; 1R	BAR; 2R	DUB; 1R	DUB; 1R	BAR; 4R	BAR; 2R
2020	BAR; 1R	BAR; 1R	WIG; 1R	WIG; 1R	WIG; SF	WIG; 4R	BAR; 2R	BAR; 1R	MIL; 2R	MIL; 2R	MIL; 3R	MIL; 3R	MIL; SF	NIE; SF	NIE; 2R	NIE; 1R	NIE; F	NIE; 2R	COV; 2R	COV; 1R	COV; 1R	COV; 2R	COV; 3R							
2021	BOL; 3R	BOL; 1R	BOL; 4R	BOL; 3R	MIL; 4R	MIL; 3R	MIL; 1R	MIL; 2R	NIE; 1R	NIE; 1R	NIE; 3R	NIE; 1R	MIL; 1R	MIL; 1R	MIL; 1R	MIL; 1R	COV; 2R	COV; 3R	COV; 2R	COV; 2R	BAR; 3R	BAR; 1R	BAR; 1R	BAR; 1R	BAR; 1R	BAR; 2R	BAR; 1R	BAR; 1R	BAR; 1R	BAR; 1R
2022	BAR; 1R	BAR; 1R	WIG; 1R	WIG; 1R	BAR; 1R	BAR; 2R	NIE; 1R	NIE; 1R	BAR; 2R	BAR; 2R	BAR; 2R	BAR; 1R	BAR; 2R	WIG; 2R	WIG; 1R	NIE; 1R	NIE; 1R	BAR; 2R	BAR; 2R	BAR; 1R	BAR; 2R	BAR; 2R	BAR; 1R	BAR; 1R	BAR; 1R	BAR; 1R	BAR; 1R	BAR; 1R	BAR; 3R	BAR; 1R

Performance Table Legend
W	Won the tournament	F	Finalist	SF	Semifinalist	QF	Quarterfinalist	#R; RR; L#	Lost in # round Round-robin; Last # stage	DQ	Disqualified
DNQ	Did not qualify	DNP	Did not participate	WD	Withdrew	NH	Tournament not held	#R; RR; L#	Lost in # round Round-robin; Last # stage	NYF	Not yet founded
