= 2021 Gibraltar Darts Trophy =

Eighth edition of Gibraltar Darts Trophy

Tournament information
- Dates: 24–26 September 2021
- Venue: Europa Sports Park
- Location: Gibraltar
- Organisation(s): Professional Darts Corporation (PDC)
- Format: Legs
- Prize fund: £140,000
- Winner's share: £25,000
- High checkout: 170 Callan Rydz

Champion(s)
- Gerwyn Price

The 2021 Gibraltar Darts Trophy was the second PDC European Tour event on the 2021 PDC Pro Tour. The tournament took place at Europa Sports Park, Gibraltar from 24 to 26 September 2021. It featured a field of 48 players and £140,000 in prize money, with £25,000 going to the winner.

Krzysztof Ratajski was the defending champion after defeating Dave Chisnall 8–2 in the 2019 final, with the 2020 edition being cancelled due to the COVID-19 pandemic. He lost in the quarter-finals to Mensur Suljović.

Gerwyn Price won his fifth European Tour title, the second in a row after his Hungarian Darts Trophy win, defeating Suljović 8–0 in the final.

== Prize money ==
The prize money was unchanged from the 2019 & 2020 European Tours:

Stage (num. of players)		Prize money
Winner	(1)	£25,000
Runner-up	(1)	£10,000
Semi-finalists	(2)	£6,500
Quarter-finalists	(4)	£5,000
Third round losers	(8)	£3,000
Second round losers	(16)	£2,000*
First round losers	(16)	£1,000
Total	£140,000	

- Seeded players who lose in the second round do not receive this prize money on any Orders of Merit.

== Qualification and format ==
The top 16 entrants from the PDC ProTour Order of Merit on 28 June automatically qualified for the event and were seeded in the second round.

The remaining 32 places went to players from six qualifying events – 24 from the Tour Card Holder Qualifier (held on 9 July), one from the UK Associate Member Qualifier (held on 9 August), one from the European Associate Member Qualifier (held on 5 July), four from the Host Nation Qualifier (as there were no Gibraltarian Tour Card holders) (held on 23 September), one from the Nordic & Baltic Associate Member Qualifier (held in early 2020, and carried over), and one from the East European Associate Member Qualifier (held in early 2020, and carried over).

The following players took part in the tournament:

Top 16

1. Joe Cullen (third round)
2. José de Sousa (third round)
3. Peter Wright (second round)
4. Michael van Gerwen (quarter-finals)
5. Gerwyn Price (winner)
6. Michael Smith (second round)
7. Jonny Clayton (second round)
8. James Wade (quarter-finals)
9. Devon Petersen (second round)
10. Krzysztof Ratajski (quarter-finals)
11. Dirk van Duijvenbode (second round)
12. Damon Heta (third round)
13. Danny Noppert (third round)
14. Brendan Dolan (quarter-finals)
15. Mensur Suljović (runner-up)
16. Nathan Aspinall (semi-finals)

Tour Card Qualifier
- Martin Schindler (first round)
- Callan Rydz (third round)
- Keane Barry (first round)
- Wayne Jones (first round)
- Rob Cross (second round)
- Simon Whitlock (semi-finals)
- Stephen Bunting (first round)
- Martijn Kleermaker (first round)
- Adam Hunt (second round)
- Steve Beaton (first round)
- Geert Nentjes (first round)
- Ryan Murray (first round)
- Mervyn King (second round)
- Ted Evetts (third round)
- Luke Humphries (first round)
- John Henderson (first round)
- Gabriel Clemens (third round)
- Florian Hempel (second round)
- Boris Krčmar (second round)
- Joe Murnan (second round)
- Ryan Searle (second round)
- Kim Huybrechts (second round)
- Ritchie Edhouse (second round)
- Boris Koltsov (first round)

UK Associate Member Qualifier
- Adam Smith-Neale (third round)

European Associate Member Qualifier
- Kenny Neyens (second round)

Host Nation Gibraltar Qualifier
- (Gibraltar) Justin Broton (first round)
- Dyson Parody (first round)
- (Gibraltar) Craig Galliano (first round)
- (Gibraltar) Justin Hewitt (first round)

Nordic & Baltic Qualifier
- Andreas Harrysson (second round)

East European Qualifier
- Patrik Kovács (first round)

== Draw ==
First round (best of 11 legs); 24 September
Martijn Kleermaker 93.66	5
Joe Murnan 84.62	6
Ritchie Edhouse 91.36	6
Steve Beaton 83.93	4
John Henderson 90.72	2
Boris Krčmar 97.78	6
Luke Humphries 94.63	4
Gabriel Clemens 92.92	6
Patrik Kovács 85.08	4
Rob Cross 90.85	6
Andreas Harrysson 85.66	6
Keane Barry 89.21	3
Stephen Bunting 86.80	5
Florian Hempel 94.46	6
Adam Hunt 89.29	6
Geert Nentjes 85.85	0
Dyson Parody 72.48	4
Kenny Neyens 71.21	6
Boris Koltsov 92.23	2
Kim Huybrechts 105.08	6
Justin Broton 79.13	1
Adam Smith-Neale 93.88	6
Ryan Searle 96.34	6
Martin Schindler 95.45	5
Callan Rydz 103.77	6
Justin Hewitt 87.55	1
Mervyn King 94.93	6
Craig Galliano 79.50	0
Wayne Jones 89.09	1
Simon Whitlock 96.66	6
Ryan Murray 85.13	5
Ted Evetts 82.53	6

Second round (best of 11 legs); 25 September
1	Joe Cullen 88.36	6
Joe Murnan 79.09	1
16	Nathan Aspinall 102.55	6
Ritchie Edhouse 89.86	3
8	James Wade 95.89	6
Boris Krčmar 93.60	5
9	Devon Petersen 86.45	3
Gabriel Clemens 88.83	6
4	Michael van Gerwen 100.17	6
Rob Cross 92.70	3
13	Danny Noppert 94.76	6
Andreas Harrysson 85.39	2
5	Gerwyn Price 97.14	6
Florian Hempel 84.93	1
12	Damon Heta 92.39	6
Adam Hunt 84.13	3
2	José de Sousa 92.02	6
Kenny Neyens 75.18	0
15	Mensur Suljović 88.24	6
Kim Huybrechts 92.91	5
7	Jonny Clayton 94.89	4
Adam Smith-Neale 86.65	6
10	Krzysztof Ratajski 90.17	6
Ryan Searle 90.00	3
3	Peter Wright 108.19	3
Callan Rydz 110.72	6
14	Brendan Dolan 92.50	6
Mervyn King 89.54	1
6	Michael Smith 92.04	2
Simon Whitlock 91.81	6
11	Dirk van Duijvenbode 91.99	5
Ted Evetts 91.07	6

Third round (best of 11 legs); 26 September
1	Cullen 104.42	4
16	Aspinall 107.46	6
8	Wade 99.96	6
Clemens 87.44	3
4	van Gerwen 102.82	6
13	Noppert 102.52	5
5	Price 102.02	6
12	Heta 96.94	3
2	de Sousa 89.39	1
15	Suljović 101.03	6
Smith-Neale 91.18	2
10	Ratajski 88.85	6
Rydz 92.97	1
14	Dolan 97.78	6
Whitlock 94.75	6
Evetts 85.78	4

Quarter-finals (best of 11 legs); 26 September
16	Aspinall 98.97	6
8	Wade 91.37	2
4	van Gerwen 105.02	5
5	Price 103.61	6
15	Suljović 86.51	6
10	Ratajski 87.73	2
14	Dolan 84.20	4
Whitlock 83.40	6

Semi-finals (best of 13 legs); 26 September
16	Aspinall 101.04	3
5	Price 100.83	7
15	Suljović 98.07	7
Whitlock 85.92	5

Final (best of 15 legs); 26 September
5	Price 105.47	8
15	Suljović 88.47	0
