= 2022 Masters (darts) =

Tenth staging of the Masters darts tournament of the PDC

2022 Ladbrokes Masters

Tournament information
- Dates: 28–30 January 2022
- Venue: Arena MK
- Location: Milton Keynes, England
- Organisation(s): Professional Darts Corporation (PDC)
- Format: Legs; Final: best of 21 legs
- Prize fund: £220,000
- Winner's share: £60,000
- High checkout: 170 Dimitri Van den Bergh

Champion(s)
- Joe Cullen (ENG)

The 2022 PDC Masters (known for sponsorship reasons as the 2022 Ladbrokes Masters) was the tenth staging of the non-ranking Masters darts tournament, held by the Professional Darts Corporation (PDC). It was held from 28 to 30 January 2022 at the Arena MK in Milton Keynes, England.

Jonny Clayton was the defending champion after beating Mervyn King 11–8 in the 2021 final, but he lost 11–6 to Dave Chisnall in the semi-finals.

Joe Cullen won his first televised title by defeating Chisnall 11–9 in the final. He subsequently earned a place in the 2022 Premier League Darts, for the first time in his career.

This event was the last PDC event to use dartboards provided by Unicorn, as they announced that they would end their 25-year association with the PDC following this event.

== Qualifiers ==
The Masters featured the top 24 players in the PDC Order of Merit after the 2022 PDC World Darts Championship, with the top 8 automatically qualifying for the second round. Dirk van Duijvenbode, Ryan Searle, Luke Humphries and Gabriel Clemens made their debuts in the event.

Danny Noppert, who was due to be making his debut as 18th seed, withdrew after the draw for family reasons and was replaced by Simon Whitlock.

On 24 January, it was announced that Nathan Aspinall had withdrawn from the tournament, due to injury, and was replaced by Devon Petersen, who became the fifth debutant.

The following players took part in the tournament:

1. Gerwyn Price (quarter-finals)
2. Peter Wright (second round)
3. Michael van Gerwen (quarter-finals)
4. James Wade (second round)
5. Michael Smith (quarter-finals)
6. Gary Anderson (second round)
7. José de Sousa (semi-finals)
8. Jonny Clayton (semi-finals)
9. Dimitri Van den Bergh (second round)
10. Rob Cross (second round)
11. (England) Joe Cullen (champion)
12. Krzysztof Ratajski (second round)
13. Dave Chisnall (runner-up)
14. ~~Nathan Aspinall~~ (withdrew)
15. Dirk van Duijvenbode (first round)
16. Ryan Searle (second round)
17. Mervyn King (first round)
18. ~~Danny Noppert~~ (withdrew)
19. Luke Humphries (second round)
20. Stephen Bunting (first round)
21. Gabriel Clemens (first round)
22. Daryl Gurney (first round)
23. Brendan Dolan (first round)
24. Ian White (first round)
25. Simon Whitlock (quarter-finals)
26. Devon Petersen (first round)

== Prize money ==
The prize money was £220,000 in total, the same as 2021.

Stage (no. of players)		Prize money (Total: £220,000)
Winner	(1)	£60,000
Runner-up	(1)	£25,000
Semi-finalists	(2)	£17,500
Quarter-finalists	(4)	£10,000
Second round losers	(8)	£5,000
First round losers	(8)	£2,500

== Draw ==
First round (best of 11 legs); 28 January
16	Ryan Searle 91.17	6
17	Mervyn King 83.86	1
9	Dimitri Van den Bergh 105.31	6
24	Ian White 101.78	1
13	Dave Chisnall 92.97	6
20	Stephen Bunting 89.83	0
12	Krzysztof Ratajski 88.17	6
21	Gabriel Clemens 87.56	5
15	Dirk van Duijvenbode 88.47	2
Alt	Simon Whitlock 100.34	6
10	Rob Cross 88.42	6
23	Brendan Dolan 85.35	2
Alt	Devon Petersen 87.99	1
19	Luke Humphries 92.67	6
11	Joe Cullen 99.24	6
22	Daryl Gurney 95.63	2

Second round (best of 19 legs); 29 January
1	Gerwyn Price 95.38	10
16	Ryan Searle 95.33	8
8	Jonny Clayton 100.60	10
9	Dimitri Van den Bergh 98.08	9
4	James Wade 94.04	4
13	Dave Chisnall 100.19	10
5	Michael Smith 105.49	10
12	Krzysztof Ratajski 93.38	6
2	Peter Wright 96.55	8
Alt	Simon Whitlock 93.02	10
7	José de Sousa 98.70	10
10	Rob Cross 91.37	7
3	Michael van Gerwen 91.54	10
19	Luke Humphries 91.79	9
6	Gary Anderson 91.23	1
11	Joe Cullen 106.30	10

Quarter-finals (best of 19 legs); 30 January
1	Gerwyn Price 98.38	8
8	Jonny Clayton 104.19	10
13	Dave Chisnall 97.47	10
5	Michael Smith 99.33	8
Alt	Simon Whitlock 93.95	9
7	José de Sousa 96.23	10
3	Michael van Gerwen 93.57	7
11	Joe Cullen 92.60	10

Semi-finals (best of 21 legs); 30 January
8	Jonny Clayton 98.43	6
13	Dave Chisnall 97.45	11
7	José de Sousa 96.54	8
11	Joe Cullen 101.62	11

Final (best of 21 legs); 30 January
13	Dave Chisnall 90.23	9
11	Joe Cullen 96.89	11
