= 2021 World Matchplay =

Darts competition

2021 Betfred World Matchplay

Tournament information
- Dates: 17–25 July 2021
- Venue: Winter Gardens
- Location: Blackpool, England
- Organisation(s): Professional Darts Corporation (PDC)
- Format: Legs
- Prize fund: £700,000
- Winner's share: £150,000
- High checkout: 170 Callan Rydz

Champion(s)
- Peter Wright (SCO)

The 2021 Betfred World Matchplay was the 28th annual staging of the World Matchplay, organised by the Professional Darts Corporation. The tournament returned to the Winter Gardens, from 17 to 25 July 2021, with the 2020 staging of the event having been moved to the Marshall Arena, Milton Keynes due to the disruption caused by the COVID-19 pandemic.

Dimitri Van den Bergh was the defending champion, after beating Gary Anderson 18–10 in the 2020 final. However he was defeated by Peter Wright 18–9 in the final. Wright won his first World Matchplay, and became the fifth player to win both the PDC World Championship and the World Matchplay.

== Prize money ==
The prize fund remained at £700,000, with the winner's earnings being £150,000.

Position (no. of players)		Prize money (Total: £700,000)
Winner	(1)	£150,000
Runner-up	(1)	£70,000
Semi-finalists	(2)	£50,000
Quarter-finalists	(4)	£25,000
Second round	(8)	£15,000
First round	(16)	£10,000

== Format ==
All games have to be won by two clear legs, with a game being extended if necessary for a maximum of six extra legs before a tie-break leg is required. For example, in a first to 10 legs first round match, if the score reaches 12–12 then the 25th leg will be the decider.

The first round is played first to 10 legs, second round first to 11 legs, quarter-finals first to 16 legs, semi-finals first to 17 legs and final first to 18 legs.

== Qualification ==
The top 16 players on the PDC Order of Merit at the cut-off point on 10 July were seeded for the tournament. The top 16 players on the ProTour Order of Merit, not to have already qualified on the cut-off date were unseeded. The ProTour Order of Merit took all events from the 2020 Players Championship 14 on 11 September 2020 up until 2021 Players Championship 20 on 9 July 2021.

Mensur Suljović originally qualified through the ProTour Order of Merit, but withdrew for medical reasons. Jermaine Wattimena replaced him.

The following players qualified for the tournament:

=== PDC Order of Merit ===
1. Gerwyn Price (quarter-finals)
2. Peter Wright (champion)
3. Michael van Gerwen (semi-finals)
4. James Wade (first round)
5. Rob Cross (second round)
6. Gary Anderson (second round)
7. Michael Smith (quarter-finals)
8. Dimitri Van den Bergh (runner-up)
9. Dave Chisnall (second round)
10. José de Sousa (second round)
11. Nathan Aspinall (quarter-finals)
12. Glen Durrant (first round)
13. Krzysztof Ratajski (semi-finals)
14. Daryl Gurney (first round)
15. Joe Cullen (second round)
16. Jonny Clayton (second round)

=== PDC ProTour qualifiers ===
1. Brendan Dolan (first round)
2. Devon Petersen (first round)
3. Damon Heta (first round)
4. Danny Noppert (first round)
5. Dirk van Duijvenbode (first round)
6. Ross Smith (first round)
7. ~~Mensur Suljović (withdrew)~~
8. Stephen Bunting (first round)
9. Mervyn King (first round)
10. Luke Humphries (second round)
11. Gabriel Clemens (first round)
12. Vincent van der Voort (first round)
13. Ryan Searle (first round)
14. Ian White (second round)
15. Callan Rydz (quarter-finals)
16. Chris Dobey (first round)
17. Jermaine Wattimena (first round)

== Schedule ==
Saturday, 17 July

Game #	Round	Player 1	Score	Player 2	Break 1	Break 2
01	1	Dave Chisnall	10 – 8	Vincent van der Voort	3 – 2	6 – 4
02	1	Jonny Clayton	10 – 7	Dirk van Duijvenbode	3 – 2	5 – 5
03	1	Gerwyn Price	10 – 4	Jermaine Wattimena	3 – 2	6 – 4
04	1	Dimitri Van den Bergh	10 – 5	Devon Petersen	3 – 2	7 – 3

Sunday, 18 July

Game #	Round	Player 1	Score	Player 2	Break 1	Break 2
05	1	Krzysztof Ratajski	10 – 4	Brendan Dolan	3 – 2	7 – 3
06	1	Glen Durrant	6 – 10	Callan Rydz	0 – 5	3 – 7
07	1	Rob Cross	10 – 8	Ross Smith	2 – 3	7 – 3
08	1	James Wade	3 – 10	Luke Humphries	1 – 4	2 – 8
09	1	Joe Cullen	10 – 8	Chris Dobey	3 – 2	5 – 5
10	1	Michael Smith	10 – 7	Ryan Searle	3 – 2	7 – 3
11	1	Peter Wright	10 – 2	Danny Noppert	4 – 1	8 – 2
12	1	José de Sousa	10 – 2	Gabriel Clemens	5 – 0	9 – 1

Monday, 19 July

Game #	Round	Player 1	Score	Player 2	Break 1	Break 2
13	1	Daryl Gurney	7 – 10	Ian White	2 – 3	3 – 7
14	1	Nathan Aspinall	10 – 6	Mervyn King	4 – 1	6 – 4
15	1	Michael van Gerwen	10 – 7	Damon Heta	3 – 2	4 – 6
16	1	Gary Anderson	10 – 5	Stephen Bunting	3 – 2	7 – 3

Tuesday, 20 July

Game #	Round	Player 1	Score	Player 2	Break 1	Break 2
17	2	Rob Cross	8 – 11	Callan Rydz	3 – 2	5 – 5
18	2	Luke Humphries	5 – 11	Krzysztof Ratajski	1 – 4	4 – 6
19	2	Gerwyn Price	11 – 3	Jonny Clayton	3 – 2	7 – 3
20	2	Dimitri Van den Bergh	11 – 8	Dave Chisnall	3 – 2	6 – 4

Wednesday, 21 July

Game #	Round	Player 1	Score	Player 2	Break 1	Break 2	Break 3
21	2	Michael Smith	13 – 11	José de Sousa	3 – 2	5 – 5	10 – 10
22	2	Gary Anderson	9 – 11	Nathan Aspinall	2 – 3	4 – 6	—N/a
23	2	Michael van Gerwen	11 – 8	Ian White	2 – 3	5 – 5	—N/a
24	2	Peter Wright	11 – 5	Joe Cullen	3 – 2	7 – 3	—N/a

Thursday, 22 July

Game #	Round	Player 1	Score	Player 2	Break 1	Break 2	Break 3	Break 4
25	QF	Krzysztof Ratajski	16 – 8	Callan Rydz	3 – 2	7 – 3	10 – 5	13 – 7
26	QF	Gerwyn Price	9 – 16	Dimitri Van den Bergh	2 – 3	4 – 6	7 – 8	8 – 12

Friday, 23 July

Game #	Round	Player 1	Score	Player 2	Break 1	Break 2	Break 3	Break 4
27	QF	Peter Wright	16 – 7	Michael Smith	3 – 2	6 – 4	11 – 4	13 – 7
28	QF	Michael van Gerwen	16 – 9	Nathan Aspinall	3 – 2	6 – 4	10 – 5	13 – 7

Saturday, 24 July

Game #	Round	Player 1	Score	Player 2	Break 1	Break 2	Break 3	Break 4
29	SF	Dimitri Van den Bergh	17 – 9	Krzysztof Ratajski	1 – 4	4 – 6	9 – 6	11 – 9
30	SF	Peter Wright	17 – 10	Michael van Gerwen	4 – 1	6 – 4	10 – 5	11 – 9

Sunday, 25 July

Game #	Round	Player 1	Score	Player 2	Break 1	Break 2	Break 3	Break 4	Break 5
31	F	Dimitri Van den Bergh	9 – 18	Peter Wright	1 – 4	2 – 8	5 – 10	8 – 12	8 – 17

== Draw ==
First round (best of 19 legs); 17–19 July
1	Gerwyn Price 96.57	10
Jermaine Wattimena 84.90	4
16	Jonny Clayton 96.00	10
Dirk van Duijvenbode 92.72	7
8	Dimitri Van den Bergh 94.60	10
Devon Petersen 84.05	5
9	Dave Chisnall 97.72	10
Vincent van der Voort 94.37	8
4	James Wade 93.48	3
Luke Humphries 101.08	10
13	Krzysztof Ratajski 101.57	10
Brendan Dolan 96.08	4
5	Rob Cross 100.22	10
Ross Smith 91.48	8
12	Glen Durrant 84.03	6
Callan Rydz 82.04	10
2	Peter Wright 99.75	10
Danny Noppert 92.14	2
15	Joe Cullen 98.07	10
Chris Dobey 97.06	8
7	Michael Smith 92.46	10
Ryan Searle 92.00	7
10	José de Sousa 97.45	10
Gabriel Clemens 92.08	2
3	Michael van Gerwen 95.69	10
Damon Heta 90.22	7
14	Daryl Gurney 94.34	7
Ian White 94.06	10
6	Gary Anderson 94.42	10
Stephen Bunting 84.42	5
11	Nathan Aspinall 94.59	10
Mervyn King 92.38	6

Second round (best of 21 legs); 20–21 July
1	Gerwyn Price 101.11	11
16	Jonny Clayton 96.91	3
8	Dimitri Van den Bergh 103.68	11
9	Dave Chisnall 95.88	8
Luke Humphries 98.23	5
13	Krzysztof Ratajski 99.94	11
5	Rob Cross 94.73	8
Callan Rydz 92.42	11
2	Peter Wright 105.46	11
15	Joe Cullen 90.12	5
7	Michael Smith 99.73	13
10	José de Sousa 97.72	11
3	Michael van Gerwen 100.68	11
Ian White 93.83	8
6	Gary Anderson 97.38	9
11	Nathan Aspinall 98.98	11

Quarter-finals (best of 31 legs); 22–23 July
1	Gerwyn Price 98.19	9
8	Dimitri Van den Bergh 102.27	16
13	Krzysztof Ratajski 97.34	16
Callan Rydz 88.11	8
2	Peter Wright 100.37	16
7	Michael Smith 99.23	7
3	Michael van Gerwen 94.72	16
11	Nathan Aspinall 90.21	9

Semi-finals (best of 33 legs); 24 July
8	Dimitri Van den Bergh 98.51	17
13	Krzysztof Ratajski 96.56	9
2	Peter Wright 110.37	17
3	Michael van Gerwen 101.34	10

Final (best of 35 legs); 25 July
8	Dimitri Van den Bergh 100.88	9
2	Peter Wright 105.90	18

== Statistics ==
=== General ===
Player	Eliminated	Played	Legs Won	Legs Lost	100+	140+	180s	High checkout	Checkout Av.%	Average
Peter Wright	Winner	5	72	33	145	90	41	149	48.00	104.37
Dimitri Van den Bergh	Runner-up	5	63	49	120	80	49	128	35.59	99.99
Krzysztof Ratajski	Semi-final	4	46	34	102	54	22	140	36.80	98.85
Michael van Gerwen	Semi-final	4	47	41	95	64	18	127	41.23	98.11
Michael Smith	Quarter-finals	3	30	34	86	51	12	136	43.48	97.14
Nathan Aspinall	Quarter-finals	3	30	31	80	41	17	130	25.00	94.59
Gerwyn Price	Quarter-finals	3	30	23	86	30	13	132	38.96	98.62
Callan Rydz	Quarter-finals	3	29	30	63	24	9	170	45.31	87.52
Luke Humphries	Second round	2	15	14	24	27	14	121	30.61	99.66
José de Sousa	Second round	2	21	15	43	25	12	116	40.38	97.63
Rob Cross	Second round	2	18	19	55	26	6	132	33.33	97.48
Dave Chisnall	Second round	2	18	19	37	14	9	161	64.29	96.79
Jonny Clayton	Second round	2	18	19	51	30	4	161	35.14	96.39
Gary Anderson	Second round	2	19	16	48	27	6	149	37.25	96.07
Joe Cullen	Second round	2	15	19	38	19	8	92	51.72	94.43
Ian White	Second round	2	18	18	54	25	5	117	37.25	93.94
Chris Dobey	First round	1	8	10	38	14	8	78	40.00	97.06
Brendan Dolan	First round	1	4	10	31	12	1	121	33.33	96.08
Vincent van der Voort	First round	1	8	10	35	17	6	129	34.78	94.37
Daryl Gurney	First round	1	7	10	45	17	4	130	36.84	94.34
James Wade	First round	1	3	10	27	14	2	148	21.43	93.48
Dirk van Duijvenbode	First round	1	7	10	31	13	7	164	33.33	92.72
Mervyn King	First round	1	6	10	32	17	5	62	28.57	92.38
Danny Noppert	First round	1	2	10	24	10	2	40	15.38	92.14
Gabriel Clemens	First round	1	2	10	28	9	2	52	20.00	92.08
Ryan Searle	First round	1	7	10	32	15	3	98	38.89	92.00
Ross Smith	First round	1	8	10	33	15	7	81	47.06	91.48
Damon Heta	First round	1	7	10	39	10	2	84	43.75	90.22
Jermaine Wattimena	First round	1	4	10	20	9	1	116	33.33	84.90
Stephen Bunting	First round	1	5	10	26	10	2	60	41.67	84.42
Devon Petersen	First round	1	5	10	30	12	0	72	35.71	84.05
Glen Durrant	First round	1	6	10	32	12	2	90	17.14	84.03

Source: Match reports from the draw.

=== Top averages ===
This table shows the highest averages achieved by players throughout the tournament.

#	Player	Round	Average	Result
1	Peter Wright	SF	110.37	Won
2	Peter Wright	F	105.90	Won
3	Peter Wright	2	105.46	Won
4	Dimitri Van den Bergh	2	103.29	Won
5	Dimitri Van den Bergh	QF	102.27	Won
6	Krzysztof Ratajski	1	101.57	Won
7	Michael van Gerwen	SF	101.34	Lost
8	Gerwyn Price	2	101.11	Won
9	Luke Humphries	1	101.08	Won
10	Dimitri Van den Bergh	F	100.88	Lost

== Representation ==
This table shows the number of players by country in the 2021 World Matchplay. A total of 11 nationalities are represented.

	(Scotland) SCO	(Belgium) BEL	(Netherlands) NED	(Poland) POL	(England) ENG	(Wales) WAL	(Portugal) POR	(Northern Ireland) NIR	(Australia) AUS	(Germany) GER	(South Africa) RSA	Total
Final	1	1	—N/a									2
Semi-final	1	1	1	1	—N/a							4
Quarter-final	1	1	1	1	3	1	—N/a					8
Round 2	2	1	1	1	8	2	1	—N/a				16
Round 1	2	1	5	1	15	2	1	2	1	1	1	32
Total	2	1	5	1	15	2	1	2	1	1	1	32
