= 2019 Players Championship Finals =

2019 Ladbrokes Players Championship Finals

Tournament information
- Dates: 22–24 November 2019
- Venue: Butlin's Minehead
- Location: Minehead, England
- Organisation(s): Professional Darts Corporation (PDC)
- Format: Legs
- Prize fund: £500,000
- Winner's share: £100,000
- Nine-dart finish: Michael van Gerwen
- High checkout: 170; Jelle Klaasen; Michael van Gerwen

Champion(s)
- Michael van Gerwen (NED)

The 2019 Ladbrokes Players Championship Finals was the twelfth edition of the PDC darts tournament, which sees the top 64 players from the 30 Players Championship events of 2019 taking part. The tournament took place from 22 to 24 November 2019 at Butlin's Resort in Minehead.

Daryl Gurney was the defending champion after defeating Michael van Gerwen 11–9 in the 2018 competition, but he lost 6–5 in the first round to Luke Woodhouse.

Van Gerwen hit the first televised nine-dart finish in over a year in his second round victory over Adrian Lewis.

Van Gerwen went on to become Players Champion for the fifth time, beating Gerwyn Price 11–9 in the final.

== Prize money ==
The 2019 Players Championship Finals will have a total prize fund of £500,000, an increase from the £460,000 available in 2018.

The following is the breakdown of the fund:

Position (no. of players)		Prize money (Total: £500,000)
Winner	(1)	£100,000
Runner-up	(1)	£50,000
Semi-finalists	(2)	£25,000
Quarter-finalists	(4)	£15,000
Last 16 (third round)	(8)	£10,000
Last 32 (second round)	(16)	£5,000
Last 64 (first round)	(32)	£2,500

== Qualification ==
The top 64 players from the Players Championships Order of Merit qualify, which is solely based on prize money won in the thirty Players Championships events during the season:

Click on the seed number of a player to go to their draw section.

=== Top 64 in the Players Championship Order of Merit ===
1. (Wales) Gerwyn Price (runner-up)
2. (England) James Wade (third round)
3. (Poland) Krzysztof Ratajski (second round)
4. (Scotland) Peter Wright (first round)
5. (England) Glen Durrant (third round)
6. (England) Ian White (semi-finals)
7. (England) Dave Chisnall (second round)
8. (Portugal) José de Sousa (second round)
9. (Wales) Jonny Clayton (first round)
10. (Netherlands) Jermaine Wattimena (first round)
11. (England) Michael Smith (third round)
12. (England) Nathan Aspinall (first round)
13. (Netherlands) Jeffrey de Zwaan (first round)
14. (Northern Ireland) Daryl Gurney (first round)
15. (England) Adrian Lewis (second round)
16. (Austria) Mensur Suljović (third round)
17. (Netherlands) Danny Noppert (second round)
18. (Netherlands) Michael van Gerwen (champion)
19. (Germany) Gabriel Clemens (third round)
20. (Scotland) John Henderson (third round)
21. (England) Joe Cullen (second round)
22. (Northern Ireland) Brendan Dolan (second round)
23. (Netherlands) Ron Meulenkamp (first round)
24. (England) Harry Ward (first round)
25. (Belgium) Dimitri Van den Bergh (first round)
26. (England) Justin Pipe (first round)
27. (Netherlands) Vincent van der Voort (second round)
28. (Germany) Max Hopp (second round)
29. (England) Chris Dobey (semi-finals)
30. (Republic of Ireland) William O'Connor (quarter-finals)
31. (England) Steve Beaton (first round)
32. (England) Keegan Brown (second round)
33. (England) Andy Boulton (first round)
34. (England) Ricky Evans (second round)
35. (England) Steve West (first round)
36. (Spain) Cristo Reyes (first round)
37. (Netherlands) Jelle Klaasen (first round)
38. (England) Arron Monk (first round)
39. (England) Mervyn King (quarter-finals)
40. (England) Stephen Bunting (quarter-finals)
41. (Lithuania) Darius Labanauskas (second round)
42. (England) Rob Cross (third round)
43. (England) Ross Smith (first round)
44. (Australia) Kyle Anderson (first round)
45. (England) Ryan Joyce (first round)
46. (England) Mark McGeeney (first round)
47. (England) Luke Humphries (first round)
48. (England) Ryan Searle (first round)
49. (Belgium) Kim Huybrechts (first round)
50. (England) Josh Payne (first round)
51. (England) Luke Woodhouse (second round)
52. (Australia) Simon Whitlock (second round)
53. (Netherlands) Raymond van Barneveld (quarter-finals)
54. (Germany) Martin Schindler (first round)
55. (England) Jamie Hughes (second round)
56. (England) Ryan Meikle (third round)
57. (England) James Richardson (first round)
58. (England) Matthew Edgar (first round)
59. (South Africa) Devon Petersen (first round)
60. (England) Scott Baker (first round)
61. (England) James Wilson (second round)
62. (Republic of Ireland) Steve Lennon (first round)
63. (England) Ted Evetts (first round)
64. (Northern Ireland) Mickey Mansell (first round)

== Draw ==
There was no draw held, all players were put in a fixed bracket by their seeding positions.

=== Finals ===
Quarter-finals (best of 19 legs); 24 November
1	(Wales) Gerwyn Price 108.75	10
40	(England) Stephen Bunting 100.84	3
53	(Netherlands) Raymond van Barneveld 88.36	2
29	(England) Chris Dobey 90.67	10
18	(Netherlands) Michael van Gerwen 92.15	10
39	(England) Mervyn King 89.68	6
6	(England) Ian White 93.51	10
30	(Republic of Ireland) William O'Connor 94.80	9

Semi-finals (best of 21 legs); 24 November
1	(Wales) Gerwyn Price 100.24	11
29	(England) Chris Dobey 95.12	8
18	(Netherlands) Michael van Gerwen 103.61	11
6	(England) Ian White 102.38	8

Final (best of 21 legs); 24 November
1	(Wales) Gerwyn Price 96.48	9
18	(Netherlands) Michael van Gerwen 97.92	11

=== Top half ===
==== Section 1 ====
First round (best of 11 legs); 22 November
1	(Wales) Gerwyn Price 101.95	6
64	(Northern Ireland) Mickey Mansell 96.27	3
32	(England) Keegan Brown 86.34	6
33	(England) Andy Boulton 85.04	3
16	(Austria) Mensur Suljović 95.21	6
49	(Belgium) Kim Huybrechts 96.42	5
17	(Netherlands) Danny Noppert 99.48	6
48	(England) Ryan Searle 91.08	5
8	(Portugal) José de Sousa 91.09	6
57	(England) James Richardson 91.91	3
25	(Belgium) Dimitri Van den Bergh 89.65	2
40	(England) Stephen Bunting 94.55	6
9	(Wales) Jonny Clayton 84.61	0
56	(England) Ryan Meikle 90.18	6
24	(England) Harry Ward 90.31	5
41	(Lithuania) Darius Labanauskas 90.95	6

Second round (best of 11 legs); 23 November
1	(Wales) Gerwyn Price 94.93	6
32	(England) Keegan Brown 88.17	0
16	(Austria) Mensur Suljović 95.17	6
17	(Netherlands) Danny Noppert 92.38	5
8	(Portugal) José de Sousa 102.76	3
40	(England) Stephen Bunting 104.62	6
56	(England) Ryan Meikle 86.97	6
41	(Lithuania) Darius Labanauskas 95.84	5

Third round (best of 19 legs); 23 November
1	(Wales) Gerwyn Price 101.88	10
16	(Austria) Mensur Suljović 92.86	4
40	(England) Stephen Bunting 107.03	10
56	(England) Ryan Meikle 94.68	2

Quarter-finals (best of 19 legs); 24 November
1	(Wales) Gerwyn Price 108.75	10
40	(England) Stephen Bunting 100.84	3

==== Section 2 ====
First round (best of 11 legs); 22 November
5	(England) Glen Durrant 94.45	6
60	(England) Scott Baker 84.31	2
28	(Germany) Max Hopp 87.84	6
37	(Netherlands) Jelle Klaasen 87.11	3
12	(England) Nathan Aspinall 96.03	2
53	(Netherlands) Raymond van Barneveld 98.90	6
21	(England) Joe Cullen 99.78	6
44	(Australia) Kyle Anderson 89.76	2
4	(Scotland) Peter Wright 97.12	5
61	(England) James Wilson 91.56	6
29	(England) Chris Dobey 94.55	6
36	(Spain) Cristo Reyes 86.06	1
13	(Netherlands) Jeffrey de Zwaan 98.29	5
52	(Australia) Simon Whitlock 93.96	6
20	(Scotland) John Henderson 95.75	6
45	(England) Ryan Joyce 93.33	5

Second round (best of 11 legs); 23 November
5	(England) Glen Durrant 98.02	6
28	(Germany) Max Hopp 85.86	5
53	(Netherlands) Raymond van Barneveld 98.37	6
21	(England) Joe Cullen 89.22	3
61	(England) James Wilson 81.71	0
29	(England) Chris Dobey 94.93	6
52	(Australia) Simon Whitlock 91.30	3
20	(Scotland) John Henderson 96.04	6

Third round (best of 19 legs); 23 November
5	(England) Glen Durrant 92.51	3
53	(Netherlands) Raymond van Barneveld 96.91	10
29	(England) Chris Dobey 95.21	10
20	(Scotland) John Henderson 86.75	5

Quarter-finals (best of 19 legs); 24 November
53	(Netherlands) Raymond van Barneveld 88.36	2
29	(England) Chris Dobey 90.67	10

=== Bottom half ===
==== Section 3 ====
First round (best of 11 legs); 22 November
2	(England) James Wade 98.43	6
63	(England) Ted Evetts 98.26	4
31	(England) Steve Beaton 88.71	5
34	(England) Ricky Evans 87.65	6
15	(England) Adrian Lewis 96.50	6
50	(England) Josh Payne 93.21	4
18	(Netherlands) Michael van Gerwen 100.06	6
47	(England) Luke Humphries 97.08	3
7	(England) Dave Chisnall 93.12	6
58	(England) Matthew Edgar 74.19	2
26	(England) Justin Pipe 94.61	5
39	(England) Mervyn King 100.71	6
10	(Netherlands) Jermaine Wattimena 92.46	3
55	(England) Jamie Hughes 99.95	6
23	(Netherlands) Ron Meulenkamp 79.22	2
42	(England) Rob Cross 90.26	6

Second round (best of 11 legs); 23 November
2	(England) James Wade 96.72	6
34	(England) Ricky Evans 87.21	1
15	(England) Adrian Lewis 95.50	5
18	(Netherlands) Michael van Gerwen 96.40	6
7	(England) Dave Chisnall 95.62	4
39	(England) Mervyn King 93.49	6
55	(England) Jamie Hughes 98.36	4
42	(England) Rob Cross 101.57	6

Third round (best of 19 legs); 23 November
2	(England) James Wade 102.01	6
18	(Netherlands) Michael van Gerwen 105.96	10
39	(England) Mervyn King 105.09	10
42	(England) Rob Cross 95.05	4

Quarter-finals (best of 19 legs); 24 November
18	(Netherlands) Michael van Gerwen 92.15	10
39	(England) Mervyn King 89.68	6

==== Section 4 ====
First round (best of 11 legs); 22 November
6	(England) Ian White 96.97	6
59	(South Africa) Devon Petersen 97.85	4
27	(Netherlands) Vincent van der Voort 93.11	6
38	(England) Arron Monk 85.44	4
11	(England) Michael Smith 88.20	6
54	(Germany) Martin Schindler 81.49	1
22	(Northern Ireland) Brendan Dolan 91.45	6
43	(England) Ross Smith 76.90	1
3	(Poland) Krzysztof Ratajski 91.66	6
62	(Republic of Ireland) Steve Lennon 88.19	1
30	(Republic of Ireland) William O'Connor 98.08	6
35	(England) Steve West 94.26	4
14	(Northern Ireland) Daryl Gurney 92.95	5
51	(England) Luke Woodhouse 90.94	6
19	(Germany) Gabriel Clemens 93.06	6
46	(England) Mark McGeeney 91.38	4

Second round (best of 11 legs); 23 November
6	(England) Ian White 94.20	6
27	(Netherlands) Vincent van der Voort 96.87	5
11	(England) Michael Smith 84.82	6
22	(Northern Ireland) Brendan Dolan 79.24	4
3	(Poland) Krzysztof Ratajski 97.44	3
30	(Republic of Ireland) William O'Connor 96.02	6
51	(England) Luke Woodhouse 92.27	3
19	(Germany) Gabriel Clemens 89.33	6

Third round (best of 19 legs); 23 November
6	(England) Ian White 107.46	10
11	(England) Michael Smith 100.36	4
30	(Republic of Ireland) William O'Connor 95.09	10
19	(Germany) Gabriel Clemens 102.20	7

Quarter-finals (best of 19 legs); 24 November
6	(England) Ian White 93.51	10
30	(Republic of Ireland) William O'Connor 94.80	9
