= 2021 Hungarian Darts Trophy =

Inaugural edition of Hungarian Darts Trophy

Tournament information
- Dates: 3–5 September 2021
- Venue: László Papp Budapest Sports Arena
- Location: Budapest, Hungary
- Organisation(s): Professional Darts Corporation (PDC)
- Format: Legs
- Prize fund: £140,000
- Winner's share: £25,000
- High checkout: 161 Geert De Vos

Champion(s)
- Gerwyn Price (WAL)

The 2021 Hungarian Darts Trophy was the first PDC European Tour event on the 2021 PDC Pro Tour. The tournament took place at the László Papp Budapest Sports Arena, Budapest, Hungary from 3 to 5 September 2021. It featured a field of 47 players and £140,000 in prize money, with £25,000 going to the winner.

Gerwyn Price became the inaugural champion after defeating Michael Smith 8–2 in the final, winning his 4th European Tour title.

This was the first PDC tournament held in Hungary; the tournament was originally scheduled to take place in 2020, but was cancelled due to the COVID-19 pandemic.

== Prize money ==
This is how the prize money was divided, with the prize money being unchanged from the 2019 & 2020 European Tours:

Stage (num. of players)		Prize money
Winner	(1)	£25,000
Runner-up	(1)	£10,000
Semi-finalists	(2)	£6,500
Quarter-finalists	(4)	£5,000
Third round losers	(8)	£3,000
Second round losers	(16)	£2,000*
First round losers	(16)	£1,000
Total	£140,000	

- Seeded players who lose in the second round do not receive this prize money on any Orders of Merit.

== Qualification and format ==
The top 16 entrants from the PDC Pro Tour Order of Merit on 28 June automatically qualified for the event and were seeded in the second round.

The remaining 32 places went to players from six qualifying events – 24 from the Tour Card Holder Qualifier (held on 9 July), one from the UK Associate Member Qualifier (held on 9 August), one from the European Associate Member Qualifier (held on 5 July), four from the Host Nation Qualifier (as there are no Hungarian Tour Card holders) (held on 31 July), one from the Nordic & Baltic Associate Member Qualifier (held in early 2020, and carried over), and one from the East European Associate Member Qualifier (held in 2020 and carried over).

Danny Noppert withdrew prior to the tournament, which meant Rob Cross became a seed, and a random player was drawn to receive a bye to round two. That player was William O'Connor.

The following players took part in the tournament:

Top 16

1. Joe Cullen (quarter-finals)
2. José de Sousa (semi-finals)
3. Peter Wright (quarter-finals)
4. Michael van Gerwen (third round)
5. Gerwyn Price (winner)
6. Michael Smith (runner-up)
7. Jonny Clayton (second round)
8. James Wade (third round)
9. Devon Petersen (second round)
10. Krzysztof Ratajski (second round)
11. Dirk van Duijvenbode (second round)
12. Damon Heta (third round)
13. Brendan Dolan (quarter-finals)
14. Mensur Suljović (second round)
15. Nathan Aspinall (third round)
16. Rob Cross (third round)

Tour Card Qualifier
- Ross Smith (second round)
- John Michael (second round)
- Lewy Williams (third round)
- Geert De Vos (second round)
- Keegan Brown (first round)
- Joe Murnan (second round)
- Simon Whitlock (second round)
- Daryl Gurney (second round)
- Darren Webster (first round)
- Steve Beaton (first round)
- Jake Jones (first round)
- Alan Soutar (second round)
- Madars Razma (first round)
- Luke Humphries (semi-finals)
- William Borland (third round, withdrew)
- Adrian Lewis (first round)
- Bradley Brooks (second round)
- Vincent van der Voort (first round)
- William O'Connor (second round)
- Boris Krčmar (first round)
- Florian Hempel (second round)
- Geert Nentjes (first round)
- Keane Barry (third round)

UK Associate Member Qualifier
- Thomas Lovely (first round)

European Associate Member Qualifier
- Richard Veenstra (second round)

Host Nation Qualifier
- Péter Strbik (first round)
- János Végső (first round)
- Gábor Jagicza (first round)
- József Rucska (first round)

Nordic & Baltic Qualifier
- Johan Engström (first round)

East European Qualifier
- Adam Gawlas (quarter-finals)

== Draw ==
First round (best of 11 legs); 3 September
Geert Nentjes 90.17	2
Geert De Vos 88.77	6
Péter Strbik 90.11	0
Ross Smith 100.20	6
William O'Connor	bye
Luke Humphries 91.87	6
Madars Razma 90.94	3
Vincent van der Voort 93.03	2
Daryl Gurney 99.51	6
Alan Soutar 97.43	6
József Rucska 73.92	1
Richard Veenstra 84.66	6
Keegan Brown 84.47	4
Simon Whitlock 98.23	6
Darren Webster 90.71	4
János Végső 80.57	5
Joe Murnan 92.31	6
Adrian Lewis 99.63	5
Bradley Brooks 95.19	6
Boris Krčmar 97.11	5
Adam Gawlas 96.94	6
Gábor Jagicza 78.30	3
Lewy Williams 86.55	6
Florian Hempel 89.04	6
Jake Jones 85.98	5
Johan Engström 84.65	4
William Borland 87.84	6
Steve Beaton 97.64	5
John Michael 98.93	6
Thomas Lovely 90.91	3
Keane Barry 91.99	6

Second round (best of 11 legs); 4 September
1	Joe Cullen 100.10	6
Geert De Vos 82.38	3
16	Rob Cross 94.02	6
Ross Smith 90.08	4
8	James Wade 99.45	6
William O'Connor 99.02	5
9	Devon Petersen 90.93	2
Luke Humphries 101.08	6
4	Michael van Gerwen 101.51	6
Daryl Gurney 101.16	4
13	Brendan Dolan 93.50	6
Alan Soutar 90.74	1
5	Gerwyn Price 92.68	6
Richard Veenstra 84.88	4
12	Damon Heta 95.82	6
Simon Whitlock 89.39	4
2	José de Sousa 94.87	6
Joe Murnan 94.01	3
15	Nathan Aspinall 101.68	6
Bradley Brooks 91.13	1
7	Jonny Clayton 88.66	5
Adam Gawlas 83.78	6
10	Krzysztof Ratajski 96.71	3
Lewy Williams 98.79	6
3	Peter Wright 93.00	6
Florian Hempel 95.10	3
14	Mensur Suljović 96.22	5
William Borland 94.46	6
6	Michael Smith 101.08	6
John Michael 94.02	3
11	Dirk van Duijvenbode 84.65	3
Keane Barry 95.07	6

Third round (best of 11 legs); 5 September
1	Cullen 97.03	6
16	Cross 93.38	4
8	Wade 95.73	2
Humphries 97.53	6
4	van Gerwen 99.18	5
13	Dolan 94.72	6
5	Price 89.74	6
12	Heta 90.49	4
2	de Sousa 91.35	6
15	Aspinall 81.07	2
Gawlas 98.16	6
Williams 89.92	2
3	Wright	w/o
Borland	w/d^{1}
6	M. Smith 84.80	6
Barry 84.94	1

Quarter-finals (best of 11 legs); 5 September
1	Cullen 93.43	4
Humphries 92.64	6
13	Dolan 87.10	4
5	Price 91.49	6
2	de Sousa 90.64	6
Gawlas 92.86	5
3	Wright 91.76	2
6	M. Smith 91.78	6

Semi-finals (best of 13 legs); 5 September
Humphries 100.05	4
5	Price 107.21	7
2	de Sousa 94.74	5
6	M. Smith 98.54	7

Final (best of 15 legs); 5 September
5	Price 108.74	8
6	M. Smith 92.17	2

1 William Borland withdrew due to a personal issue. Therefore, Peter Wright received a bye into the quarter-finals.
