= 2020 German Darts Championship =

2020 edition of German Darts Championship

Tournament information
- Dates: 25–27 September 2020
- Venue: Halle 39
- Location: Hildesheim, Germany
- Organisation(s): Professional Darts Corporation (PDC)
- Format: Legs
- Prize fund: £140,000
- Winner's share: £25,000
- High checkout: 170 Mervyn King

Champion(s)
- Devon Petersen

The 2020 German Darts Championship was a PDC European Tour event on the 2020 PDC Pro Tour. The tournament took place at Halle 39, Hildesheim, Germany. It featured a field of 48 players and £140,000 in prize money, with £25,000 going to the winner. It was the second event on the 2020 European Tour.

Daryl Gurney was the defending champion after defeating Ricky Evans 8–6 in the final of the 2019 tournament, but he lost 6–2 to Danny Noppert in the quarter-finals.

Devon Petersen won his first PDC title, beating Jonny Clayton 8–3 in the final, which also meant he became the first player from Africa to win a PDC ranking title outside of Africa.

== Prize money ==
This is how the prize money is divided, with the prize money being unchanged from the 2019 European Tour:

| Stage (num. of players) | | Prize money |
|---|---|---|
| Winner | (1) | £25,000 |
| Runner-up | (1) | £10,000 |
| Semi-finalists | (2) | £6,500 |
| Quarter-finalists | (4) | £5,000 |
| Third round losers | (8) | £3,000 |
| Second round losers | (16) | £2,000* |
| First round losers | (16) | £1,000* |
| Total | £140,000 | |

- Seeded players who lose in the second round and Host Nation invitees who lose in the first round do not receive this prize money on any Orders of Merit.

== Qualification and format ==
The tournament used the qualifiers from the 2020 European Darts Grand Prix, which was planned to be held in March as the second tournament of the 2020 tour but was cancelled due to the COVID-19 pandemic.

The top 16 entrants from the PDC ProTour Order of Merit on 4 February automatically qualify for the event and will be seeded in the second round.

The remaining 32 places go to players from four qualifying events and to two invitees – 24 from the Tour Card Holder Qualifier (held on 14 February), two from the Associate Member Qualifier (held on 24 September), two from the Host Nation Qualifier (held on 24 September), one from the Nordic & Baltic Associate Member Qualifier (held on 12 October 2019), and one from the East European Associate Member Qualifier (held on 8 February).

The two highest ranked German players on the Pro Tour Order of Merit on the cut-off date of 4 February also qualified.

From 2020, all Tour Card holders will enter into one qualifier instead of two separate ones for the UK and Europe. For this tournament, Daniel Larsson qualified as the Nordic & Baltic qualifier, even though he won a PDC Tour Card at 2020 Q-School, as this was due to the qualifying event taking place before Q-School.

Niels Zonneveld & Simon Stevenson withdrew prior to the draw and were replaced with additional Host Nation Qualifiers.

The following players will take part in the tournament:

Top 16

1. (Netherlands) Michael van Gerwen (third round)
2. (England) Ian White (second round)
3. (Wales) Gerwyn Price (second round)
4. (Scotland) Peter Wright (third round)
5. (England) Dave Chisnall (quarter-finals)
6. (Poland) Krzysztof Ratajski (quarter-finals)
7. (Northern Ireland) Daryl Gurney (quarter-finals)
8. (Austria) Mensur Suljović (third round)
9. (England) James Wade (quarter-finals)
10. (England) Glen Durrant (third round)
11. (England) Joe Cullen (third round)
12. (England) Nathan Aspinall (third round)
13. (Wales) Jonny Clayton (runner-up)
14. (England) Rob Cross (third round)
15. (England) Adrian Lewis (second round)
16. (Netherlands) Jermaine Wattimena (second round)

Tour Card Qualifier
- (England) Josh Payne (first round)
- (England) Adam Hunt (second round)
- (Netherlands) Jeffrey de Zwaan (first round)
- (Republic of Ireland) Steve Lennon (second round)
- (England) Michael Smith (second round)
- (Australia) Darren Penhall (first round)
- (Canada) Jeff Smith (second round)
- (England) Mervyn King (semi-finals)
- (England) Jason Lowe (first round)
- (South Africa) Devon Petersen (champion)
- (Germany) Steffen Siepmann (first round)
- (Republic of Ireland) William O'Connor (second round)
- (England) Alan Tabern (first round)
- (Scotland) Ryan Murray (first round)
- (England) Scott Waites (second round)
- (Netherlands) Ron Meulenkamp (first round)
- (England) Chris Dobey (second round)
- (England) Steve Brown (first round)
- (Netherlands) Danny Noppert (semi-finals)
- (England) Reece Robinson (first round)
- (England) Steve West (first round)
- (England) Richard North (second round)

Associate Member Qualifier
- (Belgium) Ronny Huybrechts (first round)
- (New Zealand) Cody Harris (first round)

Highest Ranked Germans
- (Germany) Gabriel Clemens (second round)
- (Germany) Max Hopp (third round)

Host Nation Qualifier
- (Germany) Lukas Wenig (second round)
- (Germany) Franz Rötzsch (first round)
- (Germany) Nico Kurz (second round)
- (Germany) Dragutin Horvat (second round)

Nordic & Baltic Qualifier
- (Sweden) Daniel Larsson (first round)

East European Qualifier
- (Russia) Boris Koltsov (first round)

== Draw ==
First round (best of 11 legs); 25 September
(Russia) Boris Koltsov 84.92 | 2
(Republic of Ireland) Steve Lennon 90.14 | 6
(Germany) Steffen Siepmann 78.00 | 1
(England) Mervyn King 93.70 | 6
(Germany) Franz Rötzsch 91.42 | 5
(Canada) Jeff Smith 89.03 | 6
(England) Jason Lowe 100.15 | 4
(Germany) Nico Kurz 97.57 | 6
(England) Michael Smith 95.04 | 6
(England) Alan Tabern 82.73 | 2
(England) Chris Dobey 93.97 | 6
(Scotland) Ryan Murray 92.27 | 3
(Germany) Lukas Wenig 84.59 | 6
(New Zealand) Cody Harris 80.58 | 4
(Belgium) Ronny Huybrechts 91.22 | 4
(Germany) Dragutin Horvat 94.58 | 6
(England) Reece Robinson 88.30 | 2
(Germany) Max Hopp 92.95 | 6
(Netherlands) Danny Noppert 102.57 | 6
(England) Josh Payne 92.89 | 2
(England) Steve West 86.02 | 1
(Germany) Gabriel Clemens 89.56 | 6
(England) Scott Waites 93.66 | 6
(Australia) Darren Penhall 90.35 | 3
(Netherlands) Jeffrey de Zwaan 83.75 | 3
(South Africa) Devon Petersen 94.57 | 6
(Sweden) Daniel Larsson 82.89 | 1
(Republic of Ireland) William O'Connor 97.21 | 6
(Netherlands) Ron Meulenkamp 89.23 | 5
(England) Richard North 94.93 | 6
(England) Steve Brown 86.08 | 3
(England) Adam Hunt 91.05 | 6

Second round (best of 11 legs); 26 September
1 | (Netherlands) Michael van Gerwen 99.85 | 6
(Republic of Ireland) Steve Lennon 86.69 | 2
16 | (Netherlands) Jermaine Wattimena 92.86 | 2
(England) Mervyn King 103.83 | 6
8 | (Austria) Mensur Suljović 96.27 | 6
(Canada) Jeff Smith 96.34 | 4
9 | (England) James Wade 94.60 | 6
(Germany) Nico Kurz 93.66 | 2
4 | (Scotland) Peter Wright 106.76 | 6
(England) Michael Smith 97.35 | 3
13 | (Wales) Jonny Clayton 99.95 | 6
(England) Chris Dobey 95.13 | 4
5 | (England) Dave Chisnall 108.65 | 6
(Germany) Lukas Wenig 82.37 | 0
12 | (England) Nathan Aspinall 97.46 | 6
(Germany) Dragutin Horvat 92.18 | 2
2 | (England) Ian White 89.90 | 4
(Germany) Max Hopp 90.99 | 6
15 | (England) Adrian Lewis 96.48 | 2
(Netherlands) Danny Noppert 101.20 | 6
7 | (Northern Ireland) Daryl Gurney 87.96 | 6
(Germany) Gabriel Clemens 83.62 | 1
10 | (England) Glen Durrant 96.16 | 6
(England) Scott Waites 92.63 | 3
3 | (Wales) Gerwyn Price 98.57 | 5
(South Africa) Devon Petersen 102.60 | 6
14 | (England) Rob Cross 96.53 | 6
(Republic of Ireland) William O'Connor 90.36 | 3
6 | (Poland) Krzysztof Ratajski 97.82 | 6
(England) Richard North 87.47 | 2
11 | (England) Joe Cullen 94.78 | 6
(England) Adam Hunt 91.76 | 4

Third round (best of 11 legs); 27 September
1 | (Netherlands) van Gerwen 89.61 | 1
(England) King 100.21 | 6
8 | (Austria) Suljović 96.06 | 1
9 | (England) Wade 103.21 | 6
4 | (Scotland) Wright 101.27 | 3
13 | (Wales) Clayton 95.95 | 6
5 | (England) Chisnall 102.30 | 6
12 | (England) Aspinall 98.05 | 3
(Germany) Hopp 90.74 | 4
(Netherlands) Noppert 96.91 | 6
7 | (Northern Ireland) Gurney 98.72 | 6
10 | (England) Durrant 97.14 | 4
(South Africa) Petersen 100.46 | 6
14 | (England) Cross 96.45 | 5
6 | (Poland) Ratajski 106.92 | 6
11 | (England) Cullen 96.00 | 2

Quarter-finals (best of 11 legs); 27 September
(England) King 99.78 | 6
9 | (England) Wade 87.55 | 2
13 | (Wales) Clayton 103.86 | 6
5 | (England) Chisnall 102.93 | 5
(Netherlands) Noppert 99.36 | 6
7 | (Northern Ireland) Gurney 93.55 | 2
(South Africa) Petersen 99.79 | 6
6 | (Poland) Ratajski 91.18 | 3

Semi-finals (best of 13 legs); 27 September
(England) King 90.13 | 3
13 | (Wales) Clayton 97.69 | 7
(Netherlands) Noppert 94.57 | 4
(South Africa) Petersen 100.75 | 7

Final (best of 15 legs); 27 September
13 | (Wales) Clayton 91.43 | 3
(South Africa) Petersen 102.75 | 8
