= 2026 European Darts Grand Prix =

Darts tournament

2026 Elten Safety Shoes European Darts Grand Prix

Tournament information
- Dates: 17–19 April 2026
- Venue: Glaspalast
- Location: Sindelfingen, Germany
- Organisation(s): Professional Darts Corporation (PDC)
- Format: Legs
- Prize fund: £230,000
- Winner's share: £35,000
- High checkout: 170 Nathan Aspinall

Champion(s)
- Gerwyn Price (WAL)

The 2026 European Darts Grand Prix (known for sponsorship reasons as the 2026 Elten Safety Shoes European Darts Grand Prix) was a professional darts tournament that took place at the Glaspalast in Sindelfingen, Germany, from 17 to 19 April 2026. It was the fifth of fifteen PDC European Tour events on the 2026 PDC Pro Tour. It featured a field of 48 players and £230,000 in prize money, with £35,000 going to the winner.

Gary Anderson was the defending champion, having defeated Andrew Gilding 8–0 in the 2025 final. However, he lost 6–3 to Niko Springer in the second round.

Gerwyn Price won the tournament by defeating Ross Smith 8–6 in the final, after Martin Schindler missed a match dart to beat him in the quarter-finals. He became the second player to win ten European Tour titles after Michael van Gerwen.

== Prize money ==
As part of a mass boost in prize money for Professional Darts Corporation (PDC) events in 2026, the prize fund for all 2026 European Tour events rose to £230,000, of which the winner will receive £35,000.

Stage (num. of players)		Prize money
Winner	(1)	£35,000
Runner-up	(1)	£15,000
Semi-finalists	(2)	£10,000
Quarter-finalists	(4)	£8,000
Third round losers	(8)	£5,000
Second round losers	(16)	£3,500*
First round losers	(16)	£2,000*
Total	£230,000	

- Pre-qualified players from the Orders of Merit who lose in their first match of the event shall not be credited with prize money on any Order of Merit.

== Qualification and format ==
The top 16 players on the two-year PDC Order of Merit were seeded and entered the tournament in the second round, while the next 16 highest-ranked players from the one-year PDC Pro Tour Order of Merit automatically qualified for the first round. The seedings were confirmed on 27 March. The remaining 16 places went to players from four qualifying events – 10 from the Tour Card Holder Qualifier (held on 1 April), four from the Host Nation Qualifier (held on 28 February), one from the Nordic & Baltic Associate Member Qualifier (held on 29 March), and one from the East European Associate Member Qualifier (held on 11 April).

Ryan Joyce withdrew and was replaced by Ian White.

Seeded players

1. Gian van Veen (NED) (second round)
2. Michael van Gerwen (NED) (quarter-finals)
3. Jonny Clayton (WAL) (third round)
4. James Wade (ENG) (third round)
5. Josh Rock (NIR) (third round)
6. Gerwyn Price (WAL) (champion)
7. Stephen Bunting (ENG) (third round)
8. Danny Noppert (NED) (quarter-finals)
9. Gary Anderson (SCO) (second round)
10. Ryan Searle (ENG) (second round)
11. Chris Dobey (ENG) (third round)
12. Ross Smith (ENG) (runner-up)
13. Nathan Aspinall (ENG) (quarter-finals)
14. Martin Schindler (GER) (quarter-finals)
15. Jermaine Wattimena (NED) (third round)
16. Mike De Decker (BEL) (second round)

PDC Pro Tour Order of Merit qualifiers

- Wessel Nijman (NED) (semi-finals)
- Damon Heta (AUS) (second round)
- Dirk van Duijvenbode (NED) (first round)
- Cameron Menzies (SCO) (second round)
- Niels Zonneveld (NED) (first round)
- Niko Springer (GER) (third round)
- Krzysztof Ratajski (POL) (semi-finals)
- Daryl Gurney (NIR) (first round)
- William O'Connor (IRL) (first round)
- Dave Chisnall (ENG) (second round)
- Andrew Gilding (ENG) (second round)
- Joe Cullen (ENG) (third round)
- Karel Sedláček (CZE) (first round)
- Kevin Doets (NED) (second round)
- Peter Wright (SCO) (first round)

Tour Card qualifier
- Rob Cross (ENG) (first round)
- Jurjen van der Velde (NED) (first round)
- Mickey Mansell (IRL) (second round)
- Jeffrey de Zwaan (NED) (second round)
- Kim Huybrechts (BEL) (second round)
- Raymond van Barneveld (NED) (first round)
- Oskar Lukasiak (SWE) (second round)
- Maik Kuivenhoven (NED) (first round)
- Madars Razma (LAT) (first round)
- Keane Barry (IRL) (second round)

Host Nation qualifier
- Michael Hurtz (GER) (first round)
- Paul Krohne (GER) (first round)
- Michael Unterbuchner (GER) (second round)
- Robin Masino (GER) (first round)

Nordic & Baltic qualifier
- Valters Melderis (LAT) (second round)

East European qualifier
- Petr Křivka (CZE) (first round)

Reserve list
- Ian White (ENG) (first round)

== Summary ==
=== First round ===
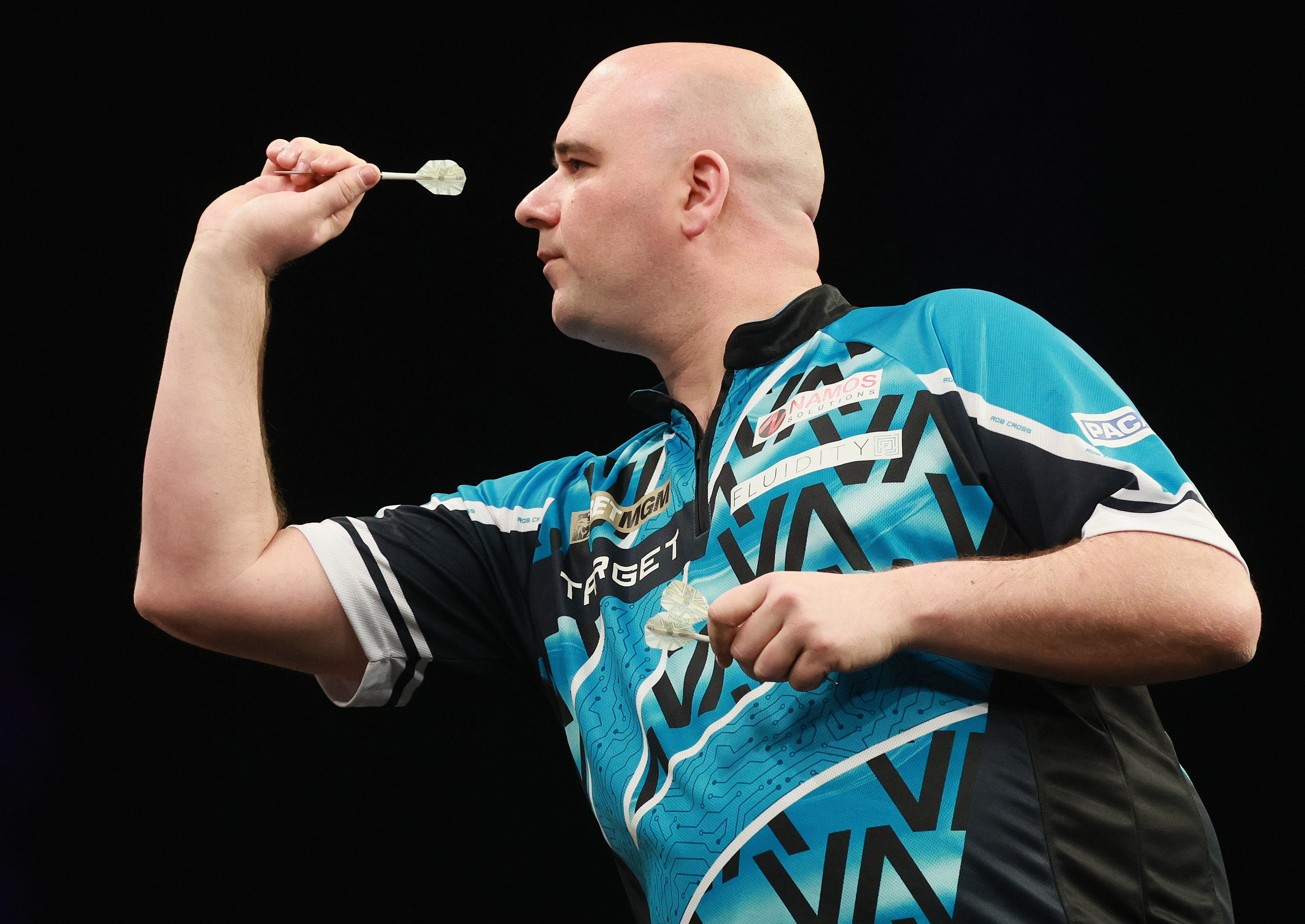
Rob Cross (pictured in 2025) was one of three former world champions to go out in the first round.

The first round (best of 11 legs) was played on 17 April. Cameron Menzies registered a three-dart average of 104.50 to defeat five-time world champion Raymond van Barneveld 6–3. "I felt tremendous there. I wish I could play like that all the time," commented Menzies, who hailed Van Barneveld as a hero of his growing up. Two other former world champions were eliminated in the first round: Peter Wright, the winner of the 2017 European Darts Grand Prix, lost 6–3 to Jeffrey de Zwaan, while 2023 champion Rob Cross was beaten 6–2 by Mickey Mansell. Host nation qualifier Michael Unterbuchner earned his second European Tour victory by defeating William O'Connor in a deciding leg; the other three host nation qualifiers—Michael Hurtz, Paul Krohne and Robin Masino—lost to Krzysztof Ratajski, Andrew Gilding, and Niko Springer, respectively.

Latvian qualifier Valters Melderis became the 600th player to compete on the European Tour as he beat Karel Sedláček 6–5; his compatriot Madars Razma lost 6–4 to Damon Heta. Wessel Nijman, who won Players Championship 10 earlier in the week, defeated 2023 champion Ian White 6–2. Oskar Lukasiak missed nine match darts before eventually sealing a 6–5 win over Daryl Gurney. Keane Barry landed checkouts of 124 and 130 on his way to defeating Niels Zonneveld 6–3.

=== Second round ===
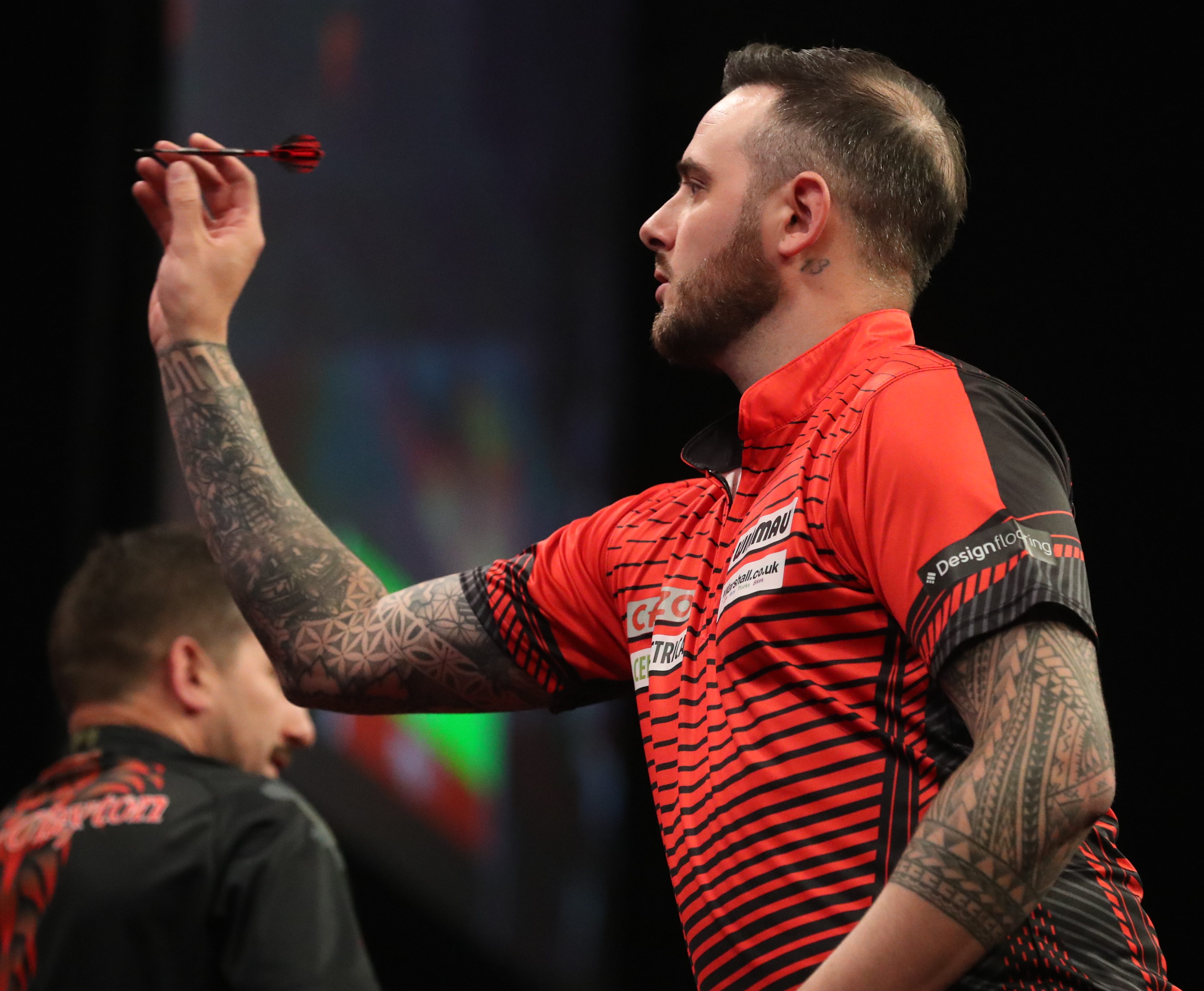
Joe Cullen (pictured in 2022) defeated the top seed Gian van Veen 6–3 in the second round.

The second round (best of 11 legs) was played on 18 April. Two-time defending champion Gary Anderson was eliminated in a 6–3 defeat to Niko Springer. Progressing to a third-round meeting with Danny Noppert after the Dutchman beat Oskar Lukasiak 6–5, Springer recounted the pair's final at the 2025 Hungarian Darts Trophy, calling Noppert a "fantastic player" who he would have to "play the same level" against the following day. Martin Schindler joined compatriot Springer in the third round by winning a deciding leg against Damon Heta. Top seed Gian van Veen was beaten 6–3 by Joe Cullen, who reached the last 16 of a European Tour event for the first time in a year. The 2016 and 2018 champion Michael van Gerwen was the only former winner of the tournament to advance to the third round, defeating Michael Unterbuchner 6–2. Following the match, Van Gerwen was critical of his opponent, stating: "He's never beaten me in his life and he will never beat me in his life. He's not good enough. Even my B-game and C-game beats him but who cares?" He added: "The day I'm going to worry myself about Unterbuchner, that's the day I'm going to quit playing darts."

Two other seeded players were eliminated in the second round alongside Van Veen and Anderson: Wessel Nijman beat tenth seed Ryan Searle 6–2 with an average of 104.12, and Krzysztof Ratajski defeated sixteenth seed Mike De Decker 6–4. Nathan Aspinall, who won the 2026 German Darts Grand Prix, began his campaign by beating Jeffrey de Zwaan 6–1, a win that included a 170 checkout. Andrew Gilding, the runner-up the previous year, lost 6–2 to Chris Dobey. Jonny Clayton averaged 106.78 on his way to defeating Valters Melderis 6–1, while James Wade averaged 104.15 to claim a 6–3 win over Kim Huybrechts, marking the end of a five-match losing streak for Wade on the European Tour. Premier League players Gerwyn Price, Josh Rock, and Stephen Bunting defeated Dave Chisnall, Keane Barry, and Mickey Mansell, respectively. Ross Smith defeated Cameron Menzies 6–3, while Jermaine Wattimena beat Kevin Doets by the same scoreline.

=== Final day ===
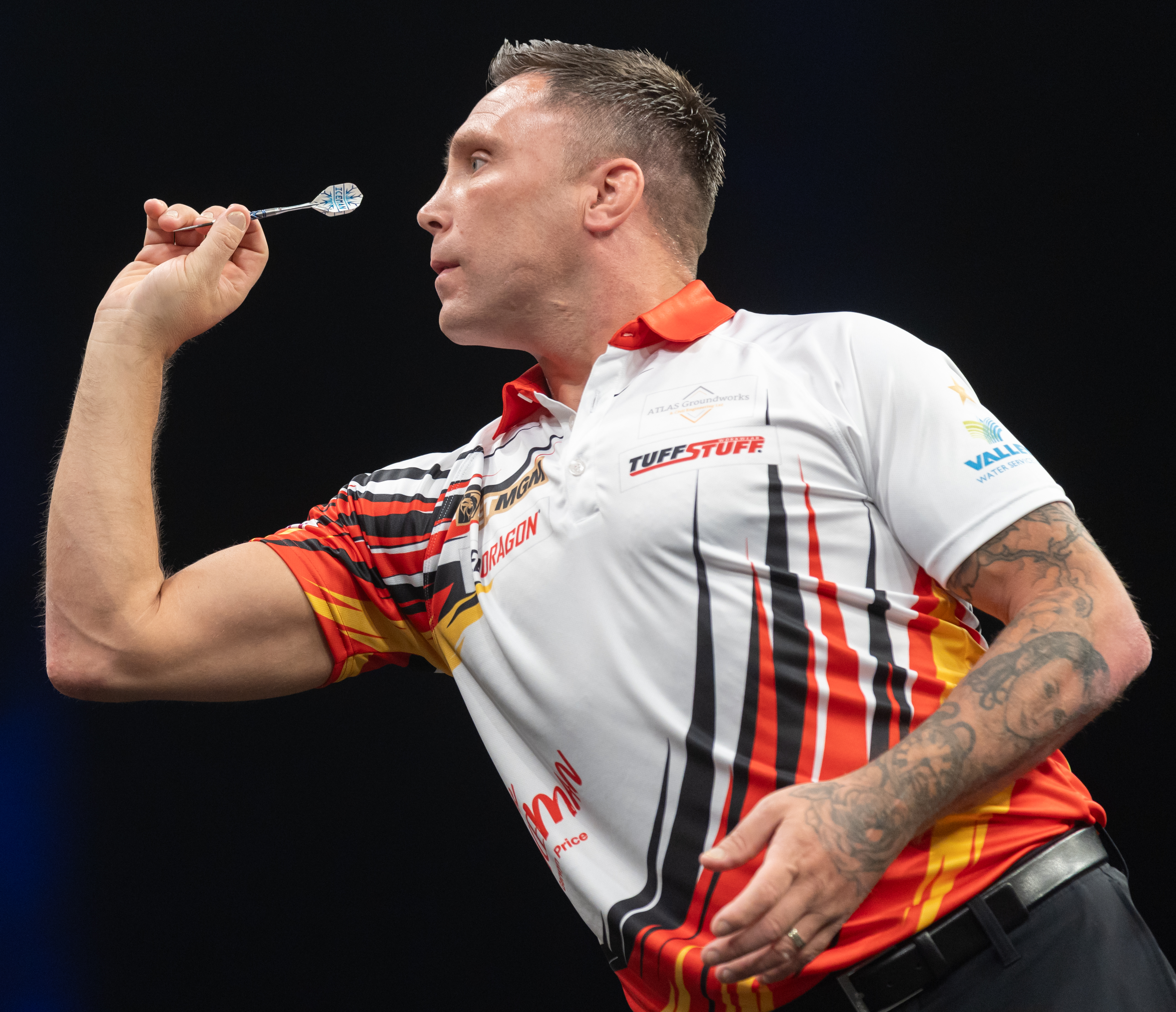
Gerwyn Price (pictured in 2026) won his tenth European Tour title, becoming the second player to achieve the feat.

The third round, quarter-finals, semi-finals and final were played on 19 April. The third round and quarter-finals were contested over the best of 11 legs, the semi-finals over the best of 13 legs, and the final over the best of 15 legs. The final day saw Ross Smith and Gerwyn Price reach the final. Smith began the day by defeating Josh Rock in a deciding leg, and advanced to the title decider following a 6–4 win against Nathan Aspinall and a 7–5 victory over Krzysztof Ratajski. Meanwhile, Price defeated Chris Dobey 6–4 before winning a deciding leg against Martin Schindler, who missed a match dart at double 5 to eliminate the Welshman. In the semi-finals, Price defeated Wessel Nijman 7–4 in a rematch of the European Darts Trophy final. Despite the loss, Nijman's run to the semi-finals resulted in him entering the top 16 of the PDC World Rankings for the first time. Smith looked to win his first European Tour title in his fourth final, while Price, competing in his second European Tour final in two appearances in 2026, aimed to win his tenth title.

Price started the final by taking a 3–0 lead, but a run of four consecutive legs from Smith that included two breaks of throw saw the Englishman go in front. Price responded with a 130 checkout to equalise at 4–4. Momentum shifted in Price's favour when Smith missed five darts at double to go 6–5 ahead, allowing Price to reclaim the lead with a break. Price kept control of the match from there and hit double 12 to complete an 8–6 victory, finishing the match with a three-dart average of 95.70.

Price won his tenth European Tour title, making him the second player to reach that mark after Michael van Gerwen, who was on 38 titles at the time of Price's victory. "We [Price and Smith] have both had great tournaments and I was just struggling to get over the winning line," admitted Price after the match. On his title milestone, he joked: "I've been in the PDC for 12 years now, so less than one a year on average isn't very good." Speaking in defeat, Smith said: "It's fine margins. You're playing the best players in the world—if you don't hit your doubles, you're going to get punished." He concluded: "It is what it is. I'll crack on with the next one."

== Draw ==
The draw was announced on 16 April. Numbers to the left of a player's name show the seedings for the top 16 in the tournament. The figures to the right of a player's name state their three-dart average in a match. The reserve player is indicated by 'Alt'. Players in bold denote match winners.

**First round** (best of 11 legs); 17 April
**Joe Cullen 87.58**	**6**
Maik Kuivenhoven 84.31	1
**Krzysztof Ratajski 90.73**	**6**
(Germany) Michael Hurtz 75.00	3
Daryl Gurney 77.80	5
**Oskar Lukasiak 82.37**	**6**
**Niko Springer 89.77**	**6**
(Germany) Robin Masino 75.95	1
Dirk van Duijvenbode 94.66	3
**Kim Huybrechts 93.84**	**6**
Peter Wright 86.89	3
**Jeffrey de Zwaan 91.54**	**6**
Niels Zonneveld 96.12	3
**Keane Barry 95.73**	**6**
**Cameron Menzies 104.50**	**6**
Raymond van Barneveld 96.05	3
William O'Connor 93.70	5
**Michael Unterbuchner 95.52**	**6**
**Kevin Doets 95.68**	**6**
Jurjen van der Velde 85.80	4
Rob Cross 92.95	2
**Mickey Mansell 100.32**	**6**
**Wessel Nijman 98.35**	**6**
Alt	Ian White 95.36	2
Karel Sedláček 92.01	5
**Valters Melderis 86.64**	**6**
**Damon Heta 95.65**	**6**
Madars Razma 90.75	4
**Dave Chisnall 95.26**	**6**
Petr Křivka 90.02	4
**Andrew Gilding 96.95**	**6**
Paul Krohne 89.66	3

**Second round** (best of 11 legs); 18 April
1	Gian van Veen 92.70	3
**Joe Cullen 91.73**	**6**
16	Mike De Decker 87.09	4
**Krzysztof Ratajski 93.30**	**6**
**8**	**Danny Noppert 84.53**	**6**
Oskar Lukasiak 86.77	5
9	Gary Anderson 90.49	3
**Niko Springer 95.44**	**6**
**4**	**James Wade 104.15**	**6**
Kim Huybrechts 93.84	3
**13**	**Nathan Aspinall 92.01**	**6**
Jeffrey de Zwaan 84.35	1
**5**	**Josh Rock 97.98**	**6**
Keane Barry 91.67	3
**12**	**Ross Smith 96.90**	**6**
Cameron Menzies 91.43	3
**2**	**Michael van Gerwen 91.37**	**6**
Michael Unterbuchner 82.95	2
**15**	**Jermaine Wattimena 98.88**	**6**
Kevin Doets 97.83	3
**7**	**Stephen Bunting 93.02**	**6**
Mickey Mansell 89.72	3
10	Ryan Searle 96.00	2
**Wessel Nijman 104.12**	**6**
**3**	**Jonny Clayton 106.78**	**6**
Valters Melderis 86.32	1
**14**	**Martin Schindler 92.11**	**6**
Damon Heta 93.31	5
**6**	**Gerwyn Price 99.41**	**6**
Dave Chisnall 91.39	4
**11**	**Chris Dobey 98.18**	**6**
Andrew Gilding 94.12	2

**Third round** (best of 11 legs); 19 April
Cullen 86.93	2
**Ratajski 90.70**	**6**
**8**	**Noppert 98.34**	**6**
Springer 87.58	4
4	Wade 103.08	3
**13**	**Aspinall 106.20**	**6**
5	Rock 95.87	5
**12**	**Smith 98.64**	**6**
**2**	**van Gerwen 88.61**	**6**
15	Wattimena 85.48	5
7	Bunting 90.02	3
**Nijman 87.62**	**6**
3	Clayton 94.03	1
**14**	**Schindler 100.98**	**6**
**6**	**Price 105.96**	**6**
11	Dobey 99.31	4

**Quarter-finals** (best of 11 legs); 19 April
**Ratajski 90.94**	**6**
8	Noppert 90.51	5
13	Aspinall 90.24	4
**12**	**Smith 93.44**	**6**
2	van Gerwen 82.57	2
**Nijman 89.77**	**6**
14	Schindler 96.43	5
**6**	**Price 100.95**	**6**

**Semi-finals** (best of 13 legs); 19 April
Ratajski 95.55	5
**12**	**Smith 90.58**	**7**
Nijman 96.91	4
**6**	**Price 98.96**	**7**

**Final** (best of 15 legs); 19 April
12	Smith 96.25	6
**6**	**Price 95.70**	**8**
