= 2026 German Darts Grand Prix =

Darts tournament

2026 Elten Safety Shoes German Darts Grand Prix

Tournament information
- Dates: 4–6 April 2026
- Venue: Kulturhalle Zenith
- Location: Munich, Germany
- Organisation(s): Professional Darts Corporation (PDC)
- Format: Legs
- Prize fund: £230,000
- Winner's share: £35,000
- High checkout: 170; Kevin Doets (×2); William O'Connor

Champion(s)
- Nathan Aspinall (ENG)

The 2026 German Darts Grand Prix (known for sponsorship reasons as the 2026 Elten Safety Shoes German Darts Grand Prix) was a professional darts tournament that took place at the Kulturhalle Zenith in Munich, Germany, from 4 to 6 April 2026. It was the fourth of fifteen PDC European Tour events on the 2026 PDC Pro Tour. It featured a field of 48 players and £230,000 in prize money, with £35,000 going to the winner.

Michael van Gerwen was the defending champion, having defeated Gian van Veen 8–5 in the 2025 final. However, he lost 6–1 to Niko Springer in the second round.

Nathan Aspinall won the tournament, his fourth European Tour title, by defeating Danny Noppert 8–5 in the final.

== Prize money ==
As part of a mass boost in prize money for Professional Darts Corporation (PDC) events in 2026, the prize fund for all 2026 European Tour events rose to £230,000, of which the winner will receive £35,000.

Stage (num. of players)		Prize money
Winner	(1)	£35,000
Runner-up	(1)	£15,000
Semi-finalists	(2)	£10,000
Quarter-finalists	(4)	£8,000
Third round losers	(8)	£5,000
Second round losers	(16)	£3,500*
First round losers	(16)	£2,000*
Total	£230,000	

- Pre-qualified players from the Orders of Merit who lose in their first match of the event shall not be credited with prize money on any Order of Merit.

== Qualification and format ==
The top 16 players on the two-year PDC Order of Merit were seeded and entered the tournament in the second round, while the next 16 highest-ranked players from the one-year PDC Pro Tour Order of Merit automatically qualified for the first round. The seedings were confirmed on 12 February. The remaining 16 places went to players from four qualifying events – 10 from the Tour Card Holder Qualifier (held on 18 February), four from the Host Nation Qualifier (held on 28 February), one from the Nordic & Baltic Associate Member Qualifier (held on 28 March), and one from the East European Associate Member Qualifier (held on 25 January).

Gary Anderson, Gerwyn Price, Luke Humphries and Chris Dobey withdrew and were replaced by Andrew Gilding, Karel Sedláček, Ian White and Cor Dekker. Mike De Decker, Luke Woodhouse, Dave Chisnall and Daryl Gurney moved up to become the 13th, 14th, 15th and 16th seeds respectively.

Seeded players

1. Gian van Veen (NED) (second round)
2. Michael van Gerwen (NED) (second round)
3. Jonny Clayton (WAL) (quarter-finals)
4. James Wade (ENG) (second round)
5. Josh Rock (NIR) (third round)
6. Danny Noppert (NED) (runner-up)
7. Ryan Searle (ENG) (second round)
8. Nathan Aspinall (ENG) (champion)
9. Martin Schindler (GER) (third round)
10. Ross Smith (ENG) (third round)
11. Damon Heta (AUS) (second round)
12. Jermaine Wattimena (NED) (second round)
13. Mike De Decker (BEL) (second round)
14. Luke Woodhouse (ENG) (second round)
15. Dave Chisnall (ENG) (second round)
16. Daryl Gurney (NIR) (second round)

PDC Pro Tour Order of Merit qualifiers
- Wessel Nijman (NED) (first round)
- Cameron Menzies (SCO) (first round)
- Dirk van Duijvenbode (NED) (third round)
- William O'Connor (IRL) (third round)
- Niko Springer (GER) (third round)
- Ryan Joyce (ENG) (second round)
- Krzysztof Ratajski (POL) (semi-finals)
- Joe Cullen (ENG) (first round)
- Niels Zonneveld (NED) (quarter-finals)
- Raymond van Barneveld (NED) (first round)
- Ricardo Pietreczko (GER) (second round)
- Peter Wright (SCO) (first round)

Tour Card qualifier
- Stephen Burton (ENG) (first round)
- Thomas Lovely (ENG) (first round)
- Ritchie Edhouse (ENG) (second round)
- James Hurrell (ENG) (first round)
- Michael Smith (ENG) (quarter-finals)
- Kevin Doets (NED) (semi-finals)
- Adam Lipscombe (ENG) (first round)
- Brendan Dolan (IRL) (second round)
- Kim Huybrechts (BEL) (third round)
- Sebastian Białecki (POL) (first round)
Host Nation qualifier
- Jan Schmidt (GER) (first round)
- Marcel Hausotter (GER) (second round)
- Kevin Troppmann (GER) (first round)
- Finn Behrens (GER) (first round)
Nordic & Baltic qualifier
- Anton Östlund (SWE) (first round)
East European qualifier
- Patrik Kovács (HUN) (second round)
Reserve list
- Andrew Gilding (ENG) (quarter-finals)
- Ian White (ENG) (first round)
- Karel Sedláček (CZE) (third round)
- Cor Dekker (NOR) (first round)

== Summary ==
=== First round ===
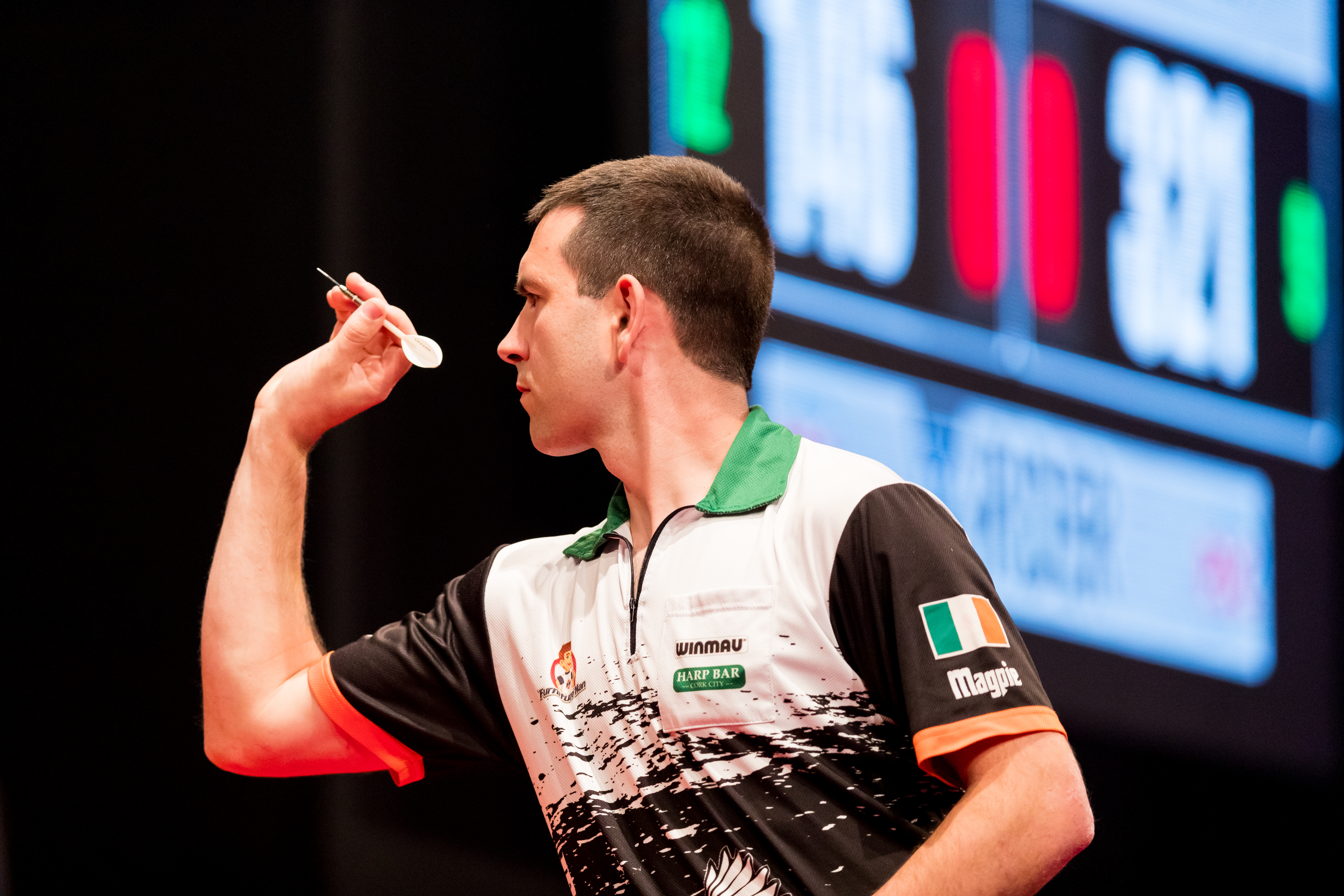
William O'Connor (pictured in 2019) hit a 170 checkout to complete a 6–2 victory over Sebastian Białecki.

The first round (best of 11 legs) was played on 4 April. Hungarian qualifier Patrik Kovács earned his first European Tour victory in his eighth appearance, defeating Joe Cullen 6–3 to become the first Hungarian player to win a match on the European Tour outside of Hungary. Speaking after the match, Kovács conceded that Cullen failed to play his best game, but expressed that it was his "dream to win a game here". Host nation qualifier Marcel Hausotter also claimed his first win by beating five-time world champion Raymond van Barneveld 6–4, twelve years after his first European Tour appearance at the 2014 German Darts Masters. The other three host nation qualifiers—Finn Behrens, Kevin Troppmann, and Jan Schmidt—lost to Ryan Joyce, Ritchie Edhouse, and Niko Springer, respectively.

Wessel Nijman, the winner of the 2026 European Darts Trophy, suffered his second successive first-round defeat on the European Tour as he lost 6–4 to Andrew Gilding, who won the match with a 140 checkout. The 2023 world champion Michael Smith defeated James Hurrell 6–2, while two-time world champion Peter Wright was beaten 6–3 by Kim Huybrechts, who competed in his 200th European Tour match. William O'Connor landed a 170 checkout to complete a 6–2 victory over Sebastian Białecki, while Kevin Doets hit a 170 finish of his own during his whitewash win against Anton Östlund. Ricardo Pietreczko and Brendan Dolan both progressed to the next round by winning deciding legs, with the latter surviving missed match darts from Cor Dekker.

=== Second round ===
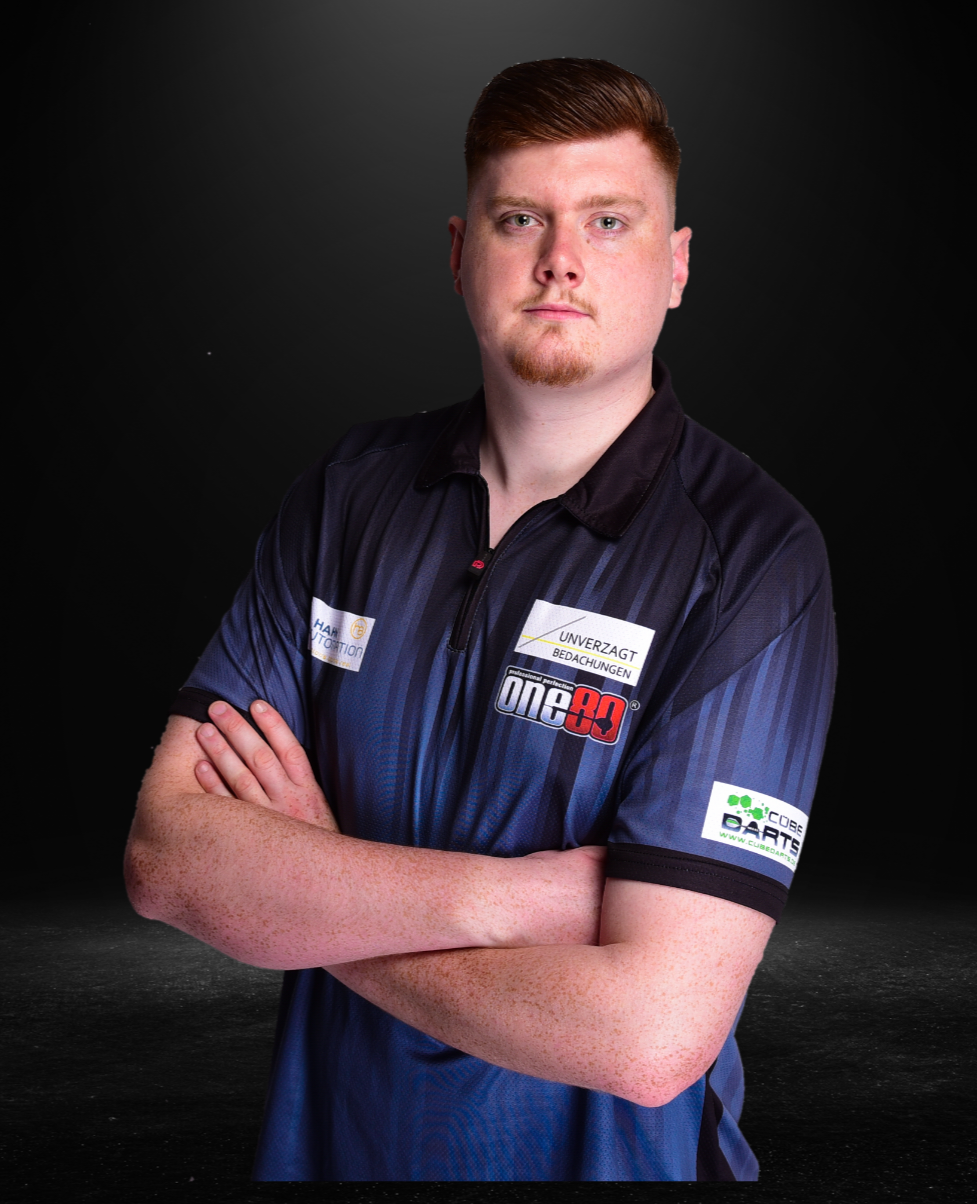
Niko Springer (pictured in 2022) eliminated the defending champion Michael van Gerwen in the second round.

The second round (best of 11 legs) was played on 5 April. Defending champion and second seed Michael van Gerwen, a four-time German Darts Grand Prix winner, was eliminated in his opening match, going 4–0 behind before losing 6–1 to Niko Springer. Registering a three-dart average over 98, Springer commented: "I know I have to play on the same level tomorrow as I did today or maybe a bit better, but I will be ready." The top seed and 2025 runner-up Gian van Veen was also beaten 6–2 by William O'Connor, who won the match with a 108 checkout. Competing in his 100th European Tour event, fourth seed James Wade took a 5–3 lead against Kevin Doets, but Doets hit his second 170 checkout of the tournament on his way to completing a 6–5 comeback victory. Kim Huybrechts was the first player of the tournament to average over 100, doing so in his 6–1 win over the fourteenth seed Luke Woodhouse. Huybrechts' Belgian compatriot, the thirteenth seed Mike De Decker, missed two match darts as he lost 6–5 to Dirk van Duijvenbode.

Krzysztof Ratajski, Michael Smith, and Andrew Gilding all won in deciding legs, eliminating the seventh seed Ryan Searle, the fifteenth seed Dave Chisnall, and the sixteenth seed Daryl Gurney, respectively. Karel Sedláček defeated the eleventh seed Damon Heta, and Niels Zonneveld beat the twelfth seed Jermaine Wattimena 6–1. In all, 10 of the tournament's 16 seeded players were eliminated in the second round. Marcel Hausotter was unable to claim another upset victory, losing 6–5 to Jonny Clayton. Nathan Aspinall and Danny Noppert won by the same scoreline to eliminate Ricardo Pietreczko and Ritchie Edhouse, contributing to half of the second round's matches going to a deciding leg; Pietreczko missed a match dart at the bullseye to defeat Aspinall. Ryan Joyce averaged 103.24 but was beaten 6–4 by Josh Rock. Ross Smith defeated Patrik Kovács 6–2, while Martin Schindler earned a 6–4 win over Brendan Dolan.

=== Final day ===
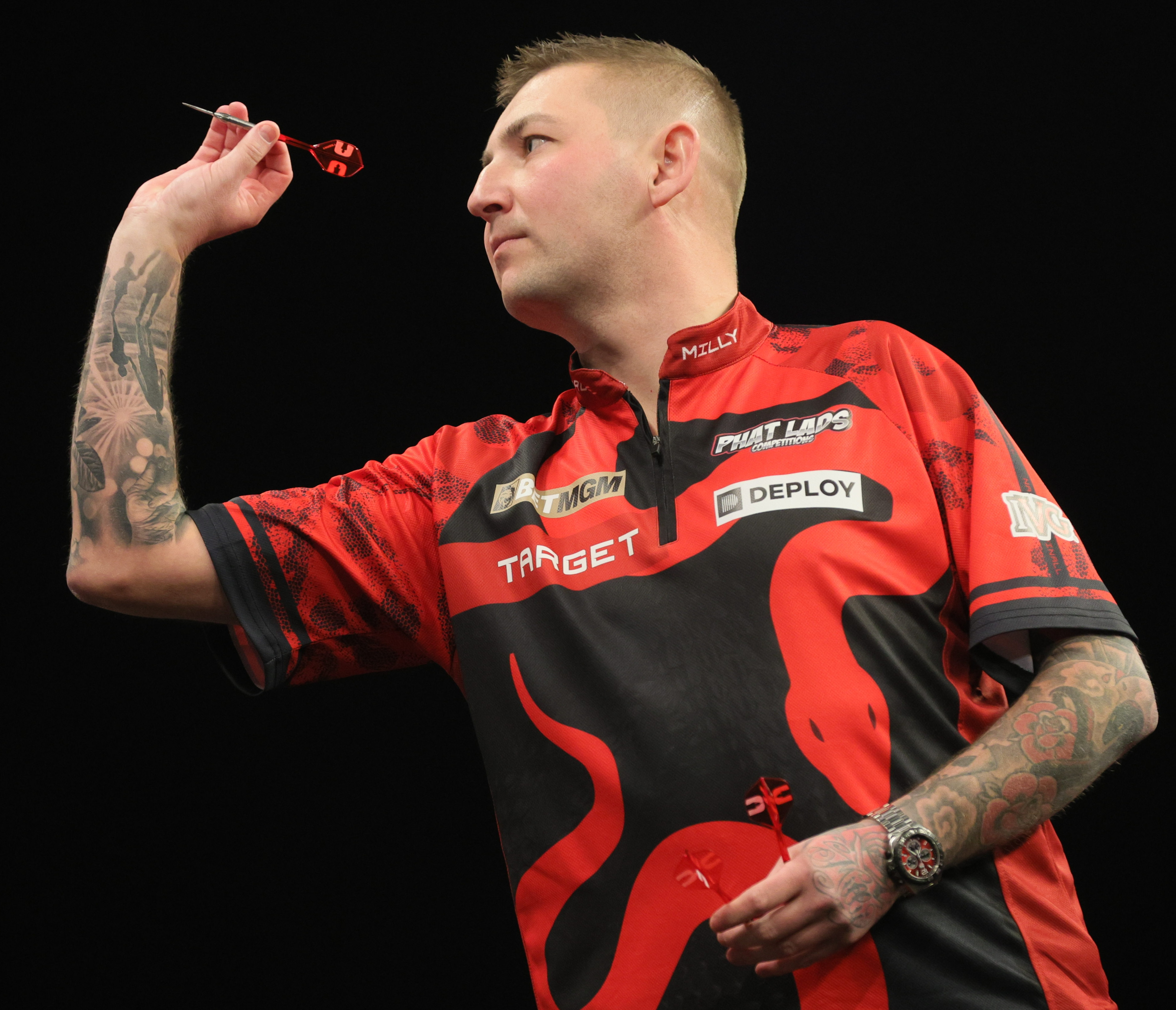
Nathan Aspinall (pictured in 2025) won his fourth European Tour title.

The third round, quarter-finals, semi-finals and final were played on 6 April. The third round and quarter-finals were contested over the best of 11 legs, the semi-finals over the best of 13 legs, and the final over the best of 15 legs. The final day saw Nathan Aspinall and Danny Noppert reach the final. Aspinall won six straight legs to defeat Martin Schindler 6–2 in the third round, followed by a 6–4 victory over Andrew Gilding. In the semi-finals, he averaged 106.40 as he beat Kevin Doets 7–2, ending a streak of six losses against the Dutchman. Doets had previously equalled the European Tour record for the most maximums in a single match, scoring ten during his third-round victory over Dirk van Duijvenbode. Meanwhile, Noppert reached the final by defeating Karel Sedláček, Jonny Clayton, and Krzysztof Ratajski, only conceding five legs throughout the three matches. Aspinall looked to add to his three titles on the 2025 European Tour, while Noppert aimed to win his first European Tour title in his fourth final.

Noppert won the opening leg of the match, but fell 4–1 behind after a 108 checkout from Aspinall. Noppert then claimed the next four legs to lead 5–4, capitalising on missed doubles from his opponent. At 5–5, Noppert missed a dart at the bullseye for a 170 checkout, allowing Aspinall to take out 84 to retake the lead. After taking the next leg, Aspinall converted a 128 checkout to win the final 8–5, ending the match with a three-dart average of 100.35 and seven maximums.

Aspinall won his fourth European Tour title with all four coming in Germany, equalling the tally of Phil Taylor. In his post-match interview, Aspinall said he was "absolutely buzzing" with the victory, adding: "I did an interview on Saturday saying I was trying to find that love for the game again, but this crowd in Munich gave me the love for darts again." Noppert called his opponent the "deserved winner". "Of course I wanted to lift the title. There is another level I can go to, and I am pushing myself hard every time."

== Draw ==
The draw was announced on 3 April. Numbers to the left of a player's name show the seedings for the top 16 in the tournament. The figures to the right of a player's name state their three-dart average in a match. The four reserve players are indicated by 'Alt'. Players in bold denote match winners.

**First round** (best of 11 legs); 4 April
**William O'Connor 94.06**	**6**
Sebastian Białecki 91.82	2
Wessel Nijman 91.25	4
**Alt**	**Andrew Gilding 91.63**	**6**
**Ricardo Pietreczko 79.19**	**6**
Alt	Ian White 83.98	5
**Brendan Dolan 79.55**	**6**
Alt	Cor Dekker 91.95	5
**Kevin Doets 92.02**	**6**
Anton Östlund 71.97	0
**Dirk van Duijvenbode 91.15**	**6**
Stephen Burton 83.55	2
**Ryan Joyce 93.40**	**6**
Finn Behrens 79.89	1
**Niels Zonneveld 93.58**	**6**
Adam Lipscombe 89.49	3
**Niko Springer 85.58**	**6**
(Germany) Jan Schmidt 79.64	5
**Michael Smith 86.40**	**6**
James Hurrell 76.22	2
**Krzysztof Ratajski 91.52**	**6**
Thomas Lovely 86.28	3
Joe Cullen 82.40	3
**Patrik Kovács 85.54**	**6**
Raymond van Barneveld 84.52	4
**Marcel Hausotter 88.13**	**6**
Peter Wright 85.01	3
**Kim Huybrechts 93.46**	**6**
**Ritchie Edhouse 95.27**	**6**
Kevin Troppmann 92.73	3
Cameron Menzies 87.55	4
**Alt**	**Karel Sedláček 91.18**	**6**

**Second round** (best of 11 legs); 5 April
1	Gian van Veen 91.00	2
**William O'Connor 89.15**	**6**
16	Daryl Gurney 92.46	5
**Alt**	**Andrew Gilding 95.50**	**6**
**8**	**Nathan Aspinall 99.50**	**6**
Ricardo Pietreczko 91.31	5
**9**	**Martin Schindler 87.20**	**6**
Brendan Dolan 83.71	4
4	James Wade 93.31	5
**Kevin Doets 101.30**	**6**
13	Mike De Decker 98.29	5
**Dirk van Duijvenbode 97.57**	**6**
**5**	**Josh Rock 102.57**	**6**
Ryan Joyce 103.24	4
12	Jermaine Wattimena 91.42	1
**Niels Zonneveld 95.32**	**6**
2	Michael van Gerwen 94.56	1
**Niko Springer 98.34**	**6**
15	Dave Chisnall 87.33	5
**Michael Smith 90.90**	**6**
7	Ryan Searle 89.46	5
**Krzysztof Ratajski 98.85**	**6**
**10**	**Ross Smith 92.32**	**6**
Patrik Kovács 88.59	2
**3**	**Jonny Clayton 94.21**	**6**
Marcel Hausotter 93.16	5
14	Luke Woodhouse 94.48	1
**Kim Huybrechts 100.26**	**6**
**6**	**Danny Noppert 99.41**	**6**
Ritchie Edhouse 96.78	5
11	Damon Heta 93.38	2
**Alt**	**Karel Sedláček 96.38**	**6**

**Third round** (best of 11 legs); 6 April
O'Connor 84.80	1
**Alt**	**Gilding 95.80**	**6**
**8**	**Aspinall 95.46**	**6**
9	Schindler 83.04	2
**Doets 107.70**	**6**
van Duijvenbode 96.77	5
5	Rock 93.14	5
**Zonneveld 103.59**	**6**
Springer 87.38	4
**M Smith 91.68**	**6**
**Ratajski 98.80**	**6**
10	R Smith 89.68	4
**3**	**Clayton 104.78**	**6**
Huybrechts 101.15	4
**6**	**Noppert 96.66**	**6**
Alt	Sedláček 87.85	2

**Quarter-finals** (best of 11 legs); 6 April
Alt	Gilding 83.45	4
**8**	**Aspinall 99.18**	**6**
**Doets 90.72**	**6**
Zonneveld 90.73	5
M Smith 85.94	2
**Ratajski 92.81**	**6**
3	Clayton 89.65	1
**6**	**Noppert 91.24**	**6**

**Semi-finals** (best of 13 legs); 6 April
**8**	**Aspinall 106.40**	**7**
Doets 93.15	2
Ratajski 98.28	2
**6**	**Noppert 96.93**	**7**

**Final** (best of 15 legs); 6 April
**8**	**Aspinall 100.35**	**8**
6	Noppert 93.16	5
