= 2026 European Darts Trophy =

Darts tournament

2026 Elten Safety Shoes European Darts Trophy

Tournament information
- Dates: 13–15 March 2026
- Venue: Lokhalle
- Location: Göttingen, Germany
- Organisation(s): Professional Darts Corporation (PDC)
- Format: Legs
- Prize fund: £230,000
- Winner's share: £35,000
- High checkout: 150 Wessel Nijman

Champion(s)
- Wessel Nijman (NED)

The 2026 European Darts Trophy (known for sponsorship reasons as the 2026 Elten Safety Shoes European Darts Trophy) was a professional darts tournament that took place at the Lokhalle in Göttingen, Germany, from 13 to 15 March 2026. It was the second of fifteen PDC European Tour events on the 2026 PDC Pro Tour. It featured a field of 48 players and £230,000 in prize money, with £35,000 going to the winner.

Nathan Aspinall won the 2025 edition, having defeated Ryan Joyce 8–4 in the final. However, Aspinall did not enter the tournament, and therefore did not defend his title.

Wessel Nijman won his first European Tour title, defeating Gerwyn Price 8–3 in final.

== Prize money ==
As part of a mass boost in prize money for Professional Darts Corporation (PDC) events in 2026, the prize fund for all 2026 European Tour events rose to £230,000, of which the winner received £35,000.

Stage (num. of players)		Prize money
Winner	(1)	£35,000
Runner-up	(1)	£15,000
Semi-finalists	(2)	£10,000
Quarter-finalists	(4)	£8,000
Third round losers	(8)	£5,000
Second round losers	(16)	£3,500*
First round losers	(16)	£2,000*
Total	£230,000	

- Pre-qualified players from the Orders of Merit who lose in their first match of the event shall not be credited with prize money on any Order of Merit.

== Qualification and format ==
The top 16 players on the two-year PDC Order of Merit were seeded and entered the tournament in the second round, while the next 16 highest-ranked players from the one-year PDC Pro Tour Order of Merit automatically qualified for the first round. World number one and back-to-back world champion Luke Littler did not participate, having not entered a European Tour event in Germany since the German Darts Grand Prix in April 2025. The seedings were confirmed on 5 February. The remaining 16 places went to players from four qualifying events – 10 from the Tour Card Holder Qualifier (held on 11 February), four from the Host Nation Qualifier (held on 28 February), one from the Nordic & Baltic Associate Member Qualifier (held on 6 February), and one from the East European Associate Member Qualifier (held on 24 January).

Gary Anderson, James Wade and Nathan Aspinall withdrew and were replaced by Mensur Suljović, Keane Barry and Lukas Wenig. Jermaine Wattimena, Mike De Decker and Rob Cross moved up to become the 14th, 15th and 16th seeds respectively. After the draw was made, Luke Humphries and Jonny Clayton withdrew from the tournament. Karel Sedláček and Cam Crabtree replaced them from the reserve list, going straight in at the second-round stage.

Seeded players

1. ~~Luke Humphries (ENG)~~ (withdrew)
2. Gian van Veen (NED) (third round)
3. Michael van Gerwen (NED) (second round)
4. ~~Jonny Clayton (WAL)~~ (withdrew)
5. Stephen Bunting (ENG) (second round)
6. Ryan Searle (ENG) (third round)
7. Josh Rock (NIR) (quarter-finals)
8. Danny Noppert (NED) (third round)
9. Gerwyn Price (WAL) (runner-up)
10. Chris Dobey (ENG) (third round)
11. Martin Schindler (GER) (second round)
12. Ross Smith (ENG) (third round)
13. Damon Heta (AUS) (semi-finals)
14. Jermaine Wattimena (NED) (third round)
15. Mike De Decker (BEL) (second round)
16. Rob Cross (ENG) (second round)

PDC Pro Tour Order of Merit qualifiers

- Wessel Nijman (NED) (champion)
- Cameron Menzies (SCO) (first round)
- Dirk van Duijvenbode (NED) (quarter-finals)
- Luke Woodhouse (ENG) (second round)
- Niko Springer (GER) (quarter-finals)
- Ryan Joyce (ENG) (first round)
- William O'Connor (IRL) (first round)
- Joe Cullen (ENG) (second round)
- Krzysztof Ratajski (POL) (second round)
- Dave Chisnall (ENG) (second round)
- Niels Zonneveld (NED) (semi-finals)
- Daryl Gurney (NIR) (second round)
- Andrew Gilding (ENG) (first round)

Tour Card qualifier
- Mario Vandenbogaerde (BEL) (first round)
- Cristo Reyes (ESP) (first round)
- Darius Labanauskas (LTU) (second round)
- Kai Gotthardt (GER) (first round)
- Jeffrey de Zwaan (NED) (first round)
- Shane McGuirk (IRL) (first round)
- Kevin Doets (NED) (third round)
- Richard Veenstra (NED) (quarter-finals)
- Ricky Evans (ENG) (second round)
- Sebastian Białecki (POL) (first round)
Host Nation qualifier
- Florian Preis (GER) (first round)
- Florian Hempel (GER) (first round)
- Dragutin Horvat (GER) (first round)
- Paul Krohne (GER) (second round)
Nordic & Baltic qualifier
- Jonas Masalin (FIN) (first round)
East European qualifier
- Wojciech Bruliński (POL) (first round)
Reserve list
- Mensur Suljović (AUT) (third round)
- Keane Barry (IRL) (first round)
- Lukas Wenig (GER) (second round)
- Karel Sedláček (CZE) (second round)
- Cam Crabtree (ENG) (second round)

== Summary ==
=== First round ===
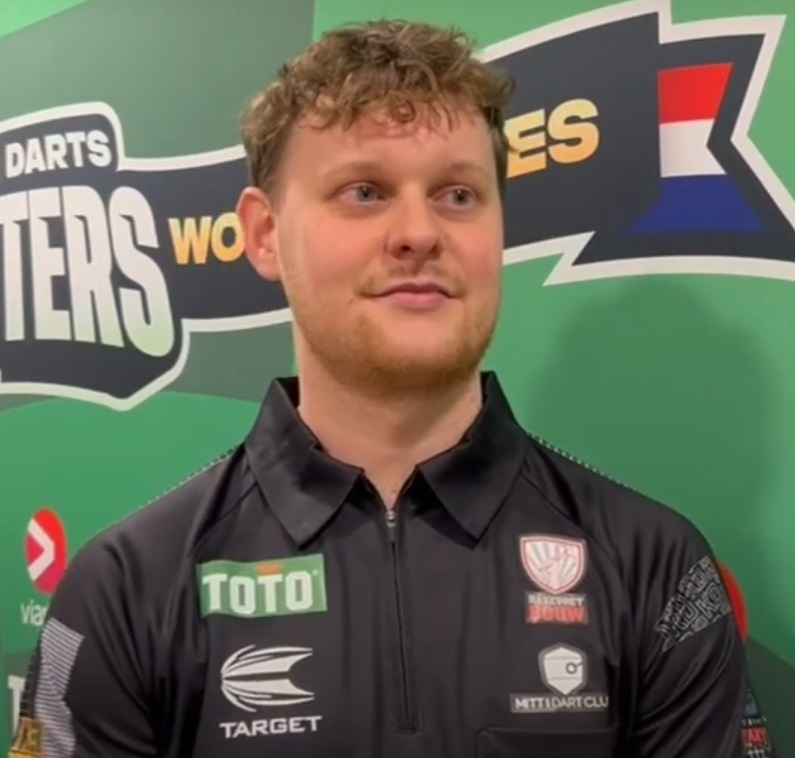
Kevin Doets (pictured in 2024) defeated Jonas Masalin 6–0 with a three-dart average of 117.12, the highest in tournament history and the joint-fifth highest in European Tour history.

The first round (best of 11 legs) was played on 13 March. Kevin Doets recorded a career-high three-dart average of 117.12 in a whitewash win over Finnish debutant Jonas Masalin. Surpassing Michael van Gerwen's 115.13 mark in 2016 as the highest average in the tournament's history, it was also the joint-fifth highest average in European Tour history. Speaking after the match, Doets stated that he "started to feel comfortable" after Masalin missed darts to level the match at 1–1. "I’m in a really good place right now, I’m very confident, and I think I’m going to win tomorrow as well," he added. Eight-time European Tour winner Dave Chisnall trailed Jeffrey de Zwaan 5–0 but won the next six legs to complete a 6–5 comeback victory, surviving three missed match darts from De Zwaan. "It was a weird game," said Chisnall afterwards. "That last leg was a bit weird, we both didn’t score well. But I took the finish, and I’m happy." Host nation qualifier Paul Krohne earned his first win on the European Tour by defeating Cameron Menzies 6–4. The other host nation qualifiers were unsuccessful: Dragutin Horvat and Florian Preis were whitewashed by Luke Woodhouse and Ricky Evans, respectively, while Florian Hempel lost 6–3 to Richard Veenstra. Ryan Joyce, the runner-up the previous year, lost 6–3 to Lukas Wenig.

Wessel Nijman overturned a 3–0 deficit to defeat Cristo Reyes in a deciding leg. In another last-leg decider, Niko Springer landed checkouts of 142 and 124 as he beat German compatriot Kai Gotthardt, avenging his loss to Gotthardt in the third round of the UK Open. Joe Cullen earned a 6–3 victory against Polish debutant Wojciech Bruliński after initially going 2–0 behind. Shane McGuirk, another European Tour debutant, lost 6–4 to Krzysztof Ratajski. Dirk van Duijvenbode and Mensur Suljović were 6–2 winners over Mario Vandenbogaerde and William O'Connor, respectively. Niels Zonneveld set up a meeting with three-time European Darts Trophy champion Van Gerwen in the second round by defeating Keane Barry 6–1.

=== Second round ===
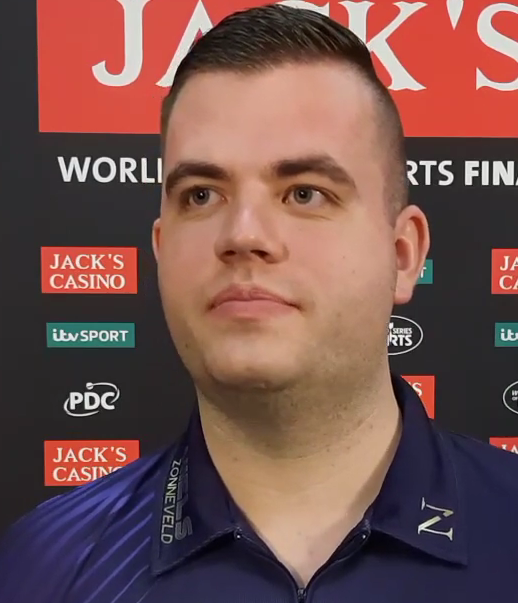
Niels Zonneveld (pictured in 2021) eliminated three-time champion Michael van Gerwen in the second round.

The second round (best of 11 legs) was played on 14 March. Despite third seed Michael van Gerwen averaging 107, Niels Zonneveld eliminated the three-time champion in a 6–2 victory, averaging 104.46 himself. Gerwyn Price began his campaign by defeating Joe Cullen 6–2 with an average of 106.70. "If I can build on that and get better, I think this tournament is mine," said Price afterwards. Niko Springer achieved another deciding-leg win, beating fifth seed Stephen Bunting 6–5 in a match marred by whistling from the Göttingen crowd, which resulted in referee Huw Ware warning the crowd about their behaviour. Springer was the only German player to reach the third round, following the eliminations of Paul Krohne, Lukas Wenig, and eleventh seed Martin Schindler. Karel Sedláček and Cam Crabtree entered the second round as replacements for Luke Humphries and Jonny Clayton. Crabtree, who flew from Washington D.C. to participate, was beaten 6–4 by Kevin Doets, while Sedláček lost to Mensur Suljović by the same scoreline.

Fifteenth seed Mike De Decker and sixteenth seed Rob Cross were beaten by Wessel Nijman and Dirk van Duijvenbode, respectively. The 2025 European Championship winner Gian van Veen defeated Krzysztof Ratajski 6–1, while Dutch compatriot Danny Noppert beat Ricky Evans by the same scoreline. Damon Heta averaged 101.42 as he defeated Darius Labanauskas 6–3. Ross Smith beat Dave Chisnall 6–4, Chris Dobey defeated Luke Woodhouse 6–1, and Ryan Searle earned a 6–3 victory over Daryl Gurney. A total of eight Dutch players reached the last 16.

=== Final day ===
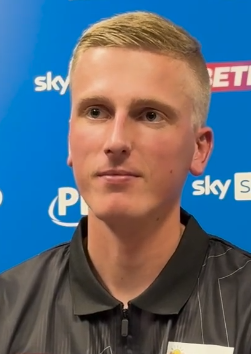
Wessel Nijman (pictured in 2025) won his maiden European Tour title in his first final.

The third round, quarter-finals, semi-finals and final were played on 15 March. The third round and quarter-finals were contested over the best of 11 legs, the semi-finals over the best of 13 legs, and the final over the best of 15 legs. The final day saw Gerwyn Price and Wessel Nijman reach the final. Danny Noppert missed a match dart to eliminate Price in the third round, allowing the Welshman to take a 6–5 victory. He then defeated Dirk van Duijvenbode 6–3 and Damon Heta 7–5 to secure his place in the final. Nijman achieved his highest three-dart average on stage in his third-round meeting with Gian van Veen, averaging 112.87 on his way to a 6–1 win. He followed that with a 106.05 average to defeat Josh Rock 6–2, missing double 12 for a nine-dart finish in the third leg of the match, and proceeded to average 110.41 in his 7–1 victory over Niels Zonneveld in the semi-finals. Elsewhere, Richard Veenstra reached his first European Tour quarter-final, losing 6–2 to Zonneveld. In the final, Price looked to become the second player to win ten European Tour titles, after Michael van Gerwen, while Nijman was pursuing his maiden European Tour title in his first final. The pair had met in the second Players Championship final of 2026, where Nijman won 8–7.

Nijman opened the final with a 116 checkout to win the first leg, soon taking a 3–0 lead. At 3–1, Price missed double 18 for a 156 checkout to find a break of throw, which Nijman capitalised on to extend his advantage to 4–1. He then converted checkouts of 97 and 145 to lead 6–1. Following Price's second leg of the match, Nijman completed the next leg in 11 darts to move one away from victory. He secured an 8–3 win with a 150 finish on double 18, finishing the match with a three-dart average of 100.80, hitting 73 per cent of his attempts at double.

Nijman won the European Darts Trophy, the first European Tour title of his career. His 100.80 average in the final completed a run of five consecutive averages above the 100 mark. Winning the £35,000 top prize, he entered the world's top 20 on the PDC Order of Merit. "I think there are no words to describe how I'm feeling right now," commented Nijman after the victory. He added that he "needed to prove to other people that [he] can play like this on the big stage", and said that winning the title was a "big step" towards his goal of reaching the world's top 16, ensuring his seeding status at major tournaments. Speaking in defeat, Price believed he "ran out of gas in the end". He concluded: "Every time I play against Wessel, he plays brilliantly against me. He's been brilliant all year, he played fantastic darts today, but I will get my own back one day."

== Draw ==
The draw was announced on 12 March. Numbers to the left of a player's name show the seedings for the top 16 in the tournament. The figures to the right of a player's name state their three-dart average in a match. The five reserve players are indicated by 'Alt'. Players in bold denote match winners.

**First round** (best of 11 legs); 13 March
William O'Connor 89.26	2
**Alt**	**Mensur Suljović 94.85**	**6**
**Dirk van Duijvenbode 85.83**	**6**
Mario Vandenbogaerde 80.64	2
**Ricky Evans 88.41**	**6**
Florian Preis 83.44	0
**Joe Cullen 95.27**	**6**
Wojciech Bruliński 84.57	3
**Kevin Doets 117.12**	**6**
Jonas Masalin 75.50	0
Andrew Gilding 94.49	3
**Darius Labanauskas 98.16**	**6**
**Niko Springer 87.19**	**6**
Kai Gotthardt 89.65	5
**Dave Chisnall 86.78**	**6**
Jeffrey de Zwaan 90.37	5
**Krzysztof Ratajski 97.86**	**6**
Shane McGuirk 96.27	4
**Wessel Nijman 91.11**	**6**
Cristo Reyes 84.36	5
Cameron Menzies 93.52	4
**Paul Krohne 90.19**	**6**
**Luke Woodhouse 90.18**	**6**
Dragutin Horvat 77.72	0
**Niels Zonneveld 89.61**	**6**
Alt	Keane Barry 85.56	1
Ryan Joyce 81.17	3
**Alt**	**Lukas Wenig 80.33**	**6**
**Daryl Gurney 87.77**	**6**
Sebastian Białecki 84.94	4
**Richard Veenstra 89.05**	**6**
Florian Hempel 82.70	3

**Second round** (best of 11 legs); 14 March
Alt	Karel Sedláček 81.91	4
**Alt**	**Mensur Suljović 90.09**	**6**
16	Rob Cross 94.57	5
**Dirk van Duijvenbode 94.65**	**6**
**8**	**Danny Noppert 85.85**	**6**
Ricky Evans 83.92	1
**9**	**Gerwyn Price 106.70**	**6**
Joe Cullen 90.69	2
Alt	Cam Crabtree 84.55	4
**Kevin Doets 95.58**	**6**
**13**	**Damon Heta 101.42**	**6**
Darius Labanauskas 95.50	3
5	Stephen Bunting 95.94	5
**Niko Springer 96.84**	**6**
**12**	**Ross Smith 93.08**	**6**
Dave Chisnall 88.98	4
**2**	**Gian van Veen 94.18**	**6**
Krzysztof Ratajski 89.29	1
15	Mike De Decker 93.47	2
**Wessel Nijman 100.42**	**6**
**7**	**Josh Rock 90.78**	**6**
Paul Krohne 86.82	4
**10**	**Chris Dobey 98.35**	**6**
Luke Woodhouse 95.48	1
3	Michael van Gerwen 107.00	2
**Niels Zonneveld 104.46**	**6**
**14**	**Jermaine Wattimena 99.19**	**6**
Alt	Lukas Wenig 93.91	5
**6**	**Ryan Searle 99.47**	**6**
Daryl Gurney 94.09	3
11	Martin Schindler 92.19	4
**Richard Veenstra 97.11**	**6**

**Third round** (best of 11 legs); 15 March
Alt	Suljović 84.19	1
**van Duijvenbode 99.69**	**6**
8	Noppert 98.14	5
**9**	**Price 99.13**	**6**
Doets 95.24	3
**13**	**Heta 93.46**	**6**
**Springer 95.03**	**6**
12	Smith 97.42	5
2	van Veen 90.60	1
**Nijman 112.87**	**6**
**7**	**Rock 92.33**	**6**
10	Dobey 90.60	5
**Zonneveld 98.19**	**6**
14	Wattimena 98.64	4
6	Searle 85.74	3
**Veenstra 83.03**	**6**

**Quarter-finals** (best of 11 legs); 15 March
van Duijvenbode 98.54	3
**9**	**Price 98.61**	**6**
**13**	**Heta 100.66**	**6**
Springer 95.53	5
**Nijman 106.05**	**6**
7	Rock 95.19	2
**Zonneveld 98.20**	**6**
Veenstra 96.00	2

**Semi-finals** (best of 13 legs); 15 March
**9**	**Price 96.68**	**7**
13	Heta 97.51	5
**Nijman 110.41**	**7**
Zonneveld 96.85	1

**Final** (best of 15 legs); 15 March
9	Price 92.38	3
**Nijman 100.80**	**8**
