= Wessel Nijman =

Dutch darts player (born 2000)

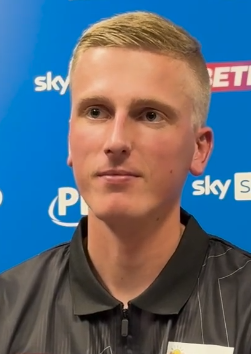
- Nijman at the 2025 World Matchplay

Personal information
- Born: 26 June 2000 (age 26) Uitgeest, Netherlands

Sport
- Sport: Darts
- Playing since: 2017
- Darts: 23g Mission Signature
- Laterality: Right-handed
- Walk-on music: "Summer of '69" by Bryan Adams

Organisation (see split in darts)
- PDC: 2016–2020; 2023–present (Tour Card: 2024–present)
- Current world ranking: (PDC) 10 ▲3 (22 November 2026)

WDF major events – best performances
- World Masters: Last 272: 2018

PDC premier events – best performances
- World Championship: Last 64: 2025, 2026
- World Matchplay: Last 16: 2025, 2026
- World Grand Prix: Last 16: 2026
- UK Open: Last 32: 2026
- Grand Slam: Last 16: 2025
- European Championship: Last 32: 2025, 2026
- PC Finals: Last 64: 2024, 2025
- World Series Finals: Last 16: 2024, 2026

Other tournament wins
- Years
- See Titles

Wessel Nijman (born 26 June 2000) is a Dutch professional darts player who competes in Professional Darts Corporation (PDC) events, where he is ranked world number ten, his peak ranking. He has won 11 PDC ranking titles, including two titles on the European Tour.

Following a match-fixing scandal in 2020 that saw him banned from the sport for two and a half years, Nijman returned to competitive darts in 2023. He finished third in the 2023 PDC Development Tour rankings, which led to him making his PDC World Championship debut at the 2024 edition, as well as earning a PDC Tour Card. Nijman found success in the PDC's youth system, winning twelve PDC Development Tours in total, topping the 2024 Development Tour rankings, and reaching the semi-finals at the 2023 PDC World Youth Championship.

Since gaining his Tour Card, Nijman has won nine Players Championships and two European Tour events, including six Players Championship titles during the 2026 season.

== Career ==
=== Early career ===
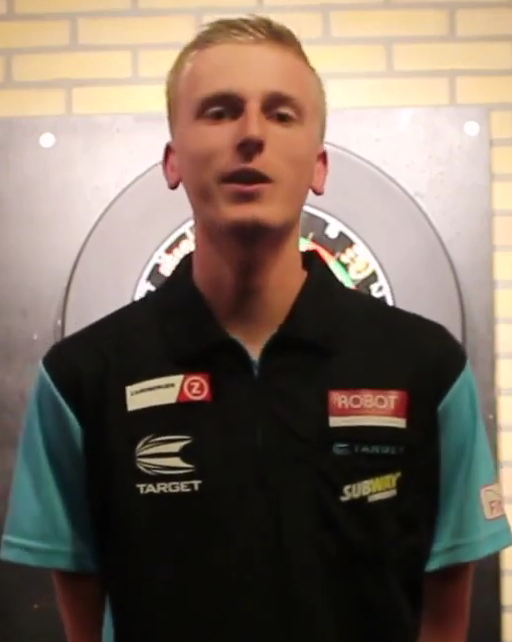
Nijman in 2019

Nijman reached the final of the 2017 WDF World Youth Cup's boys singles event, defeating Ireland's Keane Barry and Iran's Amirali-Mirzaei Goodarzi on his way. He lost 6–3 in legs to compatriot Justin van Tergouw in the final, who he partnered with to win the boys pairs event. In 2018, at the age of 17, he won his first PDC Development Tour title in the second event of the year by defeating Bradley Brooks 5–4 in the final.

Nijman was able to qualify for the 2019 Czech Darts Open in Prague as an Associate Member qualifier, but was beaten 6–0 by Corey Cadby in the first round. He also qualified for the 2019 Gibraltar Darts Trophy, where he won 6–5 against Darren Webster before losing to Mensur Suljović. Nijman also won the fourth Development Tour event in 2020.

=== Suspension ===
In 2020, the International Betting Integrity Association and the Darts Regulation Authority were alerted to suspicious betting patterns on matches in April and May during the Modus Live League, an online darts tournament series held amid the COVID-19 pandemic, in which Nijman was involved. He was suspended from attending or participating in events sanctioned by the Darts Regulation Authority in August 2020 after admitting to match fixing, which he called a "stupid mistake". A hearing by the Darts Regulation Authority's Disciplinary Committee took place in October, where Nijman's deliberate 4–0 loss to David Evans on 14 May resulted in him being banned from the sport for five years, with two and a half years of that ban being suspended after he took part in player education and anti-corruption measures. He was also ordered to pay £2,455.74. Nijman accepted the ruling, stating that although he was put under pressure by others to lose the match, he took full responsibility for his actions. His ban ended on 18 February 2023.

Nijman featured in an education film released by the Professional Players Federation and the Professional Darts Players Association in June 2022, where he gave his personal testimony and discussed the repercussions of partaking in match-fixing.

=== 2023 ===
Nijman returned to competitive darts in 2023. In March, he won a national title in the Netherlands at the Rivierenland Open in Wijchen. He competed in the 2023 PDC Development Tour series, winning three titles in events 6, 12 and 19. He qualified for the 2024 PDC World Darts Championship by placing third on the 2023 Development Tour Order of Merit. His ranking also secured him a two-year PDC Tour Card for the 2024 and 2025 seasons.

Nijman reached the semi-finals at the 2023 PDC World Youth Championship, defeating Nathan Rafferty and Owen Bates before losing 6–5 to Gian van Veen. On 19 December, Nijman made his World Championship debut, but he lost to Steve Beaton 3–1 in sets.

=== 2024 ===
In his full debut year on the PDC Pro Tour, Nijman qualified for four European Tours. At the sixth European Tour event of the year, the Baltic Sea Darts Open in May, he achieved a shock 6–3 victory over Luke Littler, before losing to Michael van Gerwen 6–2 in the second round.

Nijman topped the 2024 PDC Development Tour series Order of Merit, which qualified him for the 2024 Grand Slam of Darts. He won seven titles over the course of 24 events, including a pair of back-to-back titles: he won events 16 and 17 in July, followed by events 21 and 22 in October.

On 1 October, Nijman won his first senior PDC title at Players Championship 24, defeating Stephen Bunting 8–5 in the final. Later that month, he competed at the Grand Slam and despite good performances, he finished bottom of his group after losses to Bunting, Josh Rock and Gian van Veen.

=== 2025 ===
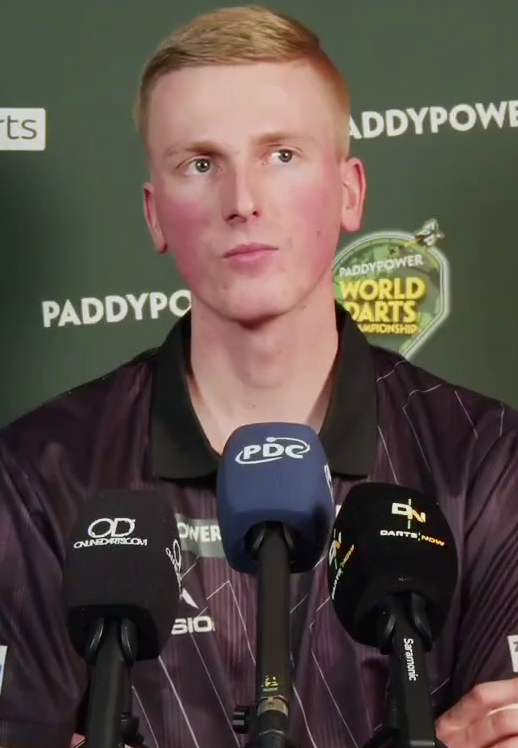
Nijman at the 2025 World Championship

Nijman entered the 2025 World Championship with high expectations, becoming as high as sixth favourite to win the tournament by bookmakers due to his good form in 2024. He narrowly defeated South African qualifier Cameron Carolissen 3–2 in the first round. He was eliminated in the second round following a 3–0 loss to Joe Cullen. Nijman qualified for the World Matchplay for the first time and defeated former champion Nathan Aspinall 10–6 in the first round. He lost 11–5 to James Wade in the second round. On the 2025 PDC Pro Tour, Nijman reached back-to-back European Tour semi-finals at the Dutch Darts Championship and the European Darts Open. He was a two-time winner in Players Championship events as he earned his second and third PDC ranking titles. He won Players Championship 30 by defeating Damon Heta 8–3 in the final, followed by an 8–5 victory over Luke Woodhouse in the final of Players Championship 34.

=== 2026 ===
At the 2026 World Championship, Nijman, the 31st seed, defeated Karel Sedláček 3–0 in the first round. He was eliminated from the tournament following a 3–0 loss to Gabriel Clemens in the second round. Nijman claimed his fourth PDC ranking title at Players Championship 2, defeating Gerwyn Price 8–7 in the final. At the European Darts Trophy, Nijman reached his first European Tour final following wins over Gian van Veen, Josh Rock and Niels Zonneveld. In a rematch against Price, he secured his first European Tour title by winning 8–3.

In late March, Nijman won Players Championship 8 with an 8–4 victory over Joe Cullen. He won a further two Players Championship titles at events 10 and 12 in April, defeating Scott Waites and Jermaine Wattimena in the respective finals. A run to the semi-finals of the European Darts Grand Prix saw Nijman enter the top 16 of the PDC World Rankings for the first time. He captured his fifth Players Championship title of the year with an 8–1 win against Max Hopp in the final of Players Championship 14. He defeated Ryan Searle 8–6 to win Players Championship 21 and become the first player to win six Players Championship titles in a calendar year since Michael van Gerwen in 2012. At the inaugural Slovak Darts Open, he won his second European Tour title by beating Rob Cross 8–3 in the final.

== Personal life ==
Nijman grew up on the same street as fellow darts player Niels Zonneveld in Uitgeest. He is a supporter of Dutch football club AZ Alkmaar.

== World Championship results ==
=== PDC World Championship ===
- 2024: First round (lost to Steve Beaton 1–3)
- 2025: Second round (lost to Joe Cullen 0–3)
- 2026: Second round (lost to Gabriel Clemens 0–3)

== Performance timeline ==
Wessel Nijman's performance timeline is as follows:

=== PDC ===
Tournament	2018	2019	2020	2021	2022	2023	2024	2025	2026
PDC Ranked televised events
World Championship	DNQ			Suspended			1R	2R	2R
World Masters (Note: A non-ranked event until 2025)	DNQ			Suspended			DNQ	Prel.	1R
UK Open	DNQ			Suspended		DNQ	3R	3R	5R
World Matchplay	DNQ			Suspended		DNQ		2R	2R
World Grand Prix	DNQ			Suspended		DNQ		1R	2R
European Championship	DNQ			Suspended		DNQ		1R	1R
Grand Slam	DNQ			Suspended		DNQ	RR	2R	RR
Players Championship Finals	DNQ			Suspended		DNQ	1R	1R	
PDC Non-ranked televised events
World Series Finals	DNP			Suspended			2R	1R	2R
World Youth Championship	RR	3R	Suspended			SF	QF	DNP	
Career statistics
Season-end ranking (PDC)	NR	157	Suspended			149	55	29	

==== European Tour ====
Season	1	2	3	4	5	6	7	8	9	10	11	12	13	14	15
2019	Did not participate/qualify								CDO; 1R	ADC; DNP	EDM; DNP	IDO; DNQ	GDT; 2R		
2024	Did not qualify				ADO; 2R	BSD; 2R	Did not qualify				HDT; QF	SDT; 3R	CDO; DNQ		
2025	BDO; 2R	EDT; 3R	IDO; QF	GDG; 1R	ADO; 3R	EDG; 2R	DDC; SF	EDO; SF	BSD; 3R	FDT; 1R	CDO; QF	HDT; 1R	SDT; 1R	GDC; 3R	
2026	PDO; QF	EDT; W	BDO; 1R	GDG; 1R	EDG; SF	ADO; 2R	IDO; 3R	BSD; QF	SDO; W	EDO; 3R	HDT; 2R	CDO; 3R	FDT; 3R	SDT; 2R	DDC; QF

==== Players Championships ====
Season	1	2	3	4	5	6	7	8	9	10	11	12	13	14	15	16	17	18	19	20	21	22	23	24	25	26	27	28	29	30	31	32	33	34
2019 (Note: Not a Tour card holder)	Did not participate																				HIL; 1R	HIL; 3R	Did not participate						BAR; 1R	BAR; 3R				
2024	WIG; 2R	WIG; 2R	LEI; 1R	LEI; 3R	HIL; 1R	HIL; 1R	LEI; 2R	LEI; 1R	HIL; 3R	HIL; 2R	HIL; 3R	HIL; 3R	MIL; 4R	MIL; 1R	MIL; F	MIL; 2R	MIL; 2R	MIL; 1R	MIL; 3R	WIG; 2R	WIG; 3R	MIL; 1R	MIL; 4R	WIG; W	WIG; 1R	WIG; 4R	WIG; SF	WIG; 4R	LEI; 2R	LEI; QF				
2025	WIG; 4R	WIG; 4R	ROS; 4R	ROS; 4R	LEI; 2R	LEI; 2R	HIL; 1R	HIL; 1R	LEI; 4R	LEI; 1R	LEI; 4R	LEI; 3R	ROS; QF	ROS; 3R	HIL; 1R	HIL; 1R	LEI; 4R	LEI; 1R	LEI; SF	LEI; 2R	LEI; 2R	HIL; 1R	HIL; SF	MIL; 2R	MIL; QF	HIL; QF	HIL; 4R	LEI; 4R	LEI; SF	LEI; W	WIG; QF	WIG; QF	WIG; SF	WIG; W
2026	HIL; QF	HIL; W	WIG; 3R	WIG; F	LEI; DNP		LEI; 3R	LEI; W	WIG; 2R	WIG; W	MIL; QF	MIL; W	HIL; 2R	HIL; W	LEI; 4R	LEI; 3R	LEI; QF	LEI; 1R	MIL; QF	MIL; 4R	WIG; W	WIG; 3R	LEI; 3R	LEI; 1R	HIL; 1R	HIL; 4R	LEI; SF	LEI; 3R	ROS; 4R	ROS; 2R	ROS; 2R	ROS; 4R	LEI; 4R	LEI; 4R

Performance Table Legend
W	Won the tournament	F	Finalist	SF	Semifinalist	QF	Quarterfinalist	#R; RR; Prel.	Lost in # round Round-robin; Preliminary round	DQ	Disqualified
DNQ	Did not qualify	DNP	Did not participate	WD	Withdrew	NH	Tournament not held	#R; RR; Prel.	Lost in # round Round-robin; Preliminary round	NYF	Not yet founded

== Titles ==
=== PDC titles ===
- PDC Pro Tour (11)
  - PDC European Tour (2)
    - 2026 (×2): European Trophy, Slovak Open
  - PDC Players Championships (9)
    - 2024 (×1): 24
    - 2025 (×2): 30, 34
    - 2026 (×6): 2, 8, 10, 12, 14, 21

==== Youth events ====
- PDC Development Tour (12)
  - 2018 (×1): 2
  - 2020 (×1): 4
  - 2023 (×3): 6, 12, 19
  - 2024 (×7): 8, 13, 16, 17, 19, 21, 22
