= 2026 World Grand Prix (darts) =

Darts tournament

2026 BOYLE Sports World Grand Prix

Tournament information
- Dates: 28 September–4 October 2026
- Venue: Mattioli Arena
- Location: Leicester, England
- Organisation(s): Professional Darts Corporation (PDC)
- Format: Sets "Double in, double out"
- Prize fund: £750,000
- Winner's share: £150,000
- High checkout: 167; Ryan Searle

Champion(s)
- Luke Humphries (ENG)

The 2026 World Grand Prix (known for sponsorship reasons as the 2026 BOYLE Sports World Grand Prix) was a professional darts tournament that took place at the Mattioli Arena in Leicester, England, from 28 September to 4 October 2026. It was the 29th staging of the World Grand Prix by the Professional Darts Corporation (PDC). The total prize fund was an increased total of £750,000, with the winner receiving £150,000.

Sponsored by BoyleSports, the tournament was played in the World Grand Prix's traditional "double in, double out" format. It featured 32 players, comprising the top 16 players in the PDC World Rankings and the top 16 players from the one-year PDC Pro Tour rankings who had not yet qualified. Luke Littler was the defending champion, having defeated Luke Humphries 6–1 in the 2025 final, but he lost 2–1 to Luke Woodhouse in the first round.

Humphries won the tournament for the second time in his fourth consecutive final, defeating Gerwyn Price 6–4 after going 0–3 down in sets. Price broke the record for the highest average in a World Grand Prix set, averaging 132.62 in the first set of the final.

== Overview ==
=== Background ===
The 2026 World Grand Prix was the 29th edition of the tournament to be staged by the Professional Darts Corporation (PDC) since the inaugural tournament in 1998. The tournament is unique as it is the only event in the PDC calendar that uses the "double in, double out" format, in which players must start on a double or the bullseye to start scoring and do the same to win a leg. The inaugural edition featured matches consisting of sets played to the best of three legs, with Phil Taylor winning the final 13–8 against Rod Harrington. Taylor is the most successful player in the tournament's history, winning 11 titles in total. In 2020, amidst the COVID-19 pandemic, the World Grand Prix was relocated to England due to the Citywest being used for health services, with the event being held in Leicester since 2021. Brendan Dolan, James Wade and Robert Thornton are the only players to hit a double-start nine-dart finish at the World Grand Prix.

The 2026 edition took place from 28 September to 4 October 2026 at the Mattioli Arena in Leicester. Irish gambling company BoyleSports continued its sponsorship of the event, having extended its partnership with the PDC until 2027. Luke Littler entered the tournament as defending champion after defeating Luke Humphries 6–1 in the 2025 final to win his first World Grand Prix title.

=== Format ===
The tournament featured 32 players; the top 16 players in the PDC World Rankings were seeded and were drawn against the 16 qualifiers from the PDC Pro Tour rankings in the first round. All matches were in set play format, with each set being played to the best of five legs (first to three). As per the "double in, double out" format, players had to begin a leg by hitting a double or the bullseye and do the same to win a leg. The amount of sets required to win a match increased as the tournament progressed:

Round	Best of (sets)	First to (sets)
First	3	2
Second	5	3
Quarter-finals	5	3
Semi-finals	9	5
Final	11	6

=== Prize money ===
The prize fund for the event increased to £750,000, up from the previous year's total of £600,000. The winner received £150,000. The prize money breakdown is shown below.

Position (num. of players)		Prize money (Total: £750,000)
Winner	(1)	£150,000
Runner-up	(1)	£80,000
Semi-finalists	(2)	£50,000
Quarter-finalists	(4)	£35,000
Second round	(8)	£20,000
First round	(16)	£7,500

== Qualification ==
The field of 32 players consisted of the top 16 players in the PDC World Rankings, who were seeded, and the top 16 non-qualified players from the PDC Pro Tour rankings as of 14 September.

=== PDC World Rankings ===
1. Luke Littler (ENG) (first round)
2. Luke Humphries (ENG) (champion)
3. Gian van Veen (NED) (quarter-finals)
4. Gerwyn Price (WAL) (runner-up)
5. Jonny Clayton (WAL) (quarter-finals)
6. James Wade (ENG) (semi-finals)
7. Josh Rock (NIR) (first round)
8. Danny Noppert (NED) (second round)
9. Michael van Gerwen (NED) (first round)
10. Gary Anderson (SCO) (second round)
11. Stephen Bunting (ENG) (second round)
12. Wessel Nijman (NED) (second round)
13. Ross Smith (ENG) (second round)
14. Ryan Searle (ENG) (second round)
15. Chris Dobey (ENG) (first round)
16. Nathan Aspinall (ENG) (semi-finals)

=== PDC Pro Tour Rankings ===
1. Luke Woodhouse (ENG) (second round)
2. Kevin Doets (NED) (first round)
3. Jermaine Wattimena (NED) (second round)
4. Krzysztof Ratajski (POL) (first round)
5. Andrew Gilding (ENG) (first round)
6. William O'Connor (IRL) (first round)
7. Damon Heta (AUS) (first round)
8. Rob Cross (ENG) (first round)
9. Ryan Joyce (ENG) (quarter-finals)
10. Dirk van Duijvenbode (NED) (first round)
11. Niels Zonneveld (NED) (quarter-finals)
12. Cameron Menzies (SCO) (first round)
13. Niko Springer (GER) (first round)
14. Dave Chisnall (ENG) (first round)
15. Sebastian Białecki (POL) (first round)
16. Joe Cullen (ENG) (first round)

== Draw ==
First round (best of 3 sets); 28–29 September
1	Luke Littler 82.41	1
Luke Woodhouse 82.51	2
16	Nathan Aspinall 89.20	2
Kevin Doets 92.27	1
8	Danny Noppert 88.42	2
Niko Springer 83.58	1
9	Michael van Gerwen 87.10	1
Ryan Joyce 85.21	2
4	Gerwyn Price 101.61	2
Sebastian Białecki 82.88	0
13	Ross Smith 99.54	2
Cameron Menzies 90.85	1
5	Jonny Clayton 85.52	2
Krzysztof Ratajski 80.85	1
12	Wessel Nijman 82.43	2
Rob Cross 81.02	0
2	Luke Humphries 80.41	2
Dave Chisnall 75.38	0
15	Chris Dobey 79.93	0
Jermaine Wattimena 86.55	2
7	Josh Rock 94.14	1
Niels Zonneveld 92.14	2
10	Gary Anderson 90.11	2
Damon Heta 86.39	1
3	Gian van Veen 85.79	2
Dirk van Duijvenbode 83.30	0
14	Ryan Searle 84.69	2
William O'Connor 91.03	1
6	James Wade 88.65	2
Joe Cullen 83.72	1
11	Stephen Bunting 86.26	2
Andrew Gilding 82.55	1

Second round (best of 5 sets); 30 September – 1 October
Luke Woodhouse 86.43	0
16	Nathan Aspinall 96.27	3
8	Danny Noppert 85.99	0
Ryan Joyce 86.04	3
4	Gerwyn Price 90.81	3
13	Ross Smith 91.11	0
5	Jonny Clayton 93.08	3
12	Wessel Nijman 88.31	1
2	Luke Humphries 94.11	3
Jermaine Wattimena 85.33	0
Niels Zonneveld 85.16	3
10	Gary Anderson 84.58	1
3	Gian van Veen 85.89	3
14	Ryan Searle 84.73	2
6	James Wade 93.20	3
11	Stephen Bunting 96.29	1

Quarter-finals (best of 5 sets); 2 October
16	Nathan Aspinall 105.15	3
Ryan Joyce 86.36	0
4	Gerwyn Price 91.93	3
5	Jonny Clayton 83.00	2
2	Luke Humphries 85.91	3
Niels Zonneveld 85.91	0
3	Gian van Veen 81.56	0
6	James Wade 96.71	3

Semi-finals (best of 9 sets); 3 October
16	Nathan Aspinall 84.63	2
4	Gerwyn Price 89.90	5
2	Luke Humphries 96.83	5
6	James Wade 91.72	3

Final (best of 11 sets); 4 October
4	Gerwyn Price 95.37	4
2	Luke Humphries 93.16	6
