= Kevin Doets =

Dutch darts player (born 1998)

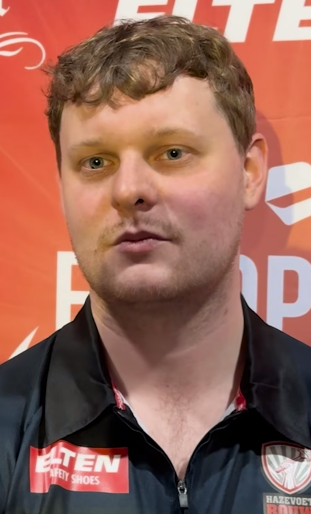
- Doets in 2026

Personal information
- Nickname: "Hawkeye"
- Born: 5 May 1998 (age 28) Almere, Netherlands

Sport
- Sport: Darts
- Playing since: 2011
- Darts: 21g Target Signature
- Laterality: Right-handed
- Walk-on music: "You Give Love a Bad Name" by Bon Jovi

Organisation (see split in darts)
- BDO: 2018–2019
- PDC: 2020–present (Tour Card: 2022–present)
- Current world ranking: (PDC) 23 (5 November 2026)

WDF major events – best performances
- Dutch Open: Quarter Final: 2019

PDC premier events – best performances
- World Championship: Last 16: 2025, 2026
- World Matchplay: Last 32: 2026
- World Grand Prix: Last 32: 2026
- UK Open: Last 32: 2023, 2024, 2026
- Grand Slam: Semi Final: 2026
- European Championship: Last 16: 2026
- PC Finals: Last 32: 2023
- Masters: Last 32: 2025
- World Series Finals: Last 16: 2024, 2025

Other tournament wins
- Years
Players Championship	2026
Catalonia Open	2019
PDC Challenge Tour	2020, 2021
PDC Development Tour	2020, 2021, 2022

Kevin Doets (Dutch pronunciation: [ˈkɛvɪn ˈduts]; born 5 May 1998) is a Dutch professional darts player who competes in Professional Darts Corporation (PDC) events. A PDC Tour Card holder since 2022, Doets won his first PDC ranking title at Players Championship 13 in 2026. He reached the last 16 of the PDC World Championship in both 2025 and 2026.

In his early career, Doets found success in the PDC secondary tours, winning two Challenge Tours and three Development Tours. He also won the 2019 Catalonia Open under the British Darts Organisation (BDO) system. He contested his first PDC ranking final at Players Championship 20 in 2023. He defeated Luke Woodhouse 8–5 to win his first PDC ranking title in May 2026, followed by his maiden European Tour final at the Austrian Darts Open six days later.

== Career ==
=== 2019–2021 ===
In 2019, Doets won the Catalonia Open, defeating Carlos Arola 6–3 in the final. He reached the quarter-finals at the 2019 Dutch Open.

Doets found much success on the PDC Challenge Tour and PDC Development Tour in 2020 and 2021. He won his first Development Tour title in Event Five of 2020 and followed that with his first Challenge Tour title two weeks later. He added additional Challenge Tour and Development Tour wins in 2021.

Doets made the semi-finals of the 2021 PDC World Youth Championship, beating reigning champion Bradley Brooks along the way before losing to eventual champion Ted Evetts.

Despite not having a PDC Tour Card, Doets qualified for the 2021 Players Championship Finals, where he lost in the first round to Michael van Gerwen.

=== 2022–2023 ===
At 2022 PDC Q-School, Doets won his Tour Card by finishing third on the European Q-School Order of Merit. He also played in the 2022 PDC Development Tour series, picking up another Development Tour title, beating Josh Rock 5–3 in the final of Event Four.

In 2023, Doets reached his first senior PDC final when he made it to the final of Players Championship 20, but lost 8–6 to Luke Humphries.

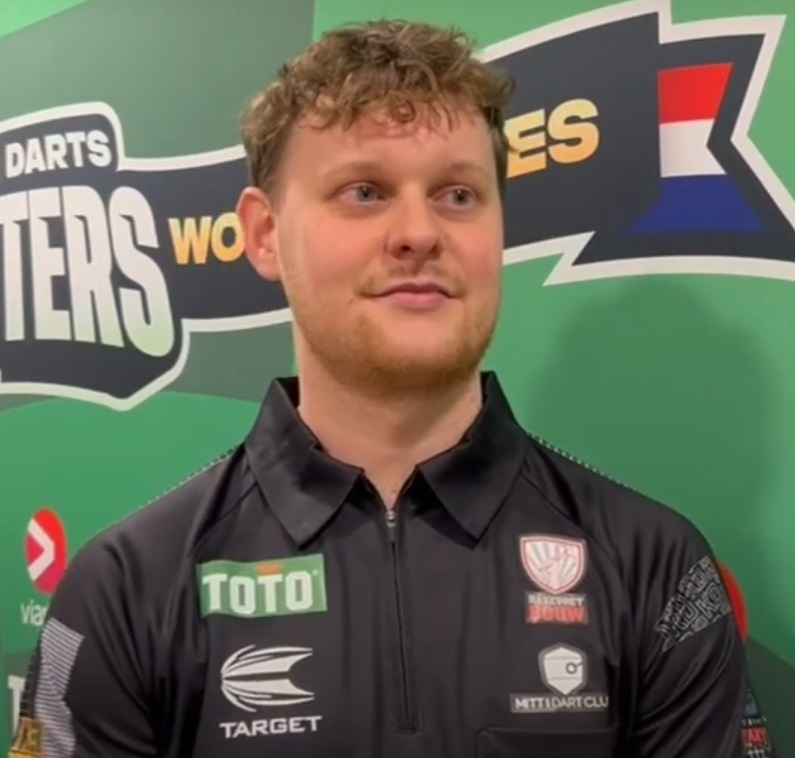
Doets at the 2024 Dutch Darts Masters

=== 2024 ===
Doets secured his PDC World Darts Championship debut by qualifying for the 2024 World Championship through the Pro Tour Order of Merit. In the first round, he whitewashed Stowe Buntz 3–0 in sets. The same night, he played defending champion Michael Smith in the second round. Doets went 2–1 ahead but was ultimately eliminated by Smith in a 3–2 defeat.

Doets was invited to play at the 2024 Dutch Darts Masters. He played two-time World Champion Peter Wright in the first round and won 6–1, before going out in the quarter-finals. As a result, he was invited to the 2024 World Series of Darts Finals in September. He whitewashed Keane Barry 6–0 in the opening round with an average of 109.98—the third highest average in the event's history. Doets lost 6–5 to Rob Cross in the next round.

=== 2025 ===
At the 2025 World Championship, Doets defeated Dutch compatriot Noa-Lynn van Leuven 3–1 in the first round. This win set up a second-round tie with Michael Smith, a rematch of their meeting the previous year. With the pair level at 2–2, Doets and Smith entered a deciding set tiebreaker where the match had to be won by two clear legs. Doets eventually won the final set 6–4 in legs in a major upset, eliminating the second seed and former World Champion. Doets won his third round match against Krzysztof Ratajski 4–3, surviving four match darts from Ratajski to progress to the last 16. He was eliminated after a 4–3 loss to Chris Dobey.

Doets qualified for the World Masters after wins over Andy Boulton, Radek Szagański and Dylan Slevin in the preliminary rounds. He was beaten in a deciding leg by Peter Wright in the first round.

=== 2026 ===
Doets opened the 2026 World Championship with wins over Matthew Dennant and David Munyua. In the third round, he won six consecutive legs to defeat Nathan Aspinall 4–3. Reaching the last 16 for the second straight year, he was eliminated in a 4–1 defeat to Luke Humphries.

At the European Darts Trophy in March, Doets achieved the highest three-dart average in the tournament's history, averaging 117.12 in a 6–0 win over Jonas Masalin. The next month, he reached his first European Tour semi-final at the German Darts Grand Prix, which he lost 7–2 to Nathan Aspinall. He then achieved his first PDC ranking title at Players Championship 13 in May, winning the final 8–5 against Luke Woodhouse. At the Austrian Darts Open six days later, he reached his maiden European Tour final, but lost 8–6 to Josh Rock. He made his World Matchplay debut in July, where he was beaten 10–6 by Ross Smith in the first round. Doets was a finalist at Players Championship 27, losing 8–6 to Jermaine Wattimena.

== Personal life ==
Doets is originally from Almere in the Netherlands. He lives in Sweden and has a son.

== World Championship results ==
=== PDC ===
- 2024: Second round (lost to Michael Smith 2–3)
- 2025: Fourth round (lost to Chris Dobey 3–4)
- 2026: Fourth round (lost to Luke Humphries 1–4)

== Performance timeline ==
Tournament	2020	2021	2022	2023	2024	2025	2026
PDC Ranked televised events
World Championship	Did not qualify				2R	4R	4R
World Masters	Did not qualify					1R	Prel.
UK Open	3R	3R	2R	5R	5R	4R	5R
World Matchplay	Did not qualify						1R
World Grand Prix	Did not qualify						1R
European Championship	Did not qualify						2R
Grand Slam	Did not qualify						SF
Players Championship Finals	DNQ	1R	1R	2R	1R	1R	
PDC Non-ranked televised events
World Series Finals	Did not qualify				2R	2R	1R
World Youth Championship	RR	SF	2R	Did not participate			
Career statistics
Season-end ranking (PDC)	164	106	95	62	41	38	

=== PDC European Tour ===
Season	1	2	3	4	5	6	7	8	9	10	11	12	13	14	15
2022	Did not qualify				EDO; 1R	Did not qualify						BDO; 1R	GDT; DNQ		
2023	Did not qualify										GDO; 2R	DNQ			
2024	BDO; DNQ	GDG; 1R	Did not qualify				DDC; 2R	EDO; 3R	GDC; DNQ	FDT; 2R	DNQ		CDO; 1R		
2025	BDO; DNQ	EDT; 1R	IDO; DNQ	GDG; 1R	ADO; 3R	Did not qualify					CDO; 2R	Did not qualify			
2026	PDO; DNQ	EDT; 3R	BDO; DNQ	GDG; SF	EDG; 2R	ADO; F	IDO; 3R	BSD; QF	SDO; 3R	EDO; 3R	HDT; 1R	CDO; 2R	FDT; 3R	SDT; 2R	DDC; DNP

=== PDC Players Championships ===
Season	1	2	3	4	5	6	7	8	9	10	11	12	13	14	15	16	17	18	19	20	21	22	23	24	25	26	27	28	29	30	31	32	33	34
2020 (Note: Not a Tour card holder)	Did not participate																		COV; 2R	COV; 2R	COV; 1R	COV; 1R	COV; 1R											
2021	Did not participate								NIE; 2R	NIE; 2R	NIE; 2R	NIE; 2R	MIL; 2R	MIL; 1R	MIL; 3R	MIL; 2R	COV; 1R	COV; 2R	COV; 4R	COV; 2R	BAR; 2R	BAR; 2R	BAR; 2R	BAR; 2R	BAR; 2R	BAR; 3R	BAR; 2R	BAR; 4R	BAR; 1R	BAR; 2R				
2022	BAR; 3R	BAR; 3R	WIG; 3R	WIG; 3R	BAR; 1R	BAR; 1R	NIE; SF	NIE; 1R	BAR; 2R	BAR; 3R	BAR; 1R	BAR; 1R	BAR; 2R	WIG; 2R	WIG; 1R	NIE; 1R	NIE; 2R	BAR; 1R	BAR; 1R	BAR; 4R	BAR; 2R	BAR; 1R	BAR; 2R	BAR; 1R	BAR; 1R	BAR; 4R	BAR; 1R	BAR; 1R	BAR; 1R	BAR; 3R				
2023	BAR; 1R	BAR; 2R	BAR; 3R	BAR; 1R	BAR; 4R	BAR; 1R	HIL; 2R	HIL; DNP	WIG; 1R	WIG; 1R	LEI; 4R	LEI; 2R	HIL; 2R	HIL; 1R	LEI; 4R	LEI; 4R	HIL; 3R	HIL; 1R	BAR; 4R	BAR; F	BAR; 1R	BAR; QF	BAR; 1R	BAR; 2R	BAR; 1R	BAR; 3R	BAR; 1R	BAR; 2R	BAR; 1R	BAR; 2R				
2024	WIG; 2R	WIG; 3R	LEI; 3R	LEI; 3R	HIL; 2R	HIL; 2R	LEI; 3R	LEI; QF	HIL; 4R	HIL; 3R	HIL; QF	HIL; 1R	MIL; 3R	MIL; 1R	MIL; 2R	MIL; 3R	MIL; 1R	MIL; 2R	MIL; 1R	WIG; 4R	WIG; 1R	MIL; 2R	MIL; 2R	WIG; 2R	WIG; 1R	WIG; 2R	WIG; 1R	WIG; 1R	LEI; 2R	LEI; 3R				
2025	WIG; 3R	WIG; 1R	ROS; 1R	ROS; 3R	LEI; QF	LEI; QF	HIL; QF	HIL; QF	LEI; 1R	LEI; 4R	LEI; 1R	LEI; 2R	ROS; 3R	ROS; 3R	HIL; 2R	HIL; QF	LEI; 3R	LEI; 2R	LEI; 4R	LEI; 2R	LEI; QF	HIL; 3R	HIL; 3R	MIL; 1R	MIL; 1R	HIL; 2R	HIL; 1R	LEI; SF	LEI; 1R	LEI; 1R	WIG; 1R	WIG; 2R	WIG; 2R	WIG; QF
2026	HIL; 1R	HIL; 4R	WIG; QF	WIG; 2R	LEI; 3R	LEI; QF	LEI; 2R	LEI; SF	WIG; 4R	WIG; QF	MIL; SF	MIL; SF	HIL; W	HIL; 1R	LEI; 2R	LEI; 4R	LEI; SF	LEI; QF	MIL; 1R	MIL; 1R	WIG; QF	WIG; 2R	LEI; 2R	LEI; 3R	HIL; QF	HIL; 2R	LEI; F	LEI; 2R	ROS; SF	ROS; 4R	ROS; QF	ROS; 4R	LEI; 1R	LEI; 1R

Performance Table Legend
W	Won the tournament	F	Finalist	SF	Semifinalist	QF	Quarterfinalist	#R; RR; Prel.	Lost in # round Round-robin; Preliminary round	DQ	Disqualified
DNQ	Did not qualify	DNP	Did not participate	WD	Withdrew	NH	Tournament not held	#R; RR; Prel.	Lost in # round Round-robin; Preliminary round	NYF	Not yet founded
