= Niels Zonneveld =

Dutch darts player (born 1998)

- Zonneveld at the 2026 Grand Slam of Darts

Personal information
- Nickname: "Triple Z"
- Born: 22 July 1998 (age 28) Uitgeest, Netherlands

Sport
- Sport: Darts
- Playing since: 2014
- Darts: 23g Shot Signature
- Laterality: Left-handed
- Walk-on music: "The Nights" by Avicii

Organisation (see split in darts)
- PDC: 2019–present (Tour Card: 2019–present)
- Current world ranking: (PDC) 28 (5 November 2026)

PDC premier events – best performances
- World Championship: Last 32: 2026
- World Matchplay: Last 32: 2026
- World Grand Prix: Quarter-final: 2026
- UK Open: Last 32: 2022
- Grand Slam: Group Stage: 2026
- European Championship: Last 32: 2026
- PC Finals: Last 16: 2023, 2024
- Masters: Last 32: 2026
- World Series Finals: Quarter-final: 2021

Other tournament wins
- Years
PDC European Tour (×1): 2026 Dutch Darts Championship
PDC Development Tour (×2): 2018 (×1); 2020 (×1)

Niels Zonneveld (born 22 July 1998) is a Dutch professional darts player who competes in Professional Darts Corporation (PDC) events. Nicknamed "Triple Z", he won his first PDC ranking title at the 2026 Dutch Darts Championship. He contested the final at 2025 Players Championship 22 and was a quarter-finalist at the 2021 World Series Finals and the 2026 World Grand Prix.

In youth darts, Zonneveld two PDC Development Tours and reached the semi-finals of the 2020 PDC World Youth Championship.

== Career ==
=== 2018–2021 ===
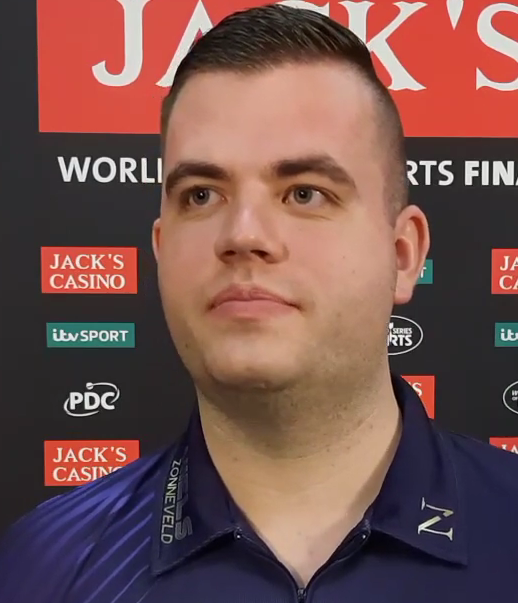
Zonneveld in 2021

Zonneveld started playing on the PDC Development Tour in 2018, picking up his first title on the tour in only his fourth event where he defeated Joe Davis 5–2 in the final. At the end of the 2018 Development Tour season, he finished 9th on the Order of Merit ranking. Zonneveld attended European Q-School in 2019, where he won his PDC Tour Card on Day 1, beating Christian Gödl 5–1 in the final. He made it to the semi finals of the 2020 PDC World Youth Championship but lost to the eventual champion Bradley Brooks 6–1.

Zonneveld qualified for the 2021 PDC World Darts Championship through the PDPA Rest of the World Qualifier. This was his debut at the competition. He went out in the first round, being whitewashed by William O'Connor 3–0 in sets. After the World Championship, he regained his Tour Card at 2021 Q-School. Zonneveld qualified for the 2021 World Series of Darts Finals as one of the four Tour Card holder qualifiers, where he had his deepest run at a PDC major event. He reached the quarter finals, including a 6–4 victory over Gary Anderson in the second round. His run was ended by Krzysztof Ratajski.

=== 2022–2025 ===
Zonneveld reached the fifth round of the 2022 UK Open, losing 10–9 to Keane Barry. At the 2022 Belgian Darts Open, he earned an upset win over reigning world champion Peter Wright in the second round, beating him 6–5. The game became known for Wright's refusal to fist bump Zonneveld before the deciding leg, a gesture common amongst darts players. Zonneveld reflected on the incident on the Double Top podcast in 2024, stating that the close win over Wright was "kind of the ultimate revenge", but explained that Wright apologised afterwards. He lost 6–3 to Andrew Gilding in the third round.

After a 3–0 loss to Lewy Williams in the first round of the 2023 World Championship, Zonneveld regained his PDC Tour Card at 2023 Q-School. He earned his first win at the PDC World Championship when he defeated Darren Webster 3–1 in the first round of the 2024 event. He reached his first European Tour semi-final when he defeated Jonny Clayton to progress to the semi-finals of the 2024 Czech Darts Open. He lost 7–6 to Kim Huybrechts, missing a match dart to make the final and ending his chances of qualifying for the 2024 European Championship. Zonneveld reached his first PDC ranking final at Players Championship 22 on the 2025 PDC Pro Tour. He lost 8–6 to Sebastian Białecki.

=== 2026 ===
Following a 3–0 win over Haupai Puha, Zonneveld defeated Michael Smith 3–1 in the second round of the 2026 World Championship, advancing to the third round of the tournament for the first time. He was eliminated by fifth seed Jonny Clayton, who triumphed 4–3 in a deciding set. In March 2026, he reached successive European Tour semi-finals at the European Darts Trophy and the Belgian Darts Open, achieving a 6–5 victory over reigning world champion Luke Littler in the latter. He made his World Matchplay debut in July, losing a sudden-death leg to Stephen Bunting in the first round. Zonneveld earned his first PDC ranking tour at the Dutch Darts Championship, defeating Danny Noppert 8–5 in the final.

== Personal life ==
Zonneveld did not have a darting nickname until 2021, when he chose the name "Triple Z". In an interview with Sportsnieuws.nl, Zonneveld confirmed it was a shortening of "Zig Zag Zonneveld", which some commentators had called him due to his tendency to move his elbows when throwing.

Zonneveld grew up on the same street as fellow darts player Wessel Nijman in Uitgeest. Outside of darts, he previously worked as an accountant; he quit his job in 2023 after retaining his PDC Tour Card at Q-School. He has also worked as a darts analyst for Viaplay.

== World Championship results ==
=== PDC ===
- 2021: First round (lost to William O'Connor 0–3)
- 2023: First round (lost to Lewy Williams 0–3)
- 2024: Second round (lost to Ross Smith 1–3)
- 2025: First round (lost to Robert Owen 1–3)
- 2026: Third round (lost to Jonny Clayton 3–4)

== Performance timeline ==
Tournament	2018	2019	2020	2021	2022	2023	2024	2025	2026
PDC Ranked televised events
World Championship	Did not qualify			1R	DNQ	1R	2R	1R	3R
World Masters	Did not qualify							Prel.	1R
UK Open	DNP	1R	3R	2R	5R	3R	2R	3R	4R
World Matchplay	Did not qualify								1R
World Grand Prix	Did not qualify								QF
European Championship	Did not qualify								1R
Grand Slam	Did not qualify								RR
Players Championship Finals	DNQ		2R	DNQ	1R	3R	3R	1R	
PDC Non-ranked televised events
World Series Finals	Did not qualify			QF	Did not qualify				
World Youth Championship	RR	3R	SF	2R	2R	Did not play			
Career statistics
Season-end ranking	NR	146	79	113	69	73	48	42	

=== PDC European Tour ===
Season	1	2	3	4	5	6	7	8	9	10	11	12	13	14	15
2019	Did not qualify					EDG; 2R	Did not qualify								
2022	Did not qualify						EDG; 1R	DDC; 1R	EDM; 1R	DNQ		BDO; 3R	GDT; DNQ		
2023	BSD; 1R	Did not qualify													
2024	BDO; DNQ	GDG; 1R	IDO; DNQ	EDG; 1R	ADO; DNQ	BSD; 1R	DDC; 2R	Did not qualify			HDT; 2R	SDT; DNQ	CDO; SF		
2025	Did not qualify			GDG; 3R	ADO; DNQ	EDG; 3R	DDC; 1R	EDO; 1R	Did not qualify				SDT; 2R	GDC; 2R	
2026	PDO; 2R	EDT; SF	BDO; SF	GDG; QF	EDG; 1R	ADO; 2R	IDO; 2R	BSD; 2R	SDO; 2R	EDO; 2R	HDT; 1R	CDO; 1R	FDT; 2R	SDT; 1R	DDC; W

=== PDC Players Championships ===
Season	1	2	3	4	5	6	7	8	9	10	11	12	13	14	15	16	17	18	19	20	21	22	23	24	25	26	27	28	29	30	31	32	33	34
2019	WIG; DNP		WIG; 1R	WIG; 2R	BAR; 1R	BAR; 1R	WIG; 1R	WIG; 1R	BAR; 3R	BAR; 1R	BAR; 1R	BAR; 2R	BAR; 1R	BAR; 2R	BAR; 1R	BAR; 1R	WIG; 2R	WIG; 1R	BAR; 2R	BAR; 1R	HIL; 2R	HIL; 1R	BAR; 1R	BAR; 1R	BAR; 2R	BAR; 1R	DUB; 1R	DUB; 1R	BAR; 1R	BAR; 2R				
2020	BAR; 1R	BAR; 3R	WIG; 1R	WIG; 2R	WIG; 3R	WIG; 2R	BAR; 2R	BAR; 2R	MIL; 2R	MIL; 4R	MIL; 1R	MIL; 2R	MIL; 1R	NIE; 1R	NIE; 1R	NIE; 2R	NIE; 1R	NIE; 2R	COV; 2R	COV; 1R	COV; 2R	COV; 1R	COV; 3R											
2021	BOL; 1R	BOL; 1R	BOL; 1R	BOL; 1R	MIL; 1R	MIL; QF	MIL; 1R	MIL; 2R	NIE; 2R	NIE; 1R	NIE; 1R	NIE; 1R	MIL; 2R	MIL; 2R	MIL; 4R	MIL; 1R	COV; 2R	COV; 1R	COV; 3R	COV; 3R	BAR; 2R	BAR; 1R	BAR; 2R	BAR; 2R	BAR; 1R	BAR; 2R	BAR; 1R	BAR; 1R	BAR; 2R	BAR; DNP				
2022	BAR; 2R	BAR; QF	WIG; 4R	WIG; 3R	BAR; 1R	BAR; 1R	NIE; 1R	NIE; 2R	BAR; 1R	BAR; 3R	BAR; 1R	BAR; 2R	BAR; 1R	WIG; 1R	WIG; 2R	NIE; 2R	NIE; 1R	BAR; 1R	BAR; QF	BAR; 1R	BAR; 4R	BAR; 1R	BAR; 4R	BAR; 2R	BAR; 1R	BAR; 1R	BAR; 1R	BAR; 3R	BAR; 1R	BAR; 1R				
2023	BAR; 2R	BAR; 2R	BAR; 4R	BAR; 2R	BAR; 1R	BAR; 1R	HIL; 2R	HIL; 2R	WIG; 1R	WIG; 2R	LEI; SF	LEI; 1R	HIL; 4R	HIL; 4R	LEI; 1R	LEI; 2R	HIL; 2R	HIL; 1R	BAR; 1R	BAR; 1R	BAR; 4R	BAR; 1R	BAR; 1R	BAR; 1R	BAR; 2R	BAR; 1R	BAR; QF	BAR; 4R	BAR; 1R	BAR; 1R				
2024	WIG; 2R	WIG; QF	LEI; 3R	LEI; 4R	HIL; 2R	HIL; 2R	LEI; 1R	LEI; 1R	HIL; 2R	HIL; 3R	HIL; QF	HIL; 1R	MIL; QF	MIL; 2R	MIL; 1R	MIL; 2R	MIL; 4R	MIL; 3R	MIL; 1R	WIG; 1R	WIG; 1R	MIL; 2R	MIL; 3R	WIG; 3R	WIG; 1R	WIG; 1R	WIG; 1R	WIG; 2R	LEI; 3R	LEI; 3R				
2025	WIG; 3R	WIG; 3R	ROS; 2R	ROS; 2R	LEI; 3R	LEI; 1R	HIL; 1R	HIL; QF	LEI; QF	LEI; 2R	LEI; SF	LEI; 1R	ROS; 3R	ROS; 1R	HIL; 4R	HIL; 2R	LEI; 1R	LEI; SF	LEI; 3R	LEI; 1R	LEI; 2R	HIL; F	HIL; 1R	MIL; 1R	MIL; 1R	HIL; 2R	HIL; 3R	LEI; 2R	LEI; 4R	LEI; 4R	WIG; SF	WIG; 2R	WIG; 3R	WIG; 3R
2026	HIL; 1R	HIL; 1R	WIG; 3R	WIG; QF	LEI; QF	LEI; 1R	LEI; 1R	LEI; 2R	WIG; 2R	WIG; 4R	MIL; 2R	MIL; 1R	HIL; 2R	HIL; 1R	LEI; 1R	LEI; 1R	LEI; 1R	LEI; 3R	MIL; DNP		WIG; 4R	WIG; 1R	LEI; 1R	LEI; 3R	HIL; 2R	HIL; 4R	LEI; 3R	LEI; 2R	ROS; 2R	ROS; SF	ROS; 3R	ROS; 4R	LEI; F	LEI; 1R

Performance Table Legend
W	Won the tournament	F	Finalist	SF	Semifinalist	QF	Quarterfinalist	#R; RR; Prel.	Lost in # round Round-robin; Preliminary round	DQ	Disqualified
DNQ	Did not qualify	DNP	Did not participate	WD	Withdrew	NH	Tournament not held	#R; RR; Prel.	Lost in # round Round-robin; Preliminary round	NYF	Not yet founded
