= 2025 German Darts Grand Prix =

2025 Elten Safety Shoes German Darts Grand Prix

Tournament information
- Dates: 19–21 April 2025
- Venue: Kulturhalle Zenith
- Location: Munich, Germany
- Organisation(s): Professional Darts Corporation (PDC)
- Format: Legs; Final – first to 8 legs
- Prize fund: £175,000
- Winner's share: £30,000
- Nine-dart finish: Michael van Gerwen
- High checkout: 170 Luke Littler

Champion(s)
- Michael van Gerwen

The 2025 German Darts Grand Prix (known for sponsorship reasons as the 2025 Elten Safety Shoes German Darts Grand Prix) was a professional darts tournament that took place at the Kulturhalle Zenith in Munich, Germany from 19 to 21 April 2025. It was the fourth of fourteen PDC European Tour events on the 2025 PDC Pro Tour. It featured a field of 48 players and £175,000 in prize money, with £30,000 going to the winner.

Luke Humphries was the defending champion after defeating Michael van Gerwen 8–1 in the 2024 final. Humphries decided not to participate in the tournament, thus did not defend his title.

Van Gerwen beat Gian van Veen 8–5 in the final to win the tournament for the fourth time, his 38th European Tour title in all.

In the fifth leg of his third-round match against Ryan Searle, Van Gerwen hit his fourth nine-darter on the European Tour.

== Prize money ==
The prize fund remained at £175,000, with £30,000 to the winner:

Stage (num. of players)		Prize money
Winner	(1)	£30,000
Runner-up	(1)	£12,000
Semi-finalists	(2)	£8,500
Quarter-finalists	(4)	£6,000
Third round losers	(8)	£4,000
Second round losers	(16)	£2,500*
First round losers	(16)	£1,250*
Total	£175,000	

- Pre-qualified players from the Orders of Merit who lose in their first match of the event shall not be credited with prize money on any Order of Merit. A player who qualifies as a qualifier, but later becomes a seed due to the withdrawal of one or more other players shall be credited with their prize money on all Orders of Merit regardless of how far they progress in the event.

== Qualification and format ==
In a change from the previous year, the top 16 on the two-year main PDC Order of Merit ranking will now be seeded and enter the tournament in the second round, while the 16 qualifiers from the one-year PDC Pro Tour Order of Merit ranking will enter in the first round. The seedings were confirmed on 12 February.

The remaining 16 places will go to players from four qualifying events – 10 from the Tour Card Holder Qualifier (held on 19 February), four from the Host Nation Qualifier (held on 9 February), one from the Nordic & Baltic Associate Member Qualifier (held on 28 March) and one from the East European Associate Member Qualifier (held on 2 February).

Luke Humphries, Nathan Aspinall and Dimitri Van den Bergh withdrew and were replaced by Madars Razma, Kim Huybrechts and Mensur Suljović. Michael Smith, Ryan Searle and Joe Cullen moved up to become the 14th, 15th and 16th seeds respectively.

The following players took part in the tournament:

Seeded Players

1. Luke Littler (semi-finals)
2. Michael van Gerwen (champion)
3. Rob Cross (third round)
4. Jonny Clayton (second round)
5. Dave Chisnall (third round)
6. Gerwyn Price (third round)
7. Damon Heta (second round)
8. Peter Wright (quarter-finals)
9. Danny Noppert (second round)
10. James Wade (second round)
11. Josh Rock (semi-finals)
12. Ross Smith (quarter-finals)
13. Andrew Gilding (second round)
14. Michael Smith (second round)
15. Ryan Searle (third round)
16. Joe Cullen (third round)

Pro Tour Order of Merit Qualifiers
- Martin Schindler (third round)
- Daryl Gurney (first round)
- Gian van Veen (runner-up)
- Raymond van Barneveld (second round)
- Mike De Decker (second round)
- Wessel Nijman (first round)
- Ritchie Edhouse (first round)
- Cameron Menzies (second round)
- Jermaine Wattimena (second round)
- Dirk van Duijvenbode (second round)
- Luke Woodhouse (first round)
- Ricardo Pietreczko (second round)
- Ryan Joyce (quarter-finals)

Tour Card Qualifier
- Krzysztof Ratajski (quarter-finals)
- Robert Grundy (first round)
- Scott Williams (second round)
- Cam Crabtree (second round)
- Mario Vandenbogaerde (first round)
- Andy Boulton (first round)
- Kevin Doets (first round)
- Mickey Mansell (second round)
- Adam Paxton (first round)
- Niels Zonneveld (third round)
Host Nation Qualifier
- Michael Rosenauer (first round)
- Finn Behrens (first round)
- Michael Unterbuchner (first round)
- René Eidams (first round)
Nordic & Baltic Qualifier
- Johan Engström (first round)
East European Qualifier
- András Borbély (first round)
Reserve List
- Madars Razma (third round)
- Kim Huybrechts (second round)
- Mensur Suljović (first round)

== Draw ==
Numbers to the left of players' names show the seedings for the top 16 in the tournament. The figures to the right of a player's name state their three-dart average in a match. Players in bold denote match winners.

**First round** (best of 11 legs); 19 April
Luke Woodhouse 87.05	5
**Cam Crabtree 89.66**	**6**
Ritchie Edhouse 84.82	4
**Mickey Mansell 87.98**	**6**
**Mike De Decker 91.25**	**6**
Johan Engström 88.27	3
**Madars Razma 87.86**	**6**
Robert Grundy 85.42	3
**Martin Schindler 102.83**	**6**
Mario Vandenbogaerde 96.89	3
**Gian van Veen 102.47**	**6**
René Eidams 92.05	2
**Dirk van Duijvenbode 97.77**	**6**
Andy Boulton 79.47	1
**Jermaine Wattimena 88.54**	**6**
Michael Unterbuchner 81.14	3
**Kim Huybrechts 104.86**	**6**
Finn Behrens 76.59	0
**Cameron Menzies 92.23**	**6**
Kevin Doets 91.55	4
**Ryan Joyce 87.61**	**6**
András Borbély 78.48	1
Daryl Gurney 100.12	3
**Niels Zonneveld 95.61**	**6**
**Ricardo Pietreczko 106.00**	**6**
Adam Paxton 89.29	1
Mensur Suljović 89.09	5
**Krzysztof Ratajski 96.70**	**6**
**Raymond van Barneveld 97.61**	**6**
Michael Rosenauer 88.27	3
Wessel Nijman 92.01	4
**Scott Williams 94.84**	**6**

**Second round** (best of 11 legs); 20 April
**1**	**Luke Littler 107.10**	**6**
Cam Crabtree 96.24	1
**16**	**Joe Cullen 92.56**	**6**
Mickey Mansell 92.31	2
**8**	**Peter Wright 98.84**	**6**
Mike De Decker 97.05	3
9	Danny Noppert 90.97	2
**Madars Razma 96.02**	**6**
4	Jonny Clayton 85.30	1
**Martin Schindler 87.40**	**6**
13	Andrew Gilding 94.69	4
**Gian van Veen 99.24**	**6**
**5**	**Dave Chisnall 97.11**	**6**
Dirk van Duijvenbode 93.93	3
**12**	**Ross Smith 98.57**	**6**
Jermaine Wattimena 100.20	4
**2**	**Michael van Gerwen 102.49**	**6**
Kim Huybrechts 92.92	5
**15**	**Ryan Searle 90.07**	**6**
Cameron Menzies 83.98	2
7	Damon Heta 84.64	0
**Ryan Joyce 101.33**	**6**
10	James Wade 89.95	2
**Niels Zonneveld 100.38**	**6**
**3**	**Rob Cross 97.85**	**6**
Ricardo Pietreczko 94.20	4
14	Michael Smith 85.81	4
**Krzysztof Ratajski 88.57**	**6**
**6**	**Gerwyn Price 98.74**	**6**
Raymond van Barneveld 93.56	3
**11**	**Josh Rock 100.73**	**6**
Scott Williams 94.82	2

**Third round** (best of 11 legs); 21 April
**1**	**Littler 99.67**	**6**
16	Cullen 95.90	3
**8**	**Wright 91.42**	**6**
Razma 89.84	4
Schindler 99.89	4
**van Veen 99.17**	**6**
5	Chisnall 92.84	2
**12**	**R Smith 102.72**	**6**
**2**	**van Gerwen 104.82**	**6**
15	Searle 90.13	1
**Joyce 99.96**	**6**
Zonneveld 94.90	4
3	Cross 98.37	4
**Ratajski 94.66**	**6**
6	Price 99.72	4
**11**	**Rock 111.42**	**6**

**Quarter-finals** (best of 11 legs); 21 April
**1**	**Littler 95.79**	**6**
8	Wright 94.62	5
**van Veen 97.50**	**6**
12	R Smith 89.93	3
**2**	**van Gerwen 105.20**	**6**
Joyce 90.33	4
Ratajski 96.69	5
**11**	**Rock 96.56**	**6**

**Semi-finals** (best of 13 legs); 21 April
1	Littler 95.78	4
**van Veen 110.81**	**7**
**2**	**van Gerwen 104.37**	**7**
11	Rock 95.28	2

**Final** (best of 15 legs); 21 April
van Veen 96.53	5
**2**	**van Gerwen 95.98**	**8**

== Top averages ==
The table lists all players who achieved an average of at least 100 in a match. In the case one player has multiple records, this is indicated by the number in brackets.

#	Player	Round	Average	Result
1	Josh Rock	3	111.42	Won
2	Gian van Veen	SF	110.81	Won
3	Luke Littler	2	107.10	Won
4	Ricardo Pietreczko	1	106.00	Won
5	Michael van Gerwen	QF	105.20	Won
6	Kim Huybrechts	1	104.86	Won
7	Michael van Gerwen (2)	3	104.82	Won
8	Michael van Gerwen (3)	SF	104.37	Won
9	Martin Schindler	1	102.83	Won
10	Ross Smith	3	102.72	Won
11	Michael van Gerwen (4)	2	102.49	Won
12	Gian van Veen (2)	1	102.47	Won
13	Ryan Joyce	2	101.33	Won
14	Josh Rock (2)	2	100.73	Won
15	Niels Zonneveld	2	100.38	Won
16	Jermaine Wattimena	2	100.20	Lost
17	Daryl Gurney	1	100.12	Lost
