= Glossary of darts =

This is a glossary of terminology used in the game of darts. Where words in a sentence are also defined elsewhere in this article, they appear in italics.

== A ==
Alan Evans shot
Hitting three double-bulls in one turn.

Annie's Attic
Double 1.

Annie's room (or Annie's house)
The number 1.

Arraz/arrows
Another term for darts.

Archer
Refers to a player who throws very quick smooth darts, like an archer's arrow (also known as a 'Derek'). Contrast "Floater".

Audio Darts
Darts played with a talking electronic board, popular with visually impaired players. May also be played by blindfolded sighted players.

Average
Average score achieved every three darts thrown. See also PPD.

== B ==
Baby ton
A score of 95, usually by scoring five 19s.

Baby fish
A 130 checkout: T20, 20 (or 20, T20), Bull. First mentioned by Wayne Mardle commentating the 2019/20 WC.

Bag of nuts
A score of 45, named after the prize offered at a fairground.

Bagadix
A dart term used when a player scores 26 points by hitting a 20, a 5 and a 1. Over the years the term has been used more liberally to describe any combination of darts totalling a score of 26. Commonly coined, "Bag" for short.

Barrel
The part of a dart that a thrower grips, right behind the point.

Basement
The double-3.

Basil Brush
When someone loses without scoring a point, they are said to have been "brushed" or given the basil brush.

Baskin-Robbins
A throw with a total score of 31.

Baz
A darter with random and sporadic throwing ability.

Bed
A section of a number, usually referring to a double or triple.

Beehives
Cockney rhyming slang for "two fives".

Big Fish
A score of 170 to end a leg (triple-20, triple-20, inner bull) (See also: Maximum check-out)

Bounce out
When a dart bounces back off the board, usually after hitting a wire.

Break
Winning a leg as the player to go second at the start of that leg. Analogous to the usage of the term in tennis.

Breakfast (or bed 'n' breakfast)
A score of 26, made up of a single-5, single-20, single-1 in a game of x01. This is a common score in darts because players aiming for the 20 sector (which contains the highest scoring area on the board) will often accidentally hit the 1 and the 5 sectors, which are located on either side of the 20. The term comes from the typical price of a bed-and-breakfast in times gone by: 2 shillings and sixpence, or "two and six". (See also chips). Hitting the treble of each number is known as a champagne breakfast: Triple 20, triple 5 and triple 1.

Brimful of Asha (Brimful)
A score of 45. Taken from the chorus of the song "Brimful of Asha" by Cornershop ("Brimful of Asha on the 45").

Bucket (or bag) of nails
Landing all three darts in the 1. This is also known as "The Eric Bristow", who once scored three 1s in a televised tournament.

Buckshot
A throw when darts land wildly all over the board.

Bull calf
The number 33.

Bull-off
See diddle for the middle.

Bull-up
See diddle for the middle

Bullseye (or bull)
The centre of the board. (see also: single-bull and double-bull)

Bunting
Throwing darts while kneeling.

Bust
In an x01 game, hitting more points than needed to win, reaching a score of 1, or reaching zero by hitting anything other than a double or the bull. The darts do not count, the rest of the turn is forfeited, and the player begins their next turn on their prior score. A variant is the Northern Bust, in which the player's score is reset to whatever it was immediately before the last dart they threw.

== C ==
C
In a game of cricket this refers to high scores based on the number of darts scored. For example a triple-20, single-20, single-20 would be called a C-5 because "5 darts" were scored with three darts.

Carpentry darts
Darts thrown such that they miss the board entirely and hit a wooden frame which is holding the board to the wall. (See also: masonry darts)

Carolina Leaner
A player who leans as far over the oche as possible in an effort to reduce the distance of their throws. (American term)

Champagne Breakfast
Hitting triple 20, triple 1 and triple 5 in three darts. (See also breakfast.)

Champagne Shot
A score of 132 checked out by hitting inner bull, inner bull and Double 16.

Checkout
Reducing one's score to exactly zero, thus winning the leg. A final double is required to win a leg in an x01 game.

Chucker
A player who just "chucks" the darts at the board and does not aim or care.

Circle it
When a player scores a single digit (less than 10) with three darts, their teammates would shout out "Circle it!" to the scorekeeper to highlight the terrible throw. A variation on this tradition is to draw a fish around the score, often leading to aquarium-related jokes being aimed at particularly poor or unlucky players. (See also: fish)

Clock
The dartboard itself, usually in the context of round the clock.

Close out
Getting three hits on a number opened by the opponent in a game of cricket. Doubles and trebles count as two and three hits, respectively. Once a number is closed out, neither player can score points from it.

Conquistador
Going out with a bull/double bull.

Cork
The center of the board. This comes from the cork in the end of a keg where it is tapped. The ends of kegs were used for targets in the game's early days.

Cover
Aiming for an alternate triple, usually 19, when a previously thrown dart is blocking the triple 20.

Cricket
Two distinct game variations. The American game is known by many different names, such as "Mickey Mouse", outside North America, where cricket refers to a different game, which is often called "Australian Cricket".

== D ==
Daddy's bed, daddy's, daddy
See right church, wrong pew.

Dairylea darts
A throw that is 'spread' around the board, named after the cheese spread Dairylea.

Decider
The leg/set that determines the winner of a match when the score is tied. Also known as last-leg/last-set decider or deciding leg/set.

Devil
The triple-6, so called due to '666', and the fact that it is often hit in error when going for triple-13 or triple-10.

Devil's Finish
Checking out 25 (usually Single 9, Double 8), originated from a video of Ted Hankey playing.

Deming
When the dart lands on the other side of the wire of the area aimed for. Then yelling an expletive.

Destiny bull
When it is inevitable that bull will be hit. For the whole day after whoever achieves this must be referred to as 'bull'.

Diddle for the middle
A throw of a single dart to determine who throws first in the game by means of being closer to the bullseye. Also known as a "bull-off", "middle for middle", "corking" and "out for bull".

Double
The thin outer ring of the board. In standard x01 games, a double counts for two times the number hit.

Double-bull
On dartboards configured with a bullseye consisting of two concentric circles, double-bull refers to the inner circle, which is commonly red and worth 50 points. (See also: bullseye and single-bull)

Double dance
A dance done after checking out, popularised by BBC show Numberblocks, where a line of the 4 times table song is "do the double, double, double, double dance".

Double in
A variant of x01 in which a double is needed to start the game.

Double top
The double-20.

Double trouble
Not being able to hit the double needed to win the game.

Double Quincy
The double-7, named after Ajax player Quincy Promes.

Downstairs
The lower portion of the board, usually in reference to the 19s in a game of x01.

Dreaded
Hitting a 20, 1 and 5 in the same turn, coined by a group who play in the Prince Of Wales, Haslemere, Surrey.

== E ==
Easy in
Same as straight in; a game that requires no special shot to begin scoring.

Egg and Chips
Scoring 26 in three darts, through scoring a 20, 1 and 5

== F ==
Feathers
The number 33. Also may refer to flights, since early flights were made from feathers.

Fish
A score of nine or less, usually denoted by drawing a whale around the score on the scoreboard. (See also circle it and whale).

Fish and chips (or feed)
Hitting 20, 1, and 5 for 26. (see also breakfast)

Fogle
A series of castaway darts thrown with no other purpose than to irritate opponents.

Flights
The "wings" at the end of a dart that help it fly straight and land point first. Also known as feathers.

== G ==
Game on
Called by the referee to advise all players that the match has now started.

Game shot
Called by the referee to signify that the leg winning double has been hit.

Goldilocks
Hitting the double next to the one being aimed for.

Granny
A loss without scoring, see shut out.

Greenpeace dart
The third dart thrown, when it manages to avoid scoring a FISH or a WHALE which was looking likely after the first two darts had been thrown. So called because the player is said to have "saved the fish" or "saved the whale".

== H ==
Hat-trick
A score of three bullseyes. Also known as the Alan Evans shot, who scored three bulleyes during a match on numerous occasions.

He doesn't want it
A cry from the crowd in recognition of the fact that one of the players is struggling to successfully complete a leg.

High ton
A score equal to or greater than 150.

Hold
Winning a leg as the player to go first at the start of that leg. Also referred to in full as 'hold of throw'.

Hot toddy
Refers to a player who throws well despite intoxication.

== I ==
Island
The actual playable area of a dart board (inside the doubles ring). Missing this area entirely is sometimes referred to as "off the island".

Ichigo-byo
In Japanese it means "Strawberry Disease" but taken apart it, the word strawberry: "ichigo" can mean 1 (ichi) and 5 (go). Japanese players use this term for when they aim at 20 but hit a 5 and a 1 along with the intended 20. It is equivalent to the English term breakfast.

Irish Ton
Two single 1s and a triple 1; ie: it would be worth 100 if it were five 20s instead of five 1s.

Iron Man
Going out with a double/double.

== J ==
Jugging
Checking out while the opponent's score is 200 or greater. Based on a custom in social darts that requires a player defeated in this manner to drink a jug of beer without stopping.

== K ==
Killer
A game variant where a number of players "own" a number on the dartboard and compete to build up "lives" (by hitting that number) until a threshold is reached (usually 4 or 6) before attempting to "kill" other players by removing the lives they have built up (by hitting those other players' numbers) until a single player is left.

== L ==
Leg
One game of a match. Some professional matches are made up of a number of sets, each of which is split into legs.

Leg shot
Signifies that a player has completed (won) the "leg".

Lipstick
Usually refers to triple 20, as this portion of the board is commonly red in color and resembles an upper lip, but may refer to any red double or triple.

Low Ton
A score less than 150 but greater than 100.

Last Dart Dave
First two darts miss the mark, however, the last dart hits the intended target.

== M ==
Mad house
The double-1. At least two explanations for the term have been proffered; because it can drive one crazy trying to hit one in a game of x01, or because it is impossible to "get out" of the mad house - once a player has a score of 2 the only way to finish the game is by hitting a double-1.

Marker
A dart that has landed off target but very close, the dart is used as guide.

Martial Arts
Cockney rhyming slang for "darts".

Masonry darts
Darts thrown such that they miss the board entirely and hit the wall instead (i.e. even worse than carpentry darts).

Match dart
A dart thrown at a double to win the match.

Maximum
A score of 180, achieved by hitting the treble-20 with all three throws in a single turn.

Maximum check-out
A score of 170 to end a game (triple-20, triple-20, inner bull)

Meatball
Throwing the dart underhanded and backwards into the board.

Mickey Mouse
See cricket.

Middle for middle
See diddle for the middle.

Monger
A person who deliberately scores many more points than needed to win the game.

Mugs away
Loser of the previous game goes first in the next game.

Murphy
A score of single-5, single-20, single-1 in a game of x01. Based on Murphy's Law. (See also: breakfast) and Fish and chips (or feed)

== N ==
Nail
Another word for 1. See also: bucket of nails and ton of nails.

Nine darter
When a player completes a game of 501 in nine throws, the minimum required to do so. This is a very rare event. There is usually a cash prize for professionals throwing a televised nine-darter.

Nish
When a player finishes with two singles of the same value.

No sense of humor
A traditional cry from opponents or spectators when a player deliberately switches to aiming at a different part of the board in order to avoid an embarrassing score such as a fish or a wanker's fifty.

Not old
A score of 37 (usually by hitting a 20, a 5 and a 12). The phrase is believed to have its origins in a Monty Python sketch (King Arthur & Dennis, in "Monty Python & the Holy Grail").

== O ==
Oche
The line from behind which the players throw. They may stand on any portion of the oche and/or lean forward over it if desired, but no part of either foot may extend past the edge closer to the dartboard.

Open
Hitting a designated number (usually 15-20) or the bullseye a total of three times in a game of cricket. Doubles and trebles count as two and three hits, respectively. Once a player has opened a number, they can score points from it until the opponent has also hit it three times (see close out above). Neither player can score from a number until it has been opened.

Out chart
A list of the optimal checkouts for all numbers from 2 to 170. Often provided with a newly purchased board or set of darts, in the form of a small printed card.

Out for bull
See diddle for the middle.

ONE HUNDRED AND EIGHTY!
Called by the referee to announce that a player has scored a maximum.

== P ==
Perfect game
See nine darter.

Perfect score
See maximum.

Perfect finish
See maximum check-out.

Popcorn
An incident in which one dart lands close enough to another one to knock its flights off.

PPD
Average "points per dart" thrown. See also average.

Pub score
Achieved by hitting 20, 5 and 1, while aiming for the treble 20.

Pudding darts
Term used by the Dutch to describe a poor visit to the board.

Punting
The illegal act of touching the board with a dart's point after already retrieving it from the board.

Peg out
Australian term for hitting the required double to finish an 01 game.

Precious Mountain
Australian term when throwing the last dart in a win loss scenario.

== Q ==
Quadro
A dartboard which was first manufactured in the 1990s. The board has an additional scoring ring located between the treble ring and the bullseye which is worth quadruple points. On this board the maximum score is 240, the highest outshot is 210 and a seven-dart finish is possible from a 501 start. It was used during the WDC UK Matchplay event, but thereafter it fell into disuse in tournament play. Harrows originally stopped manufacturing the board in 2000; a new version however was brought back into manufacture in 2024.

== R ==
=== Redeemer ===
A dart, (often a T20) that "redeems" two previous poor efforts.

=== Right church, wrong pew (or right house, wrong bed) ===
Term for hitting a double or triple, but the wrong number. Also known as daddy's bed.

=== Robin Hood ===
Throwing a dart into the shaft of another making it stick, sometimes splitting the flight. The darts not touching the board do not count for score.

=== Round nine ===
Throwing three triples that close (before being closed by opponent) or point in one turn in cricket.

=== Round the clock ===
Any of a number of game variants where players compete to be the first to hit all the sectors on the board in an agreed order, usually numerical finishing with the 20, although sometimes with the outer bull followed by the bull. In some versions hitting a double entitles the player to skip the next number, with a triple entitling the player to skip two numbers. Also commonly played by single players as a form of practice; also known as around the world.

== S ==
Scroat
A dart that is aimed for triple 20, but ends up in double 20.

Scud
Aiming for something and hitting something else that either marks or points.

Scotch
Another name for a game of darts

Set
A scoring method used in many tournaments. The first player to win a specified number of legs (individual games) wins the set, and the first to win a specified number of sets wins the match.

Seeding
The placement of player(s) automatically in a tournament where some have to qualify, or automatic placement in later rounds.

Shaft
The part of a dart behind the barrel where the flights are mounted.

Shanghai
Hitting a single, double, and treble of the same number on one turn. Also refers to a game in which players throw at each number on the board in turn, scoring points, with the first player to hit a Shanghai being declared the winner. If no player achieves a Shanghai, then the player with the most points wins. In some variants of the game, achieving a Shanghai awards bonus points instead of an automatic win. Variations on the term include Little Shanghai (hitting a single, double, and treble of three different numbers), Big Shanghai or Shanghai Noon (single/double/treble 20), and Short Shanghai (single and double bull on one turn). Any such variation may be used to check out in a standard game, as long as the double is hit last.

Sharkey
A non-registered player who assumes a false identity in order to fill in for an absent player in a league game.

Shotgun blast
All three darts thrown at one time.

Shropshire Bull
A method of winning a non-competitive game in which the thrower declares his/her intent to check out by hitting only the bullseye and then does so.

Shut out
Losing a game without scoring any points.

Single-bull
On dartboards configured with a bullseye consisting of two concentric circles, single-bull refers to the outer circle, which is commonly green and worth 25 points. This is also known as the 'outer bull'. The inner circle is commonly red and worth 50 points. There is speculation to whether this is called the bullseye or indeed called the target. See also: bullseye and double-bull.

Skunked
Losing a game without scoring any points.

Slop
Darts that score, but not where the thrower intended; also known as a scud.

Smoke Break
Another name for a game of darts.

Soft-tip darts
A variant of darts where the point of the dart is made of plastic instead of the standard steel tip, commonly played on electronic darts machines.

Spider
The metal web that divides the dartboard into sections.

Splash
throwing two or more darts at the board at the same time. Hitting a scoring number that was not the intended target.

Spray and pray
Darts thrown aimlessly.

Spud
Another name for a game of darts.

Sticks
The darts themselves.

Straight in
A game that requires no special shot to begin scoring (also "straight off").

Straight out
A game that requires no special shot to finish a game. i.e. Players on 15 can hit the S15 to win instead of going S7, D4.

Striking oil / Striking Iraq
Hitting a double bull when diddling for the middle. The former term stems from the black centre to the bullseye of some modern dartboards; the latter refers to the fact that the country of Iraq has large crude oil reserves.

== T ==
Target
The centre of the board, though some call it the bullseye there is speculation to the real name.

That's darts
A widely used term by television commentators when something unexpected or extraordinary occurs during a game.

Three in a bed
Three darts in the same number, no matter double or triple.

Tin Hat
Getting beat in a game of double in, without hitting a starting double. Drawing a hat with a T in the losing players score when the game has ended, symbols getting ‘tin hatted’.

Throw line
See oche.

Toe line
See oche.

Ton 80
Three darts in the triple 20 which score 180 points; only in x01 games. See maximum.

Ton
A score of 100 in a game of x01. Scores over 100 would be called a "ton-whatever" for example, a ton-thirty would be a score of 130.

Ton of nails
A score of 5 where all three darts fell in the 1 bed with 1 dart in the triple 1.

Top banana, top of the shop, tops
Double 20. "Top banana" is an exclamation often used to mark a double-20 throw that wins a match.

Triple (or treble)
The thin inner ring of the board, it usually counts for three times the number hit.

Triple in, triple out
An x01 game that requires a triple throw to start and win.

Turkey
Scoring 30 points in one turn. Named for a "turkey" in the game of tenpin bowling (three consecutive strikes, worth 10 points each).

== U ==
Upstairs
The upper half of the board

== V ==
Veg Patch
Usually refers to hitting the triple either side of the triple 20 (triple 1 or triple 5) but may refer to any green bed on the board.
Velocity
Refers to the speed at which a dart travels before hitting the board.

== W ==
Wanker's fifty
Crude term for scoring 50 by hitting single 20, single 18 and single 12 with three darts, so called because often poor players achieve it when aiming for the triple 20.

Wanker's off
When the losing player starts the next leg - similar to Mugs away.

Wet feet (or paddling)
Standing too close to the board, with any part of a foot past the leading edge of the oche. Leaning over the oche is allowed, however.

Whale
A score of nine or less (i.e. averaging 3 or less per dart). Usually denoted by drawing a whale around the score on the scoreboard.

White horse
Scoring three triples in cricket on different numbers.

Wire
Darts that just miss where one aimed but on the other side of the spider.

Workin' man's darts
When a player closes a single number using all 3 darts in cricket.

== Z ==
Zubi checkout
Using all three darts in a turn to checkout from 40-99 ending a game of x01. Widely used in Wiltshire, UK.
