= 2023 Grand Slam of Darts =

2023 Mr Vegas Grand Slam of Darts

Tournament information
- Dates: 11–19 November 2023
- Venue: Aldersley Leisure Village
- Location: Wolverhampton, England
- Organisation(s): Professional Darts Corporation (PDC)
- Format: Legs
- Prize fund: £650,000
- Winner's share: £150,000
- Nine-dart finish: Ryan Searle
- High checkout: 170; Krzysztof Ratajski; Luke Humphries; Rob Cross

Champion(s)
- Luke Humphries

The 2023 Grand Slam of Darts (known for sponsorship reasons as the Mr Vegas Grand Slam of Darts) was the seventeenth staging of the Grand Slam of Darts, organised by the Professional Darts Corporation. The event took place at the Aldersley Leisure Village, Wolverhampton, 11–19 November 2023.

Michael Smith was the defending champion, after defeating Nathan Aspinall 16–5 in the 2022 final, however, he was eliminated during the group stage. Luke Humphries won his second major and first Grand Slam title by defeating Rob Cross 16–8 in the final. Humphries won every match he played in the tournament, hitting six 100+ averages in the process.

Ryan Searle hit a nine-dart finish during his group-stage win over Nathan Rafferty.

== Prize money ==
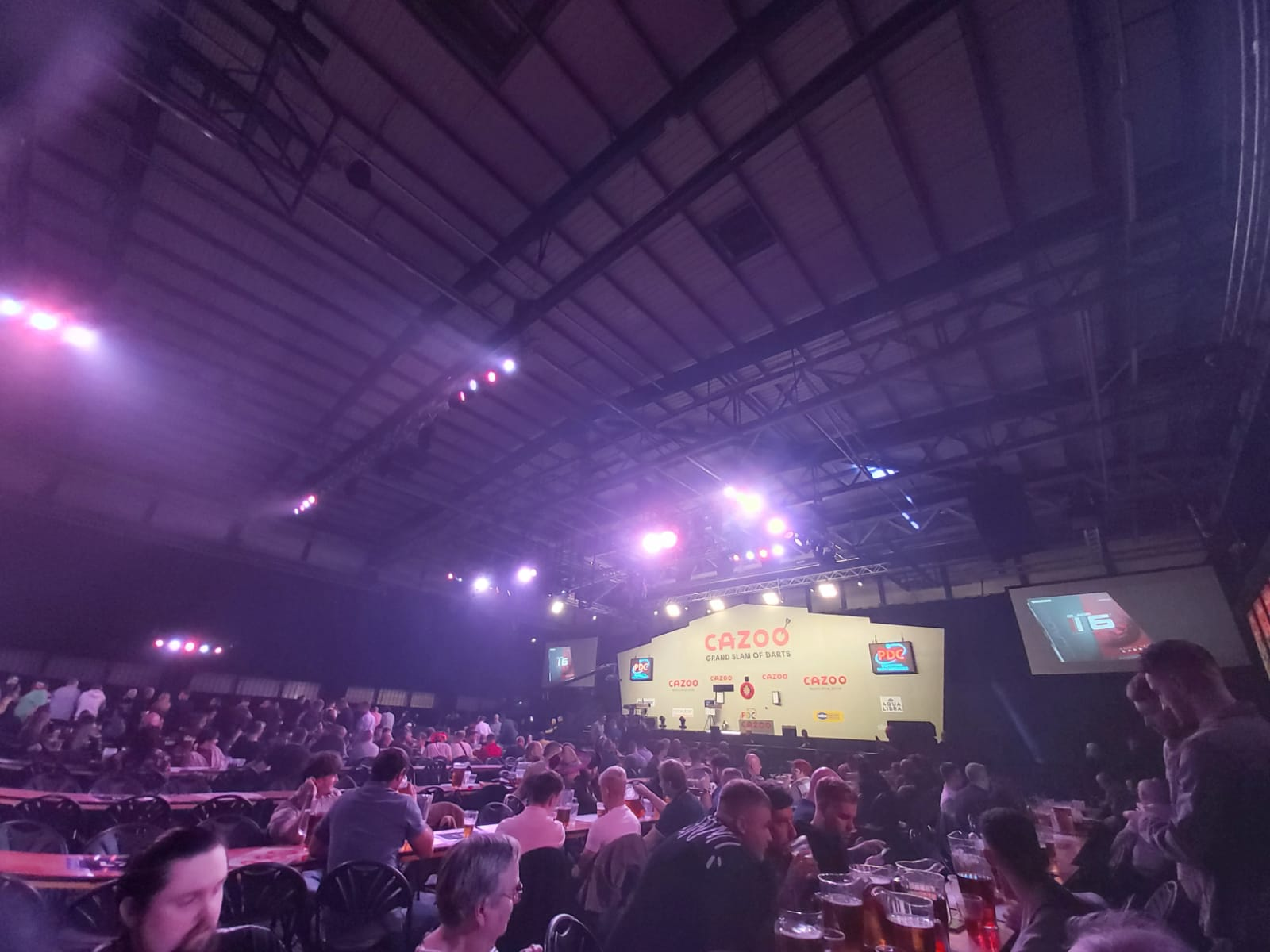
The quarter finals of the Grand Slam of Darts 2022 at Aldersley Leisure Village, Wolverhampton

The prize fund for the Grand Slam remained the same as the year before at £650,000.

Position (num. of players)		Prize money (Total: £650,000)
Winner	(1)	£150,000
Runner-up	(1)	£70,000
Semi-finalists	(2)	£50,000
Quarter-finalists	(4)	£25,000
Last 16	(8)	£12,250
Third in group	(8)	£8,000
Fourth in group	(8)	£5,000
Group winner bonus	(8)	£3,500
Nine Dart Finish	n/a	£10,000

== Qualification ==
=== PDC Qualifying Tournaments ===
PDC Main Tournaments
Tournament	Year	Position	Player	Qualifiers
PDC World Darts Championship	2023	Winner	Michael Smith	Michael Smith; Michael van Gerwen; Nathan Aspinall; Luke Humphries; Chris Dobey; Andrew Gilding; Peter Wright; Gerwyn Price; Jonny Clayton; Rob Cross; James Wade; Gary Anderson
Grand Slam of Darts	2022	Winner	Michael Smith	Michael Smith; Michael van Gerwen; Nathan Aspinall; Luke Humphries; Chris Dobey; Andrew Gilding; Peter Wright; Gerwyn Price; Jonny Clayton; Rob Cross; James Wade; Gary Anderson
Premier League Darts	2023	Winner	Michael van Gerwen	Michael Smith; Michael van Gerwen; Nathan Aspinall; Luke Humphries; Chris Dobey; Andrew Gilding; Peter Wright; Gerwyn Price; Jonny Clayton; Rob Cross; James Wade; Gary Anderson
World Matchplay	2023	Winner	Nathan Aspinall	Michael Smith; Michael van Gerwen; Nathan Aspinall; Luke Humphries; Chris Dobey; Andrew Gilding; Peter Wright; Gerwyn Price; Jonny Clayton; Rob Cross; James Wade; Gary Anderson
World Grand Prix	2023	Winner	Luke Humphries	Michael Smith; Michael van Gerwen; Nathan Aspinall; Luke Humphries; Chris Dobey; Andrew Gilding; Peter Wright; Gerwyn Price; Jonny Clayton; Rob Cross; James Wade; Gary Anderson
Masters	2023	Winner	Chris Dobey	Michael Smith; Michael van Gerwen; Nathan Aspinall; Luke Humphries; Chris Dobey; Andrew Gilding; Peter Wright; Gerwyn Price; Jonny Clayton; Rob Cross; James Wade; Gary Anderson
UK Open	2023	Winner	Andrew Gilding	Michael Smith; Michael van Gerwen; Nathan Aspinall; Luke Humphries; Chris Dobey; Andrew Gilding; Peter Wright; Gerwyn Price; Jonny Clayton; Rob Cross; James Wade; Gary Anderson
European Championship	2023	Winner	Peter Wright	Michael Smith; Michael van Gerwen; Nathan Aspinall; Luke Humphries; Chris Dobey; Andrew Gilding; Peter Wright; Gerwyn Price; Jonny Clayton; Rob Cross; James Wade; Gary Anderson
Players Championship Finals	2022	Winner	Michael van Gerwen	Michael Smith; Michael van Gerwen; Nathan Aspinall; Luke Humphries; Chris Dobey; Andrew Gilding; Peter Wright; Gerwyn Price; Jonny Clayton; Rob Cross; James Wade; Gary Anderson
World Series of Darts Finals	2023	Winner	Michael van Gerwen	Michael Smith; Michael van Gerwen; Nathan Aspinall; Luke Humphries; Chris Dobey; Andrew Gilding; Peter Wright; Gerwyn Price; Jonny Clayton; Rob Cross; James Wade; Gary Anderson
PDC World Cup of Darts	2023	Winners	Gerwyn Price; Jonny Clayton	Michael Smith; Michael van Gerwen; Nathan Aspinall; Luke Humphries; Chris Dobey; Andrew Gilding; Peter Wright; Gerwyn Price; Jonny Clayton; Rob Cross; James Wade; Gary Anderson
PDC World Darts Championship	2023	Runner-up	Michael van Gerwen	Michael Smith; Michael van Gerwen; Nathan Aspinall; Luke Humphries; Chris Dobey; Andrew Gilding; Peter Wright; Gerwyn Price; Jonny Clayton; Rob Cross; James Wade; Gary Anderson
Grand Slam of Darts	2022	Runner-up	Nathan Aspinall	Michael Smith; Michael van Gerwen; Nathan Aspinall; Luke Humphries; Chris Dobey; Andrew Gilding; Peter Wright; Gerwyn Price; Jonny Clayton; Rob Cross; James Wade; Gary Anderson
Premier League Darts	2023	Runner-up	Gerwyn Price	Michael Smith; Michael van Gerwen; Nathan Aspinall; Luke Humphries; Chris Dobey; Andrew Gilding; Peter Wright; Gerwyn Price; Jonny Clayton; Rob Cross; James Wade; Gary Anderson
World Matchplay	2023	Runner-up	Jonny Clayton	Michael Smith; Michael van Gerwen; Nathan Aspinall; Luke Humphries; Chris Dobey; Andrew Gilding; Peter Wright; Gerwyn Price; Jonny Clayton; Rob Cross; James Wade; Gary Anderson
World Grand Prix	2023	Runner-up	Gerwyn Price	Michael Smith; Michael van Gerwen; Nathan Aspinall; Luke Humphries; Chris Dobey; Andrew Gilding; Peter Wright; Gerwyn Price; Jonny Clayton; Rob Cross; James Wade; Gary Anderson
Masters	2023	Runner-up	Rob Cross	Michael Smith; Michael van Gerwen; Nathan Aspinall; Luke Humphries; Chris Dobey; Andrew Gilding; Peter Wright; Gerwyn Price; Jonny Clayton; Rob Cross; James Wade; Gary Anderson
UK Open	2023	Runner-up	Michael van Gerwen	Michael Smith; Michael van Gerwen; Nathan Aspinall; Luke Humphries; Chris Dobey; Andrew Gilding; Peter Wright; Gerwyn Price; Jonny Clayton; Rob Cross; James Wade; Gary Anderson
European Championship	2023	Runner-up	James Wade	Michael Smith; Michael van Gerwen; Nathan Aspinall; Luke Humphries; Chris Dobey; Andrew Gilding; Peter Wright; Gerwyn Price; Jonny Clayton; Rob Cross; James Wade; Gary Anderson
Players Championship Finals	2022	Runner-up	Rob Cross	Michael Smith; Michael van Gerwen; Nathan Aspinall; Luke Humphries; Chris Dobey; Andrew Gilding; Peter Wright; Gerwyn Price; Jonny Clayton; Rob Cross; James Wade; Gary Anderson
World Series of Darts Finals	2023	Runner-up	Nathan Aspinall	Michael Smith; Michael van Gerwen; Nathan Aspinall; Luke Humphries; Chris Dobey; Andrew Gilding; Peter Wright; Gerwyn Price; Jonny Clayton; Rob Cross; James Wade; Gary Anderson
PDC World Cup of Darts	2023	Runners-Up	Peter Wright; Gary Anderson	Michael Smith; Michael van Gerwen; Nathan Aspinall; Luke Humphries; Chris Dobey; Andrew Gilding; Peter Wright; Gerwyn Price; Jonny Clayton; Rob Cross; James Wade; Gary Anderson
Note: Players in italics had already qualified for the tournament.				Michael Smith; Michael van Gerwen; Nathan Aspinall; Luke Humphries; Chris Dobey; Andrew Gilding; Peter Wright; Gerwyn Price; Jonny Clayton; Rob Cross; James Wade; Gary Anderson

=== European Tour ===
If the list of qualifiers from the main tournaments produced fewer than the required number of players (16), the field will be filled from the reserve lists. The first list consisted of the winners from 2023 European Tour events, in which the winners were ordered firstly by number of wins, then Order of Merit position order at the cut-off date.

PDC European Tour
Tournament	Event	Position	Player	Qualifiers
2023 European Tour
2023 European Tour	Baltic Sea Darts Open	Winner	Dave Chisnall	Dave Chisnall; Krzysztof Ratajski; Ricardo Pietreczko
2023 European Tour	European Darts Open	Winner	Gerwyn Price	Dave Chisnall; Krzysztof Ratajski; Ricardo Pietreczko
2023 European Tour	International Darts Open	Winner	Gerwyn Price (2)	Dave Chisnall; Krzysztof Ratajski; Ricardo Pietreczko
2023 European Tour	German Darts Grand Prix	Winner	Michael Smith	Dave Chisnall; Krzysztof Ratajski; Ricardo Pietreczko
2023 European Tour	Austrian Darts Open	Winner	Jonny Clayton	Dave Chisnall; Krzysztof Ratajski; Ricardo Pietreczko
2023 European Tour	Dutch Darts Championship	Winner	Dave Chisnall (2)	Dave Chisnall; Krzysztof Ratajski; Ricardo Pietreczko
2023 European Tour	Belgian Darts Open	Winner	Michael van Gerwen	Dave Chisnall; Krzysztof Ratajski; Ricardo Pietreczko
2023 European Tour	Czech Darts Open	Winner	Peter Wright	Dave Chisnall; Krzysztof Ratajski; Ricardo Pietreczko
2023 European Tour	European Darts Grand Prix	Winner	Rob Cross	Dave Chisnall; Krzysztof Ratajski; Ricardo Pietreczko
2023 European Tour	European Darts Matchplay	Winner	Luke Humphries	Dave Chisnall; Krzysztof Ratajski; Ricardo Pietreczko
2023 European Tour	German Darts Open	Winner	Krzysztof Ratajski	Dave Chisnall; Krzysztof Ratajski; Ricardo Pietreczko
2023 European Tour	Hungarian Darts Trophy	Winner	Dave Chisnall (3)	Dave Chisnall; Krzysztof Ratajski; Ricardo Pietreczko
2023 European Tour	German Darts Championship	Winner	Ricardo Pietreczko	Dave Chisnall; Krzysztof Ratajski; Ricardo Pietreczko
Note: Players in italics had already qualified for the tournament.				Dave Chisnall; Krzysztof Ratajski; Ricardo Pietreczko

=== Players Championships ===
If there are still not enough qualifiers after European Tour events are added, the winners of 2023 Players Championship events will be added, firstly in order by number of wins, then in Order of Merit order.

PDC Pro Tour
Tournament	Event	Position	Player	Qualifiers
2023 PDC Pro Tour
2023 PDC Pro Tour	Players Championship 1	Winner	Ryan Searle	Dirk van Duijvenbode
2023 PDC Pro Tour	Players Championship 2	Winner	Danny Noppert	Dirk van Duijvenbode
2023 PDC Pro Tour	Players Championship 3	Winner	Kim Huybrechts	Dirk van Duijvenbode
2023 PDC Pro Tour	Players Championship 4	Winner	Dirk van Duijvenbode	Dirk van Duijvenbode
2023 PDC Pro Tour	Players Championship 5	Winner	Ross Smith	Dirk van Duijvenbode
2023 PDC Pro Tour	Players Championship 6	Winner	Dirk van Duijvenbode (2)	Dirk van Duijvenbode
2023 PDC Pro Tour	Players Championship 7	Winner	Michael van Gerwen	Dirk van Duijvenbode
2023 PDC Pro Tour	Players Championship 8	Winner	Gary Anderson	Dirk van Duijvenbode
2023 PDC Pro Tour	Players Championship 9	Winner	Krzysztof Ratajski	Dirk van Duijvenbode
2023 PDC Pro Tour	Players Championship 10	Winner	Dirk van Duijvenbode (3)	Dirk van Duijvenbode
2023 PDC Pro Tour	Players Championship 11	Winner	Rob Cross	Dirk van Duijvenbode
2023 PDC Pro Tour	Players Championship 12	Winner	Jonny Clayton	Dirk van Duijvenbode
2023 PDC Pro Tour	Players Championship 13	Winner	Michael Smith	Dirk van Duijvenbode
2023 PDC Pro Tour	Players Championship 14	Winner	Damon Heta	Dirk van Duijvenbode
2023 PDC Pro Tour	Players Championship 15	Winner	Luke Humphries	Dirk van Duijvenbode
2023 PDC Pro Tour	Players Championship 16	Winner	Damon Heta (2)	Dirk van Duijvenbode
2023 PDC Pro Tour	Players Championship 17	Winner	Gerwyn Price	Dirk van Duijvenbode
2023 PDC Pro Tour	Players Championship 18	Winner	Gerwyn Price (2)	Dirk van Duijvenbode
2023 PDC Pro Tour	Players Championship 19	Winner	Callan Rydz	Dirk van Duijvenbode
2023 PDC Pro Tour	Players Championship 20	Winner	Luke Humphries (2)	Dirk van Duijvenbode
2023 PDC Pro Tour	Players Championship 21	Winner	Gerwyn Price (3)	Dirk van Duijvenbode
2023 PDC Pro Tour	Players Championship 22	Winner	Danny Noppert (2)	Dirk van Duijvenbode
2023 PDC Pro Tour	Players Championship 23	Winner	Dave Chisnall	Dirk van Duijvenbode
2023 PDC Pro Tour	Players Championship 24	Winner	Gary Anderson (2)	Dirk van Duijvenbode
2023 PDC Pro Tour	Players Championship 25	Winner	Gary Anderson (3)	Dirk van Duijvenbode
2023 PDC Pro Tour	Players Championship 26	Winner	Ryan Joyce	Dirk van Duijvenbode
2023 PDC Pro Tour	Players Championship 27	Winner	Radek Szagański	Dirk van Duijvenbode
2023 PDC Pro Tour	Players Championship 28	Winner	Ross Smith (2)	Dirk van Duijvenbode
2023 PDC Pro Tour	Players Championship 29	Winner	Gerwyn Price (4)	Dirk van Duijvenbode
2023 PDC Pro Tour	Players Championship 30	Winner	Dave Chisnall (2)	Dirk van Duijvenbode
Note: Players in italics had already qualified for the tournament.				Dirk van Duijvenbode

=== PDC Qualifying Event ===
A further eight places in the Grand Slam of Darts will be filled by qualifiers from a PDC Tour Card Holder qualifier to be held on 3 November in Barnsley.

These are the qualifiers:

- Danny Noppert
- Stephen Bunting
- Ryan Searle
- Nathan Rafferty
- Damon Heta
- Steve Lennon
- Martijn Kleermaker
- Brendan Dolan

=== Additional Qualifiers ===
The winners of these tournaments and tours also qualified for the tournament.

Tournament	Year	Position	Player
PDC World Youth Championship	2022	Winner	Josh Rock
PDC World Youth Championship	2022	Runner-up	Nathan Girvan
PDC Challenge Tour	2023	Order of Merit Winner	Berry van Peer
PDC Development Tour	2023	Order of Merit Winner	Gian van Veen
Women's World Matchplay	2023	Winner	Beau Greaves
PDC Women's Series	2023	Order of Merit Runner-up	Fallon Sherrock
PDC Asian Championship	2023	Winner	Haruki Muramatsu
CDC Continental Cup	2023	Winner	Stowe Buntz

== Pools ==
Pool A	Pool B	Pool C	Pool D
(Seeded Players)	(Qualifiers)		
Michael Smith (1); Peter Wright (2); Michael van Gerwen (3); Luke Humphries (4); Gerwyn Price (5); Nathan Aspinall (6); Danny Noppert (7); Jonny Clayton (8)	Rob Cross; Dirk van Duijvenbode; Dave Chisnall; Damon Heta; James Wade; Ryan Searle; Chris Dobey; Andrew Gilding	Gary Anderson; Stephen Bunting; Krzysztof Ratajski; Josh Rock; Brendan Dolan; Ricardo Pietreczko; Martijn Kleermaker; Gian van Veen	Steve Lennon; Nathan Rafferty; Berry van Peer; Stowe Buntz; Nathan Girvan; Beau Greaves; Haruki Muramatsu; Fallon Sherrock

== Group stage ==
All group matches were best of nine legs
After three games, the top two in each group qualified for the knock-out stage
If two or more players were tied on points, the positions were determined first by leg difference, and then the result between the two players.

NB: P = Played; W = Won; L = Lost; LF = Legs for; LA = Legs against; +/− = Plus/minus record, in relation to legs; Pts = Points; Status = Qualified to knockout stage

=== Group A ===
Pos.	Player	P	W	L	LF	LA	+/−	Pts	Status
1	James Wade	3	2	1	14	8	+6	4	Q
2	Krzysztof Ratajski	3	2	1	14	10	+4	4	Q
3	Michael Smith	3	2	1	11	11	0	4	Eliminated
4	Nathan Girvan	3	0	3	5	15	–10	0	Eliminated

11 November

James Wade 96.46	4–5	Krzysztof Ratajski 99.30
Michael Smith 98.91	5–2	Nathan Girvan 84.00

12 November

James Wade 84.12	5–2	Nathan Girvan 78.66
Michael Smith 88.99	5–4	Krzysztof Ratajski 101.00

13 November

Krzysztof Ratajski 89.39	5–1	Nathan Girvan 78.69
Michael Smith 92.20	1–5	James Wade 90.49

=== Group B ===
Pos.	Player	P	W	L	LF	LA	+/−	Pts	Status
1	Josh Rock	3	3	0	15	4	+11	6	Q
2	Chris Dobey	3	2	1	12	12	0	4	Q
3	Jonny Clayton	3	1	2	9	12	–3	2	Eliminated
4	Berry van Peer	3	0	3	7	15	–8	0	Eliminated

11 November

Chris Dobey 85.81	2–5	Josh Rock 91.98
Jonny Clayton 90.59	5–2	Berry van Peer 92.89

12 November

Chris Dobey 92.72	5–4	Berry van Peer 93.11
Jonny Clayton 82.59	1–5	Josh Rock 91.71

13 November

Josh Rock 84.24	5–1	Berry van Peer 84.79
Jonny Clayton 90.73	3–5	Chris Dobey 96.74

=== Group C ===
Pos.	Player	P	W	L	LF	LA	+/−	Pts	Status
1	Luke Humphries	3	3	0	15	4	+11	6	Q
2	Gary Anderson	3	2	1	11	10	+1	4	Q
3	Dirk van Duijvenbode	3	1	2	10	12	–2	2	Eliminated
4	Steve Lennon (Q)	3	0	3	5	15	–10	0	Eliminated

11 November

Dirk van Duijvenbode 85.63	4–5	Gary Anderson 96.37
Luke Humphries 100.51	5–2	Steve Lennon 96.13

12 November

Dirk van Duijvenbode 83.86	5–2	Steve Lennon 84.08
Luke Humphries 100.87	5–1	Gary Anderson 93.51

13 November

Gary Anderson 102.77	5–1	Steve Lennon 85.86
Luke Humphries 101.93	5–1	Dirk van Duijvenbode 77.06

=== Group D ===
Pos.	Player	P	W	L	LF	LA	+/−	Pts	Status
1	Gerwyn Price	3	3	0	15	2	+13	6	Q
2	Ryan Searle (Q)	3	2	1	10	12	–2	4	Q
3	Nathan Rafferty (Q)	3	1	2	9	12	–3	2	Eliminated
4	Gian van Veen	3	0	3	7	15	–8	0	Eliminated

11 November

Ryan Searle 91.24	5–4	Gian van Veen 89.96
Gerwyn Price 95.31	5–1	Nathan Rafferty 95.68

12 November

Gian van Veen 94.63	2–5	Nathan Rafferty 103.09
Gerwyn Price 110.51	5–0	Ryan Searle 94.67

13 November

Gerwyn Price 112.30	5–1	Gian van Veen 99.04
Ryan Searle 99.25	5–3	Nathan Rafferty 87.19

=== Group E ===
Pos.	Player	P	W	L	LF	LA	+/−	Pts	Status
1	Stowe Buntz	3	2	1	14	9	+5	4	Q
2	Stephen Bunting (Q)	3	2	1	13	11	+1	4	Q
3	Dave Chisnall	3	1	2	13	14	–1	2	Eliminated
4	Peter Wright	3	1	2	9	14	–5	2	Eliminated

11 November

Dave Chisnall 99.91	4–5	Stephen Bunting 95.93
Peter Wright 81.00	1–5	Stowe Buntz 102.28

12 November

Peter Wright 93.85	5–4	Dave Chisnall 88.93
Stephen Bunting 95.87	3–5	Stowe Buntz 88.46

14 November

Dave Chisnall 90.68	5–4	Stowe Buntz 88.79
Peter Wright 92.90	3–5	Stephen Bunting 99.38

=== Group F ===
Pos.	Player	P	W	L	LF	LA	+/−	Pts	Status
1	Danny Noppert (Q)	3	3	0	15	10	+5	6	Q
2	Andrew Gilding	3	2	1	13	9	+4	4	Q
3	Brendan Dolan (Q)	3	1	2	12	12	0	2	Eliminated
4	Haruki Muramatsu	3	0	3	6	15	–9	0	Eliminated

11 November

Andrew Gilding 89.72	5–3	Brendan Dolan 85.32
Danny Noppert 86.15	5–3	Haruki Muramatsu 90.41

12 November

Brendan Dolan 97.46	5–2	Haruki Muramatsu 86.00
Danny Noppert 96.91	5–3	Andrew Gilding 92.49

14 November

Andrew Gilding 99.82	5–1	Haruki Muramatsu 85.10
Danny Noppert 86.62	5–4	Brendan Dolan 88.85

=== Group G ===
Pos.	Player	P	W	L	LF	LA	+/−	Pts	Status
1	Michael van Gerwen	3	3	0	15	9	+6	6	Q
2	Rob Cross	3	2	1	14	11	+2	4	Q
3	Fallon Sherrock	3	1	2	8	14	–6	2	Eliminated
4	Martijn Kleermaker (Q)	3	0	3	12	15	–3	0	Eliminated

11 November

Rob Cross 96.39	5–4	Martijn Kleermaker 89.64
Michael van Gerwen 101.30	5–1	Fallon Sherrock 92.67

12 November

Martijn Kleermaker 87.48	4–5	Fallon Sherrock 85.90
Michael van Gerwen 94.58	5–4	Rob Cross 97.19

14 November

Rob Cross 98.36	5–2	Fallon Sherrock 88.22
Michael van Gerwen 90.27	5–4	Martijn Kleermaker 81.10

=== Group H ===
Pos.	Player	P	W	L	LF	LA	+/−	Pts	Status
1	Nathan Aspinall	3	2	1	14	11	+3	4	Q
2	Damon Heta (Q)	3	2	1	12	13	–1	4	Q
3	Beau Greaves	3	1	2	13	11	+2	2	Eliminated
4	Ricardo Pietreczko	3	1	2	10	14	–4	2	Eliminated

11 November

Damon Heta 98.40	5–4	Ricardo Pietreczko 92.44
Nathan Aspinall 97.12	5–4	Beau Greaves 88.10

12 November

Ricardo Pietreczko 93.69	1–5	Beau Greaves 95.57
Nathan Aspinall 94.83	5–2	Damon Heta 90.37

14 November

Damon Heta 92.96	5–4	Beau Greaves 90.94
Nathan Aspinall 82.71	4–5	Ricardo Pietreczko 87.82

== Knockout stage ==
Second round (best of 19 legs); 15–16 November
A1	James Wade 94.56	10
B2	Chris Dobey 96.46	8
B1	Josh Rock 97.38	10
A2	Krzysztof Ratajski 98.48	5
C1	Luke Humphries 105.42 (4)	10
D2	Ryan Searle 98.82	7
D1	Gerwyn Price 103.54 (5)	6
C2	Gary Anderson 104.96	10
E1	Stowe Buntz 88.06	10
F2	Andrew Gilding 91.74	5
F1	Danny Noppert 85.41 (7)	4
E2	Stephen Bunting 90.83	10
G1	Michael van Gerwen 94.38 (3)	7
H2	Damon Heta 91.23	10
H1	Nathan Aspinall 103.44 (6)	8
G2	Rob Cross 103.97	10

Quarter-finals (best of 31 legs); 17–18 November
A1	James Wade 95.56	16
B1	Josh Rock 101.31	15
C1	Luke Humphries 103.56 (4)	16
C2	Gary Anderson 99.61	14
E1	Stowe Buntz 89.87	8
E2	Stephen Bunting 96.79	16
H2	Damon Heta 92.11	6
G2	Rob Cross 98.18	16

Semi-finals (best of 31 legs); 19 November
A1	James Wade 89.45	10
C1	Luke Humphries 95.80 (4)	16
E2	Stephen Bunting 95.34	13
G2	Rob Cross 95.90	16

Final (best of 31 legs); 19 November
C1	Luke Humphries 104.69 (4)	16
G2	Rob Cross 103.61	8

== Top averages ==
The table lists all players who achieved an average of at least 100 in a match. In the case one player has multiple records, this is indicated by the number in brackets.

#	Player	Round	Average	Result
1	Gerwyn Price	Group Stage	112.30	Won
2	Gerwyn Price (2)	Group Stage	110.51	Won
3	Luke Humphries	Last 16	105.42	Won
4	Gary Anderson	Last 16	104.96	Won
5	Luke Humphries (2)	Final	104.69	Won
6	Rob Cross	Last 16	103.97	Won
7	Rob Cross (2)	Final	103.61	Lost
8	Luke Humphries (3)	Quarter final	103.56	Won
9	Gerwyn Price (3)	Last 16	103.54	Lost
10	Nathan Aspinall	Last 16	103.44	Lost
11	Nathan Rafferty	Group Stage	103.09	Won
12	Gary Anderson (2)	Group Stage	102.77	Won
13	Stowe Buntz	Group Stage	102.28	Won
14	Luke Humphries (4)	Group Stage	101.93	Won
15	Josh Rock	Quarter final	101.31	Lost
16	Michael van Gerwen	Group Stage	101.30	Won
17	Krzysztof Ratajski	Group Stage	101.00	Lost
18	Luke Humphries (5)	Group Stage	100.87	Won
19	Luke Humphries (6)	Group Stage	100.51	Won
