= 2025 Flanders Darts Trophy =

2025 Blåkläder Flanders Darts Trophy

Tournament information
- Dates: 29–31 August 2025
- Venue: Antwerp Expo
- Location: Antwerp, Belgium
- Organisation(s): Professional Darts Corporation (PDC)
- Format: Legs
- Prize fund: £175,000
- Winner's share: £30,000
- High checkout: 170; Ricardo Pietreczko; Mike De Decker

Champion(s)
- Luke Littler (ENG)

The 2025 Flanders Darts Trophy (known for sponsorship reasons as the 2025 Blåkläder Flanders Darts Trophy) was a professional darts tournament that took place at the Antwerp Expo in Antwerp, Belgium, from 29 to 31 August 2025. It was the tenth of fourteen PDC European Tour events on the 2025 PDC Pro Tour. It featured a field of 48 players and £175,000 in prize money, with £30,000 going to the winner.

Dave Chisnall was the defending champion after defeating Ricardo Pietreczko 8–6 in the 2024 final. However, he lost to Leon Weber 6–4 in the second round.

Luke Littler won the tournament, his fourth European Tour title, by defeating Josh Rock 8–7 in the final.

== Prize money ==
The prize fund remained at £175,000, with £30,000 to the winner:

Stage (num. of players)		Prize money
Winner	(1)	£30,000
Runner-up	(1)	£12,000
Semi-finalists	(2)	£8,500
Quarter-finalists	(4)	£6,000
Third round losers	(8)	£4,000
Second round losers	(16)	£2,500*
First round losers	(16)	£1,250*
Total	£175,000	

- Pre-qualified players from the Orders of Merit who lose in their first match of the event shall not be credited with prize money on any Order of Merit. A player who qualifies as a qualifier, but later becomes a seed due to the withdrawal of one or more other players shall be credited with their prize money on all Orders of Merit regardless of how far they progress in the event.

== Qualification and format ==
In a change from the previous year, the top 16 on the two-year main PDC Order of Merit ranking were seeded and entered the tournament in the second round, while the 16 qualifiers from the one-year PDC Pro Tour Order of Merit ranking entered in the first round. In another change, the 16 Pro Tour Order of Merit qualifiers were drawn against one of the 16 other qualifiers in the first round.

The seedings were confirmed on 14 June. The remaining 16 places went to players from four qualifying events – 10 from the Tour Card Holder Qualifier (held on 20 June), four from the Host Nation Qualifier (held on 28 August), one from the Nordic & Baltic Associate Member Qualifier (held on 4 July), and one from the East European Associate Member Qualifier (held on 9 August).

Luke Humphries, Nathan Aspinall and Gary Anderson all withdrew from the event. They were replaced by three players from the reserve list, while Josh Rock, Martin Schindler and Ryan Searle moved up to become the 14th, 15th and 16th seeds respectively. Gerwyn Price then withdrew with a hand injury, and was not replaced in the draw.

The following players took part in the tournament:

Seeded Players

1. Luke Littler (champion)
2. Michael van Gerwen (second round)
3. Stephen Bunting (third round)
4. Jonny Clayton (second round)
5. Chris Dobey (second round)
6. Rob Cross (second round)
7. James Wade (semi-finals)
8. Damon Heta (quarter-finals)
9. ~~Gerwyn Price~~ (withdrew)
10. Dave Chisnall (second round)
11. Peter Wright (second round)
12. Ross Smith (second round)
13. Danny Noppert (quarter-finals)
14. Josh Rock (runner-up)
15. Martin Schindler (third round)
16. Ryan Searle (third round)

Pro Tour Order of Merit Qualifiers
- Cameron Menzies (first round)
- Gian van Veen (quarter-finals)
- Wessel Nijman (first round)
- Mike De Decker (second round)
- Dirk van Duijvenbode (second round)
- Andrew Gilding (first round)
- Daryl Gurney (semi-finals)
- Luke Woodhouse (quarter-finals)
- Raymond van Barneveld (second round)
- Ryan Joyce (third round)
- Joe Cullen (second round)
- Michael Smith (first round)
- Jermaine Wattimena (first round)

Tour Card Qualifier
- Leon Weber (third round)
- Ricardo Pietreczko (first round)
- Steve Lennon (first round)
- Mensur Suljović (third round)
- Martin Lukeman (first round)
- Jeffrey de Graaf (first round)
- Callan Rydz (first round)
- Karel Sedláček (second round)
- Ian White (first round)
- Christian Kist (second round)

Host Nation Qualifier
- Mario Vandenbogaerde (third round)
- Kim Huybrechts (second round)
- Xanti Van den Bergh (first round)
- François Schweyen (first round)

Nordic & Baltic Qualifier
- Johan Engström (first round)

East European Qualifier
- Adam Gawlas (first round)

Reserve List
- Krzysztof Ratajski (third round)
- Dylan Slevin (second round)
- Lukas Wenig (first round)

== Summary ==
=== First round ===
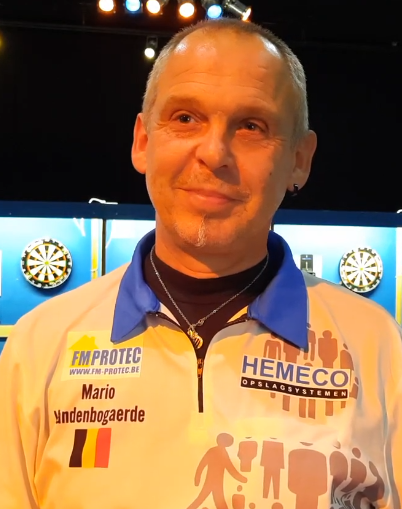
Mario Vandenbogaerde (pictured in 2022) was the only Belgian player to reach the third round.

The first round was played on Friday 29 August. Kim Huybrechts and Mario Vandenbogaerde, who qualified for the event through the Host Nation Qualifier, advanced to the second round after deciding leg victories over Lukas Wenig and former world champion Michael Smith respectively. Antwerp native Huybrechts thanked his hometown crowd and proclaimed, "This is going to be in the top three of my best moments in life." Belgian number one Mike De Decker joined his compatriots in the next round by defeating Martin Lukeman 6–3. Belgian qualifier Xanti Van den Bergh, the younger brother of Dimitri Van den Bergh, made his European Tour debut in a 6–3 loss to five-time world champion Raymond van Barneveld. 2024 runner-up Ricardo Pietreczko converted a 170 checkout but missed three match darts to beat Ryan Joyce, who won 6–5 and received a bye to the third round following Gerwyn Price's withdrawal due to a hand infection. Daryl Gurney and Callan Rydz both achieved three-dart averages of over 100 in their contest, with Gurney prevailing 6–3. Wessel Nijman suffered only his second defeat in the first round of a European Tour event in 2025 as he lost 6–5 to Karel Sedláček. Dylan Slevin beat Belgium's François Schweyen 6–3 to set up a match against reigning world champion Luke Littler, while Leon Weber overcame a ten-point difference in averages to defeat Jermaine Wattimena 6–5. Christian Kist claimed his first European Tour victory since 2017 with a 6–5 win over Cameron Menzies. Reserve player Krzysztof Ratajski avenged his loss in qualifying to Steve Lennon by defeating the Irishman 6–3, while Luke Woodhouse averaged just under 103 in his 6–1 victory against Johan Engström.

=== Second round ===
The second round was played on Saturday 30 August. Luke Littler, who went through dental treatment to get a tooth removed before the tournament, hit six out of six double attempts (100%) to whitewash Dylan Slevin. "When I came up on stage, it just felt like home," said Littler following the victory. Despite taking a 3–1 lead, number two seed Michael van Gerwen was eliminated by Gian van Veen in a 6–3 loss. Mario Vandenbogaerde was the only Belgian player to progress to the third round, defeating Jonny Clayton 6–3 to reach the final day of a European Tour event for the first time. Vandenbogaerde asked "Can you wake me up?" in response to the win before adding, "I'm 52, I go to the oche and I tell myself to enjoy it." Belgium's Mike De Decker and Kim Huybrechts were beaten by Martin Schindler and James Wade respectively, with De Decker hitting a 170 checkout in defeat. Defending champion Dave Chisnall was defeated by Leon Weber 6–4 in his opening match, joining the many seeds to fall in the second round along with Rob Cross, Peter Wright, Chris Dobey and Ross Smith. Ryan Searle overturned a 4–1 deficit to beat Raymond van Barneveld 6–5, while Josh Rock survived match darts against Karel Sedláček to win by the same scoreline. Much like Littler, Danny Noppert converted six out of six double attempts to defeat Dirk van Duijvenbode 6–4. Stephen Bunting averaged over 107 in a 6–1 victory over Joe Cullen and Damon Heta defeated Christian Kist 6–3 to set up a third-round match with Ryan Joyce.

=== Final day ===
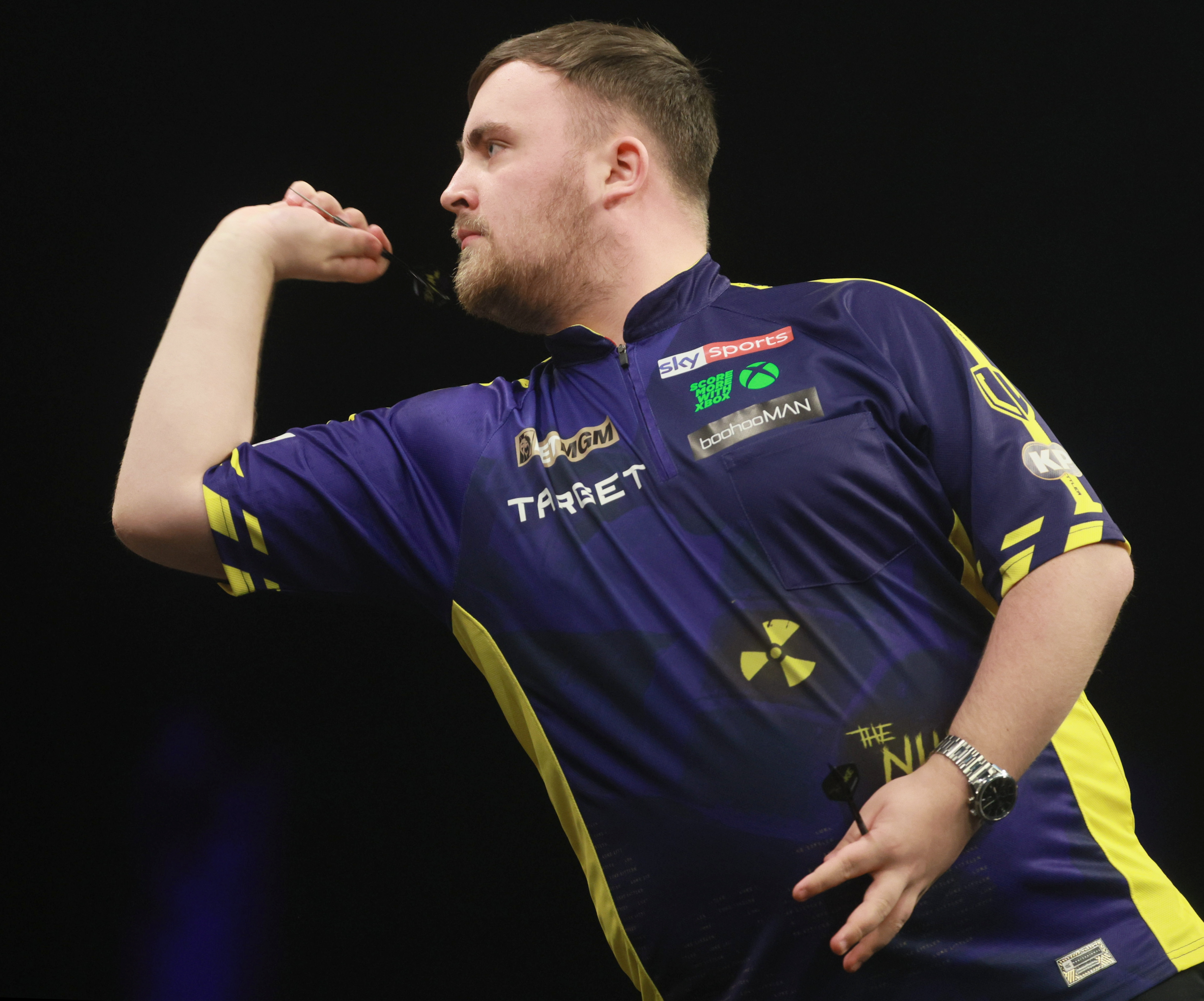
Luke Littler (pictured) won a European Tour title in Belgium for the third time.

The third round, quarter-finals, semi-finals and final were played on Sunday 31 August. The final day saw Luke Littler and Josh Rock reach the final. Littler averaged 110 in his 6–3 win against Ryan Searle in the third round, survived a deciding leg against Damon Heta in the quarter-finals and defeated Daryl Gurney 7–1 to book his place in the final. Rock joined him after beating Stephen Bunting 6–5, Luke Woodhouse 6–4 and James Wade 7–5. Littler was aiming to win his second European Tour title of the year after claiming the Belgian Darts Open trophy in March, while Rock was looking to add to his sole European Tour title at the 2024 Dutch Darts Championship. It was a rematch of their 2025 World Matchplay semi-final, their only previous meeting in the PDC, where Littler defeated Rock 17–14.

Rock started strong by going 4–1 and 5–2 ahead in a race to 8 legs. Reminiscent of their World Matchplay clash, Littler staged a comeback and took the lead for the first time in the 11th leg. Winning five of the next six legs from 5–2 down put Littler on the brink of victory at 7–6, but Rock completed a dramatic 161 checkout on the bullseye to take the match to a deciding leg. Littler would go on to win the last leg in 11 darts, pinning double 18 for a 96 checkout to triumph 8–7. Littler ended the match with a three-dart average of 107.40. Competing in only his third European Tour event in 2025, Littler won his second title in three attempts, with both successes coming in Belgium. It was his fourth European Tour title overall, having also won the Belgian Darts Open and Austrian Darts Open in 2024. In his post-match interview, Littler admitted that "it wasn't a good feeling" when Rock took out the 161 finish but backed himself to win the deciding leg, commenting, "It might sound crazy but I love a last-leg decider!" Despite the narrow defeat, Rock was highly complimentary towards Littler, saying, "He's not officially world number one yet but he will be soon and that's why he is the world champion".

== Draw ==
The draw was announced on 28 August. Numbers to the left of a player's name show the seedings for the top 16 in the tournament. The figures to the right of a player's name state their three-dart average in a match. Players in bold denote match winners.

**First round** (best of 11 legs); 29 August
**Dylan Slevin 86.32**	**6**
François Schweyen 82.96	3
**Raymond van Barneveld 90.45**	**6**
Xanti Van den Bergh 86.33	3
Cameron Menzies 95.55	5
**Christian Kist 97.04**	**6**
**Ryan Joyce 88.36**	**6**
Ricardo Pietreczko 92.18	5
Michael Smith 87.62	5
**Mario Vandenbogaerde 95.72**	**6**
**Dirk van Duijvenbode 96.69**	**6**
Jeffrey de Graaf 96.72	2
**Krzysztof Ratajski 92.07**	**6**
Steve Lennon 89.32	3
**Daryl Gurney 104.29**	**6**
Callan Rydz 106.57	3
**Gian van Veen 90.70**	**6**
Adam Gawlas 84.34	2
**Mike De Decker 82.25**	**6**
Martin Lukeman 84.81	3
Lukas Wenig 90.83	5
**Kim Huybrechts 91.99**	**6**
Jermaine Wattimena 95.69	5
**Leon Weber 85.36**	**6**
**Joe Cullen 87.77**	**6**
Ian White 81.00	1
Wessel Nijman 100.29	5
**Karel Sedláček 98.90**	**6**
Andrew Gilding 86.98	4
**Mensur Suljović 88.03**	**6**
**Luke Woodhouse 102.98**	**6**
Johan Engström 84.09	1

**Second round** (best of 11 legs); 30 August
**1**	**Luke Littler 101.33**	**6**
Dylan Slevin 86.48	0
**16**	**Ryan Searle 100.43**	**6**
Raymond van Barneveld 95.28	5
**8**	**Damon Heta 93.60**	**6**
Christian Kist 83.26	3
9	Gerwyn Price	w/d
**Ryan Joyce**	**w/o**
4	Jonny Clayton 94.73	3
**Mario Vandenbogaerde 91.52**	**6**
**13**	**Danny Noppert 92.48**	**6**
Dirk van Duijvenbode 91.14	4
5	Chris Dobey 96.67	3
**Krzysztof Ratajski 98.33**	**6**
12	Ross Smith 94.05	5
**Daryl Gurney 92.26**	**6**
2	Michael van Gerwen 89.77	3
**Gian van Veen 95.59**	**6**
**15**	**Martin Schindler 88.65**	**6**
Mike De Decker 90.44	3
**7**	**James Wade 84.08**	**6**
Kim Huybrechts 88.60	3
10	Dave Chisnall 94.76	4
**Leon Weber 92.34**	**6**
**3**	**Stephen Bunting 107.47**	**6**
Joe Cullen 94.97	1
**14**	**Josh Rock 96.09**	**6**
Karel Sedláček 87.30	5
6	Rob Cross 92.01	5
**Mensur Suljović 96.12**	**6**
11	Peter Wright 74.62	1
**Luke Woodhouse 94.11**	**6**

**Third round** (best of 11 legs); 31 August
**1**	**Littler 110.33**	**6**
16	Searle 104.22	3
**8**	**Heta 91.18**	**6**
Joyce 89.28	4
Vandenbogaerde 91.72	4
**13**	**Noppert 98.31**	**6**
Ratajski 92.84	5
**Gurney 95.20**	**6**
**van Veen 97.42**	**6**
15	Schindler 94.38	3
**7**	**Wade 90.77**	**6**
Weber 86.11	2
3	Bunting 103.80	5
**14**	**Rock 98.10**	**6**
Suljović 100.57	5
**Woodhouse 100.40**	**6**

**Quarter-finals** (best of 11 legs); 31 August
**1**	**Littler 96.44**	**6**
8	Heta 98.51	5
13	Noppert 82.97	0
**Gurney 99.10**	**6**
van Veen 84.37	4
**7**	**Wade 88.00**	**6**
**14**	**Rock 101.03**	**6**
Woodhouse 100.21	4

**Semi-finals** (best of 13 legs); 31 August
**1**	**Littler 99.46**	**7**
Gurney 94.91	1
7	Wade 98.62	5
**14**	**Rock 102.16**	**7**

**Final** (best of 15 legs); 31 August
**1**	**Littler 107.40**	**8**
14	Rock 100.05	7
