= 2025 European Championship (darts) =

Darts tournament

2025 Machineseeker European Championship

Tournament information
- Dates: 23–26 October 2025
- Venue: Westfalenhallen
- Location: Dortmund, Germany
- Organisation(s): Professional Darts Corporation (PDC)
- Format: Legs
- Prize fund: £600,000
- Winner's share: £120,000
- High checkout: 170 Gian van Veen

Champion(s)
- Gian van Veen (NED)

The 2025 European Championship (known for sponsorship reasons as the 2025 Machineseeker European Championship) was a professional darts tournament that was held at the Westfalenhallen in Dortmund, Germany, from 23 to 26 October 2025. It was the 18th staging of the European Championship by the Professional Darts Corporation (PDC). The total prize fund was £600,000, with the winner receiving £120,000.

The tournament featured the top 32 players based on ranking money earned in the 14 European Tour events that were held as part of the 2025 PDC Pro Tour. Reigning champion Ritchie Edhouse, who defeated Jermaine Wattimena 11–3 in the 2024 final, failed to qualify for the tournament and was unable to defend his title. Niko Springer, Wessel Nijman, Ryan Joyce and Cameron Menzies made their debuts at the event.

Gian van Veen won the tournament, his first PDC major title, with an 11–10 victory in the final against Luke Humphries, who missed a match dart for the title.

== Overview ==
=== Background ===
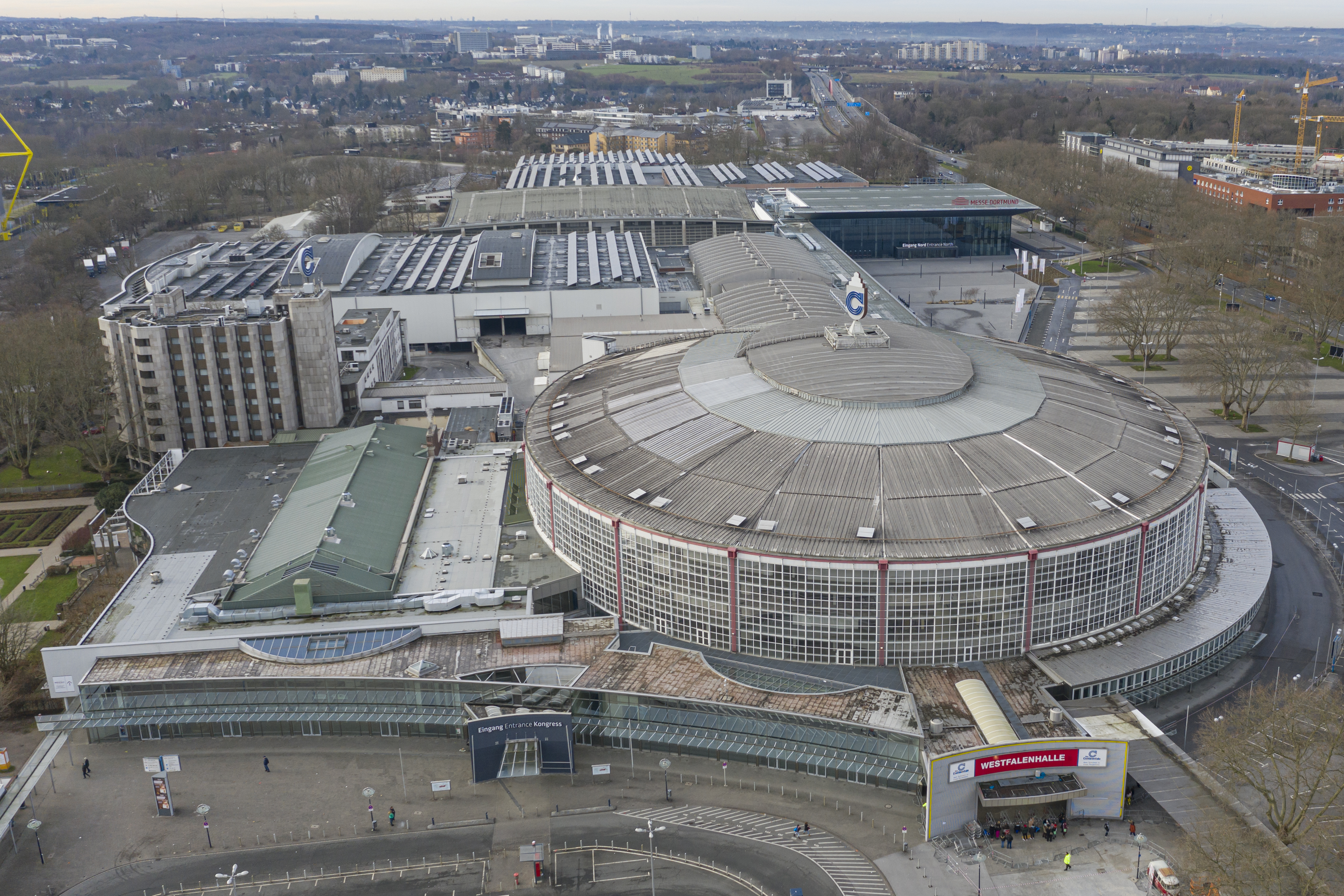
The tournament was held at the Westfalenhallen (pictured c. 2019) in Dortmund, Germany.

The 2025 European Championship was the 18th edition of the tournament to be staged by the Professional Darts Corporation (PDC) since the 2008 event. Most editions of the tournament had been held in Germany, while it had also been hosted in the Netherlands, Belgium and Austria. The inaugural tournament in Frankfurt featured a 32-player field that consisted of the top 16 players on the PDC Order of Merit and various other qualifiers. It was won by Phil Taylor, who defeated Adrian Lewis 11–5 in the final. Taylor won the first four European Championships before his winning streak was ended by Brendan Dolan in the quarter-finals of the 2012 edition, the tournament that saw Simon Whitlock claim his first PDC major title. In 2016, the qualification system for the tournament was changed to be based solely on prize money won in European Tour events during the year.

The 2025 edition is taking place from 23 to 26 October 2025 at the Westfalenhallen in Dortmund, Germany. German machinery company Machineseeker continued its sponsorship of the event, having extended its partnership with the PDC by three years in 2023. Ritchie Edhouse won the 2024 final by defeating Jermaine Wattimena 11–3 to win his first PDC major title. Reigning world champion Luke Littler, world number one Luke Humphries, former world champion Gerwyn Price and 2023 semi-finalist Gian van Veen were seen as the pre-tournament favourites to win the title. Before the tournament, there was discussion about the possibility of Littler taking the world number one spot in the PDC Order of Merit ranking from Humphries. Humphries, who became world number one at the 2024 World Championship, entered the European Championship with a lead of £52,500 at the top of the ranking. A title victory for Littler would have guaranteed him overtaking Humphries, while other scenarios were also possible due to the two being on the same side of the tournament draw.

=== Format ===
The 32-player field was seeded based on the 2025 European Tour Order of Merit, a ranking comprising prize money won in European Tour events during the year. All matches were in leg play format, with the number of legs required to win increasing as the tournament progressed.

- First round: Best of 11 legs
- Second round and quarter-finals: Best of 19 legs
- Semi-finals and final: Best of 21 legs

=== Prize money ===
The prize fund remained at £600,000, with £120,000 going to the winner. The prize fund breakdown was:

Position (num. of players)		Prize money (Total: £600,000)
Winner	(1)	£120,000
Runner-up	(1)	£60,000
Semi-finalists	(2)	£40,000
Quarter-finalists	(4)	£25,000
Second round	(8)	£15,000
First round	(16)	£7,500

=== Broadcasts ===
The tournament was broadcast on ITV4 in the United Kingdom. Other broadcasters included DAZN in Germany, Austria and Switzerland; Viaplay in the Netherlands and Scandinavia; Fox Sports in Australia; Sky Sport in New Zealand; VTM in Belgium; FanDuel TV Extra in the United States; Nova in Czechia and Slovakia; and Zonasport in Croatia. It was also available on the PDC's streaming service, PDCTV, for international subscribers outside of the UK, Germany, Austria and Switzerland.

== Qualification ==
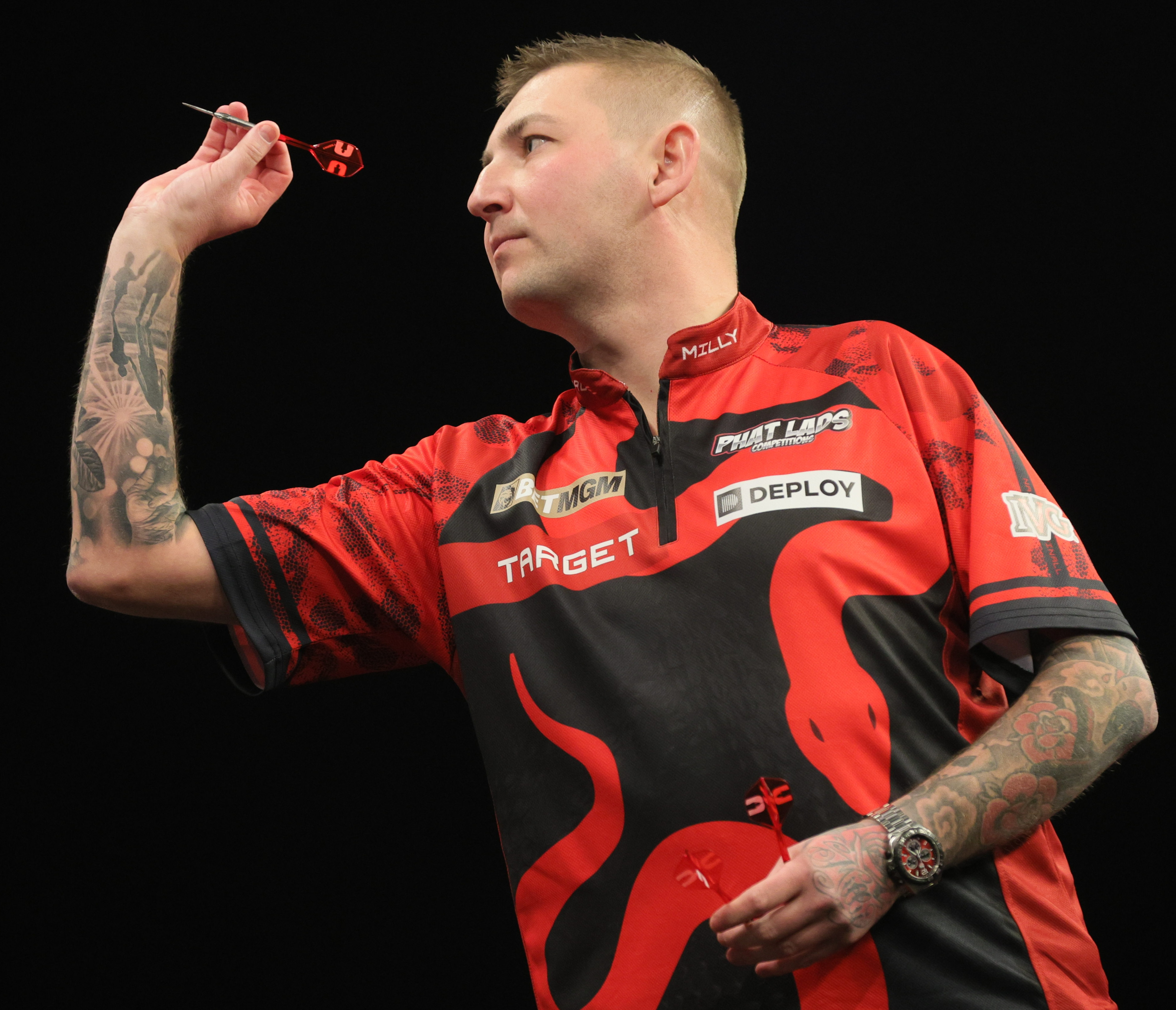
Nathan Aspinall entered the tournament as the number one seed.

The 2025 European Tour was held as part of the 2025 PDC Pro Tour and consisted of 14 events. Following the final event of the season, the German Darts Championship, the top 32 players on the European Tour Order of Merit qualified for the European Championship. Nathan Aspinall entered the tournament as the top seed after winning three titles during the season: the European Darts Trophy, European Darts Open and German Darts Championship.

Reigning champion Ritchie Edhouse suffered a third-round exit at the Swiss Darts Trophy and failed to qualify for the German Darts Championship, resulting in him finishing outside of the top 32 on the European Tour Order of Merit and being unable to defend his title, marking the first edition of the tournament to not feature a defending champion. Other notable absentees from the tournament included Joe Cullen, who missed out on qualification for the first time in a decade, as well as 2023 world champion Michael Smith and former UK Open champions, Dimitri Van den Bergh and Andrew Gilding; Gilding was overtaken by Dave Chisnall during the German Darts Championship. Niko Springer, Wessel Nijman, Ryan Joyce and Cameron Menzies made their debuts in the event.

The following players qualified for the tournament:

1. Nathan Aspinall (ENG) (second round)
2. Martin Schindler (GER) (second round)
3. Stephen Bunting (ENG) (first round)
4. Luke Littler (ENG) (second round)
5. Luke Humphries (ENG) (runner-up)
6. Gerwyn Price (WAL) (first round)
7. Jonny Clayton (WAL) (first round)
8. Josh Rock (NIR) (first round)
9. Niko Springer (GER) (first round)
10. Gian van Veen (NED) (champion)
11. Ross Smith (ENG) (second round)
12. Gary Anderson (SCO) (first round)
13. James Wade (ENG) (quarter-finals)
14. Wessel Nijman (NED) (first round)
15. Ryan Joyce (ENG) (quarter-finals)
16. Dirk van Duijvenbode (NED) (first round)
17. Danny Noppert (NED) (semi-finals)
18. Luke Woodhouse (ENG) (first round)
19. Michael van Gerwen (NED) (semi-finals)
20. Mike De Decker (BEL) (first round)
21. Cameron Menzies (SCO) (second round)
22. Peter Wright (SCO) (first round)
23. Damon Heta (AUS) (first round)
24. Jermaine Wattimena (NED) (second round)
25. Ricardo Pietreczko (GER) (quarter-finals)
26. Ryan Searle (ENG) (second round)
27. Daryl Gurney (NIR) (quarter-finals)
28. Krzysztof Ratajski (POL) (first round)
29. Raymond van Barneveld (NED) (first round)
30. Chris Dobey (ENG) (second round)
31. Dave Chisnall (ENG) (first round)
32. Rob Cross (ENG) (first round)

== Summary ==
=== First round ===
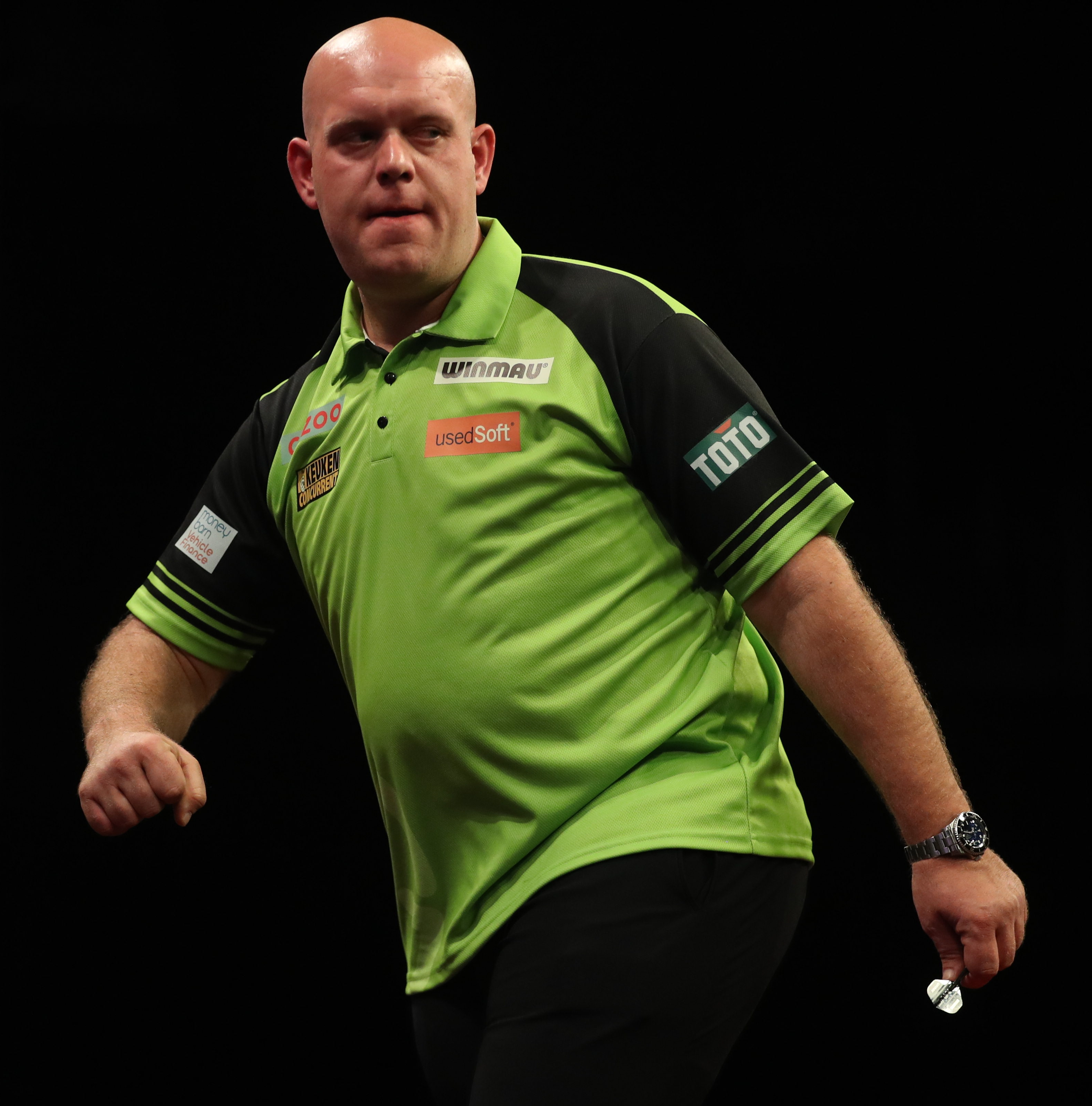
Michael van Gerwen (pictured in 2022) survived seven missed match darts from Wessel Nijman and won 6–5 in the first round.

The first round was played on 23 and 24 October. Four-time European Championship winner Michael van Gerwen found himself 4–2 down to compatriot Wessel Nijman but was able to take the lead at 5–4, only for Nijman to level the contest at 5–5. In the deciding leg, Nijman missed a total of seven match darts as Van Gerwen converted a 70 checkout to win. "I should have beaten him 6–4 and when you put yourself in that position it's going to be tough," said Van Gerwen, who extended his undefeated streak against Nijman to five matches. Stephen Bunting posted a three-dart average of 109.20 but was defeated 6–3 by Chris Dobey, breaking the record for the highest losing average in tournament history. Dobey stated that it was "nice to be on the winning side of a game like that for once" and previewed his second-round tie against Van Gerwen, explaining: "I'd rather play Michael [van Gerwen] at his best because I know I've got to play well again like I did tonight, and I'll be ready for him on Saturday." Second seed Martin Schindler went 3–0 down against Dave Chisnall but levelled the match at 3–3, eventually beating Chisnall in a deciding leg to progress to the second round of the tournament for the first time. Both Welsh players were eliminated in the first round, with Daryl Gurney avenging his loss to Gerwyn Price at the World Matchplay by winning 6–3 and Jonny Clayton losing to Ryan Searle by the same scoreline. 2022 champion Ross Smith hit a 128 checkout to defeat two-time champion Peter Wright 6–2, a result that saw Wright fall to world number 30 on the PDC Order of Merit—his lowest position since 2011—due to his 2023 European Championship winnings dropping off his ranking. Damon Heta suffered a fourth consecutive first-round defeat at the tournament as he lost 6–3 to Gian van Veen, while Ryan Joyce advanced with a 6–3 victory over Luke Woodhouse.

Reigning world champion Luke Littler and world number one Luke Humphries were both successful in their opening games: Littler claimed a 6–1 win over five-time world champion Raymond van Barneveld, while Humphries hit a 161 checkout to earn a whitewash victory against Krzysztof Ratajski with a three-dart average of 109.98. Number one seed Nathan Aspinall defeated two-time European Championship winner Rob Cross 6–1. Aspinall admitted that facing Cross in the first round as number one seed was "not ideal" but believed he handled it well, adding: "I've suffered a lot over the last three or four years, but when I've got a clear mind I'm a very tough opponent, and I think my darts are showing that." 2018 champion James Wade set up a second-round match with Littler by beating Mike De Decker 6–1, while Cameron Menzies progressed to a tie with Humphries after defeating compatriot Gary Anderson 6–3. Germany's Ricardo Pietreczko joined Schindler in the second round by winning 6–4 against Josh Rock, marking the first time two German players reached the second round of the tournament. Jermaine Wattimena averaged 106.87 on his way to defeating debutant Niko Springer 6–3, while Danny Noppert beat Dirk van Duijvenbode by the same scoreline in an all-Dutch clash.

=== Second round ===
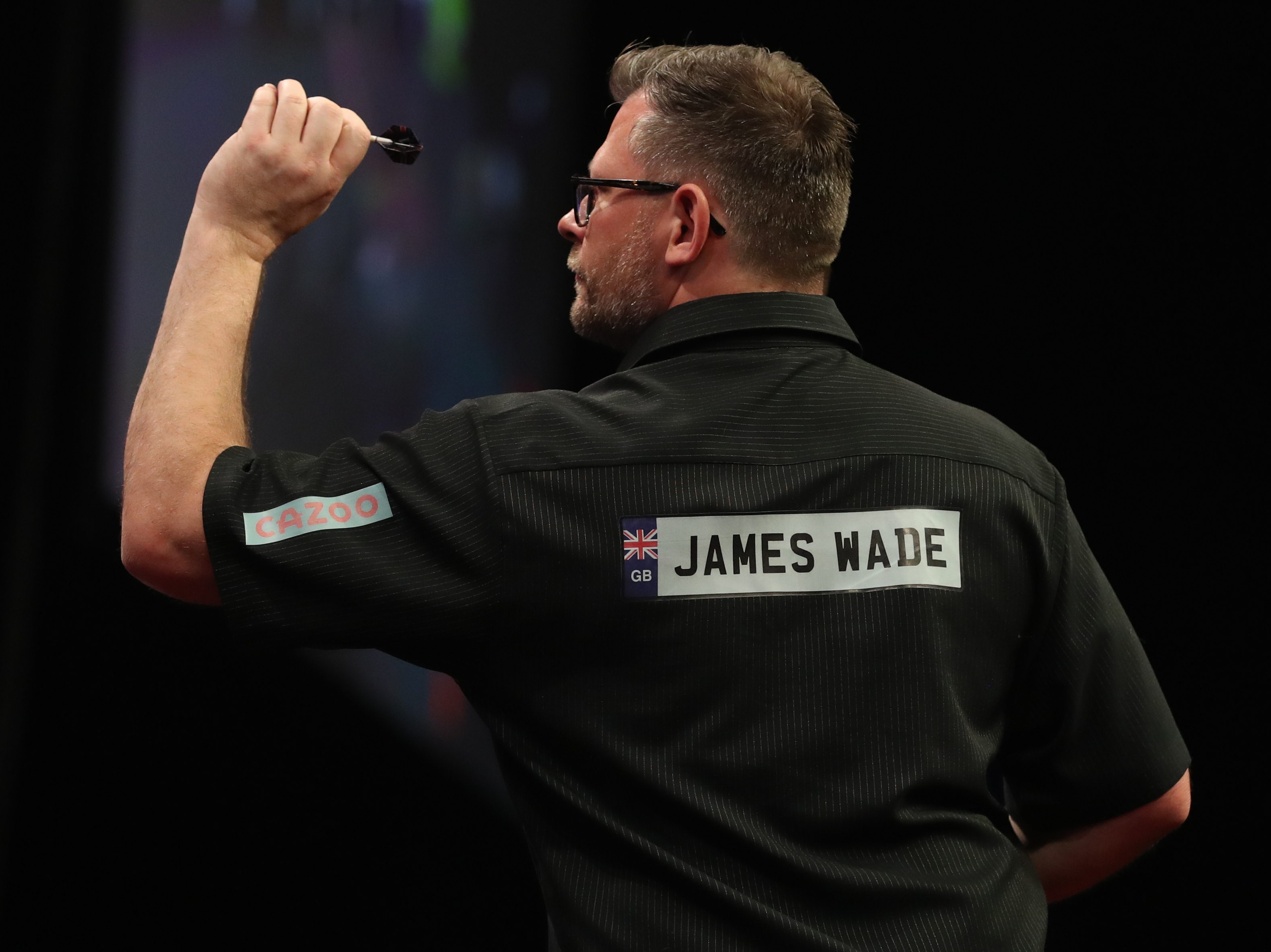
James Wade (pictured in 2022) eliminated reigning world champion Luke Littler in the second round.

The second round was played on 25 October. Luke Littler's chances of becoming world number one at the tournament were ended as he was eliminated in a 10–7 loss to James Wade, who won three consecutive legs from 7–7 to secure victory. Both players achieved the same three-dart average—97.75—but Wade's checkout success rate helped him earn his first televised win over Littler. It was the first time Littler had not reached the quarter-finals of a ranking major event since the previous year's edition. Wade believed that Littler "didn’t play his A-game" but was still happy, saying that he "probably should have run away with the game earlier than [he] did, but it's a big positive to move forwards." Luke Humphries avoided a second-round exit as he came through a deciding leg against Cameron Menzies after recovering from an 8–5 deficit. "When you're winning in games where you're under the cosh, it's quite pleasing," Humphries remarked after the match. Danny Noppert reached a fifth consecutive European Championship quarter-final by defeating Nathan Aspinall 10–7 with a 130 checkout on the bullseye, while Ricardo Pietreczko advanced as the only remaining German player by beating Jermaine Wattimena 10–6. Michael van Gerwen continued his hunt for a fifth European Championship title with a 10–5 victory over Chris Dobey, being joined by compatriot Gian van Veen who earned a 10–2 win against Ryan Searle, hitting seven maximums and a 170 checkout in the process. Ryan Joyce produced a 67% checkout success rate as he beat Martin Schindler 10–7, while Daryl Gurney converted checkouts of 116, 122 and 124 in his 10–6 win over Ross Smith.

=== Quarter-finals and semi-finals ===
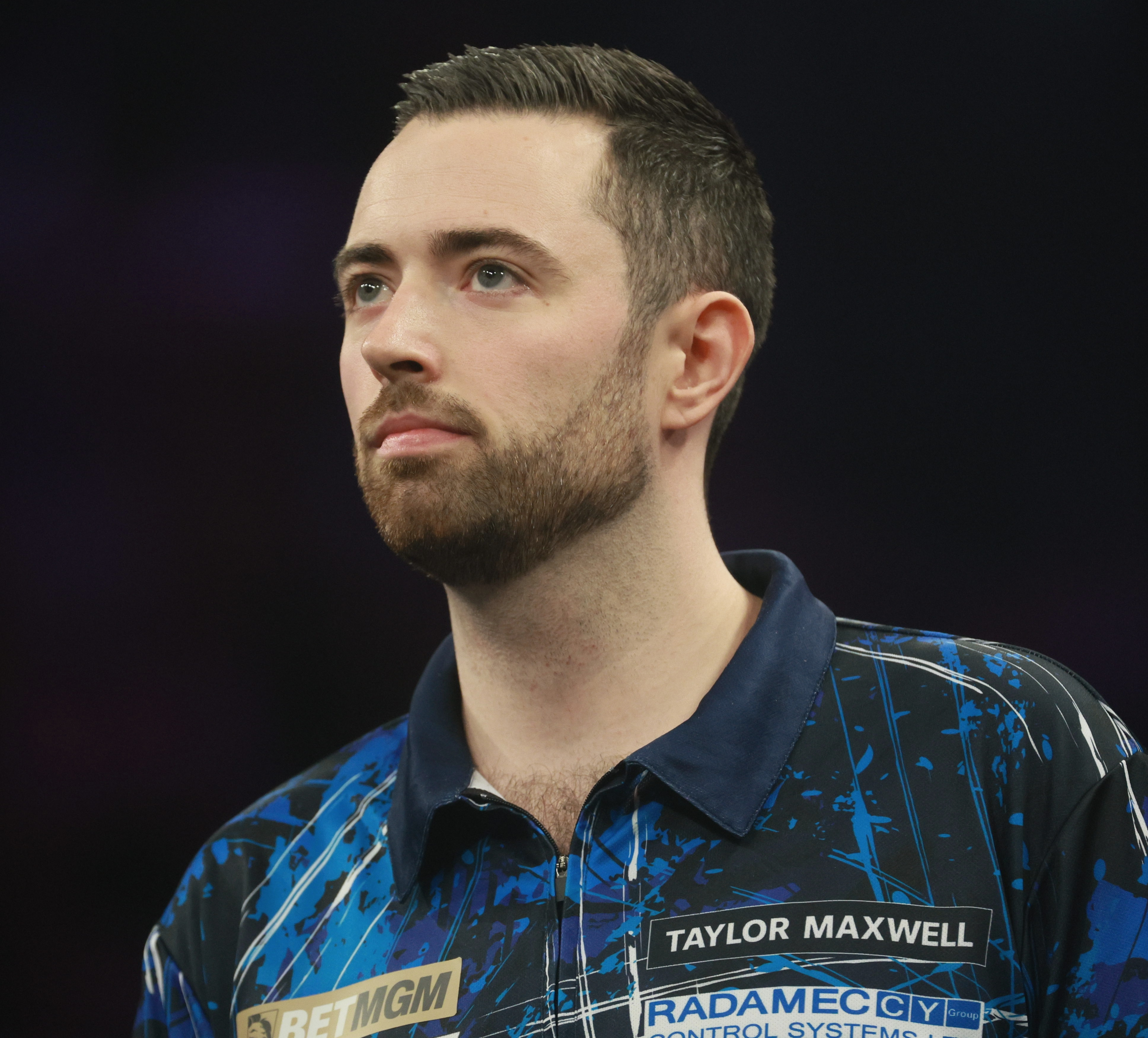
Luke Humphries (pictured) won eight consecutive legs to defeat James Wade 10–3 in the quarter-finals; he would then reach the final, where he lost in a deciding leg.

The quarter-finals were played in the afternoon session of 26 October, with the semi-finals taking place before the final in the evening session. Gian van Veen reached his second European Championship semi-final in three appearances with a 10–5 win over Ryan Joyce. Michael van Gerwen progressed to his second major semi-final of 2025 by defeating Daryl Gurney 10–7, setting up a match against compatriot Van Veen in the penultimate round. In a rematch of their quarter-final meeting the previous year, Danny Noppert secured a second successive European Championship semi-final by beating Ricardo Pietreczko 10–5 and was joined by Luke Humphries, who won eight consecutive legs to complete a 10–3 victory against James Wade, reaching the last four of the tournament for the first time.

In the first semi-final, Humphries established a 5–0 lead over Noppert in the opening session, but Noppert fought back and overturned the deficit to lead 8–6. From there, Humphries won the next five legs for an 11–8 victory and a place in the final. In the other semi-final, Van Veen, who cut his thumb and index finger during his match against Joyce, found himself 6–3 down against Van Gerwen. He restored parity at 7–7 and 9–9 before costly missed doubles from Van Gerwen allowed Van Veen to take control, eventually securing an 11–9 win to set up a clash with Humphries in the final.

=== Final ===
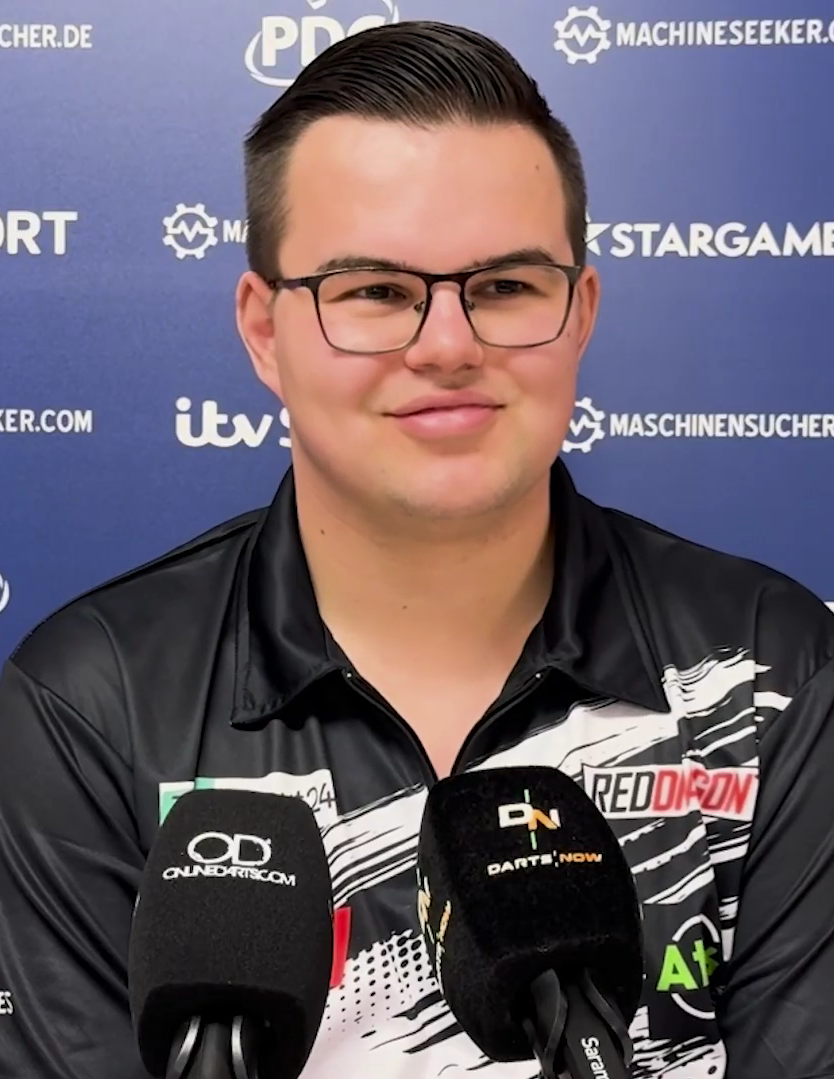
Gian van Veen (pictured) won his first PDC major title by defeating Luke Humphries 11–10 in the final.

The final between fifth seed Luke Humphries and tenth seed Gian van Veen was played in the evening session of 26 October. Both players were competing in their first European Championship final; Humphries's win against James Wade in the quarter-finals marked his first time going past that stage, while Van Veen, the reigning World Youth champion, had previously reached the semi-finals in 2023. It was Humphries's fourth major final of 2025, having won the World Masters and Premier League and finished as runner-up at the World Grand Prix. It was the first PDC major final in the career of Van Veen, who won his first PDC ranking title at Players Championship 6 earlier in the year, defeating Humphries in the final.

Humphries began the final with another commanding opening session as he went 4–1 up. Van Veen found form once the match resumed, winning four of the next five legs, a run that included a 10-dart leg and a 160 checkout to level the score at 4–4. The Dutchman took the lead for the first time when he went 7–6 ahead and increased his advantage to 9–7, having converted finishes of 91, 112 and 121. Humphries claimed back-to-back legs to tie the match at 9–9. Leading 10–9 with one more leg required for victory, Van Veen missed two match darts at double 20 for a 100 checkout. Humphries seized the opportunity and hit an 85 checkout on the bullseye to take the final to a deciding leg. Humphries attempted a 69 finish to capture the title but also missed a match dart at double 20, allowing Van Veen to convert a 100 checkout—single 20, treble 16, double 16—for the 11–10 win. Van Veen and Humphries ended the match with three-dart averages of 101 and 95.24 respectively.

Van Veen won the European Championship for the first time, marking his maiden PDC major title. He became the youngest winner of the tournament, aged 23, and was the first player outside of Humphries and Luke Littler to win a major ranking title in 2025. The £120,000 top prize saw him rise to a career-high ranking of world number seven on the PDC Order of Merit. "I said it to my girlfriend when I walked on stage, whenever I win my first TV title I wouldn't cry – and here I am crying," Van Veen jokingly recounted in his post-match interview. He admitted that he "thought it was over" when Humphries took out 85 to send the match to a decider, later calling his opponent "an amazing person" as a show of respect for his sportsmanship in defeat. Humphries, who earned £60,000 for his runner-up finish, dubbed Van Veen "an unbelievable player" and expressed his belief in him being "Premier League material".

== Draw ==
The draw was confirmed on 19 October following the culmination of the German Darts Championship. Numbers to the left of a player's name show the 32 seedings for the tournament. The figures to the right of a player's name state their three-dart average in a match. Players in bold denote match winners.

**First round** (best of 11 legs); 23–24 October
**1**	**Nathan Aspinall 100.53**	**6**
32	Rob Cross 93.25	1
16	Dirk van Duijvenbode 97.30	3
**17**	**Danny Noppert 104.88**	**6**
8	Josh Rock 91.90	4
**25**	**Ricardo Pietreczko 94.60**	**6**
9	Niko Springer 94.91	3
**24**	**Jermaine Wattimena 106.87**	**6**
**4**	**Luke Littler 98.97**	**6**
29	Raymond van Barneveld 87.86	1
**13**	**James Wade 97.67**	**6**
20	Mike De Decker 85.57	1
**5**	**Luke Humphries 109.98**	**6**
28	Krzysztof Ratajski 92.28	0
12	Gary Anderson 94.63	3
**21**	**Cameron Menzies 96.83**	**6**
**2**	**Martin Schindler 104.05**	**6**
31	Dave Chisnall 92.45	5
**15**	**Ryan Joyce 96.93**	**6**
18	Luke Woodhouse 90.47	3
7	Jonny Clayton 91.90	3
**26**	**Ryan Searle 92.56**	**6**
**10**	**Gian van Veen 98.73**	**6**
23	Damon Heta 93.97	3
3	Stephen Bunting 109.20	3
**30**	**Chris Dobey 105.76**	**6**
14	Wessel Nijman 96.57	5
**19**	**Michael van Gerwen 97.83**	**6**
6	Gerwyn Price 91.49	3
**27**	**Daryl Gurney 90.51**	**6**
**11**	**Ross Smith 94.95**	**6**
22	Peter Wright 93.61	2

**Second round** (best of 19 legs); 25 October
1	Nathan Aspinall 99.50	7
**17**	**Danny Noppert 101.12**	**10**
**25**	**Ricardo Pietreczko 95.44**	**10**
24	Jermaine Wattimena 92.47	6
4	Luke Littler 97.75	7
**13**	**James Wade 97.75**	**10**
**5**	**Luke Humphries 104.03**	**10**
21	Cameron Menzies 101.53	9
2	Martin Schindler 93.71	7
**15**	**Ryan Joyce 92.42**	**10**
26	Ryan Searle 87.42	2
**10**	**Gian van Veen 109.92**	**10**
30	Chris Dobey 101.21	5
**19**	**Michael van Gerwen 100.76**	**10**
**27**	**Daryl Gurney 92.54**	**10**
11	Ross Smith 91.06	6

**Quarter-finals** (best of 19 legs); 26 October
**17**	**Danny Noppert 95.22**	**10**
25	Ricardo Pietreczko 90.29	5
13	James Wade 92.61	3
**5**	**Luke Humphries 100.82**	**10**
15	Ryan Joyce 90.76	5
**10**	**Gian van Veen 101.40**	**10**
**19**	**Michael van Gerwen 99.57**	**10**
27	Daryl Gurney 96.61	7

**Semi-finals** (best of 21 legs); 26 October
17	Danny Noppert 96.85	8
**5**	**Luke Humphries 99.34**	**11**
**10**	**Gian van Veen 93.76**	**11**
19	Michael van Gerwen 93.57	9

**Final** (best of 21 legs); 26 October
5	Luke Humphries 95.24	10
**10**	**Gian van Veen 101.00**	**11**
