= Ricardo Pietreczko =

German darts player (born 1994)

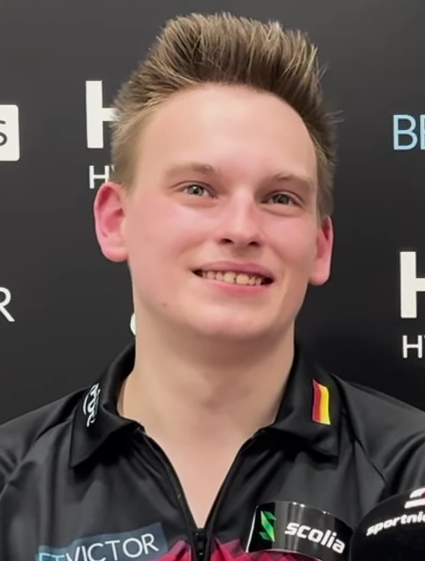
- Pietreczko in 2025

Personal information
- Nickname: "Pikachu"
- Born: 20 October 1994 (age 32) Berlin, Germany
- Home town: Laatzen, Germany

Sport
- Sport: Darts
- Playing since: 2010
- Darts: Precise 180
- Laterality: Right-handed
- Walk-on music: "Pokémon Theme" by Jason Paige

Organisation (see split in darts)
- BDO: 2017–2020
- PDC: 2014–present (Tour Card: 2022–present)
- WDF: 2017–2020
- Current world ranking: (PDC) 36 (5 November 2026)

WDF major events – best performances
- World Masters: Last 32: 2018

PDC premier events – best performances
- World Championship: Last 16: 2025
- World Matchplay: Last 32: 2024, 2025
- World Grand Prix: Last 16: 2024
- UK Open: Last 64: 2024, 2025
- Grand Slam: Group Stage: 2023
- European Championship: Quarter-final: 2024, 2025
- PC Finals: Last 16: 2025

Other tournament wins
- Years
European Tour events
German Darts Championship	2023
Medal record
Men's Darts
Representing Germany
WDF World Cup
Bronze medal – third place	2017 Kobe	Men's singles

Ricardo Pietreczko (born 20 October 1994) is a German professional darts player who competes in Professional Darts Corporation (PDC) events. Nicknamed "Pikachu" after the character from Pokémon, he won his maiden PDC title at the 2023 German Darts Championship. He is a two-time European Championship quarter-finalist, with back-to-back quarter-final appearances in 2024 and 2025. He reached the last 16 of the 2025 PDC World Darts Championship and was a semi-finalist at the 2025 World Cup of Darts, representing Germany alongside Martin Schindler in the latter.

== Career ==
Pietreczko started playing darts at the age of 16 after his father put a dartboard in his room and he trained diligently before and after school. In 2014, he took part in qualifiers for PDC European Tour events, but was not able to qualify. At the national level, however, he was doing much better. He advanced to the semi-finals of the Super League Darts. In 2016, he took part in the 4 Nations Cup for the Germany team and reached the semi-finals in singles competition, where he lost to Wesley Harms 5–3 in legs.

At the beginning of 2017, he played at the Dinslaken Open and reached the final, where he lost to Daniel Zygla. As the third in the national ranking of qualifying tour for the WDF World Cup, he qualified to participate in the 2017 WDF World Cup as a representative of Germany. In the singles competition, he won the bronze medal, lost in the semi-final to Raymond Smith by 1–6 in legs. Pietreczko also made his debut at the 2017 World Masters, where he advanced to the fourth round. In his fourth round match, he lost to Neil Duff 3–0 in sets.

At the end of February 2018, Pietreczko won the Donnersberg Cup in Rockenhausen, and in mid-June he won the German Championship for the first time. At the beginning of September, Pietreczko qualified for a PDC European Tour event, the 2018 International Darts Open, but lost in the first round to Ryan Searle 6–4 in legs. The next day, Pietreczko won the DDV ranking tournament in Steinfurt. Pietreczko was appointed by the national federation to represent Germany at the 2018 WDF Europe Cup. In the singles competition, he advanced to the third round where he lost to Ross Montgomery. In pairs and team competition, he was eliminated in the earlier stage.

He played at the 2018 World Masters, where he advanced to the fifth round, where he lost to seeded Willem Mandigers 3–1 in sets. In mid-November, Pietreczko made a successful return to the Super League Darts, when he won the qualifier in Düsseldorf. In May 2019, he qualified for the 2019 European Darts Grand Prix, where he lost in first round match to Jamie Hughes by 1–6 in legs. In October 2020, Pietreczko achieved his first victory on the Professional Darts Corporation stage, during the 2020 European Darts Grand Prix. In the first round match, he beat Luke Woodhouse by 6–1 in legs, but in the second round match he lost to José de Sousa. In 2021, he participated in the PDC Challenge Tour events.

=== 2022 ===
In January 2022, Pietreczko earned a PDC Tour Card at PDC Q-School by finishing ninth on the European Q-School Order of Merit. In October, he reached his first semi-final on the PDC Pro Tour at Players Championship 28, a run that included wins over Ryan Meikle, Gabriel Clemens and Ross Smith. He was defeated by Luke Humphries 7–2. Pietreczko made his televised PDC debut at the 2022 Players Championship Finals and caused a major upset by beating number one seed Damon Heta 6–5 in the first round.

=== 2023 ===
In March 2023, Pietreczko reached his second Pro Tour semi-final at Players Championship 8; he defeated Jonny Clayton, Keegan Brown and Ross Smith before losing 7–2 to Krzysztof Ratajski. At the European Darts Open, he reached the quarter-finals, narrowly losing 6–5 to Rob Cross.

In October, Pietreczko won his first PDC title at the 2023 German Darts Championship – the final event on the 2023 European Tour. Having previously beaten George Killington and Stephen Bunting before a 7–6 win over world number two Michael van Gerwen in the semi-finals, he claimed the title by defeating two-time world champion Peter Wright 8–4 in the final without missing a dart at double. The victory saw him become the second German player to win a PDC ranking title after Max Hopp, while also securing him qualification for the European Championship.

In his European Championship debut, he won his first-round match 6–3 against defending champion Ross Smith. He was eliminated in the second round, losing 10–7 to Michael van Gerwen.

=== 2024 ===
Pietreczko reached the third round of the 2024 PDC World Championship in his PDC World Championship debut campaign. Despite a 3–1 lead over world number three Luke Humphries, he was eliminated from the tournament as Humphries came back to win 4–3.

In the first event of the 2024 European Tour, the Belgian Darts Open, he reached the semi-finals where he met 2024 World Championship runner-up Luke Littler. Pietreczko was defeated 7–3 but the tie was more remembered for its post-match incident, where Pietreczko confronted Littler unhappily. He later posted on Instagram that he hoped "his [Littler's] arrogance punishes him." In September, Pietreczko reached his second European Tour final at the Flanders Darts Trophy after beating Luke Humphries 7–4 to become the first German player to reach two European Tour finals. He was beaten in the final 8–6 by Dave Chisnall.

Pietreczko made his World Matchplay and World Grand Prix debuts in 2024. He was defeated 10–4 in the first round of the World Matchplay by Luke Humphries, who also eliminated him from the World Grand Prix in the second round.

Pietreczko reached the quarter-finals of the European Championship after victories over Damon Heta and Andrew Gilding. He was denied a place in the semi-finals by Danny Noppert, who came back from 9–7 down to defeat Pietreczko 10–9 in a deciding leg.

=== 2025 ===
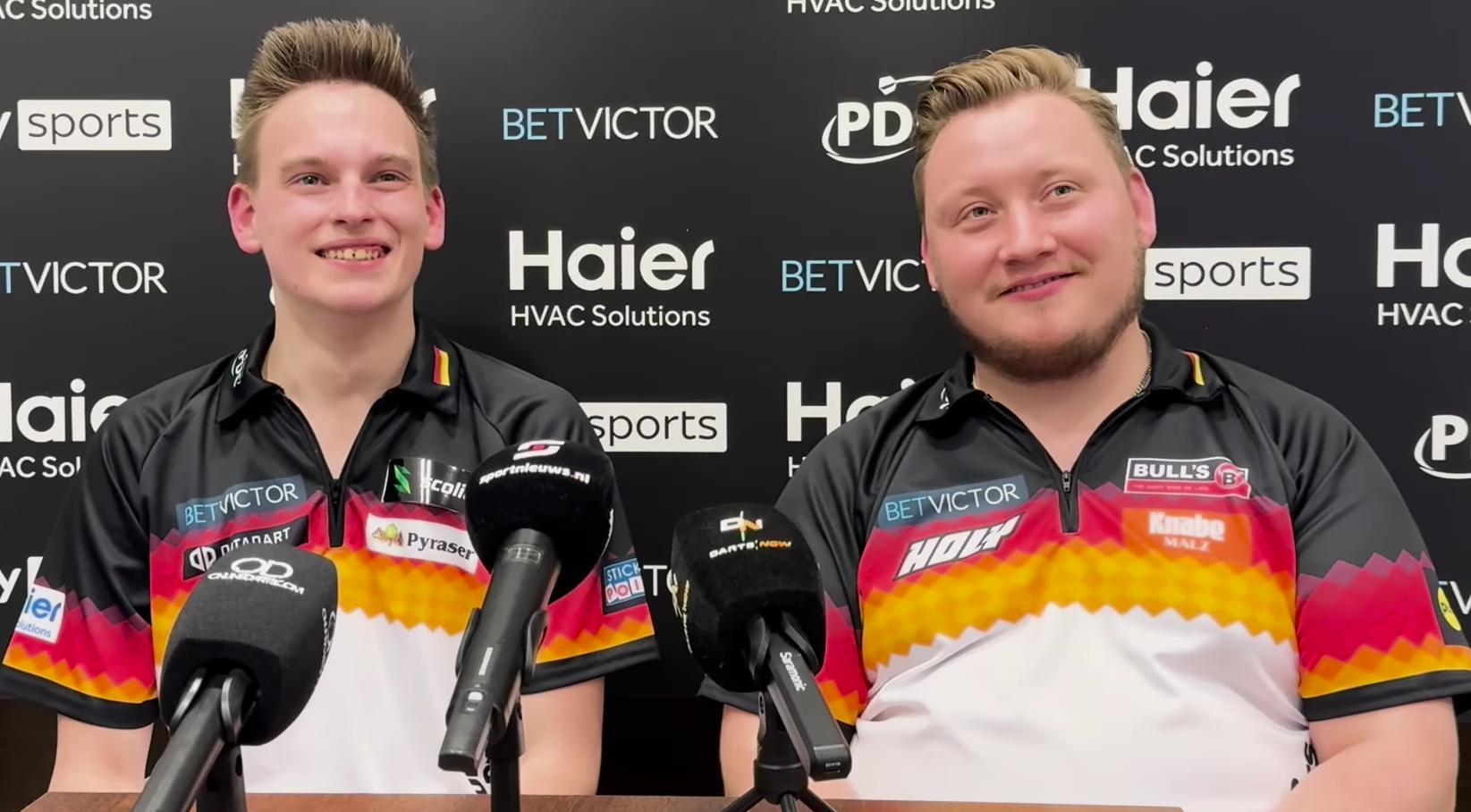
Pietreczko (left) and his German teammate Martin Schindler at the 2025 PDC World Cup of Darts

After defeating Xiaochen Zong 3–0 in the first round of the 2025 World Championship, Pietreczko beat 28th seed Gian van Veen 3–1 to progress to the third round. He then secured a 4–1 victory over 2024 semi-finalist Scott Williams. In the fourth round, he only managed a three-dart average of 78.46 in a 4–0 defeat to Nathan Aspinall.

Pietreczko represented Germany at the PDC World Cup of Darts for the first time, partnering Martin Schindler. The German duo produced a shock 8–4 win against defending champions and tournament favourites England in the second round. They reached the semi-finals of the tournament but were eliminated by eventual champions Northern Ireland. In October, Pietreczko reached his second straight European Championship quarter-final, where he lost 10–5 to Danny Noppert in a rematch of their meeting the previous year.

=== 2026 ===
Pietreczko opened his 2026 World Championship campaign with a 3–1 victory against José de Sousa. He overcame a late surge from Dave Chisnall in the second round, winning 3–2 to progress to the third round for the third year in a row, where he lost 4–2 to Swedish qualifier Andreas Harrysson.

During the year, Pietreczko struggled with issues related to his throw, linked with dartitis, which resulted in a downturn in form, lower three-dart averages, and him withdrawing from a match with Jeffrey de Zwaan at Players Championship 14 after playing two legs. Despite this, he showed signs of improvement at the International Darts Open, including a win against Danny Noppert, and ultimately decided to compete at the World Cup of Darts alongside Martin Schindler. The German duo reached the quarter-finals, where they were beaten 8–4 by the Netherlands.

== World Championship results ==
=== PDC ===
- 2024: Third round (lost to Luke Humphries 3–4)
- 2025: Fourth round (lost to Nathan Aspinall 0–4)
- 2026: Third round (lost to Andreas Harrysson 2–4)

== Performance timeline ==
=== BDO ===
Tournament	2017	2018
BDO Ranked televised events
World Masters	4R	5R

=== PDC ===
Tournament	2022	2023	2024	2025	2026
PDC Ranked televised events
World Championship	DNQ		3R	4R	3R
World Masters	Did not qualify			Prel.	Prel.
UK Open	2R	2R	4R	4R	3R
World Matchplay	DNQ		1R	1R	DNQ
World Grand Prix	DNQ		2R	DNQ	
European Championship	DNQ	2R	QF	QF	DNQ
Grand Slam	DNQ	RR	DNQ		
Players Championship Finals	2R	2R	DNQ	3R	DNQ
PDC Non-ranked televised events
World Cup	Did not qualify			SF	QF
Career statistics
Season-end ranking	99	36	30	34	

==== European Tour ====
Season	1	2	3	4	5	6	7	8	9	10	11	12	13	14	15
2018	Did not participate											IDO; 1R	EDT; DNP		
2019	Did not participate					EDG; 1R	Did not qualify			Did not participate					
2020	BDC; DNP	GDC; DNQ	EDG; 2R	IDO; DNP											
2023	BSD; DNQ	EDO; QF	DNQ		ADO; 2R	DDC; 1R	DNQ		EDG; 1R	EDM; 2R	GDO; 2R	HDT; 1R	GDC; W		
2024	BDO; SF	GDG; 2R	IDO; 3R	EDG; 2R	ADO; 2R	BSD; 3R	DDC; 2R	EDO; 2R	GDC; 3R	FDT; F	HDT; 3R	SDT; 2R	CDO; 3R		
2025	BDO; 2R	EDT; 2R	IDO; 2R	GDG; 2R	ADO; 2R	EDG; DNQ	DDC; QF	EDO; 3R	BSD; 2R	FDT; 1R	CDO; 1R	HDT; 2R	SDT; 2R	GDC; 2R	
2026	Did not qualify			GDG; 2R	EDG; DNQ	ADO; 1R	IDO; 3R	Did not qualify							DDC; 1R

==== Players Championships ====
Season	1	2	3	4	5	6	7	8	9	10	11	12	13	14	15	16	17	18	19	20	21	22	23	24	25	26	27	28	29	30	31	32	33	34
2022	BAR; 2R	BAR; 1R	WIG; 2R	WIG; 1R	BAR; 1R	BAR; 1R	NIE; 1R	NIE; 2R	BAR; 1R	BAR; 1R	BAR; 1R	BAR; 1R	BAR; 1R	WIG; 2R	WIG; 2R	NIE; 2R	NIE; 1R	BAR; 2R	BAR; 2R	BAR; 3R	BAR; 1R	BAR; 4R	BAR; 4R	BAR; 1R	BAR; 2R	BAR; 3R	BAR; 2R	BAR; SF	BAR; 1R	BAR; 1R				
2023	BAR; 1R	BAR; 2R	BAR; 4R	BAR; 1R	BAR; 1R	BAR; 3R	HIL; 1R	HIL; SF	WIG; 3R	WIG; 2R	LEI; 2R	LEI; 1R	HIL; 4R	HIL; 2R	LEI; 1R	LEI; 3R	HIL; 4R	HIL; 2R	BAR; 2R	BAR; 2R	BAR; 3R	BAR; 4R	BAR; QF	BAR; 2R	BAR; 1R	BAR; 1R	BAR; SF	BAR; QF	BAR; 4R	BAR; 2R				
2024	WIG; 4R	WIG; 2R	LEI; 2R	LEI; 3R	HIL; 3R	HIL; 2R	LEI; 2R	LEI; 1R	HIL; 1R	HIL; 2R	HIL; 2R	HIL; 1R	MIL; 1R	MIL; 1R	MIL; 1R	MIL; 1R	MIL; 2R	MIL; 1R	MIL; 1R	WIG; 1R	WIG; 1R	MIL; 1R	MIL; 1R	WIG; 3R	WIG; 2R	WIG; 2R	WIG; 1R	WIG; 1R	LEI; 4R	LEI; 1R				
2025	WIG; 1R	WIG; 2R	ROS; 4R	ROS; 2R	LEI; 1R	LEI; 1R	HIL; 2R	HIL; 1R	LEI; 1R	LEI; 4R	LEI; 1R	LEI; 3R	ROS; 4R	ROS; QF	HIL; 3R	HIL; 3R	LEI; 2R	LEI; 3R	LEI; 2R	LEI; 3R	LEI; 1R	HIL; 1R	HIL; 1R	MIL; 1R	MIL; 1R	HIL; 2R	HIL; 2R	LEI; 2R	LEI; 2R	LEI; 2R	WIG; 1R	WIG; 1R	WIG; 1R	WIG; 2R
2026	HIL; 3R	HIL; 1R	WIG; 3R	WIG; 1R	LEI; 4R	LEI; 1R	LEI; 1R	LEI; 1R	WIG; 1R	WIG; 2R	MIL; 2R	MIL; 1R	HIL; 1R	HIL; WD	LEI; 1R	LEI; 1R	LEI; 1R	LEI; 1R	MIL; 1R	MIL; 3R	WIG; 3R	WIG; 1R	LEI; 1R	LEI; 1R	HIL; 2R	HIL; 2R	LEI; 2R	LEI; 3R	ROS; 3R	ROS; 1R	ROS; 4R	ROS; QF	LEI; 2R	LEI; 4R

Performance Table Legend
W	Won the tournament	F	Finalist	SF	Semifinalist	QF	Quarterfinalist	#R; RR; Prel.	Lost in # round Round-robin; Preliminary round	DQ	Disqualified
DNQ	Did not qualify	DNP	Did not participate	WD	Withdrew	NH	Tournament not held	#R; RR; Prel.	Lost in # round Round-robin; Preliminary round	NYF	Not yet founded
