= Gian van Veen =

Dutch darts player (born 2002)

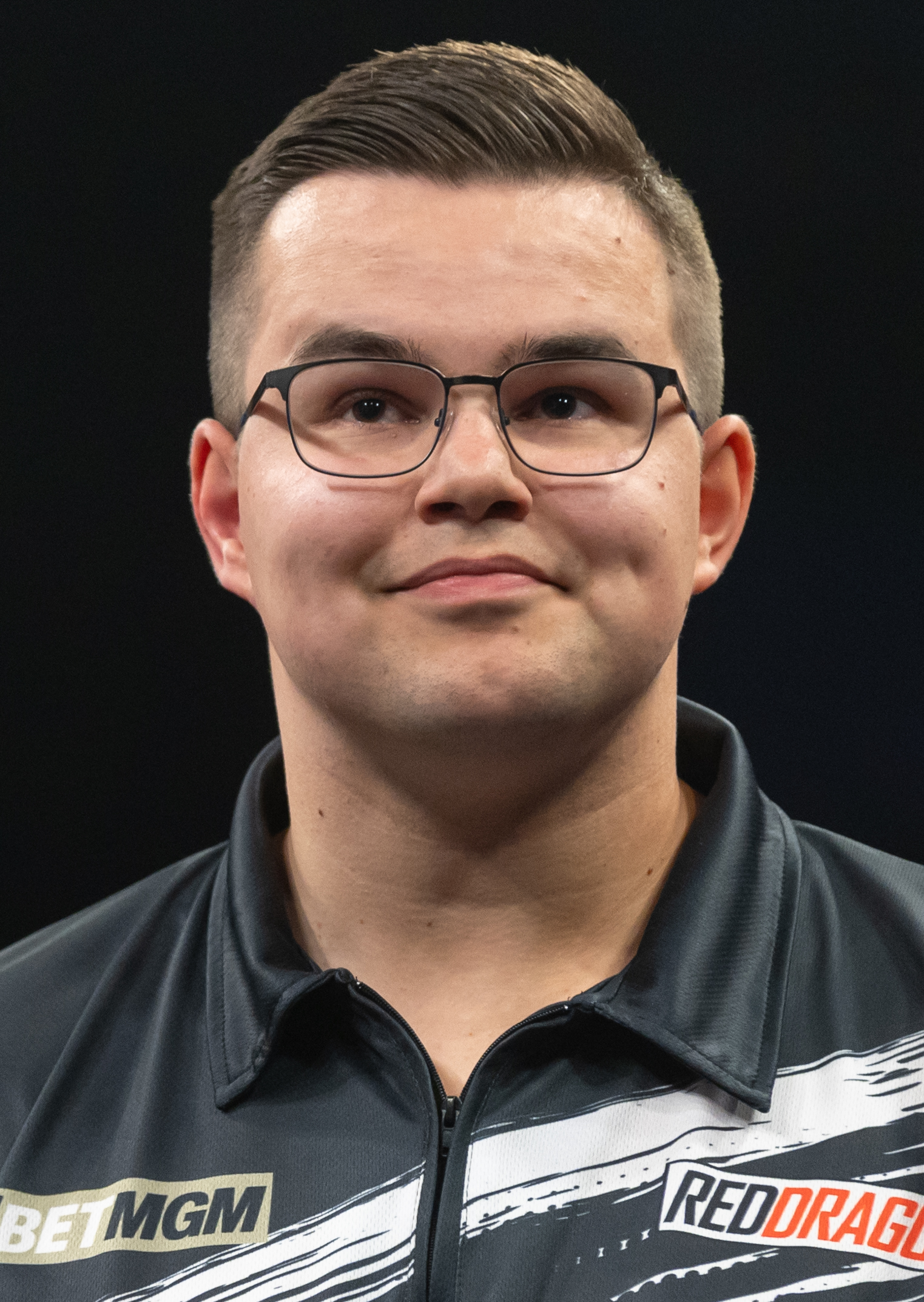
- Van Veen in 2026

Personal information
- Full name: Pieter Gerard van Veen
- Nickname: The Giant
- Born: 23 April 2002 (age 24) Poederoijen, Netherlands

Sport
- Sport: Darts
- Playing since: 2015
- Darts: 21g Winmau Signature
- Laterality: Right-handed
- Walk-on music: "Astronomia" by Tony Igy & Vicetone

Organisation (see split in darts)
- PDC: 2022–present (Tour Card: 2023–present)
- Current world ranking: (PDC) 2 ▲1 (22 November 2026)

PDC premier events – best performances
- World Championship: Runner-up: 2026
- World Matchplay: Semi-final: 2026
- World Grand Prix: Quarter-final: 2026
- UK Open: Quarter-final: 2025
- Grand Slam: Runner-up: 2026
- European Championship: Winner (1): 2025
- Premier League: 7th: 2026
- PC Finals: Last 32: 2023, 2025
- Masters: Semi-final: 2026
- World Series Finals: Semi-final: 2026

Other achievements
2023	Best Newcomer
2025	PDPA Players' Player of the Year

Pieter Gerard "Gian" van Veen (Note: Dutch pronunciation: [ˈɣiɑɱ vɑɱ ˈveːn]) (born 23 April 2002) is a Dutch professional darts player who competes in Professional Darts Corporation (PDC) events, where he is ranked world number two, his peak ranking. He won the 2025 European Championship and is the reigning back-to-back PDC world youth champion. He was also the runner-up at the 2026 PDC World Championship.

In youth darts, Van Veen won the 2024 and 2025 PDC World Youth Championships, as well as nine PDC Development Tours, including six titles in 2023 to top the 2023 Development Tour rankings. His first deep run at a major tournament came at the 2023 European Championship, where he reached the semi-finals. In 2025, he won his first PDC ranking title at Players Championship 6 and his first PDC major title at the 2025 European Championship, defeating Luke Humphries in the final on both occasions. The following year, having lost his opening match in his two prior World Championship appearances, Van Veen reached the 2026 PDC World Championship final, losing to Luke Littler.

== Career ==
=== 2022 ===
Van Veen attended 2022 PDC Pro Tour Qualifying School. He reached the final stage but lost his opening games on the first two days, losing 6–3 to Mario Vandenbogaerde in the last 16 in event three and to Ricardo Pietreczko 6–4 in the last 32 in event four. This meant he failed to gain a PDC Tour Card but gained access to the secondary tour, the 2022 Challenge Tour.

On 15 July 2022, Van Veen won his only PDC Challenge Tour (CT) title to-date at CT12, defeating David Pallett 5–4 in a deciding leg in the final.

While participating in the Challenge Tour, Van Veen suffered with dartitis, a neurological condition which makes it difficult to release a dart. Van Veen has spoken out about it, stating that dartitis actually made him play better, and that an opponent had accused him of cheating while he suffered with it.

On 4 November 2022, Van Veen reached the final of the Players Championship 29 event, losing 4–8 to Gerwyn Price in the final.

=== 2023 ===
In January 2023, he attended 2023 PDC Pro Tour Qualifying School (Q–School) and won a PDC Tour Card by finishing ninth on the European Q–School Order of Merit.

On 27 August, he reached his second Pro Tour final. He finished as the runner-up at Players Championship 18, being defeated by Gerwyn Price 8–1 in the final.

He qualified for the 2023 European Championship, held in late-October, and reached his first PDC major semi-final. He achieved victories against Damon Heta, Daryl Gurney and Michael van Gerwen. He lost to James Wade 11–9 in the semi-finals.

Van Veen won 6 titles and topped the 2023 Development Tour Order of Merit, ahead of Luke Littler. On 26 November, Littler beat Van Veen 6–4 in the 2023 PDC World Youth Championship final.

=== 2024 ===
Van Veen made his PDC World Championship debut in the 2024 edition. He was eliminated in the first round by Hong Kong qualifier Man Lok Leung, who overturned a 2–0 deficit to defeat Van Veen 3–2 in a major upset.

Van Veen won two 2024 Development Tour (DT) titles: DT5 on 25 February, with a 5–0 whitewash of Dylan Slevin in the final; and DT7 on 3 May, with a 5–1 win against Nathan Rafferty.

On 22 September 2024, he reached his third Pro Tour final at the Hungarian Darts Trophy. In his first PDC European Tour final, he finished as runner-up after missing a match dart at the bullseye. He was defeated by Michael van Gerwen 8–7. In November, he reached his second PDC major quarter-final at the Grand Slam. He was defeated by Gary Anderson 16–14. Having been defeated by Luke Littler in the previous year's final, Van Veen defeated fellow Dutchman Jurjen van der Velde 6–5 to win the 2024 World Youth Championship.

=== 2025 ===
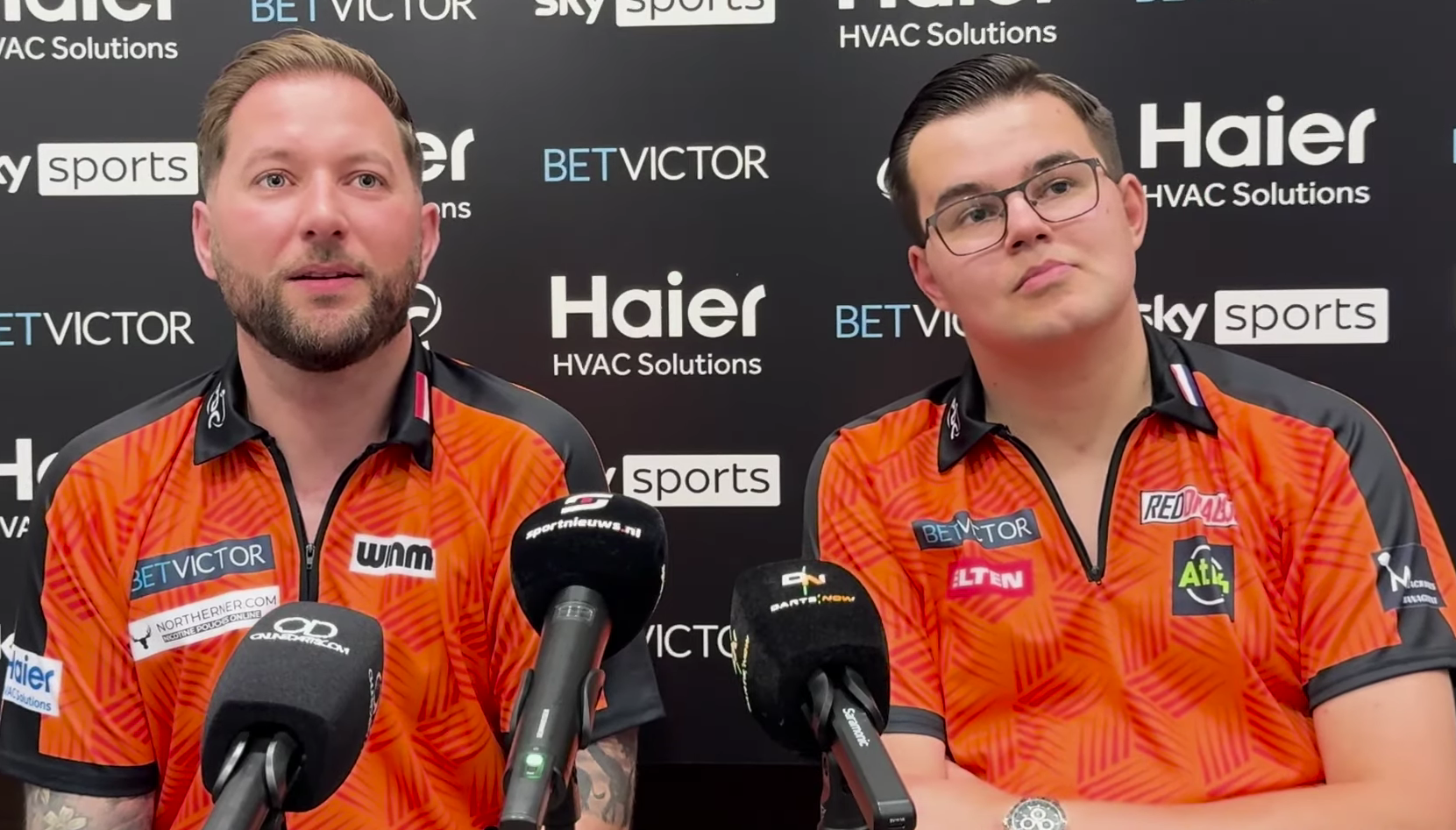
Van Veen (right) and his Dutch teammate Danny Noppert at the 2025 PDC World Cup of Darts

Van Veen entered the second round of the 2025 World Championship as the 28th seed, but lost 3–1 to Ricardo Pietreczko. Van Veen made his third UK Open appearance at the 2025 event. He reached the quarter-finals for the first time, before losing there to world champion Luke Littler 10–4. He reached the final of Players Championship 5 by defeating Luke Littler 7–6 in the semi-finals – ending Littler's 19-match winning streak. In the final, he led 7–4 against Joe Cullen but missed six match darts on his way to an 8–7 loss. The following day, he won his first ranking PDC title by winning Players Championship 6, defeating world number one Luke Humphries 8–3 in the final. He reached a second European Tour final at the German Darts Grand Prix, where he lost 8–5 to Michael van Gerwen.

Van Veen represented the Netherlands at the World Cup of Darts for the first time, teaming with Danny Noppert. The pair reached the semi-finals, where they were defeated 8–5 by runners-up Wales. Following Players Championship 30, he entered the top 16 in the world on the PDC Order of Merit for the first time. At the European Championship, Van Veen defeated Michael van Gerwen 11–9 to progress to his first PDC major final against Luke Humphries. The match went to a deciding leg, where Humphries missed a match dart and Van Veen completed a 100 checkout to win 11–10 and capture his first PDC major title, resulting in him rising to world number seven.

Van Veen faced Humphries in a rematch in the first round of the Players Championship Finals, where Van Veen was once again victorious in a deciding leg. He was eliminated by Krzysztof Ratajski in the second round. On 23 November, Van Veen won his second World Youth Championship by defeating Beau Greaves 6–3 in the final, becoming the second player to defend the title.

=== 2026 ===
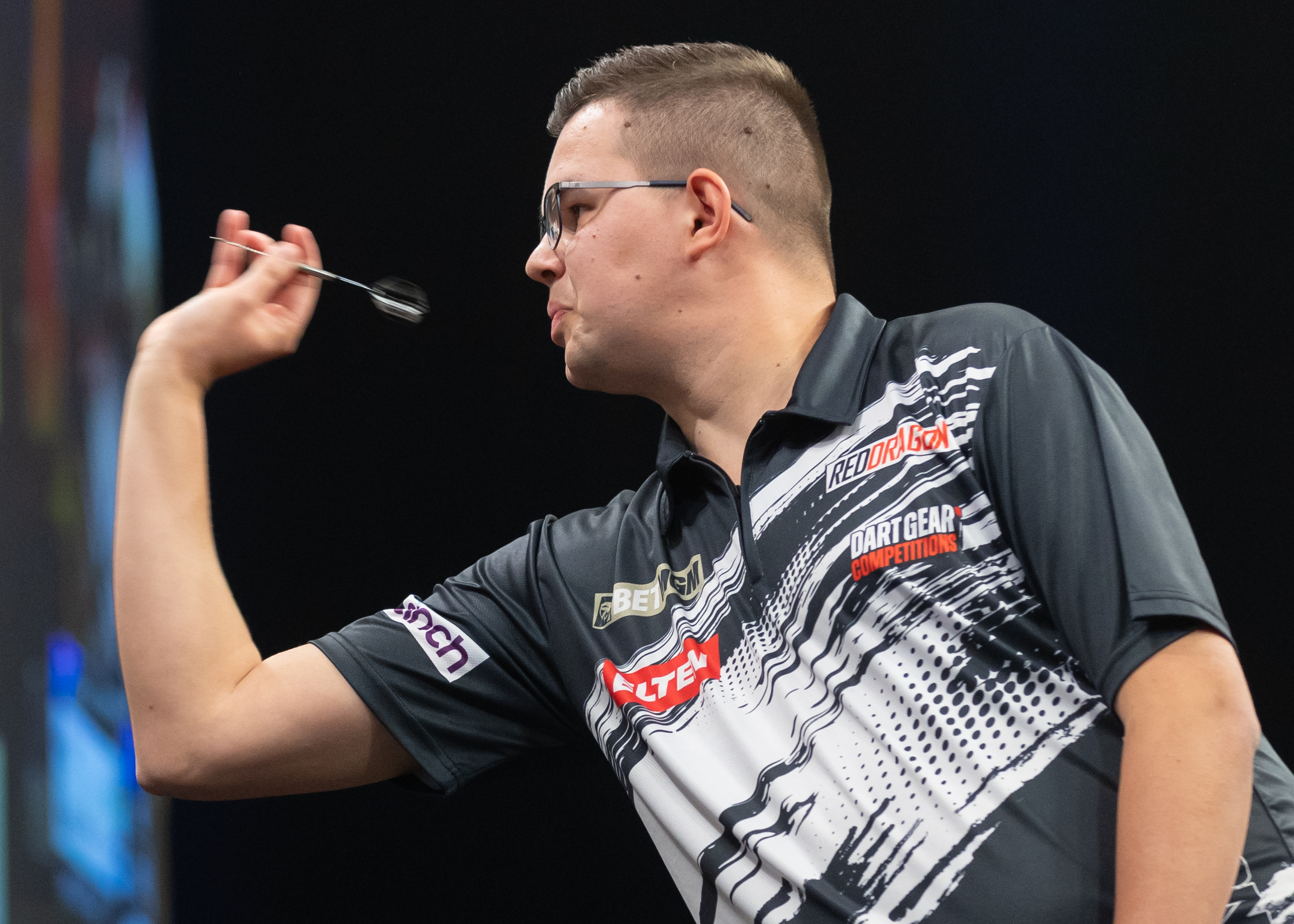
Van Veen on night eight of 2026 Premier League Darts

At the 2026 World Championship, Van Veen achieved his first win at the event by beating Cristo Reyes 3–1 in the first round. He followed this with wins over Alan Soutar, Madars Razma, Charlie Manby, Luke Humphries and Gary Anderson to reach the final for the first time in his career, before losing 7–1 to Luke Littler. Van Veen's success at the tournament saw him rise to a career-high third in the world and replace Michael van Gerwen as the Dutch number one. His rise in the world rankings also saw him qualify for the Premier League for the first time in his career.

Van Veen reached his maiden World Series final at the Bahrain Darts Masters, where he lost 8–6 to Michael van Gerwen. He faced Luke Littler in a World Championship rematch at the inaugural Poland Darts Open, where he hit a nine-dart finish but was beaten 8–4 in the final. In his first Premier League campaign, Van Veen finished seventh in the league table on 18 points. At the World Cup of Darts, he partnered Van Gerwen for the Netherlands and the pair reached the final, where they were defeated 10–5 by England. In July, Van Veen reached his first World Matchplay semi-final, where he was beaten 17–10 by Gerwyn Price.

== Personal life ==
Van Veen was born Pieter Gerard van Veen on 23 April 2002 in Poederoijen, a village in the Dutch province of Gelderland. His parents gave him the name "Gian" in honour of a young boy from their neighbourhood named Gian who had died. He is colourblind. He is a supporter of the Dutch football club FC Den Bosch.

Van Veen studied aerospace engineering and earned a bachelor's degree in aviation in 2023. He worked a part-time office job near Amsterdam Airport Schiphol before pursuing darts full-time. In 2026, Van Veen underwent surgery to remove kidney stones, which caused him to miss a night of the 2026 Premier League in Dublin.

== World Championship results ==
=== PDC World Championship ===
- 2024: First round (lost to Man Lok Leung 2–3)
- 2025: Second round (lost to Ricardo Pietreczko 1–3)
- 2026: Runner-up (lost to Luke Littler 1–7)

== Career finals ==
=== PDC major finals: 3 (1 title, 2 runner-up) ===
Legend
World Championship (0–1)
Grand Slam (0-1)
European Championship (1–0)

Outcome	No.	Year	Championship	Opponent in the final	Score (Note: (l) = score in legs, (s) = score in sets)
Winner	1.	2025	European Championship	Luke Humphries	11–10 (l)
Runner-up	1.	2026	World Championship	Luke Littler	1–7 (s)
Runner-up	1.	2026	Grand Slam	Gerwyn Price	11–16 (l)

=== PDC World Series finals: 1 (1 runner-up) ===
Outcome	No.	Year	Championship	Opponent in the final	Score
Runner-up	1.	2026	Bahrain Darts Masters	Michael van Gerwen	6–8 (l)

=== PDC team finals: 1 (1 runner-up) ===
Outcome	No.	Year	Championship	Team	Teammate	Opponents in the final	Score
Runner-up	1.	2026	World Cup of Darts	Netherlands	Michael van Gerwen	England – Luke Littler and Luke Humphries	5–10 (l)

== Performance timeline ==
=== PDC ===
Tournament	2020	2022	2023	2024	2025	2026
PDC Ranked televised events
World Championship	Did not qualify			1R	2R	F
World Masters (Note: A non-ranked event until 2025)	Did not qualify				Prel.	SF
UK Open	DNQ		3R	6R	QF	4R
World Matchplay	Did not qualify			1R	QF	SF
World Grand Prix	Did not qualify			1R	1R	QF
European Championship	DNP		SF	1R	W	2R
Grand Slam	DNQ		RR	QF	RR	F
Players Championship Finals	DNP	1R	2R	1R	2R	
PDC Non-ranked televised events
Premier League	Did not participate					7th
World Cup	Did not participate				SF	F
World Series Finals	Did not participate			1R	DNQ	SF
World Youth Championship	2R	RR	F	W	W	DNP
Career statistics
Season-end ranking (PDC)	NR	103	43	27	3	

==== Premier League ====
Season	1	2	3	4	5	6	7	8	9	10	11	12	13	14	15	16	F
2026	NEW; F	ANT; QF	GLA; F	BEL; F	CAR; QF	NOT; QF	DUB; QF	BER; QF	MAN; F	BRI; QF	ROT; QF	LIV; SF	ABD; SF	LEE; QF	BIR; SF	SHF; QF	LON; DNQ

==== European Tour ====
Season	1	2	3	4	5	6	7	8	9	10	11	12	13	14	15
2022	IDO; DNQ	GDC; 1R	Did not qualify									BDO; 1R	GDT; DNQ		
2023	Did not qualify					DDC; 1R	DNQ		EDG; QF	EDM; QF	GDO; 2R	HDT; 3R	GDC; 2R		
2024	BDO; 1R	GDG; 2R	IDO; 2R	EDG; 1R	ADO; QF	BSD; 2R	DDC; 3R	EDO; QF	GDC; 3R	FDT; 3R	HDT; F	SDT; 2R	CDO; 3R		
2025	BDO; 2R	EDT; 3R	IDO; 2R	GDG; F	ADO; 2R	EDG; 2R	DDC; 1R	EDO; 2R	BSD; 2R	FDT; QF	CDO; SF	HDT; 1R	SDT; SF	GDC; SF	
2026	PDO; F	EDT; 3R	BDO; WD	GDG; 2R	EDG; 2R	ADO; 2R	IDO; QF	BSD; 3R	SDO; 2R	EDO; 3R	HDT; QF	CDO; 3R	FDT; SF	SDT; SF	DDC; SF

==== Players Championships ====
Season	1	2	3	4	5	6	7	8	9	10	11	12	13	14	15	16	17	18	19	20	21	22	23	24	25	26	27	28	29	30	31	32	33	34
2022 (Note: Not a Tour Card holder)	Did not participate																					BAR; 1R	BAR; 2R	BAR; 2R	BAR; QF	BAR; 3R	BAR; 3R	BAR; 3R	BAR; F	BAR; 3R				
2023	BAR; 1R	BAR; 1R	BAR; QF	BAR; 1R	BAR; 2R	BAR; QF	HIL; 1R	HIL; QF	WIG; 1R	WIG; 3R	LEI; 2R	LEI; 1R	HIL; 1R	HIL; 1R	LEI; 1R	LEI; DNP	HIL; 2R	HIL; F	BAR; 4R	BAR; 2R	BAR; 3R	BAR; 1R	BAR; 2R	BAR; 3R	BAR; 2R	BAR; 2R	BAR; SF	BAR; 2R	BAR; QF	BAR; SF				
2024	WIG; SF	WIG; 4R	LEI; 2R	LEI; 4R	HIL; 3R	HIL; 1R	LEI; 3R	LEI; SF	HIL; 4R	HIL; 4R	HIL; 3R	HIL; 4R	MIL; 2R	MIL; 1R	MIL; 2R	MIL; 2R	MIL; 3R	MIL; 1R	MIL; 3R	WIG; 4R	WIG; QF	MIL; 3R	MIL; 2R	WIG; 4R	WIG; 2R	WIG; 1R	WIG; 1R	WIG; 1R	LEI; 3R	LEI; 1R				
2025	WIG; 4R	WIG; QF	ROS; 1R	ROS; 2R	LEI; F	LEI; W	HIL; 3R	HIL; 2R	LEI; 4R	LEI; 2R	LEI; 1R	LEI; SF	ROS; 4R	ROS; 2R	HIL; QF	HIL; 3R	LEI; SF	LEI; 3R	LEI; QF	LEI; 3R	LEI; 2R	HIL; QF	HIL; 4R	MIL; 1R	MIL; QF	HIL; F	HIL; 1R	LEI; 4R	LEI; 3R	LEI; 3R	WIG; 1R	WIG; DNP		
2026	HIL; 2R	HIL; 1R	WIG; 2R	WIG; 2R	Did not participate						MIL; 3R	MIL; 1R	HIL; DNP		LEI; 4R	LEI; 1R	LEI; 3R	LEI; 1R	MIL; 1R	MIL; 1R	WIG; 2R	WIG; QF	LEI; 1R	LEI; SF	HIL; 2R	HIL; SF	LEI; DNP		ROS; F	ROS; DNP	ROS; 3R	DNP		

==== World Series ====
Tournament	2024	2025	2026
Dutch Masters	SF	1R	NH
Bahrain Masters	DNP		F
Saudi Masters	NH		QF
Nordic Masters	DNP		QF
US Masters	DNP		SF
New Zealand Masters	DNP		QF
Australian Masters	DNP		QF

==== Development Tour ====
Season	1	2	3	4	5	6	7	8	9	10	11	12	13	14	15	16	17	18	19	20	21	22	23	24
2021 EU	NIE; SF	NIE; 4R	NIE; 5R	NIE; 4R	NIE; 4R	NIE; QF	NIE; 5R	NIE; 1R	NIE; 4R	NIE; 3R	NIE; 4R	NIE; 4R												
2022	Did not participate					WIG; 1R	WIG; 2R	WIG; 2R	WIG; 3R	WIG; SF	HIL; F	HIL; 4R	HIL; 4R	HIL; 3R	HIL; 3R	HIL; 3R	HIL; 2R	HIL; W	HIL; 2R	HIL; 2R	WIG; QF	WIG; QF	WIG; 1R	WIG; 1R
2023	MIL; 3R	MIL; 3R	MIL; 1R	MIL; W	MIL; QF	WIG; DNP		WIG; W	WIG; 5R	WIG; W	HIL; 5R	HIL; SF	HIL; W	HIL; 5R	HIL; 2R	LEI; 3R	LEI; W	LEI; QF	LEI; F	LEI; F	MIL; 1R	MIL; SF	MIL; W	MIL; 3R
2024	MIL; 2R	MIL; F	MIL; QF	MIL; 6R	MIL; W	HIL; SF	HIL; W	HIL; QF	HIL; 6R	HIL; F	Not eligible (Note: Van Veen was ranked in the top 32 of the PDC Order of Merit ranking, therefore was not eligible to play in Development Tour events.)													

Performance Table Legend
W	Won the tournament	F	Finalist	SF	Semifinalist	QF	Quarterfinalist	#R; RR; Prel.	Lost in # round Round-robin; Preliminary round	DQ	Disqualified
DNQ	Did not qualify	DNP	Did not participate	WD	Withdrew	NH	Tournament not held	#R; RR; Prel.	Lost in # round Round-robin; Preliminary round	NYF	Not yet founded

== Titles ==
=== PDC titles ===
- Majors (1)
  - 2025: European Championship
- PDC Pro Tour (1)
  - Players Championships (1):
    - 2025 (×1): 6
- PDC Secondary Tours
  - PDC Challenge Tour (1)
    - 2022 (×1): 12
  - PDC Development Tour (9)
    - 2022 (×1): 18
    - 2023 (×6): 4, 8, 10, 13, 17, 23
    - 2024 (×2) : 5, 7
  - PDC World Youth Championship (2)
    - 2024, 2025

=== BDO/WDF titles ===
- Youth titles (2)
  - 2018 Denmark Masters
  - 2019 Belfry Open
