= 2024 Belgian Darts Open =

2024 edition of Blåkläder Belgian Darts Open

2024 Blåkläder Belgian Darts Open

Tournament information
- Dates: 8–10 March 2024
- Venue: Oktoberhallen
- Location: Wieze, Belgium
- Organisation(s): Professional Darts Corporation (PDC)
- Format: Legs
- Prize fund: £175,000
- Winner's share: £30,000
- Nine-dart finish: Luke Littler
- High checkout: 170; Jonny Clayton; Joe Cullen (x2)

Champion(s)
- Luke Littler

The 2024 Belgian Darts Open (known for sponsorship reasons as the 2024 Blåkläder Belgian Darts Open) was a professional darts tournament that took place at the Oktoberhallen in Wieze, Belgium from 8 to 10 March 2024. It was the first of thirteen European Tour events on the 2024 PDC Pro Tour. It featured a field of 48 players and £175,000 in prize money, with £30,000 going to the winner.

Michael van Gerwen was the defending champion, defeating Luke Humphries 8–6 in the 2023 final, but he was eliminated in the second round after a 6–4 loss to Peter Wright.

Luke Littler won the title on his European Tour debut, beating Rob Cross 8–7 in the final. Littler also hit a nine-dart finish in this match.

== Prize money ==
The prize fund remained at £175,000, with £30,000 to the winner:

Stage (num. of players)		Prize money
Winner	(1)	£30,000
Runner-up	(1)	£12,000
Semi-finalists	(2)	£8,500
Quarter-finalists	(4)	£6,000
Third round losers	(8)	£4,000
Second round losers	(16)	£2,500*
First round losers	(16)	£1,250*
Total	£175,000	

- Pre-qualified players from the Orders of Merit who lose in their first match of the event shall not be credited with prize money on any Order of Merit. A player who qualifies as a qualifier, but later becomes a seed due to the withdrawal of one or more other players shall be credited with their prize money on all Orders of Merit regardless of how far they progress in the event.

== Qualification and format ==
A massive overhaul in the qualification for the 2024 European Tour events was announced on 7 January.

For the first time, both the PDC Order of Merit and the PDC Pro Tour Order of Merit rankings were used to determine 32 of the 48 entrants for the event. The top 16 on the PDC Order of Merit qualified, along with the highest 16 ranked players on the PDC ProTour Order of Merit (after the PDC Order of Merit players were removed). From those 32 players, the 16 highest ranked players on the PDC ProTour Order of Merit were seeded for the event. The seedings were confirmed on 6 February.

The remaining 16 places went to players from four qualifying events – 10 from the Tour Card Holder Qualifier (held on 14 February), four from the Host Nation Qualifier (held on 7 March), one from the Nordic & Baltic Associate Member Qualifier (held on 16 February), and one from the East European Associate Member Qualifier (held on 10 February).

The following players took part in the tournament:

Seeded Players

1. Dave Chisnall (second round)
2. Luke Humphries (third round)
3. Gerwyn Price (semi-finals)
4. Damon Heta (third round)
5. Dirk van Duijvenbode (second round)
6. Josh Rock (second round)
7. Rob Cross (runner-up)
8. Michael van Gerwen (second round)
9. Jonny Clayton (quarter-finals)
10. Danny Noppert (third round)
11. Michael Smith (second round)
12. Ross Smith (second round)
13. Krzysztof Ratajski (second round)
14. Gary Anderson (third round)
15. Ryan Searle (quarter-finals)
16. Ricardo Pietreczko (semi-finals)

Order of Merit Qualifiers
- Nathan Aspinall (first round)
- Peter Wright (third round)
- Joe Cullen (third round)
- Dimitri Van den Bergh (first round)
- Chris Dobey (second round)
- Stephen Bunting (quarter-finals)
- Martin Schindler (first round)
- Andrew Gilding (first round)
- Daryl Gurney (first round)
- James Wade (second round)
- Gian van Veen (first round)
- Ryan Joyce (third round)
- Gabriel Clemens (second round)
- José de Sousa (first round)
- Brendan Dolan (second round)
- Raymond van Barneveld (first round)

Tour Card Qualifier
- Mike De Decker (third round)
- Luke Woodhouse (second round)
- Lukas Wenig (second round)
- Jermaine Wattimena (quarter-finals)
- James Hurrell (first round)
- Richard Veenstra (second round)
- Daniel Klose (first round)
- Luke Littler (champion)
- Berry van Peer (second round)
- Chris Landman (first round)

Host Nation Qualifier
- Geert De Vos (first round)
- Born Van Put (first round)
- Jeroen Caron (first round)
- Steven Strobbe (first round)

Nordic & Baltic Qualifier
- Andreas Harrysson (second round)

East European Qualifier
- Romeo Grbavac (first round)

== Draw ==
Numbers to the left of players' names show the seedings for the top 16 in the tournament. The figures to the right of a player's name state their three-dart average in a match. Players in bold denote match winners.

**First round** (best of 11 legs); 8 March
**Ryan Joyce 91.65**	**6**
Andrew Gilding 89.23	3
**Luke Woodhouse 94.15**	**6**
James Hurrell 88.88	3
**Peter Wright 89.53**	**6**
Geert De Vos 81.86	2
**Berry van Peer 90.52**	**6**
Daniel Klose 91.28	3
**Brendan Dolan 86.15**	**6**
Steven Strobbe 70.87	2
**Luke Littler 101.86**	**6**
José de Sousa 95.13	5
Martin Schindler 91.81	1
**Joe Cullen 103.57**	**6**
Daryl Gurney 91.93	0
**Jermaine Wattimena 98.02**	**6**
**James Wade 96.18**	**6**
Raymond van Barneveld 89.93	5
Nathan Aspinall 88.32	3
**Richard Veenstra 90.74**	**6**
**Lukas Wenig 87.75**	**6**
Born Van Put 76.36	3
**Chris Dobey 95.59**	**6**
Romeo Grbavac 85.01	3
Jeroen Caron 86.45	0
**Gabriel Clemens 101.33**	**6**
**Andreas Harrysson 107.27**	**6**
Gian van Veen 100.72	1
Dimitri Van den Bergh 93.51	5
**Stephen Bunting 99.87**	**6**
**Mike De Decker 91.03**	**6**
Chris Landman 85.21	5

**Second round** (best of 11 legs); 9 March
1	Dave Chisnall 89.40	5
**Ryan Joyce 89.25**	**6**
**16**	**Ricardo Pietreczko 93.75**	**6**
Luke Woodhouse 91.09	5
8	Michael van Gerwen 93.00	4
**Peter Wright 91.81**	**6**
**9**	**Jonny Clayton 98.58**	**6**
Berry van Peer 93.80	4
**4**	**Damon Heta 88.72**	**6**
Brendan Dolan 86.20	1
13	Krzysztof Ratajski 95.60	3
**Luke Littler 97.05**	**6**
5	Dirk van Duijvenbode 92.22	3
**Joe Cullen 104.40**	**6**
12	Ross Smith 85.38	2
**Jermaine Wattimena 91.93**	**6**
**2**	**Luke Humphries 110.65**	**6**
James Wade 89.19	1
**15**	**Ryan Searle 97.45**	**6**
Richard Veenstra 90.76	5
**7**	**Rob Cross 96.33**	**6**
Lukas Wenig 92.30	5
**10**	**Danny Noppert 99.60**	**6**
Chris Dobey 91.06	5
**3**	**Gerwyn Price 101.21**	**6**
Gabriel Clemens 92.90	4
**14**	**Gary Anderson 102.97**	**6**
Andreas Harrysson 96.90	5
6	Josh Rock 99.22	5
**Stephen Bunting 97.79**	**6**
11	Michael Smith 87.55	2
**Mike De Decker 94.35**	**6**

**Third round** (best of 11 legs); 10 March
Joyce 89.92	4
**16**	**Pietreczko 92.12**	**6**
Wright 100.02	4
**9**	**Clayton 104.06**	**6**
4	Heta 99.82	3
**Littler 101.23**	**6**
Cullen 82.68	3
**Wattimena 89.26**	**6**
2	Humphries 101.56	3
**15**	**Searle 94.74**	**6**
**7**	**Cross 97.32**	**6**
10	Noppert 90.38	1
**3**	**Price 104.87**	**6**
14	Anderson 101.45	4
**Bunting 102.22**	**6**
De Decker 94.89	3

**Quarter-finals** (best of 11 legs); 10 March
**16**	**Pietreczko 82.83**	**6**
9	Clayton 80.82	2
**Littler 110.06**	**6**
Wattimena 102.74	2
15	Searle 93.78	2
**7**	**Cross 97.86**	**6**
**3**	**Price 98.60**	**6**
Bunting 102.71	4

**Semi-finals** (best of 13 legs); 10 March
16	Pietreczko 90.69	3
**Littler 104.25**	**7**
**7**	**Cross 97.37**	**7**
3	Price 97.67	3

**Final** (best of 15 legs); 10 March
**Littler 103.76**	**8**
7	Cross 108.00	7
