= 2023 European Championship (darts) =

2023 Machineseeker European Championship

Tournament information
- Dates: 26–29 October 2023
- Venue: Westfalenhallen
- Location: Dortmund, Germany
- Organisation(s): Professional Darts Corporation (PDC)
- Format: Legs
- Prize fund: £600,000
- Winner's share: £120,000
- High checkout: 170 Chris Dobey (second round)

Champion(s)
- Peter Wright

The 2023 Machineseeker European Championship was the sixteenth edition of the Professional Darts Corporation's European Championship tournament, which sees the top players from the thirteen European tour events compete against each other. The tournament took place from 26 to 29 October 2023 at the Westfalenhallen in Dortmund, Germany.

Ross Smith was the defending champion, having beaten Michael Smith in the 2022 final. He became the fifth consecutive defending champion to lose in the first round after a 6–3 defeat to Ricardo Pietreczko.

Peter Wright won the tournament for the second time after beating James Wade 11–6 in the final.

== Prize money ==
The 2023 European Championship had a total prize fund of £600,000, up from £500,000 in 2022.

The following is the breakdown of the fund:

Position (no. of players)		Prize money (Total: £600,000)
Winner	(1)	£120,000
Runner-Up	(1)	£60,000
Semi-finalists	(2)	£40,000
Quarter-finalists	(4)	£25,000
Last 16 (second round)	(8)	£15,000
Last 32 (first round)	(16)	£7,500

== Qualification ==
The 2023 tournament continued the established qualification system whereby the top 32 players from the European Tour Order of Merit qualified for the tournament. The Order of Merit is solely based on prize money won in the thirteen European tour events during the season.

As with the previous editions, players were drawn in a fixed bracket by their seeded order with the top qualifier playing the 32nd, the second playing the 31st and so on.

The following players qualified for the tournament:

1. Dave Chisnall (first round)
2. Luke Humphries (quarter-finals)
3. Michael van Gerwen (quarter-finals)
4. Gerwyn Price (quarter-finals)
5. Rob Cross (second round)
6. Damon Heta (first round)
7. Dirk van Duijvenbode (first round)
8. Michael Smith (second round)
9. Peter Wright (champion)
10. Jonny Clayton (first round)
11. Josh Rock (first round)
12. Danny Noppert (semi-finals)
13. Nathan Aspinall (second round)
14. Ricardo Pietreczko (second round)
15. Krzysztof Ratajski (second round)
16. Martin Schindler (first round)
17. Stephen Bunting (second round)
18. Joe Cullen (first round)
19. Ross Smith (first round)
20. Ryan Searle (first round)
21. Andrew Gilding (first round)
22. Daryl Gurney (second round)
23. José de Sousa (second round)
24. Gabriel Clemens (first round)
25. Raymond van Barneveld (first round)
26. James Wade (runner-up)
27. Gian van Veen (semi-finals)
28. Dimitri Van den Bergh (first round)
29. Keane Barry (first round)
30. Madars Razma (first round)
31. Brendan Dolan (first round)
32. Chris Dobey (quarter-finals)

== Draw ==
First round (best of 11 legs); 26–27 October
1	Dave Chisnall 94.91	2
32	Chris Dobey 95.27	6
16	Martin Schindler 95.87	1
17	Stephen Bunting 101.42	6
8	Michael Smith 98.80	6
25	Raymond van Barneveld 90.17	1
9	Peter Wright 94.83	6
24	Gabriel Clemens 97.94	5
4	Gerwyn Price 91.66	6
29	Keane Barry 84.13	1
13	Nathan Aspinall 98.47	6
20	Ryan Searle 95.80	3
5	Rob Cross 99.87	6
28	Dimitri Van den Bergh 92.47	2
12	Danny Noppert 106.09	6
21	Andrew Gilding 89.31	0
2	Luke Humphries 97.10	6
31	Brendan Dolan 90.91	1
15	Krzysztof Ratajski 94.21	6
18	Joe Cullen 98.81	3
7	Dirk van Duijvenbode 75.71	3
26	James Wade 80.06	6
10	Jonny Clayton 91.00	4
23	José de Sousa 89.22	6
3	Michael van Gerwen 97.86	6
30	Madars Razma 104.92	5
14	Ricardo Pietreczko 104.28	6
19	Ross Smith 98.59	3
6	Damon Heta 98.47	1
27	Gian van Veen 107.34	6
11	Josh Rock 100.15	2
22	Daryl Gurney 98.62	6

Second round (best of 19 legs); 28 October
32	Chris Dobey 97.64	10
17	Stephen Bunting 96.05	8
8	Michael Smith 92.32	4
9	Peter Wright 96.47	10
4	Gerwyn Price 102.27	10
13	Nathan Aspinall 93.89	5
5	Rob Cross 92.86	7
12	Danny Noppert 93.54	10
2	Luke Humphries 96.96	10
15	Krzysztof Ratajski 94.83	5
26	James Wade 95.53	10
23	José de Sousa 82.58	1
3	Michael van Gerwen 104.12	10
14	Ricardo Pietreczko 95.19	7
27	Gian van Veen 93.61	10
22	Daryl Gurney 88.41	6

Quarter-finals (best of 19 legs); 29 October
32	Chris Dobey 99.17	8
9	Peter Wright 99.61	10
4	Gerwyn Price 96.92	8
12	Danny Noppert 101.03	10
2	Luke Humphries 95.06	6
26	James Wade 98.41	10
3	Michael van Gerwen 93.75	6
27	Gian van Veen 93.67	10

Semi-finals (best of 21 legs); 29 October
9	Peter Wright 100.42	11
12	Danny Noppert 97.01	8
26	James Wade 93.63	11
27	Gian van Veen 89.69	9

Final (best of 21 legs); 29 October
9	Peter Wright 97.39	11
26	James Wade 92.09	6
