= 2026 Czech Darts Open =

2026 ČEZ Czech Darts Open

Tournament information
- Dates: 4–6 September 2026
- Venue: PVA Expo
- Location: Prague, Czech Republic
- Organisation(s): Professional Darts Corporation (PDC)
- Format: Legs
- Prize fund: £230,000
- Winner's share: £35,000
- High checkout: 170 Martin Schindler

Champion(s)
- Luke Littler (ENG)

The 2026 Czech Darts Open (known for sponsorship reasons as the 2026 ČEZ Czech Darts Open) was a professional darts tournament that took place at the PVA Expo in Prague, Czech Republic, from 4 to 6 September 2026. It was the twelfth of fifteen PDC European Tour events on the 2026 PDC Pro Tour. It featured a field of 48 players and £230,000 in prize money, with £35,000 going to the winner.

Beau Greaves became the first woman to win a European Tour match, defeating Daryl Gurney 6–4 in the first round. Luke Humphries was the defending champion, having defeated Josh Rock 8–5 in the 2025 final.

Luke Littler won his sixth European Tour title by defeating Humphries 8–6 in the final.

== Prize money ==
As part of a mass boost in prize money for Professional Darts Corporation (PDC) events in 2026, the prize fund for all 2026 European Tour events rose to £230,000, of which the winner will receive £35,000.

Stage (num. of players)		Prize money
Winner	(1)	£35,000
Runner-up	(1)	£15,000
Semi-finalists	(2)	£10,000
Quarter-finalists	(4)	£8,000
Third round losers	(8)	£5,000
Second round losers	(16)	£3,500*
First round losers	(16)	£2,000*
Total	£230,000	

- Pre-qualified players from the Orders of Merit who lose in their first match of the event shall not be credited with prize money on any Order of Merit.

== Qualification and format ==
The top 16 players on the two-year PDC Order of Merit were seeded and entered the tournament in the second round, while the next 16 highest-ranked players from the one-year PDC Pro Tour Order of Merit automatically qualified for the first round. The seedings were confirmed on 2 July. The remaining 16 places went to players from four qualifying events – 10 from the Tour Card Holder Qualifier (held on 8 July), four from the Host Nation Qualifier (held on 3 September), one from the Nordic & Baltic Associate Member Qualifier (held on 16 May), and one from the East European Associate Member Qualifier (held on 4 July).

James Wade withdrew and was replaced by Ricky Evans, with Jermaine Wattimena moving up to 16th seed.

Seeded players

1. Luke Littler (ENG) (champion)
2. Luke Humphries (ENG) (runner-up)
3. Gian van Veen (NED) (third round)
4. Michael van Gerwen (NED) (semi-finals)
5. Jonny Clayton (WAL) (quarter-finals)
6. Gerwyn Price (WAL) (semi-finals)
7. Josh Rock (NIR) (third round)
8. Stephen Bunting (ENG) (second round)
9. Danny Noppert (NED) (quarter-finals)
10. Ryan Searle (ENG) (second round)
11. Gary Anderson (SCO) (second round)
12. Chris Dobey (ENG) (second round)
13. Wessel Nijman (NED) (third round)
14. Ross Smith (ENG) (quarter-finals)
15. Nathan Aspinall (ENG) (second round)
16. Jermaine Wattimena (NED) (second round)

PDC Pro Tour Order of Merit qualifiers
- Luke Woodhouse (ENG) (third round)
- Kevin Doets (NED) (second round)
- Andrew Gilding (ENG) (third round)
- Rob Cross (ENG) (first round)
- Krzysztof Ratajski (POL) (third round)
- Niko Springer (GER) (second round)
- William O'Connor (IRL) (quarter-finals)
- Niels Zonneveld (NED) (first round)
- Martin Schindler (GER) (second round)
- Dirk van Duijvenbode (NED) (first round)
- Ryan Joyce (ENG) (second round)
- Damon Heta (AUS) (second round)
- Joe Cullen (ENG) (first round)
- Daryl Gurney (NIR) (first round)
- Cameron Menzies (SCO) (third round)

Tour Card qualifier
- Rob Owen (WAL) (first round)
- Connor Scutt (ENG) (first round)
- Cristo Reyes (ESP) (first round)
- Beau Greaves (ENG) (second round)
- Jeffrey de Graaf (SWE) (second round)
- Stephen Burton (ENG) (second round)
- Kim Huybrechts (BEL) (first round)
- Callan Rydz (ENG) (second round)
- Keane Barry (IRL) (third round)
- Mario Vandenbogaerde (BEL) (second round)
Host Nation qualifier
- Karel Sedláček (CZE) (first round)
- David Rosí (CZE) (first round)
- Adam Gawlas (CZE) (first round)
- Jiří Brejcha (CZE) (first round)
Nordic & Baltic qualifier
- Johan Engström (SWE) (first round)
East European qualifier
- Martin Homola (SVK) (first round)
Reserve list
- Ricky Evans (ENG) (first round)

== Summary ==
=== First round ===
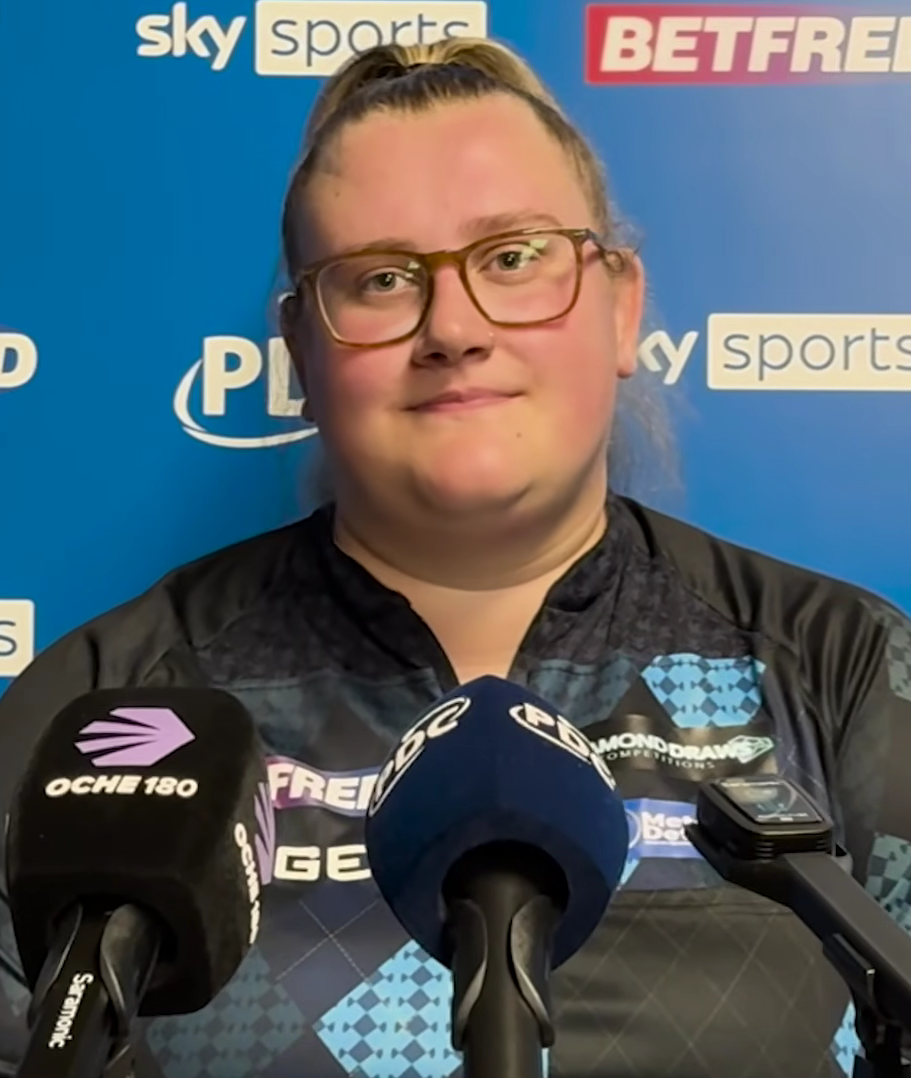
Beau Greaves (pictured in 2026) became the first woman to win a European Tour match, defeating Daryl Gurney 6–4 in the first round.

The first round (best of 11 legs) was played on 4 September. Facing Daryl Gurney in a rematch of their first-round tie at the 2026 World Championship, Beau Greaves overturned a 3–1 deficit to defeat Gurney 6–4 and become the first woman to win a match on the European Tour. "It's just so nice to win a game, I was so nervous at the start, I don't know why. It took me so long to get settled, but luckily I did enough to win the game," said Greaves, who progressed to a second-round meeting with world number two Luke Humphries. All four Czech qualifiers were eliminated in the opening round: Karel Sedláček was beaten 6–4 by Damon Heta, Adam Gawlas was defeated 6–2 by Krzysztof Ratajski, Jiří Brejcha lost 6–1 to William O'Connor, and European Tour newcomer David Rosí lost 6–3 to Andrew Gilding. Luke Woodhouse and Kevin Doets recorded three-dart averages of 104.30 and 100.68, respectively, in their wins over Connor Scutt and Ricky Evans. Stephen Burton achieved his second win on the European Tour with a 6–3 victory against Joe Cullen, who suffered his sixth straight loss at the Czech Darts Open.

Niko Springer averaged 102.48 and hit a 150 checkout as he earned a whitewash win against Slovak debutant Martin Homola. On facing top seed Luke Littler in the next round, Springer commented: "I have nothing to lose to be honest. I'm feeling very confident. Of course it will be hard, but it's best of 11, so let's go, I'm ready." The 2018 world champion Rob Cross lost 6–4 to Keane Barry, while Dirk van Duijvenbode suffered a 6–2 defeat to Mario Vandenbogaerde. Ryan Joyce capitalised on two missed match darts from Kim Huybrechts to beat the Belgian in a deciding leg. Martin Schindler and Jeffrey de Graaf were 6–4 victors against Robert Owen and Niels Zonneveld, respectively. Callan Rydz defeated Cristo Reyes 6–1, while Cameron Menzies beat Swedish qualifier Johan Engström by the same scoreline to set up a second-round match against Scottish compatriot Gary Anderson.

=== Second round ===
Defending champion Luke Humphries (pictured in 2026) began his title defence by defeating Beau Greaves 6–2. He went on to reach his third consecutive Czech Darts Open final.

The second round (best of 11 legs) was played on 5 September. Defending champion Luke Humphries won his opening match 6–2 against Beau Greaves, winning the last three legs consecutively and averaging 108.98 in the process. Humphries praised his opponent in his post-match interview, saying she was an amazing player who "pushed [him] all the way". "If I had lost today, I wouldn't have been disgraced, I would have lost to a really great dart player," he concluded. World champion Luke Littler returned to the European Tour after missing the previous eight events and averaged 108.59 in a 6–4 victory over Niko Springer. Speaking afterwards, Littler said that, despite his high match average, he "couldn't hit anything" during practice. He also gave credit to Springer for being competitive after going 5–2 behind. Dutch compatriots Gian van Veen and Michael van Gerwen, the third and fourth seed, began their respective campaigns with victories over Jeffrey de Graaf and Mario Vandenbogaerde. Josh Rock, the 2025 runner-up, defeated Ryan Joyce 6–3. Welsh duo Jonny Clayton and Gerwyn Price were 6–2 winners against Damon Heta and Callan Rydz, respectively. Eighth seed Stephen Bunting was the only Premier League player to be eliminated in the second round as he lost 6–4 to Luke Woodhouse, who averaged 105.30 in victory.

After taking a 5–0 lead, Andrew Gilding completed a 6–2 win against fifteenth seed Nathan Aspinall with a 122 checkout. "This place absolutely loves me, I don't really know why that is, I get so much support, I just love being here," said Gilding, who set up a third-round meeting with Humphries. Ross Smith, the winner of the Hungarian Darts Trophy the previous week, defeated Stephen Burton 6–1. Martin Schindler hit a 170 checkout before losing 6–5 to Wessel Nijman. William O'Connor won four legs in a row to defeat tenth seed Ryan Searle 6–4, while fellow Irishman Keane Barry beat twelfth seed Chris Dobey by the same scoreline. Krzysztof Ratajski defeated sixteenth seed Jermaine Wattimena 6–2 to advance to a match with Littler in the third round. Danny Noppert won 6–1 in an all-Dutch tie against Kevin Doets, while Cameron Menzies defeated eleventh seed Gary Anderson 6–3 in their all-Scottish contest.

=== Final day ===
World number one Luke Littler (pictured in 2026) won his sixth European Tour title.

The third round, quarter-finals, semi-finals and final were played on 6 September. The third round and quarter-finals were contested over the best of 11 legs, the semi-finals over the best of 13 legs, and the final over the best of 15 legs. The final day saw top seed Luke Littler and second seed Luke Humphries reach the final. Following a 6–3 win over Krzysztof Ratajski, Littler whitewashed Danny Noppert to progress to the semi-finals, where he averaged 106.64 to defeat Michael van Gerwen 7–3. Humphries continued his title defence with victories over Andrew Gilding, William O'Connor and Gerwyn Price. Competing in his fourth Czech Darts Open final in five years, Humphries looked to win the title for the third consecutive time, while his English World Cup teammate Littler aimed to win his maiden Czech title.

Littler won the first two legs of the final, but Humphries claimed the next three with checkouts of 110, 88 and 92 to take advantage. With Humphries 4–3 in front, Littler won the next four legs in a row, including a 130 checkout in the ninth, to lead 7–4. Humphries reduced the deficit to 7–6 and threatened to take the match to a deciding leg, but missed two darts at double 16, allowing the world number one to convert a 39 finish to win 8–6. Littler finished the match with five maximums (180s) and a three-dart average of 95.25.

Littler won his first Czech Darts Open title and his sixth European Tour title overall. He handed Humphries his first loss at the tournament since the 2023 edition. "It's good to be back and I'm back with a bang," declared Littler, making his first European Tour appearance since the Belgian Darts Open in March. On facing the world number two in the title decider, Littler said it was the final that the fans in Prague deserved. When questioned about participating in the remaining events on the 2026 European Tour, Littler expressed his uncertainty, commenting: "Yeah, we'll have to see what happens, see what the plan is, see how busy I am." Speaking in defeat, Humphries said that he "can't be upset" about missing out on a third straight title, noting that his missed darts at double 16 could have affected the match's outcome. He set out his aim to stop Littler from completing a clean sweep of major titles in 2026, saying: "I think he enjoys the challenge and I love it as well. Hopefully over the next four months, I push him and if he does the clean sweep he has to do it the hard way."

== Draw ==
The draw was announced on 3 September. Numbers to the left of a player's name show the seedings for the top 16 in the tournament. The figures to the right of a player's name state their three-dart average in a match. The reserve player is indicated by 'Alt'. Players in bold denote match winners.

**First round** (best of 11 legs); 4 September
**Niko Springer 102.48**	**6**
(Slovakia) Martin Homola 76.96	0
**Krzysztof Ratajski 92.74**	**6**
Adam Gawlas 88.24	2
**Luke Woodhouse 104.30**	**6**
Connor Scutt 97.40	4
**Kevin Doets 100.68**	**6**
Alt	Ricky Evans 90.99	2
Dirk van Duijvenbode 77.51	2
**Mario Vandenbogaerde 80.70**	**6**
**Martin Schindler 89.50**	**6**
Robert Owen 95.75	4
**Damon Heta 94.56**	**6**
Karel Sedláček 90.24	4
Rob Cross 86.12	4
**Keane Barry 89.73**	**6**
Daryl Gurney 89.54	4
**Beau Greaves 93.54**	**6**
**Andrew Gilding 90.66**	**6**
(Czech Republic) David Rosi 77.84	3
**Ryan Joyce 90.35**	**6**
Kim Huybrechts 91.91	5
**William O'Connor 82.55**	**6**
Jiří Brejcha 76.35	1
Niels Zonneveld 96.84	4
**Jeffrey de Graaf 94.21**	**6**
Joe Cullen 88.67	3
**Stephen Burton 91.12**	**6**
**Callan Rydz 96.14**	**6**
Cristo Reyes 86.88	1
**Cameron Menzies 92.49**	**6**
Johan Engström 83.85	1

**Second round** (best of 11 legs); 5 September
**1**	**Luke Littler 108.59**	**6**
Niko Springer 98.56	4
16	Jermaine Wattimena 95.41	2
**Krzysztof Ratajski 101.53**	**6**
8	Stephen Bunting 103.23	4
**Luke Woodhouse 105.30**	**6**
**9**	**Danny Noppert 101.34**	**6**
Kevin Doets 92.78	1
**4**	**Michael van Gerwen 92.50**	**6**
Mario Vandenbogaerde 86.81	4
**13**	**Wessel Nijman 97.47**	**6**
Martin Schindler 98.24	5
**5**	**Jonny Clayton 93.83**	**6**
Damon Heta 85.55	2
12	Chris Dobey 94.37	4
**Keane Barry 90.12**	**6**
**2**	**Luke Humphries 108.98**	**6**
Beau Greaves 98.85	2
15	Nathan Aspinall 95.71	2
**Andrew Gilding 96.49**	**6**
**7**	**Josh Rock 94.99**	**6**
Ryan Joyce 86.82	3
10	Ryan Searle 91.81	4
**William O'Connor 91.54**	**6**
**3**	**Gian van Veen 100.88**	**6**
Jeffrey de Graaf 96.59	1
**14**	**Ross Smith 97.70**	**6**
Stephen Burton 91.06	1
**6**	**Gerwyn Price 103.86**	**6**
Callan Rydz 80.86	2
11	Gary Anderson 84.63	3
**Cameron Menzies 95.82**	**6**

**Third round** (best of 11 legs); 6 September
**1**	**Littler 99.21**	**6**
Ratajski 99.61	3
Woodhouse 97.99	5
**9**	**Noppert 97.12**	**6**
**4**	**van Gerwen 102.02**	**6**
13	Nijman 98.98	4
**5**	**Clayton 96.94**	**6**
Barry 98.25	4
**2**	**Humphries 93.93**	**6**
Gilding 93.64	3
7	Rock 93.57	5
**O'Connor 93.43**	**6**
3	van Veen 90.19	3
**14**	**Smith 91.38**	**6**
**6**	**Price 89.39**	**6**
Menzies 76.18	1

**Quarter-finals** (best of 11 legs); 6 September
**1**	**Littler 102.48**	**6**
9	Noppert 88.78	0
**4**	**van Gerwen 97.79**	**6**
5	Clayton 88.84	3
**2**	**Humphries 91.54**	**6**
O'Connor 84.67	3
14	Smith 97.55	4
**6**	**Price 100.50**	**6**

**Semi-finals** (best of 13 legs); 6 September
**1**	**Littler 106.64**	**7**
4	van Gerwen 83.53	3
**2**	**Humphries 97.41**	**7**
6	Price 102.16	4

**Final** (best of 15 legs); 6 September
**1**	**Littler 95.25**	**8**
2	Humphries 94.81	6
