= 2026 Belgian Darts Open =

Darts tournament

2026 Lecot Belgian Darts Open

Tournament information
- Dates: 20–22 March 2026
- Venue: Oktoberhallen
- Location: Wieze, Belgium
- Organisation(s): Professional Darts Corporation (PDC)
- Format: Legs
- Prize fund: £230,000
- Winner's share: £35,000
- High checkout: 161; Luke Woodhouse; Mickey Mansell

Champion(s)
- Luke Humphries (ENG)

The 2026 Belgian Darts Open (known for sponsorship reasons as the 2026 Lecot Belgian Darts Open) was a professional darts tournament that took place at the Oktoberhallen in Wieze, Belgium, from 20 to 22 March 2026. It was the third of fifteen PDC European Tour events on the 2026 PDC Pro Tour. It featured a field of 48 players and £230,000 in prize money, with £35,000 going to the winner.

Luke Littler was the defending champion, having defeated Mike De Decker 8–5 in the 2025 final. However, he lost 6–5 to Niels Zonneveld in the third round, marking the end of Littler's 12-match unbeaten streak at the tournament.

Luke Humphries won the tournament, his ninth European Tour title, by defeating Jonny Clayton 8–6 in the final.

== Prize money ==
As part of a mass boost in prize money for Professional Darts Corporation (PDC) events in 2026, the prize fund for all 2026 European Tour events rose to £230,000, of which the winner receives £35,000.

Stage (num. of players)		Prize money
Winner	(1)	£35,000
Runner-up	(1)	£15,000
Semi-finalists	(2)	£10,000
Quarter-finalists	(4)	£8,000
Third round losers	(8)	£5,000
Second round losers	(16)	£3,500*
First round losers	(16)	£2,000*
Total	£230,000	

- Pre-qualified players from the Orders of Merit who lose in their first match of the event shall not be credited with prize money on any Order of Merit.

== Qualification and format ==
The top 16 players on the two-year PDC Order of Merit were seeded and entered the tournament in the second round, while the next 16 highest-ranked players from the one-year PDC Pro Tour Order of Merit automatically qualified for the first round. The seedings were confirmed on 12 February. The remaining 16 places went to players from four qualifying events – 10 from the Tour Card Holder Qualifier (held on 18 February), four from the Host Nation Qualifier (held on 19 March), one from the Nordic & Baltic Associate Member Qualifier (held on 7 February), and one from the East European Associate Member Qualifier (held on 25 January).

Gian van Veen, Gary Anderson and Gerwyn Price withdrew and were replaced by Ricky Evans, Mickey Mansell and Ian White. Damon Heta, Jermaine Wattimena and Mike De Decker moved up to become the 14th, 15th and 16th seeds respectively.

Seeded players

1. Luke Littler (ENG) (third round)
2. Luke Humphries (ENG) (champion)
3. Michael van Gerwen (NED) (semi-finals)
4. Jonny Clayton (WAL) (runner-up)
5. Stephen Bunting (ENG) (second round)
6. James Wade (ENG) (second round)
7. Josh Rock (NIR) (second round)
8. Danny Noppert (NED) (quarter-finals)
9. Ryan Searle (ENG) (third round)
10. Chris Dobey (ENG) (quarter-finals)
11. Nathan Aspinall (ENG) (second round)
12. Martin Schindler (GER) (third round)
13. Ross Smith (ENG) (third round)
14. Damon Heta (AUS) (second round)
15. Jermaine Wattimena (NED) (third round)
16. Mike De Decker (BEL) (second round)

PDC Pro Tour Order of Merit qualifiers

- Wessel Nijman (NED) (first round)
- Cameron Menzies (SCO) (second round)
- Dirk van Duijvenbode (NED) (second round)
- Luke Woodhouse (ENG) (second round)
- William O'Connor (IRL) (second round)
- Niko Springer (GER) (first round)
- Ryan Joyce (ENG) (quarter-finals)
- Krzysztof Ratajski (POL) (first round)
- Dave Chisnall (ENG) (second round)
- Joe Cullen (ENG) (first round)
- Niels Zonneveld (NED) (semi-finals)
- Daryl Gurney (NIR) (third round)
- Raymond van Barneveld (NED) (first round)

Tour Card qualifier
- Sebastian Białecki (POL) (second round)
- Sietse Lap (NED) (first round)
- Thibault Tricole (FRA) (first round)
- Tyler Thorpe (ENG) (first round)
- Michael Smith (ENG) (first round)
- Lukas Wenig (GER) (first round)
- Adam Gawlas (CZE) (first round)
- Scott Williams (ENG) (first round)
- Ryan Meikle (ENG) (second round)
- Cristo Reyes (ESP) (third round)
Host Nation qualifier
- Andy Baetens (BEL) (quarter-finals)
- Pascal Devroey (BEL) (first round)
- Kim Huybrechts (BEL) (third round)
- François Schweyen (BEL) (first round)
Nordic & Baltic qualifier
- Jani Haavisto (FIN) (first round)
East European qualifier
- Boris Krčmar (CRO) (second round)
Reserve list
- Ricky Evans (ENG) (second round)
- Mickey Mansell (IRL) (second round)
- Ian White (ENG) (first round)

== Summary ==
=== First round ===
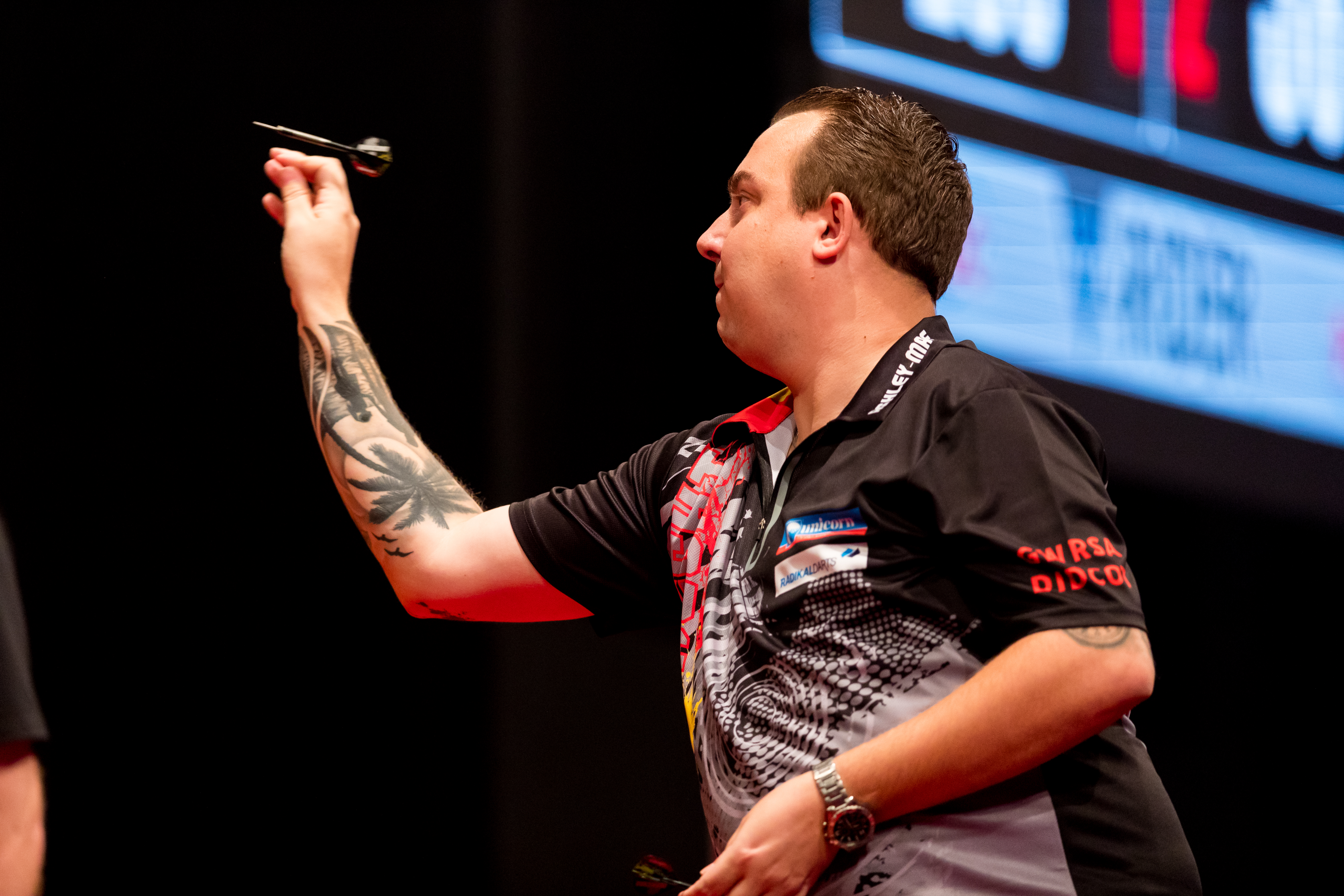
Belgian qualifiers Kim Huybrechts (pictured in 2019) and Andy Baetens were victorious in the first round. They reached the third round and the quarter-finals, respectively.

The first round (best of 11 legs) was played on 20 March. Belgium's Kim Huybrechts, a two-time European Tour winner, was victorious in his opening match, defeating Niko Springer 6–3 with a three-dart average of 101.76. "The feeling you get when you play in front of your home crowd and you win—this is amazing," said Huybrechts after the match. Five-time world champion Raymond van Barneveld was beaten 6–1 by Boris Krčmar, while 2023 world champion Michael Smith lost 6–3 to Mickey Mansell, who hit a 161 checkout. Belgium's Andy Baetens went to a deciding leg against Joe Cullen, where both players missed match darts before Baetens won the match on double 8. The other two host nation qualifiers were eliminated: Ryan Meikle came back from 4–1 behind to defeat François Schweyen 6–4, and Luke Woodhouse converted a 161 checkout on his way to winning 6–2 against European Tour debutant Pascal Devroey. Wessel Nijman, who won the European Darts Trophy the previous week, was beaten 6–3 by Sebastian Białecki.

Finland's Jani Haavisto returned to the European Tour for the first time in 11 years and 11 months, losing 6–4 to Niels Zonneveld. Cristo Reyes hit a 160 checkout to complete a 6–4 win over Krzysztof Ratajski. Eight-time European Tour winner Dave Chisnall won five consecutive legs to defeat Thibault Tricole 6–2. William O'Connor and Cameron Menzies earned 6–1 victories over European Tour debutants Tyler Thorpe and Sietse Lap, respectively. Daryl Gurney was also a 6–1 winner against Ian White.

=== Second round ===
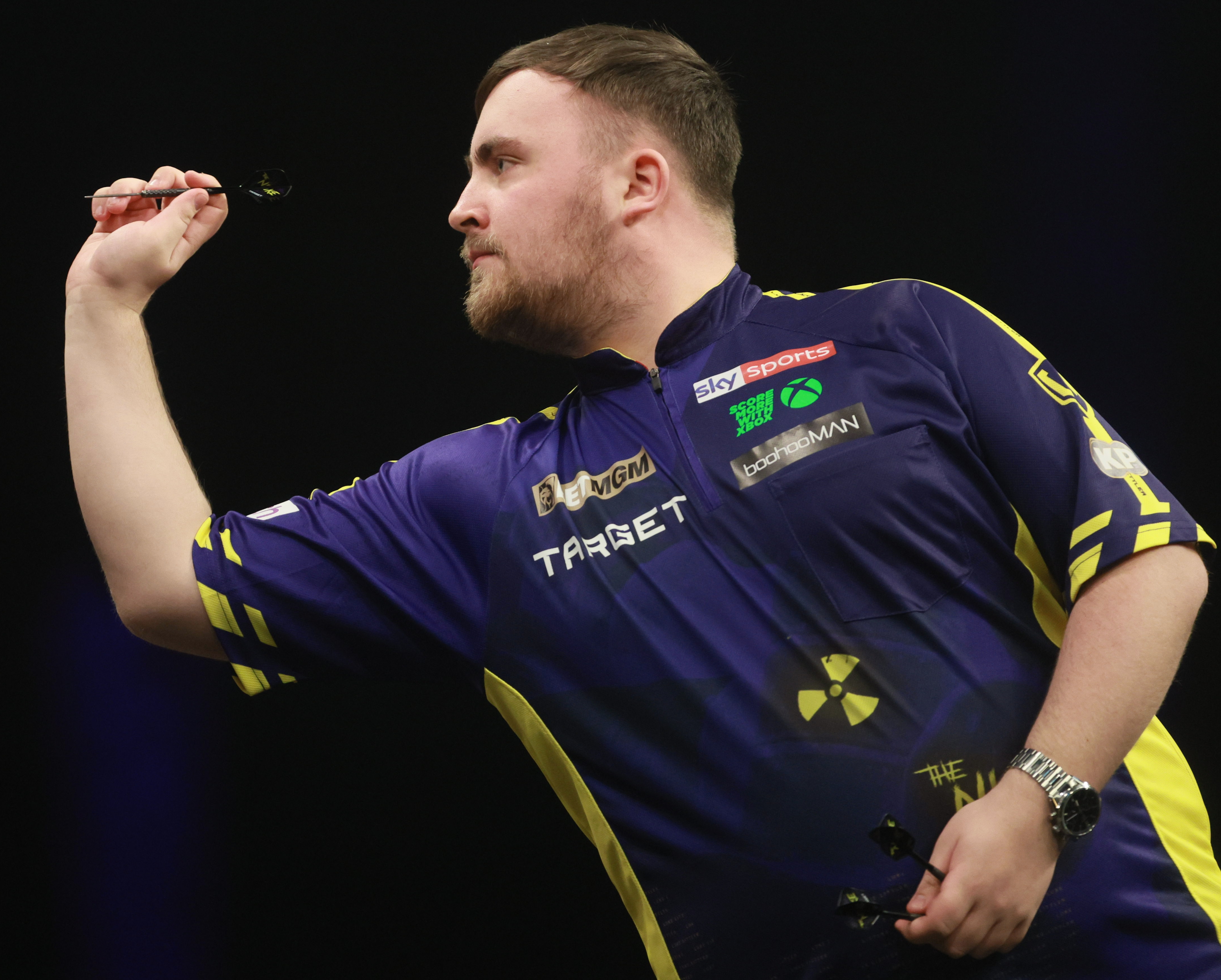
The defending champion Luke Littler (pictured in 2025) won his opening match, but was eliminated by Niels Zonneveld in the third round.

The second round (best of 11 legs) was played on 21 March. World champion Luke Littler won his opening match 6–2 against Boris Krčmar, averaging 104.70 in the process. "My first European Tour event was here. I want to win it again, and performances like that will put me up there," commented Littler afterwards. Belgian duo Kim Huybrechts and Andy Baetens progressed to the third round with respective 6–4 victories over Premier League players Josh Rock and Stephen Bunting; their compatriot Mike De Decker, the 16th seed, squandered a 5–3 lead and lost 6–5 to Niels Zonneveld, who set up a third-round meeting with Littler. Dirk van Duijvenbode attempted to overturn a 4–0 deficit against world number two Luke Humphries, missing darts to send the match to a deciding leg and allowing Humphries to take a 6–4 win. Third and fourth seeds Michael van Gerwen and Jonny Clayton were also victorious, securing wins over Mickey Mansell and Sebastian Białecki.

Sixth seed James Wade lost 6–2 to Cristo Reyes, eleventh seed Nathan Aspinall was beaten 6–3 by Ryan Joyce, and Daryl Gurney defeated fourteenth seed Damon Heta 6–3. Danny Noppert averaged 106.17 on his way to beating Luke Woodhouse 6–3. Ryan Searle converted a 122 checkout to win a deciding leg against Ricky Evans. Jermaine Wattimena, Chris Dobey, and Martin Schindler all advanced with 6–3 victories, while Ross Smith was a 6–4 victor over Cameron Menzies.

=== Final day ===
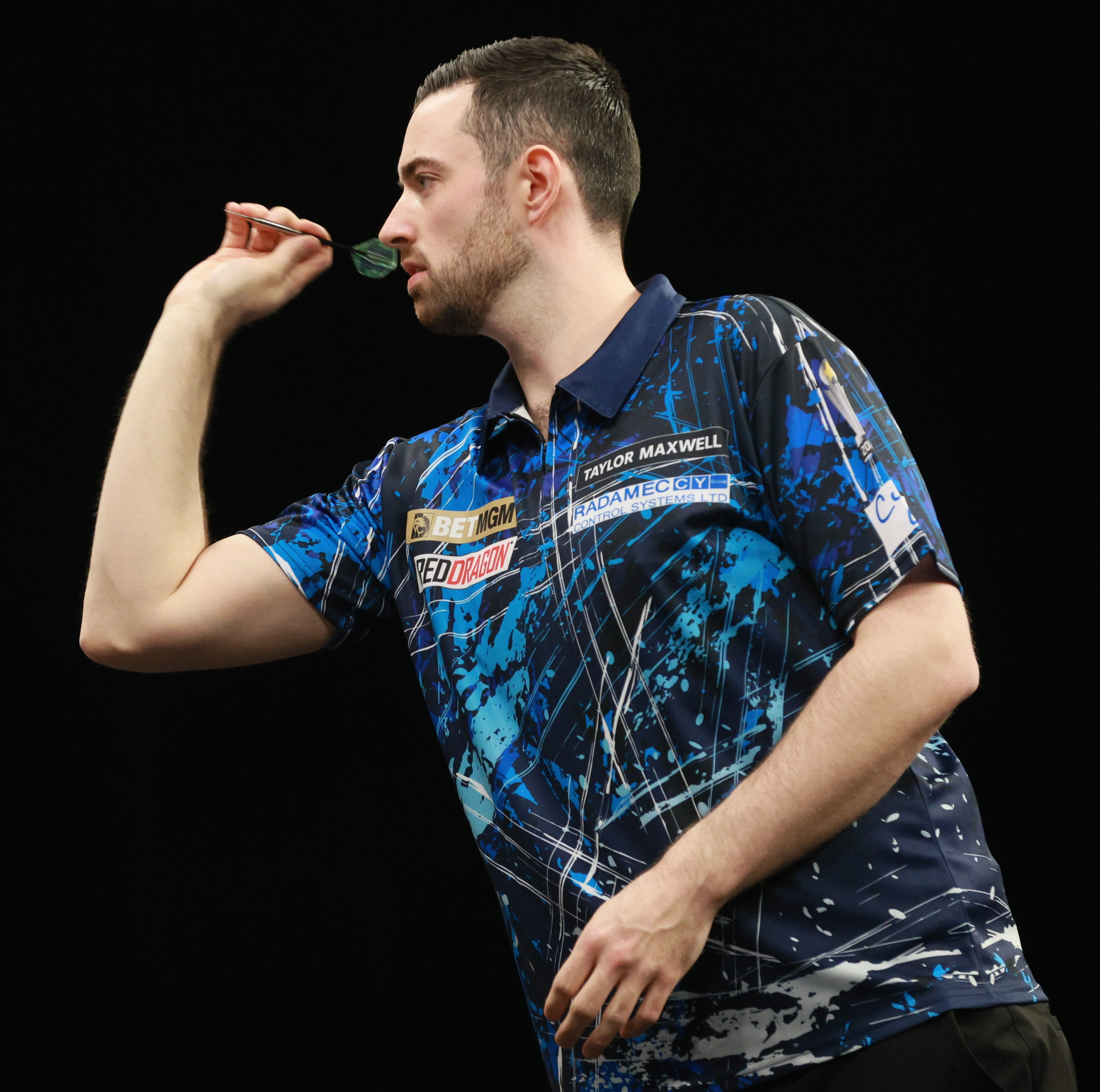
Luke Humphries (pictured in 2025) won his ninth European Tour title.

The third round, quarter-finals, semi-finals and final were played on 22 March. The third round and quarter-finals were contested over the best of 11 legs, the semi-finals over the best of 13 legs, and the final over the best of 15 legs. The final day saw Jonny Clayton and Luke Humphries reach the final. In the third round, where six of the eight matches went to a deciding leg, Luke Littler suffered a 6–5 loss to Niels Zonneveld, who won the decider with a 147 checkout. This marked Littler's first defeat in a ranking event since October 2025, and his first-ever defeat at the Belgian Darts Open after a streak of 12 matches unbeaten, including title wins in 2024 and 2025. "It's such a relief. I showed some really good nerve there. I'm so happy," commented Zonneveld after the win. Clayton followed a 6–5 victory over Ross Smith by beating first-time quarter-finalist Andy Baetens 6–1. In the semi-finals, Zonneveld missed four match darts to eliminate Clayton, who won 7–6 to advance to the final. Humphries secured his place in the final by defeating Jermaine Wattimena, Chris Dobey and Michael van Gerwen. Clayton and Humphries had contested the night six final of the 2026 Premier League earlier in the month, where Clayton won 6–1.

Clayton claimed the opening leg of the final, but the Welshman soon found himself behind as Humphries won the next six legs to lead 6–1, converting checkouts of 142 and 130 during his run. Clayton then staged a comeback, winning four of the next five legs, including a 126 checkout on the bullseye. He trailed 7–6, one leg away from a decider, but Humphries completed the next leg in 13 darts to secure an 8–6 victory. He finished the match with a three-dart average of 97.37.

Humphries won the tournament, his ninth European Tour title and first in Belgium. The victory extended his run of winning a European Tour title every year since 2022, and placed him in joint-second on the all-time list of European Tour winners alongside Gerwyn Price and Peter Wright, and behind Van Gerwen. Speaking after the match, Humphries said he "felt the nerves" when attempting to close out the match, saying: "I did [feel the nerves] in the end there because Jonny [Clayton] is one of the most underrated darts players in the world. He's always there and you can't shake him off." "I'm just dedicated and working so hard to push every darts player and be the best version of myself," added the world number two, before joking that he was going to "keep trying to be the second-best player in the world". Speaking in defeat, Clayton praised his opponent, calling Humphries "a great asset to darts". He remarked: "When you've got to face the likes of Luke [Humphries] week in, week out, it's difficult, but I'm still a part of it, so I'm proud of myself."

== Draw ==
The draw was announced on 19 March. Numbers to the left of a player's name show the seedings for the top 16 in the tournament. The figures to the right of a player's name state their three-dart average in a match. The three reserve players are indicated by 'Alt'. Players in bold denote match winners.

**First round** (best of 11 legs); 20 March
Raymond van Barneveld 89.48	1
**Boris Krčmar 101.21**	**6**
**Niels Zonneveld 101.01**	**6**
Jani Haavisto 91.83	4
**Luke Woodhouse 96.90**	**6**
Pascal Devroey 77.73	2
Scott Williams 83.48	2
**Alt**	**Ricky Evans 94.56**	**6**
Wessel Nijman 95.70	3
**Sebastian Białecki 99.78**	**6**
**Cameron Menzies 85.30**	**6**
Sietse Lap 78.53	1
Joe Cullen 101.40	5
**Andy Baetens 93.60**	**6**
**William O'Connor 95.97**	**6**
Tyler Thorpe 87.72	1
**Dirk van Duijvenbode 98.93**	**6**
Lukas Wenig 92.64	3
**Ryan Meikle 85.36**	**6**
François Schweyen 89.83	4
Niko Springer 99.85	3
**Kim Huybrechts 101.76**	**6**
**Dave Chisnall 94.59**	**6**
Thibault Tricole 85.63	2
Michael Smith 98.21	3
**Alt**	**Mickey Mansell 94.95**	**6**
**Daryl Gurney 97.88**	**6**
Alt	Ian White 86.22	1
Krzysztof Ratajski 98.01	4
**Cristo Reyes 102.13**	**6**
**Ryan Joyce 87.84**	**6**
Adam Gawlas 86.68	4

**Second round** (best of 11 legs); 21 March
**1**	**Luke Littler 104.70**	**6**
Boris Krčmar 94.67	2
16	Mike De Decker 91.55	5
**Niels Zonneveld 92.00**	**6**
**8**	**Danny Noppert 106.17**	**6**
Luke Woodhouse 102.66	3
**9**	**Ryan Searle 91.61**	**6**
Alt	Ricky Evans 97.21	5
**4**	**Jonny Clayton 98.19**	**6**
Sebastian Białecki 93.78	3
**13**	**Ross Smith 92.89**	**6**
Cameron Menzies 83.43	4
5	Stephen Bunting 85.28	4
**Andy Baetens 89.89**	**6**
**12**	**Martin Schindler 94.79**	**6**
William O'Connor 95.17	3
**2**	**Luke Humphries 100.25**	**6**
Dirk van Duijvenbode 94.32	4
**15**	**Jermaine Wattimena 94.64**	**6**
Ryan Meikle 88.06	3
7	Josh Rock 91.85	4
**Kim Huybrechts 87.32**	**6**
**10**	**Chris Dobey 91.03**	**6**
Dave Chisnall 84.22	3
**3**	**Michael van Gerwen 99.29**	**6**
Alt	Mickey Mansell 95.37	4
14	Damon Heta 80.91	3
**Daryl Gurney 98.40**	**6**
6	James Wade 89.70	2
**Cristo Reyes 95.93**	**6**
11	Nathan Aspinall 89.43	3
**Ryan Joyce 93.24**	**6**

**Third round** (best of 11 legs); 22 March
1	Littler 103.20	5
**Zonneveld 101.58**	**6**
**8**	**Noppert 97.94**	**6**
9	Searle 101.90	5
**4**	**Clayton 95.19**	**6**
13	R Smith 93.61	5
**Baetens 98.06**	**6**
12	Schindler 92.71	5
**2**	**Humphries 102.91**	**6**
15	Wattimena 91.45	1
Huybrechts 93.49	3
**10**	**Dobey 97.29**	**6**
**3**	**van Gerwen 108.65**	**6**
Gurney 109.73	5
Reyes 93.35	5
**Joyce 93.44**	**6**

**Quarter-finals** (best of 11 legs); 22 March
**Zonneveld 95.64**	**6**
8	Noppert 84.72	3
**4**	**Clayton 99.29**	**6**
Baetens 87.60	1
**2**	**Humphries 95.56**	**6**
10	Dobey 90.72	5
**3**	**van Gerwen 99.57**	**6**
Joyce 90.93	4

**Semi-finals** (best of 13 legs); 22 March
Zonneveld 88.02	6
**4**	**Clayton 89.06**	**7**
**2**	**Humphries 105.96**	**7**
3	van Gerwen 93.38	2

**Final** (best of 15 legs); 22 March
4	Clayton 94.16	6
**2**	**Humphries 97.37**	**8**
