= Josh Rock =

Northern Irish darts player (born 2001)

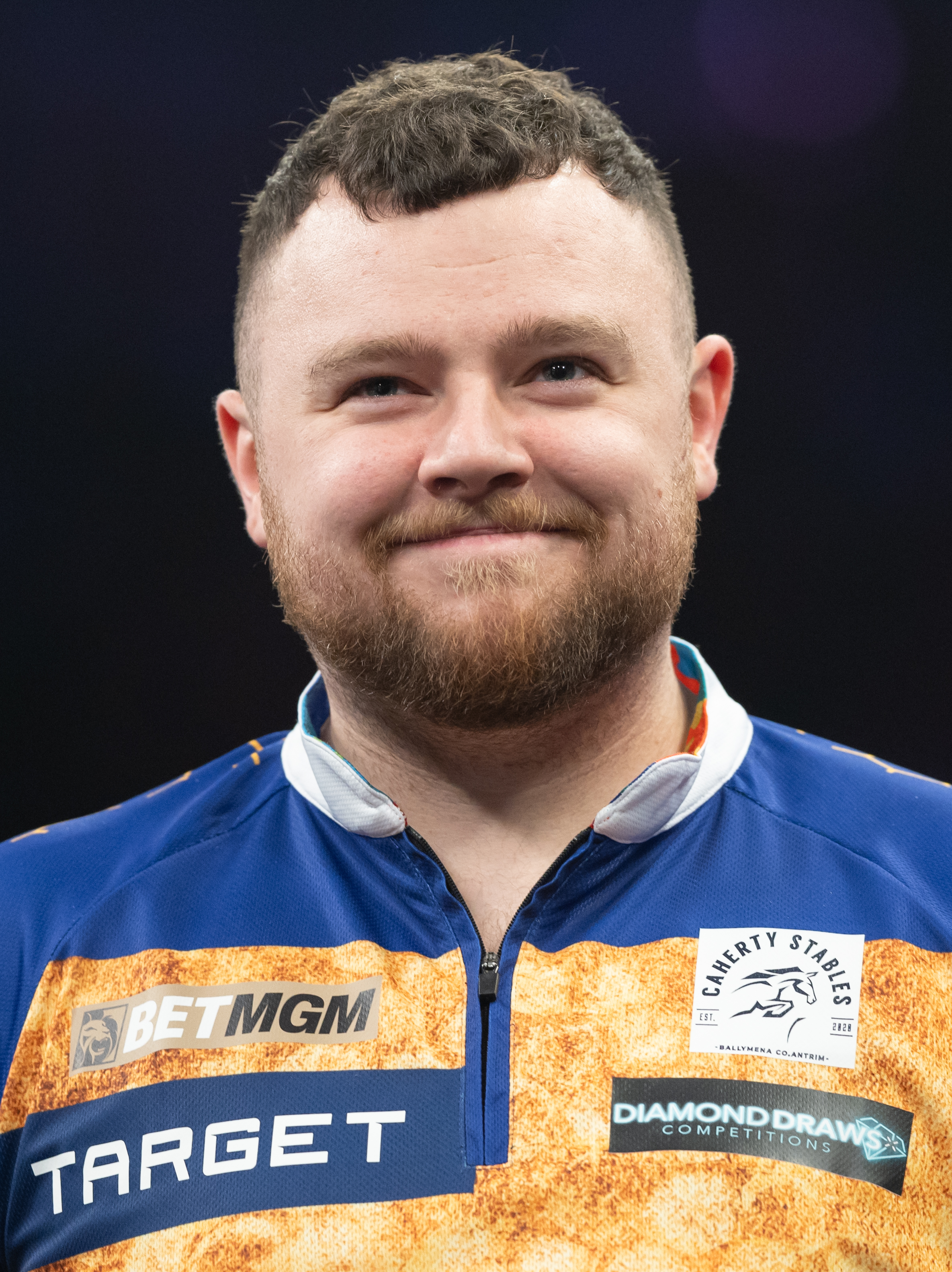
- Rock in 2026

Personal information
- Full name: Joshua Rock
- Nickname: "Rocky"
- Born: 13 April 2001 (age 25) Antrim, Country Antrim, Northern Ireland
- Home town: Broughshane, County Antrim, Northern Ireland

Sport
- Sport: Darts
- Playing since: 2016
- Darts: 24g Target Signature Gen 1
- Laterality: Right-handed
- Walk-on music: "Welcome to the Party" by DJ Krissy

Organisation (see split in darts)
- PDC: 2022–present (Tour Card: 2022–present)
- WDF: 2021
- Current world ranking: (PDC) 12 ▼4 (22 November 2026)

PDC premier events – best performances
- World Championship: Last 16: 2023, 2026
- World Matchplay: Semi-final: 2025
- World Grand Prix: Last 16: 2025
- UK Open: Semi-final: 2025, 2026
- Grand Slam: Quarter-final: 2023, 2025
- European Championship: Last 16: 2022, 2026
- Premier League: 8th: 2026
- PC Finals: Quarter-final: 2025
- Masters: Quarter-final: 2026
- World Series Finals: Semi-final: 2025

Other tournament wins
- Years
PDC World Cup of Darts (Team event)	2025
See Titles

Other achievements
- 2022 Young Player of the Year; 2022 Best Newcomer

Joshua Rock (born 13 April 2001) is a Northern Irish professional darts player who competes in Professional Darts Corporation (PDC) events, where he is ranked world number twelve; he reached a peak of world number seven earlier in 2026. Nicknamed "Rocky", he won the PDC World Cup of Darts in 2025, representing Northern Ireland alongside Daryl Gurney. Rock has also won six PDC ranking titles, including two titles on the European Tour.

In his youth career, Rock found success in the PDC's youth system, most notably winning the PDC World Youth Championship in 2022. He also won five titles on the 2022 PDC Development Tour. He threw his first televised nine-dart finish at the 2022 Grand Slam of Darts in his match against Michael van Gerwen. In 2025, Rock reached the semi-finals of the UK Open, World Matchplay, and the World Series Finals.

== Early life ==
Rock was born on 13 April 2001 in Antrim, County Antrim, Northern Ireland. He played for his local football club, Antrim Rovers, as a right-back. He later moved to the village of Broughshane. He started playing darts competitively in pub leagues at the age of 10 or 11 and began pursuing a career in the sport once he left school at age 16.

== Career ==
=== 2022 ===
In January 2022, Rock attended PDC Pro Tour Qualifying School. He won a PDC Tour Card by defeating Nathan Rafferty in the Final Stage Day Four final.

He topped the Development Tour Order of Merit, winning five events. In November, Rock achieved his first televised nine-dart finish in the last 16 of the 2022 Grand Slam of Darts, in an eventual 10–8 defeat to Michael van Gerwen. Later that month, Rock won the PDC World Youth Championship by beating Nathan Girvan 6–1 with an average of 104.13, a record for a World Youth final.

=== 2023 ===
In his debut at the 2023 World Championship, Rock beat José Justicia, Callan Rydz and Nathan Aspinall before losing 4–3 to Jonny Clayton in the fourth round.

On the 2023 PDC Pro Tour, Rock reached the final of four Players Championship events and the Austrian Darts Open.

At the 2023 Grand Slam of Darts, Rock won Group B with wins against Chris Dobey, Jonny Clayton and Berry van Peer and reached the quarter finals with a 10–5 win over Krzysztof Ratajski. Rock lost in his quarter-final match 16–15 to James Wade.

=== 2024 ===
At the 2024 World Championship, Rock suffered a shock 3–1 second-round defeat to Berry van Peer. On the 2024 PDC Pro Tour, Rock reached the final of Players Championship 7, but lost to Chris Dobey 8–4. However, in May, Rock won his first PDC European Tour title; he beat Jonny Clayton 8–4 in the final of the Dutch Darts Championship. Rock added two more Players Championship titles at events 17 and 30.

Rock represented Northern Ireland in the PDC World Cup of Darts for the first time at the 2024 edition, serving as team captain and partnering Brendan Dolan. They reached the quarter-finals of the tournament, where they were defeated 8–4 by eventual champions England.

=== 2025 ===
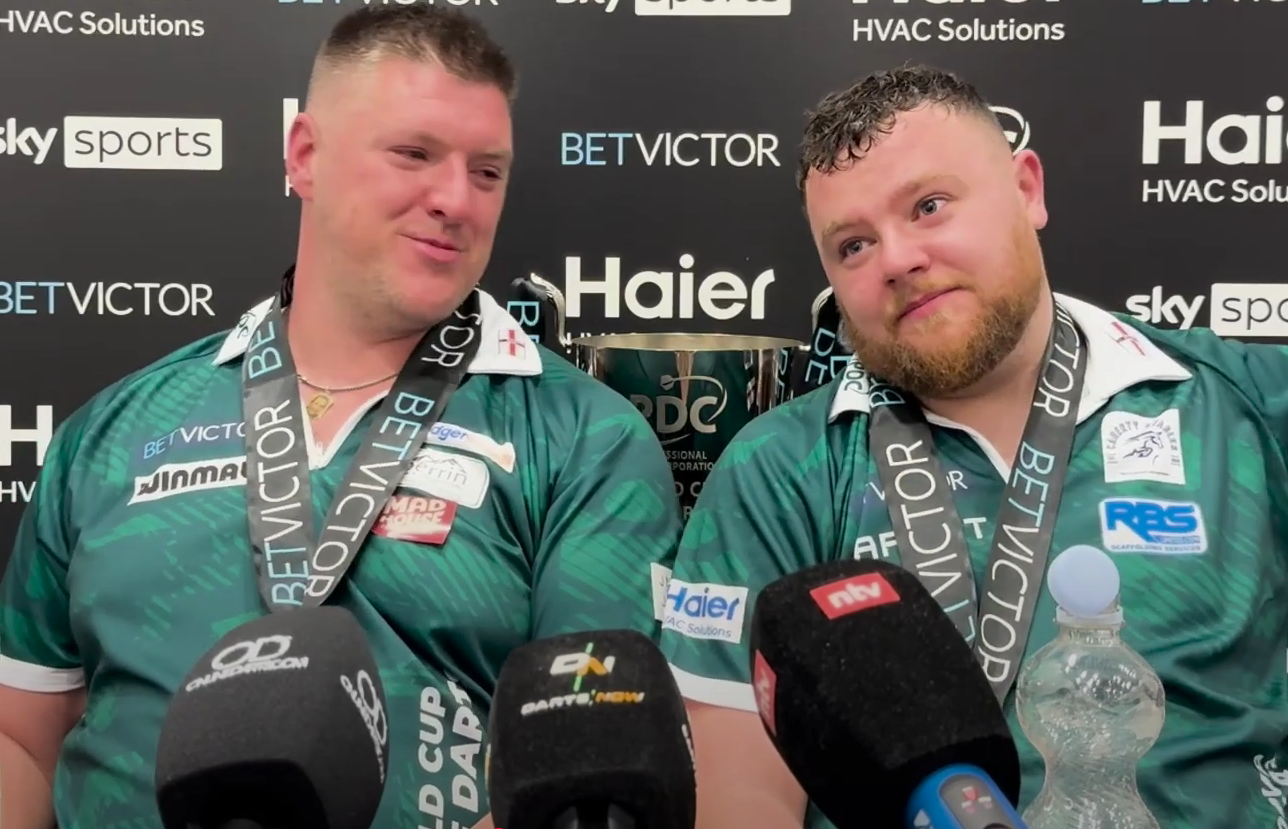
Rock (right) and his Northern Ireland teammate Daryl Gurney after their win at the 2025 PDC World Cup of Darts

At the 2025 World Championship, Rock reached the third round where he was eliminated in a 4–2 defeat to Chris Dobey. Following the tournament, he signed a deal with darts manufacturer Target Darts and claimed that he and new Target stablemate Luke Littler could "dominate the sport for years to come." At the UK Open, Rock reached his first PDC major semi-final after a 10–7 victory over Nathan Aspinall in the quarter-finals, but lost 11–2 to James Wade. He won his first title of the year – his fifth Pro Tour title – at Players Championship 10, defeating Cameron Menzies 8–4 in the final.

Rock and teammate Daryl Gurney won the World Cup of Darts for Northern Ireland for the first time, defeating Jonny Clayton and Gerwyn Price of Wales 10–9 in a deciding leg. He broke the record for most maximums (180s) hit in a World Cup final with nine.

Rock reached the semi-finals of the 2025 World Matchplay and the final of the 2025 Flanders Darts Trophy, losing to eventual champion Luke Littler on both occasions. He made it back-to-back European Tour finals at the Czech Darts Open, where he lost 8–5 to Luke Humphries. After making the semi-finals at the 2025 Hungarian Darts Trophy, Rock entered the top ten of the PDC Order of Merit for the first time.

=== 2026 ===
At the 2026 World Championship, Rock reached the fourth round of the tournament following wins over Gemma Hayter, Joe Comito and Callan Rydz. He exited the tournament after losing 4–0 to Justin Hood. On 5 January 2026, Rock was selected to compete in the Premier League for the first time in his career.

Rock reached his second straight UK Open semi-final, where he was beaten 11–9 by eventual champion Luke Littler. On 26 February 2026, during the fourth night of the Premier League in Belfast, Rock hit a nine-dart finish in his 6–2 defeat to Gian van Veen. He finished his first Premier League campaign in last place with eight points. At the Austrian Darts Open in May, he won his second European Tour title by defeating Kevin Doets 8–6 in the final.

== Personal life ==
In September 2024, Rock and his partner Sarah had a daughter. The couple married in January 2025, two days before Rock competed at the 2025 PDC World Masters. He is a supporter of Scottish football club Rangers, English club Manchester United, and local side Ballymena United; he was primary and secondary schoolmates with Northern Irish footballer Ross McCausland. Rock became an ambassador for Sensory Kids NI, a children's autism charity in Northern Ireland, after his stepson was diagnosed with autism.

== World Championship results ==
=== PDC World Championship ===
- 2023: Fourth round (lost to Jonny Clayton 3–4)
- 2024: Second round (lost to Berry van Peer 1–3)
- 2025: Third round (lost to Chris Dobey 2–4)
- 2026: Fourth round (lost to Justin Hood 0–4)

== Career finals ==
=== PDC team finals: 1 (1 title) ===
Outcome	No.	Year	Championship	Team	Teammate	Opponents in the final	Score (Note: (l) = score in legs, (s) = score in sets, (m) = score in matches.)
Winner	1.	2025	World Cup of Darts	Northern Ireland	Daryl Gurney	Wales – Gerwyn Price and Jonny Clayton	10–9 (l)

== Performance timeline ==
=== PDC ===
Tournament	2022	2023	2024	2025	2026
PDC Ranked televised events
World Championship	DNQ	4R	2R	3R	4R
World Masters (Note: A non ranked event until 2025)	DNQ		1R	2R	QF
UK Open	1R	3R	5R	SF	SF
World Matchplay	DNQ	1R	1R	SF	QF
World Grand Prix	DNQ	1R	1R	2R	1R
European Championship	2R	1R	1R	1R	2R
Grand Slam	2R	QF	RR	QF	RR
Players Championship Finals	1R	2R	2R	QF	DNQ
PDC Non-ranked televised events
Premier League	Did not participate				8th
World Cup	DNQ		QF	W	SF
World Series Finals	DNQ			SF	QF
World Youth Championship	W	QF	DNP		
Career statistics
Season-end ranking (PDC)	36	21	16	9	

=== Premier League ===
Season	1	2	3	4	5	6	7	8	9	10	11	12	13	14	15	16	F
2026	NEW; QF	ANT; QF	GLA; QF	BEL; QF	CAR; QF	NOT; QF	DUB; QF	BER; SF	MAN; SF	BRI; SF	ROT; SF	LIV; QF	ABD; QF	LEE; QF	BIR; QF	SHF; QF	LON; DNQ

==== European Tour ====
Season	1	2	3	4	5	6	7	8	9	10	11	12	13	14	15
2022	DNQ			ADO; 2R	EDO; QF	CDO; 1R	DNQ			HDT; QF	GDO; 1R	BDO; DNQ	GDT; QF		
2023	BSD; DNQ	EDO; QF	IDO; 3R	GDG; 2R	ADO; F	DDC; 3R	BDO; SF	CDO; 3R	EDG; 3R	EDM; 3R	GDO; SF	HDT; 2R	GDC; 2R		
2024	BDO; 2R	GDG; QF	IDO; 3R	EDG; QF	ADO; 3R	BSD; 2R	DDC; W	EDO; 3R	GDC; WD	FDT; 3R	HDT; QF	SDT; SF	CDO; 2R		
2025	BDO; 1R	EDT; 2R	IDO; QF	GDG; SF	ADO; SF	EDG; 2R	DDC; 2R	EDO; DNP	BSD; 3R	FDT; F	CDO; F	HDT; SF	SDT; 2R	GDC; 2R	
2026	BDO; QF	EDT; QF	BDO; 2R	GDG; 3R	EDG; 3R	ADO; W	IDO; 2R	BSD; WD	SDO; DNP	EDO; DNP	HDT; 3R	CDO; 3R	FDT; 2R	SDT; 3R	DDC; DNP

==== Players Championships ====
Season	1	2	3	4	5	6	7	8	9	10	11	12	13	14	15	16	17	18	19	20	21	22	23	24	25	26	27	28	29	30	31	32	33	34
2022	BAR; 1R	BAR; 1R	WIG; 1R	WIG; 1R	BAR; 2R	BAR; QF	NIE; DNP		BAR; 2R	BAR; 2R	BAR; QF	BAR; 1R	BAR; 3R	WIG; 1R	WIG; QF	NIE; SF	NIE; 3R	BAR; 1R	BAR; 1R	BAR; 2R	BAR; 2R	BAR; 4R	BAR; 1R	BAR; 2R	BAR; F	BAR; 4R	BAR; 4R	BAR; W	BAR; 3R	BAR; QF				
2023	BAR; 3R	BAR; 2R	BAR; QF	BAR; 4R	BAR; 3R	BAR; 3R	HIL; F	HIL; 1R	WIG; QF	WIG; QF	LEI; 3R	LEI; F	HIL; 3R	HIL; 2R	LEI; 4R	LEI; 1R	HIL; F	HIL; 1R	BAR; 1R	BAR; 4R	BAR; 3R	BAR; 1R	BAR; 2R	BAR; 1R	BAR; F	BAR; 3R	BAR; 4R	BAR; 4R	BAR; 2R	BAR; 3R				
2024	WIG; 1R	WIG; 3R	LEI; 3R	LEI; 1R	HIL; 1R	HIL; 1R	LEI; F	LEI; 4R	HIL; 1R	HIL; 2R	HIL; 2R	HIL; 3R	MIL; 1R	MIL; QF	MIL; 1R	MIL; 4R	MIL; W	MIL; 1R	MIL; 2R	Did not participate				WIG; 1R	WIG; 1R	WIG; 4R	WIG; 3R	WIG; F	LEI; 3R	LEI; W				
2025	WIG; 2R	WIG; 1R	ROS; 2R	ROS; QF	LEI; 2R	LEI; 1R	HIL; 1R	HIL; 3R	LEI; QF	LEI; W	LEI; QF	LEI; F	ROS; 4R	ROS; 2R	HIL; DNP		LEI; 4R	LEI; 3R	LEI; DNP	LEI; QF	LEI; QF	Did not participate						LEI; 1R	LEI; F	LEI; 1R	WIG; 2R	WIG; 1R	WIG; DNP	
2026	HIL; DNP		WIG; 2R	WIG; 3R	LEI; 1R	LEI; DNP			WIG; 2R	WIG; 4R	MIL; 1R	MIL; 2R	HIL; DNP		LEI; QF	LEI; 1R	LEI; 1R	LEI; 3R	MIL; 3R	MIL; 2R	WIG; DNP		LEI; 4R	LEI; 3R	Did not participate				ROS; 4R	ROS; 1R	ROS; DNP		LEI; 1R	LEI; 2R

==== World Series ====
Tournament	2025	2026
Australian Masters	QF	QF
New Zealand Masters	QF	QF
US Masters	DNP	1R

Performance Table Legend
W	Won the tournament	F	Finalist	SF	Semifinalist	QF	Quarterfinalist	#R; RR; L#	Lost in # round Round-robin; Last # stage	DQ	Disqualified
DNQ	Did not qualify	DNP	Did not participate	WD	Withdrew	NH	Tournament not held	#R; RR; L#	Lost in # round Round-robin; Last # stage	NYF	Not yet founded

== Titles ==
=== PDC ===
- PDC World Cup of Darts (1)
  - 2025
- PDC Pro Tour (6)
  - PDC European Tour (2)
    - 2024 (×1): Dutch Darts Championship
    - 2026 (×1): Austrian Darts Open
  - PDC Players Championships (4)
    - 2022 (×1): 18
    - 2024 (×2): 17, 30
    - 2025 (×1): 10

==== Youth events ====
- PDC Development Tour (5)
  - 2022 (×5): 3, 5, 16, 17, 21
- PDC World Youth Championship (1)
  - 2022

== Nine-dart finishes ==
Josh Rock televised nine-dart finishes
Date	Opponent	Tournament	Method
17 November 2022	(Netherlands) Michael van Gerwen	2022 Grand Slam of Darts	3 x T20; 3 x T20; T20, T19, D12
27 February 2026	(Netherlands) Gian van Veen	2026 Premier League Darts	3 x T20; 3 x T20; T20, T19, D12
