= 2023 Czech Darts Open =

2023 Gambrinus Czech Darts Open

Tournament information
- Dates: 12–14 May 2023
- Venue: PVA Expo Praha
- Location: Prague, Czech Republic
- Organisation(s): Professional Darts Corporation (PDC)
- Format: Legs
- Prize fund: £175,000
- Winner's share: £30,000
- High checkout: 170; Matt Campbell; Karel Sedláček; Kim Huybrechts

Champion(s)
- Peter Wright

The 2023 Czech Darts Open, known as the 2023 Gambrinus Czech Darts Open for sponsorship reasons, was a professional darts tournament that took place at the PVA Expo Praha in Prague, Belgium from 12–14 May 2023. It was the eighth of thirteen European Tour events on the 2023 PDC Pro Tour. It featured a field of 48 players and £175,000 in prize money, with £30,000 going to the winner.

Luke Humphries was the defending champion, defeating Rob Cross 8–5 in the 2022 final, but he was defeated 6–3 by Peter Wright in the quarter-finals.

Peter Wright went on to win his eighth European Tour title by defeating Dave Chisnall 8–6 in the final.

== Prize money ==
The prize money was increased for the first time in 4 years for all European Tours:

Stage (num. of players)		Prize money
Winner	(1)	£30,000
Runner-up	(1)	£12,000
Semi-finalists	(2)	£8,500
Quarter-finalists	(4)	£6,000
Third round losers	(8)	£4,000
Second round losers	(16)	£2,500*
First round losers	(16)	£1,250
Total	£175,000	

- Seeded players who lost in the second round of the event were not credited with prize money on any Order of Merit. A player who qualified as a qualifier, but later became a seed due to the withdrawal of one or more other players was credited with their prize money on all Orders of Merit regardless of how far they progressed in the event.

== Qualification and format ==
The top 16 entrants from the PDC Pro Tour Order of Merit on 9 March 2023 automatically qualified for the event and were seeded into the second round.

The remaining 32 places went to players from six qualifying events – 24 from the Tour Card Holder Qualifier (held on 21 March), two from the Associate Member Qualifier, the two highest ranked Belgians automatically qualified, alongside two from the Host Nation Qualifier, one from the Nordic & Baltic Associate Member Qualifier, and one from the East European Associate Member Qualifier.

On 11 May, it was announced that the 7 seed Michael Smith and qualifier Gary Anderson had withdrawn for personal reasons. Dimitri Van den Bergh was elevated to 16 seed, and Rowby-John Rodriguez and Callan Rydz were included as Reserve List Qualifiers.

The following players took part in the tournament:

Top 16

1. Luke Humphries (quarter-finals)
2. Dave Chisnall (runner-up)
3. Michael van Gerwen (quarter-finals)
4. Damon Heta (semi-finals)
5. Dirk van Duijvenbode (third round)
6. Rob Cross (semi-finals)
7. Nathan Aspinall (quarter-finals)
8. Danny Noppert (third round)
9. Peter Wright (champion)
10. Ryan Searle (third round)
11. Joe Cullen (second round)
12. Jonny Clayton (quarter-finals)
13. Martin Schindler (second round)
14. Josh Rock (third round)
15. Andrew Gilding (third round)
16. Dimitri Van den Bergh (third round)

Tour Card Qualifier
- Darius Labanauskas (first round)
- Kim Huybrechts (third round)
- José de Sousa (second round)
- Martin Lukeman (second round)
- Steve Beaton (second round)
- Stephen Bunting (first round)
- Martijn Kleermaker (second round)
- Bradley Brooks (first round)
- Dylan Slevin (second round)
- Ross Smith (second round)
- Matt Campbell (first round)
- Madars Razma (second round)
- Brendan Dolan (second round)
- Ian White (first round)
- Mario Vandenbogaerde (second round)
- Jamie Hughes (first round)
- Richard Veenstra (first round)
- Mike De Decker (second round)
- Geert Nentjes (second round)
- Vincent van der Voort (second round)
- Jeffrey Sparidaans (first round)
- Karel Sedláček (third round)

Associate Member Qualifier
- Jelle Klaasen (first round)
- Stefan Bellmont (second round)

Highest Ranking Czechs
- Adam Gawlas (first round)
- Filip Šebesta (first round)

Host Nation Qualifier
- Dalibor Šmolík (second round)
- David Pisek (first round)

Nordic & Baltic Qualifier
- Jani Laurila (first round)

East European Qualifier
- Patrik Kovács (first round)

Reserve List Qualifier
- Rowby-John Rodriguez (first round)
- Callan Rydz (first round)

== Draw ==
The draw was confirmed on 11 May.

First round (best of 11 legs); 21 April
Ross Smith 99.32	6
Jani Laurila 87.95	3
Stefan Bellmont 88.12	6
Alt	Rowby-John Rodriguez 82.63	4
José de Sousa 98.15	6
Bradley Brooks 92.01	4
Jelle Klaasen 96.36	4
Brendan Dolan 93.47	6
Dylan Slevin 88.63	6
Filip Šebesta 83.50	3
Kim Huybrechts 95.97	6
Alt	Callan Rydz 75.24	1
Mario Vandenbogaerde 96.99	6
Matt Campbell 97.69	5
Martijn Kleermaker 95.67	6
Stephen Bunting 95.12	3
Geert Nentjes 83.19	6
David Pisek 82.06	5
Jamie Hughes 88.84	1
Vincent van der Voort 93.22	6
Martin Lukeman 85.89	6
Patrik Kovács 85.14	2
Steve Beaton 94.92	6
Darius Labanauskas 90.60	4
Ian White 91.26	4
Mike De Decker 96.30	6
Richard Veenstra 84.69	4
Dalibor Šmolík 91.22	6
Adam Gawlas 87.43	3
Madars Razma 95.25	6
Karel Sedláček 86.74	6
Jeffrey Sparidaans 83.92	5

Second round (best of 11 legs); 22 April
1	Luke Humphries 93.87	6
Ross Smith 88.63	4
16	Dimitri Van den Bergh 102.40	6
Stefan Bellmont 88.97	2
8	Danny Noppert 101.51	6
José de Sousa 98.93	4
9	Peter Wright 90.67	6
Brendan Dolan 88.63	5
4	Damon Heta 92.98	6
Dylan Slevin 88.62	2
13	Martin Schindler 94.29	3
Kim Huybrechts 100.29	6
5	Dirk van Duijvenbode 94.87	6
Mario Vandenbogaerde 94.67	5
12	Jonny Clayton 86.68	6
Martijn Kleermaker 80.82	1
2	Dave Chisnall 100.56	6
Geert Nentjes 88.30	2
15	Andrew Gilding 91.38	6
Vincent van der Voort 83.02	2
7	Nathan Aspinall 103.65	6
Martin Lukeman 94.87	4
10	Ryan Searle 92.17	6
Steve Beaton 88.11	4
3	Michael van Gerwen 99.52	6
Mike De Decker 94.26	4
14	Josh Rock 97.27	6
Dalibor Šmolík 89.11	3
6	Rob Cross 99.57	6
Madars Razma 88.78	3
11	Joe Cullen 103.53	4
Karel Sedláček 97.42	6

Third round (best of 11 legs); 23 April
1	Humphries 97.77	6
16	Van den Bergh 82.40	1
8	Noppert 97.25	3
9	Wright 101.81	6
4	Heta 90.46	6
Huybrechts 95.26	5
5	van Duijvenbode 95.28	3
12	Clayton 101.07	6
2	Chisnall 99.25	6
15	Gilding 97.59	4
7	Aspinall 105.85	6
10	Searle 86.61	1
3	van Gerwen 102.91	6
14	Rock 103.31	5
6	Cross 96.41	6
Sedláček 98.31	3

Quarter-finals (best of 11 legs); 23 April
1	Humphries 93.93	3
9	Wright 97.80	6
4	Heta 92.91	6
12	Clayton 94.99	5
2	Chisnall 101.52	6
7	Aspinall 98.96	5
3	van Gerwen 91.28	4
6	Cross 94.91	6

Semi-finals (best of 13 legs); 23 April
9	Wright 104.01	7
4	Heta 101.77	5
2	Chisnall 98.43	7
6	Cross 93.55	4

Final (best of 15 legs); 23 April
9	Wright 95.68	8
2	Chisnall 97.40	6
