= 2026 Premier League Darts =

Darts competition

2026 BetMGM Premier League Darts

Tournament information
- Dates: 5 February – 28 May 2026
- Nine-dart finish: Josh Rock

Champion(s)
- Luke Littler (ENG)

2026 Premier League Darts (known for sponsorship reasons as the 2026 BetMGM Premier League) was a professional darts tournament organised by the Professional Darts Corporation (PDC). The 22nd edition of Premier League Darts, the event began on 5 February 2026 at the Newcastle Arena in Newcastle upon Tyne and ended with the play-offs at the O2 Arena in London on 28 May 2026. The total prize fund was £1,250,000, with the overall winner receiving £350,000 and each weekly winner receiving a £10,000 bonus.

The eight-player tournament began with a 16-week league stage. Following the league stage, the top four players competed in the play-offs. The 2026 edition marked the introduction of Belgium to the schedule, with a night in Antwerp being included for the first time. Gian van Veen and Josh Rock made their Premier League debuts. Rock hit a nine-dart finish during his 6–2 loss to Van Veen on night four.

Luke Humphries entered the tournament as the defending champion, having defeated Luke Littler 11–8 in the 2025 final. Littler equalled his own record of six nightly wins during the league stage, which he set the previous year. The pair contested the final for a third consecutive year, where Littler defeated Humphries 11–10 to win his second Premier League title.

== Overview ==
=== Background ===
2026 Premier League Darts was the 22nd edition of the tournament to be staged by the Professional Darts Corporation (PDC) since the inaugural event in 2005. The inaugural event was played in venues across the United Kingdom and was won by Phil Taylor, who defeated Colin Lloyd 16–4 in the final. Taylor won six of the first eight editions of the tournament, only being stopped by James Wade in 2009 and Gary Anderson in 2011. The amount of participants in the event has varied over time. Originally consisting of seven players, a wildcard spot was introduced for the 2007 edition to bring the total to eight. The number increased to ten ahead of the 2013 edition, before reverting back to eight players in 2022. The tournament has expanded outside of the United Kingdom, with nights held in Germany, the Netherlands and Ireland, as well as Belgium from 2026 onward.

The 2026 Premier League took place from 5 February to 28 May 2026. Sportsbook BetMGM continued its sponsorship of the event after becoming title sponsor in 2024. Luke Humphries entered the tournament as defending champion after defeating Luke Littler 11–8 in the 2025 final to win his first Premier League title.

=== Format ===
The 2026 Premier League used the same format that was introduced for the 2022 edition. It remained an eight-person knockout bracket every Thursday night. The players were guaranteed to meet each other once in the quarter-finals throughout the first seven weeks, and once in the quarter-finals in weeks 9–15, with weeks 8 and 16 being drawn based on the league standings at that point. Players received two points per semi-final finish, three points per runner-up finish, and five points per final win. Following the league phase, the top four players in the table contested the two play-off semi-finals with 1st playing 4th and 2nd playing 3rd, where the winners progressed to the Premier League final.

All matches were played in leg format, with the number of legs required to win increasing as the tournament progressed:

- League stage: Best of 11 legs
- Semi-finals: Best of 19 legs
- Final: Best of 21 legs

=== Prize money ===
As part of the PDC's biggest prize money increase in its history, the prize fund for the 2026 Premier League was £1,250,000, up from £1,000,000 the previous year. The champion received £350,000 and each night's winner during the league phase earned a £10,000 bonus.

Stage	Prize money
Winner	£350,000
Runner-up	£170,000
Semi-finalists (x2)	£110,000
5th place	£95,000
6th place	£90,000
7th place	£85,000
8th place	£80,000
Weekly winner bonus (x16)	£10,000
Total	£1,250,000

=== Broadcasts ===
The tournament was broadcast on Sky Sports in the United Kingdom and Ireland. Other broadcasters included AMC Networks in Hungary; DAZN in Germany, Austria and Switzerland; Sport1 in Germany; Eurasian Broadcasting in Armenia, Azerbaijan, Belarus, Georgia, Kazakhstan, Kyrgyzstan, Moldova, Tajikistan, Turkmenistan, Ukraine and Uzbekistan; FanDuel TV in the United States and Brazil; Peacock in the United States and Canada; Fox Sports in Australia; L'Équipe in France; Nova in the Czech Republic and Slovakia; Sky Sport in New Zealand; VTM in Belgium; Arena Sport in Serbia, Bosnia and Herzegovina, Montenegro, North Macedonia, Kosovo; TV3 in the Baltic states; Viaplay in the Netherlands, Iceland, Denmark and Norway; beIN Sports in the Middle East and North Africa; and Zonasport in Croatia. It was also available for subscribers outside of Germany, Austria and Switzerland on the PDC's streaming service, PDCTV.

== Venues ==
The 2026 Premier League consisted of 17 nights, held in cities across the United Kingdom, Ireland, Germany, the Netherlands and Belgium. The 2026 edition marked the introduction of Belgium to the schedule, with a night at the AFAS Dome in Antwerp replacing Westpoint Exeter in Exeter.

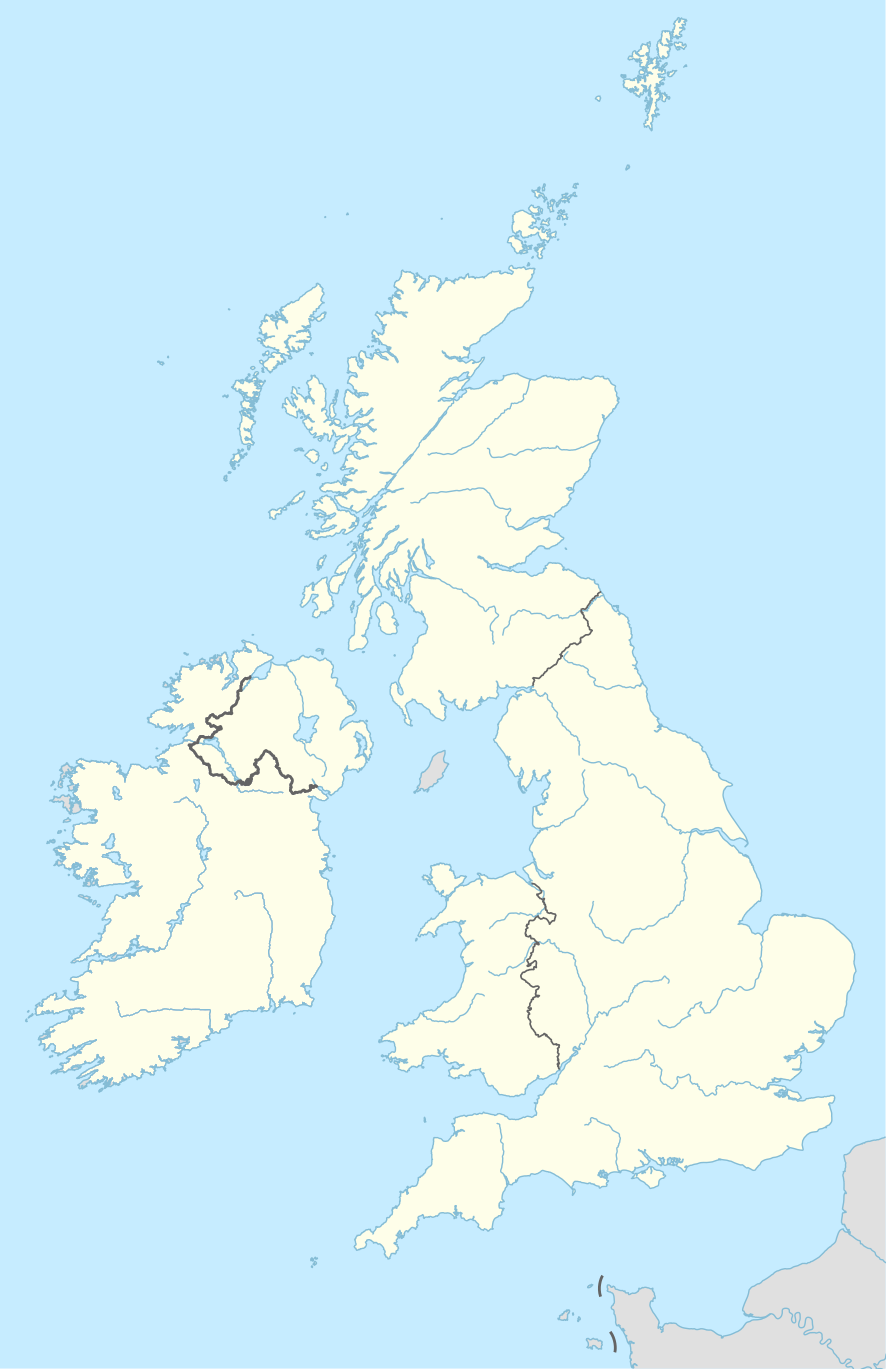
Locations of the 2026 Premier League venues in the UK and Ireland
Locations of the 2026 Premier League venues in mainland Europe

(England) Newcastle	(Belgium) Antwerp	(Scotland) Glasgow	(Northern Ireland) Belfast
Newcastle Arena Thursday 5 February	AFAS Dome Thursday 12 February	OVO Hydro Thursday 19 February	SSE Arena Belfast Thursday 26 February
(Wales) Cardiff	(England) Nottingham	(Republic of Ireland) Dublin	(Germany) Berlin
Cardiff International Arena Thursday 5 March	Nottingham Arena Thursday 12 March	3Arena Thursday 19 March	Uber Arena Thursday 26 March
(England) Manchester	(England) Brighton	(Netherlands) Rotterdam	(England) Liverpool
Manchester Arena Thursday 2 April	Brighton Centre Thursday 9 April	Rotterdam Ahoy Thursday 16 April	Liverpool Arena Thursday 23 April
(Scotland) Aberdeen	(England) Leeds	(England) Birmingham	(England) Sheffield
P&J Live Thursday 30 April	Leeds Arena Thursday 7 May	Arena Birmingham Thursday 14 May	Sheffield Arena Thursday 21 May
(England) London
The O2 Arena Thursday 28 May

== Players ==
Eight players were invited to participate in the event. The top four players on the PDC Order of Merit following the 2026 PDC World Darts Championship—Luke Littler, Luke Humphries, Gian van Veen and Michael van Gerwen—qualified automatically. The remaining players—Jonny Clayton, Stephen Bunting, Josh Rock and Gerwyn Price—were chosen as wildcard selections by the PDC, and were revealed live on Sky Sports News on 5 January 2026. The announcement saw three changes made from the 2025 lineup, with Van Veen, Clayton and Rock replacing Rob Cross, Chris Dobey and Nathan Aspinall. Van Veen and Rock both made their Premier League debuts, while Clayton returned to the tournament for the first time since 2023. Notable omissions from the tournament were Aspinall, world number 10 Danny Noppert, and world number 11 James Wade.

Player	Appearance in Premier League	Consecutive streak	Order of Merit rank	Previous best performance
Luke Littler (ENG)	3rd	3	1	Winner (2024)
Luke Humphries (ENG)	3rd (Note: Humphries previously appeared as a one-off challenger in both 2019 and 2020.)	3	2	Winner (2025)
Gian van Veen (NED)	1st	1	3	Debut
Michael van Gerwen (NED)	14th	14	4	Winner (2013, 2016, 2017, 2018, 2019, 2022, 2023)
Jonny Clayton (WAL)	4th	1	5	Winner (2021)
Stephen Bunting (ENG)	3rd (Note: Bunting previously appeared as a one-off challenger in 2020.)	2	7	8th (2015, 2025)
Josh Rock (NIR)	1st	1	9	Debut
Gerwyn Price (WAL)	8th	5	12	Runner-up (2023)

== Summary ==
=== Night 1 – Night 4 ===
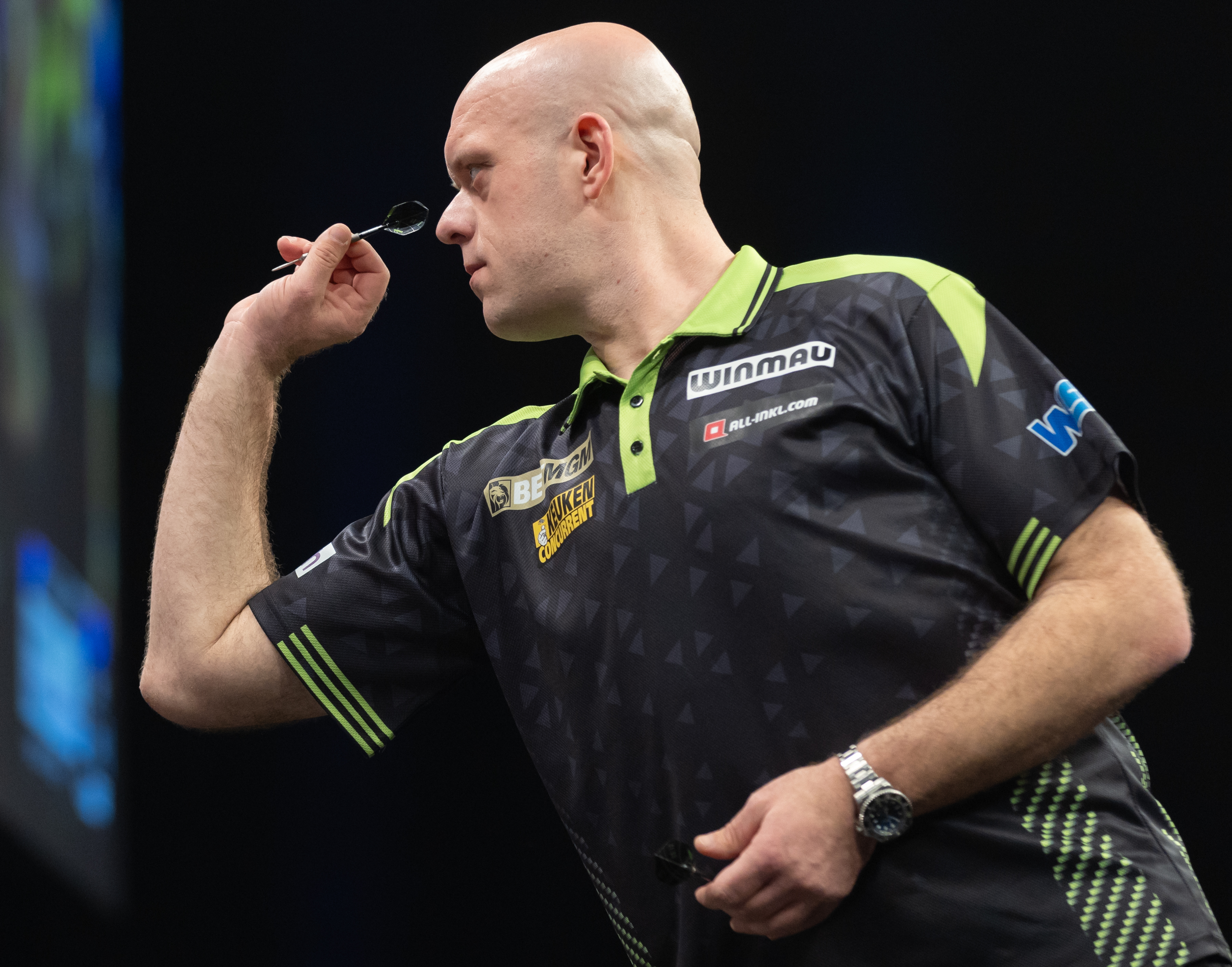
Seven-time champion Michael van Gerwen (pictured on night eight) won the opening night, having failed to win a night during the 2025 edition.

On night one in Newcastle, reigning world champion Luke Littler faced Premier League debutant Gian van Veen in a rematch of the 2026 World Championship final. Van Veen won the match 6–4 before beating 2021 champion Jonny Clayton 6–4 in the semi-finals. He set up an all-Dutch final against seven-time champion Michael van Gerwen, who earned 6–2 wins over Stephen Bunting and defending champion Luke Humphries. In the final, Van Gerwen defeated Van Veen 6–4 to claim his first Premier League nightly win since the 2024 edition. Van Gerwen expressed his desire to qualify for the play-offs but stated they were not his "main priority", explaining that ranking tournaments were more important to him than non-ranking tournaments such as the Premier League. In the Premier League's first visit to Antwerp on night two, Gerwyn Price reached the final following 6–5 victories over Van Veen and Clayton, the latter marking his 10th consecutive win against his Welsh compatriot. Price won the night by defeating Van Gerwen 6–3.

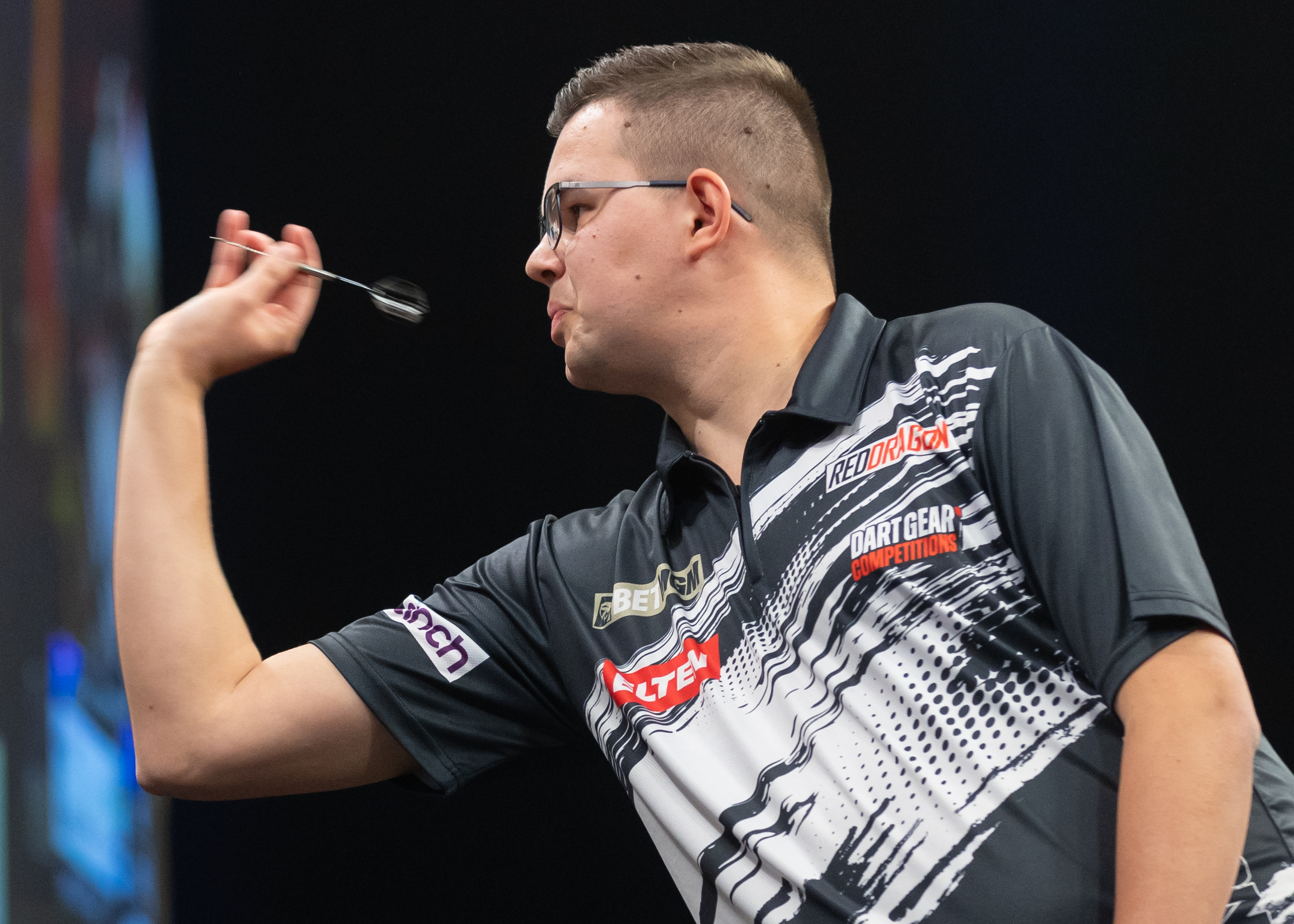
Gian van Veen (pictured on night eight) reached three of the first four nightly finals.

Ahead of the third week in Glasgow, the PDC announced that Van Gerwen had withdrawn from the night due to illness, leading to his scheduled opponent Littler receiving a bye to the semi-finals. Clayton ended his losing streak to Price before beating Littler 6–1 and Van Veen 6–2 to win night three and move to the top of the league table. On night four in Belfast, Northern Ireland's Josh Rock hit a nine-dart finish—the 22nd nine-darter in Premier League Darts history—in the seventh leg of his 6–2 loss to Van Veen. Rock received a set of 18-carat golden darts worth £30,000 for the achievement. Despite his fourth consecutive opening-match defeat, he said that hitting a nine-darter in front of his home crowd was "phenomenal". He continued: "I honestly don’t care if I never hit a nine-darter in my life again—to have it in Belfast has just made my life a dream come true." Bunting secured his first points through a 6–4 victory over Humphries and a 6–0 whitewash of Clayton, before winning the week outright with a 6–2 win against Van Veen. Moving up to fifth in the table, Bunting called it "one of the best wins of my career".

=== Night 5 – Night 8 ===
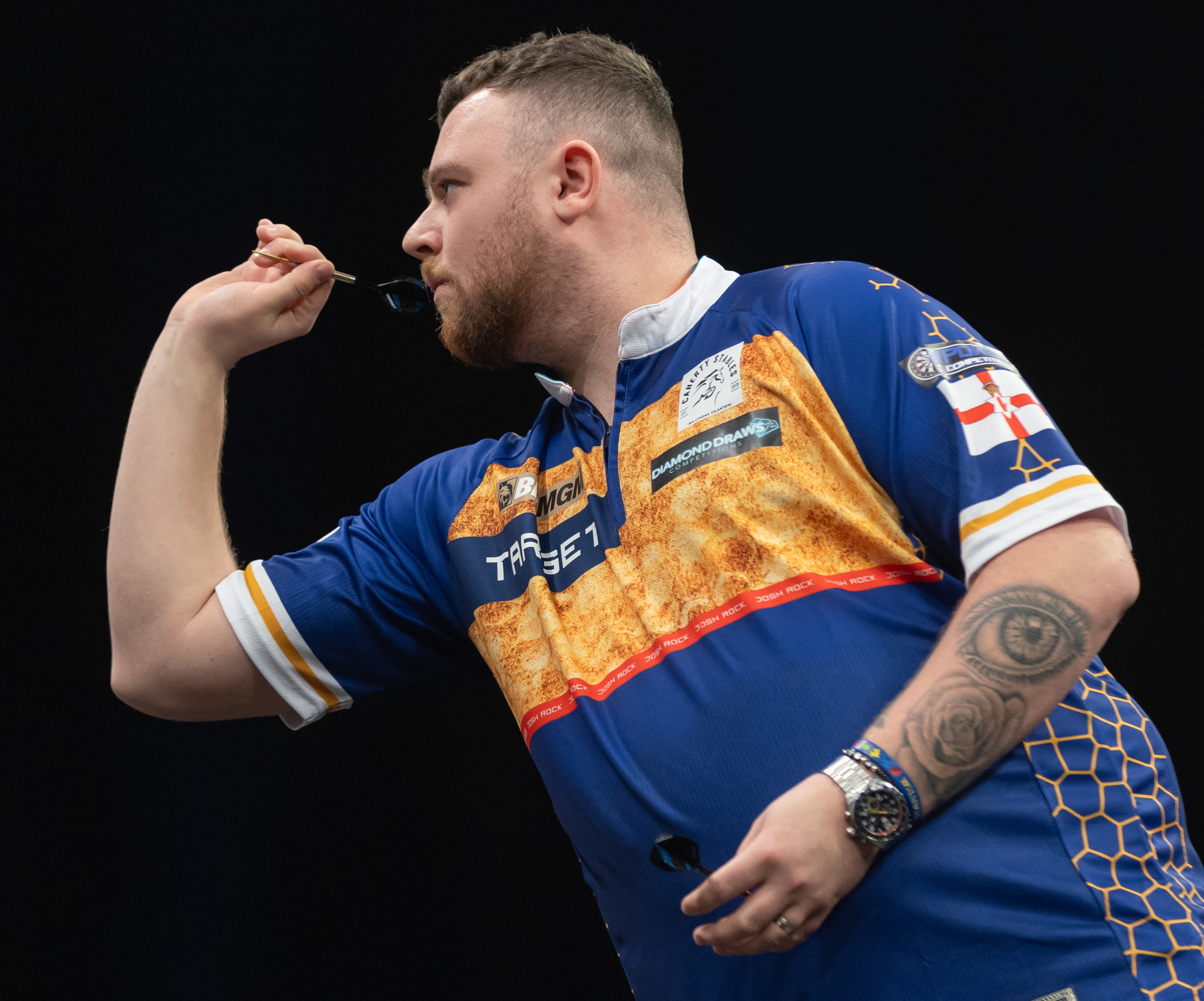
Josh Rock (pictured on night eight), who hit a nine-dart finish on night four, earned his first points of the tournament on night eight.

On night five in Cardiff, Luke Littler became the fifth different nightly winner in five weeks, rising from seventh to third in the table. After defeating Josh Rock, he produced a three-dart average of 111.05 and landed a 170 checkout to beat Gerwyn Price 6–3 in the semi-finals. He hit another 170 checkout and missed double 15 for a nine-dart finish on his way to winning the final 6–4 against Jonny Clayton. On night six in Nottingham, Clayton became the first two-time winner during the season's league stage. He followed 6–3 wins over Michael van Gerwen and Stephen Bunting with a 6–1 victory against Luke Humphries in the night's final, putting him eight points clear at the top of the table. Night six marked Humphries' first final of the season, which he reached after beating Littler 6–5 in the semi-final—his first win over Littler since their 2025 Premier League final. Suffering with gout in his ankle during the night's action, Clayton remarked that he "wasn't expecting much", revealing that he had to keep practising as his condition got worse when he sat down.

Ahead of the seventh week in Dublin, the PDC announced that Gian van Veen had withdrawn from the night after being diagnosed with kidney stones, leading to his scheduled opponent Van Gerwen receiving a bye to the semi-finals. Following a 6–3 win against Bunting, Littler survived a total of eight match darts—three from Van Gerwen and five from Price—to win the night, staging a comeback from 5–0 down to defeat Price 6–5 in the final. "I have no idea how I have done that," admitted Littler, who jokingly waved goodbye to the crowd when Price attempted match-winning shots while 5–1 ahead. "I may as well have been off the stage. This is darts, things happen." On night eight in Berlin, Rock earned his first win of the tournament, defeating Clayton 6–3 in the quarter-finals before being eliminated in the semi-finals by Van Gerwen. Littler surpassed Clayton at the top of the table by beating Van Gerwen 6–4 in the night's final, where Littler hit two 170 checkouts.

=== Night 9 – Night 12 ===
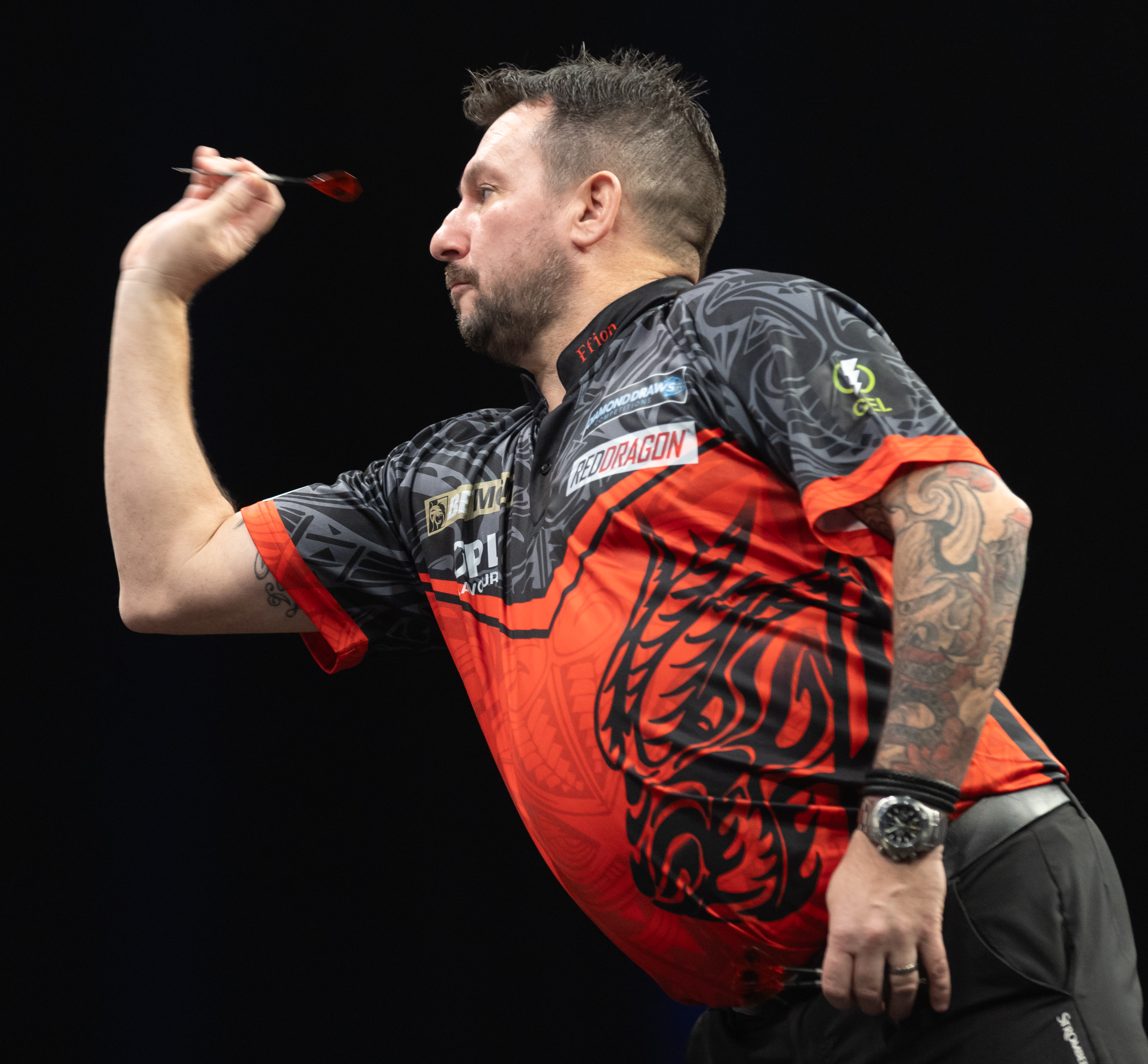
The 2021 champion Jonny Clayton (pictured on night eight) won the night ten final 6–5 after trailing Michael van Gerwen 5–2. He won a second successive final on night eleven by defeating Luke Littler 6–4.

In the final leg of his quarter-final match against Luke Littler on night nine in Manchester, Gian van Veen missed a match dart at double 15 and turned his head to see celebrations from Littler, who gestured towards Van Veen to continue playing. Littler then missed two match darts of his own and mimed a crybaby in front of the crowd as Van Veen secured a 6–5 victory, leading to a brief handshake between the two players. The Dutchman called Littler's behaviour "out of order", to which Littler responded by posting laughing emojis on his Instagram story, as well as an image showing his list of PDC titles. Van Veen later stated: "I'm here for myself. He's a fantastic darter, the world No 1, so what he does for the sport is great, but I care little about what he thinks of me." He reached the final of the night, where he lost 6–2 to Gerwyn Price. On night ten in Brighton, Jonny Clayton reclaimed his position at the top of the table by winning his third night, defeating Michael van Gerwen 6–5 in the final after initially trailing 5–2. Speaking afterwards, Clayton stated it was "time for Luke Littler to start chasing me again".

Despite boos from the Dutch crowd on night eleven in Rotterdam, Littler reached the final following wins over Price and Luke Humphries, whereas home favourites Van Veen and Van Gerwen were eliminated in their respective opening matches against Humphries and Clayton. Clayton defeated Littler 6–4 to win the night and establish a five-point lead over second-placed Littler. On night twelve in Liverpool, Littler was met with boos again but went on to secure his fourth nightly win, defeating Humphries, Van Gerwen, and Clayton. Addressing the race at the top of the table, Littler said: "I'm very close to Jonny [Clayton] now, three points off. I'm going to go chasing—I want to finish top once again—and if it's not to be, it's not to be. But there's still four weeks to go."

=== Night 13 – Night 16 ===
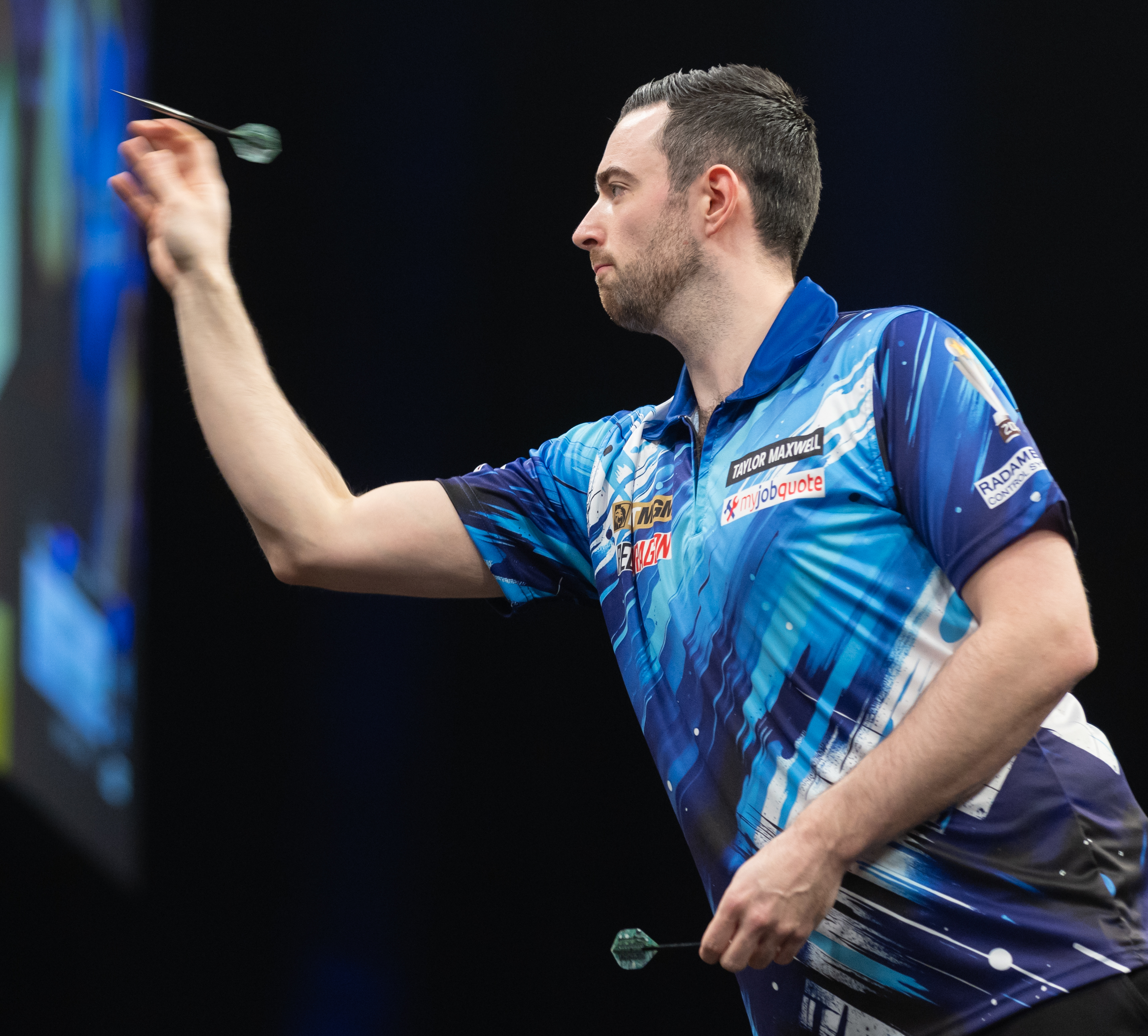
The defending champion Luke Humphries (pictured on night eight) secured his place in the play-offs by winning night fifteen, joining Luke Littler, Jonny Clayton, and Gerwyn Price.

On night thirteen in Aberdeen, Luke Littler claimed his fifth nightly win by recovering from 5–3 down to defeat Luke Humphries 6–5 in the final. Littler went two points clear of Jonny Clayton, who lost 6–2 to Gian van Veen in the quarter-finals, while Humphries went within two points of the top four. With Littler and Clayton securing qualification for the play-offs, this left Gerwyn Price, Michael van Gerwen, Van Veen, Humphries, Stephen Bunting, and Josh Rock to claim the last two spots in the remaining three weeks of the league stage. Littler secured his third nightly win in a row on night fourteen in Leeds with another 6–5 victory over Humphries, who missed a match dart for his third nightly win in Leeds in three years. This brought Littler to six nightly wins, equalling his own record for the most in a single Premier League season, which he set the previous year. "I'm very happy with myself and now I can go on to break my own record," he said afterwards. Humphries entered the play-off spots in fourth place, behind Price and ahead of Van Gerwen, while Rock's elimination from play-off contention was confirmed with a 6–5 loss to Humphries in the quarter-finals.

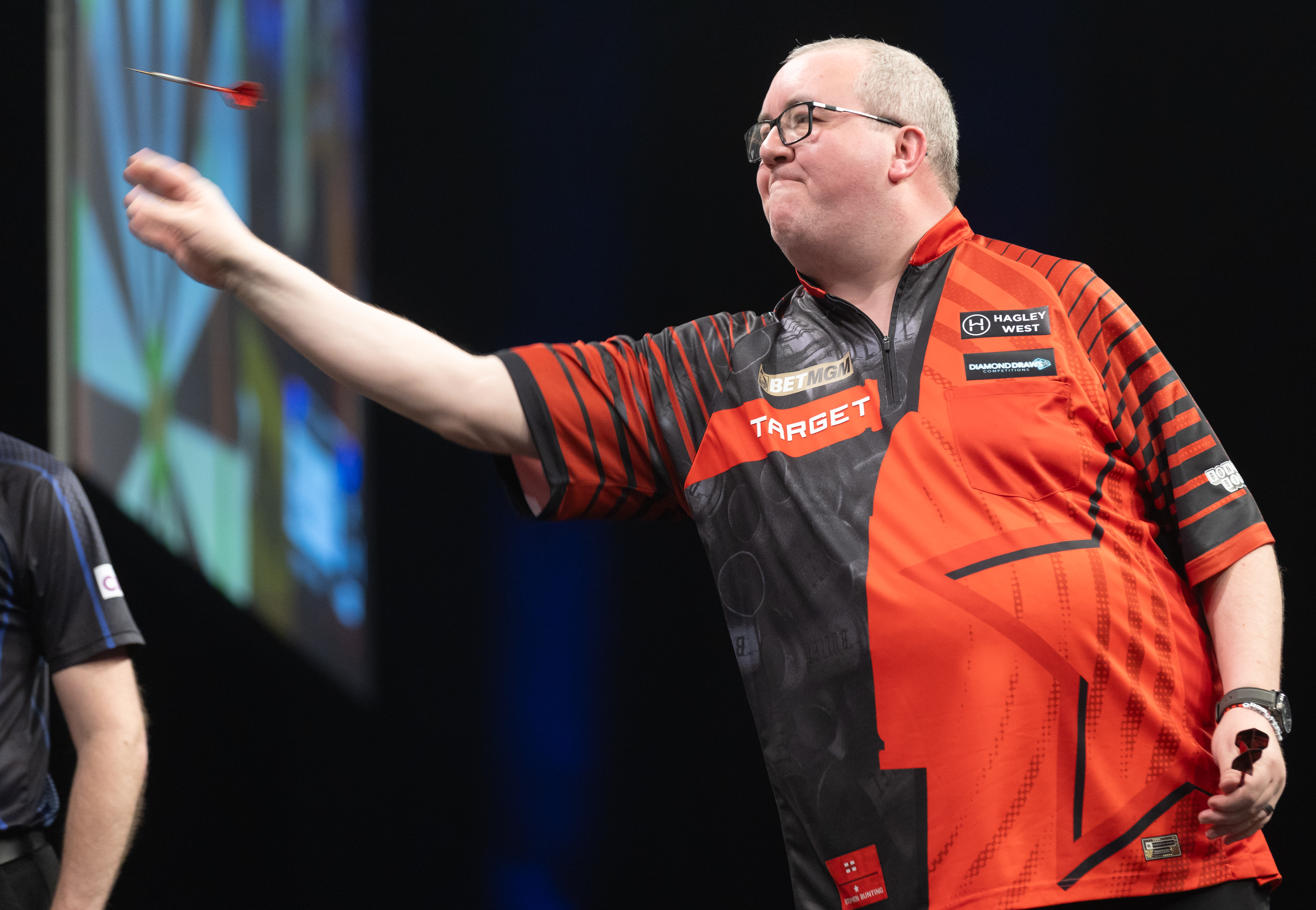
Stephen Bunting (pictured on night eight) won his second night of the season on night sixteen, which resulted in him finishing fifth in the league table.

Littler whitewashed Clayton 6–0 in the quarter-finals of night fifteen in Birmingham, guaranteeing that he would finish the league stage at the top of the table for the third consecutive year. In the semi-finals, Humphries came back from 3–0 down to defeat Littler 6–3, while a 6–4 win over Van Veen ensured Price's qualification for the play-offs. In his third consecutive nightly final, Humphries beat Price 6–4 to earn his first nightly win of the season and secure his place in the play-offs alongside Littler, Clayton, and Price. Van Gerwen missed out on the play-offs for the third time overall and second time in a row, while Van Veen and Bunting's eliminations were also confirmed, joining the already-eliminated Rock. Speaking after the final, Humphries described his Premier League campaign as "a struggle", declaring: "I'm just incredibly proud of myself. Probably the most proud I've been in my life." On night sixteen in Sheffield, the final week of the league stage, Bunting earned his second nightly win by defeating Humphries 6–3 in the final, overtaking Van Gerwen and Van Veen to finish in fifth. On his final appearance of the season, Bunting said: "People wrote me off and said I shouldn't be in it. I want to be in this Premier League for years to come. That was a massive statement from me." Humphries' run to the final confirmed his third-place finish, meaning he would face second-placed Clayton in the play-off semi-finals, while first-placed Littler was paired with fourth-placed Price.

=== Finals Night ===
The play-offs were played on Finals Night on 28 May, where Luke Littler faced Gerwyn Price and Luke Humphries faced Jonny Clayton in the semi-finals. Littler, Humphries, and Clayton maintained their perfect records of qualifying for Finals Night; Littler and Humphries debuted in 2024 and contested the 2024 and 2025 finals, while Clayton had qualified for the play-offs in each of his appearances since his debut in 2021. Clayton was also the only player to stay in the top four of the table for the duration of the league stage. Meanwhile, Price was the only member of the lineup who had not won the Premier League before.

==== Semi-finals ====
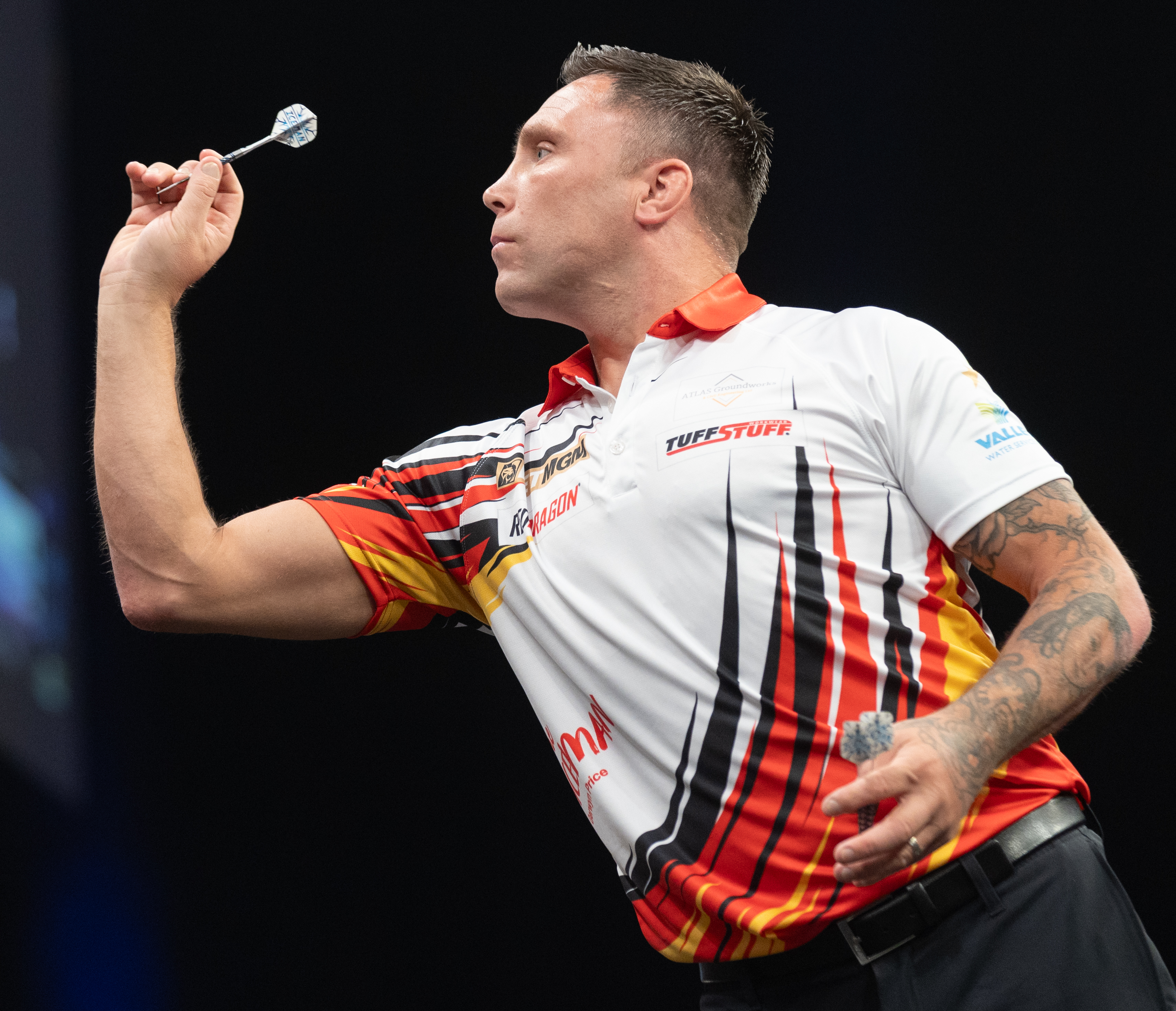
Gerwyn Price (pictured on night eight) almost completed a comeback from 9–4 down against Luke Littler in the play-off semi-finals, but Littler won the match 10–9.

In the first semi-final between Littler and Price, Price was the better scorer during the early proceedings, but it was Littler who entered the interval with a 6–4 lead. He then won the next three legs, completing a run of five consecutive legs to extend his advantage to 9–4, one away from victory. In the 15th leg, Price scored 170 and made a "reeling in the big fish" gesture at the crowd while Littler threw, leading to a warning from referee Huw Ware and Price apologising to Littler. Capitalising on a series of missed match darts from Littler, Price staged a comeback and completed his own five-leg run to level the score at 9–9, hitting three ton-plus checkouts along the way. However, Littler won the deciding leg with a 14-dart hold of throw, pinning double 16 for his seventh match dart to claim a 10–9 victory—his ninth consecutive win over the Welshman—and progress to the final. "He [Price] obviously said well done and then he said 'I was thinking about Dublin' when I came back against him," Littler disclosed after the match, referring to when he came back from 5–0 down to beat Price 6–5 in the night seven final. "Every leg Gez [Gerwyn Price] kept winning, I was just like 'don't let it happen'." In response to the defeat, Price said on Instagram: "Not sharp enough when it mattered, tough long campaign this year but enjoyed every minute."

In the second semi-final between Humphries and Clayton, the defending champion initially took a 6–2 lead, but Clayton claimed the next two legs to reduce his deficit to 6–4 at the interval. After the break, Clayton was able to level the match at 7–7, before a 10-dart leg and a break of throw put him 9–7 ahead, meaning he had won seven of the last eight legs. Humphries hit a 121 checkout in the 18th leg to force another deciding leg. In the final leg, Humphries missed a match dart at the bullseye, while Clayton missed a match dart at double 16. Clayton was visibly annoyed by someone in the crowd, who appeared to whistle as the Welshman threw at the winning double. Humphries came back for a 25 finish, which he converted to seal a 10–9 win. Humphries admitted that he thought Clayton's match dart was "definitely going in" and that his opponent "wouldn't lie" about the distraction, adding: "You don't want to win like that unfortunately, but you see it a lot." Clayton earned £150,000 for his Premier League campaign—£110,000 for being a semi-finalist and an additional £40,000 for winning four nights—while Price's two nightly wins took his earnings to £130,000.

==== Final ====
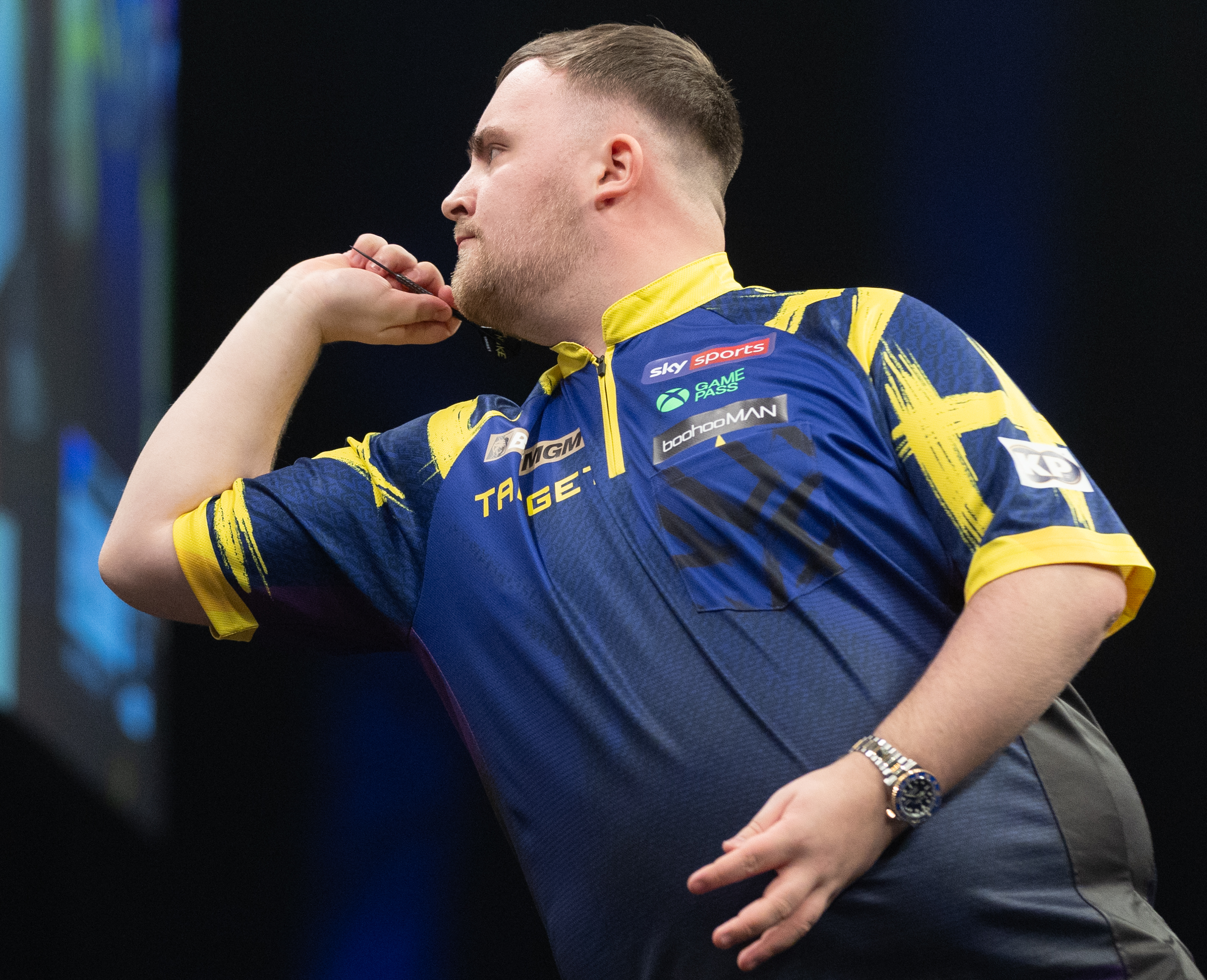
World number one Luke Littler (pictured on night eight) won his second Premier League title, defeating Luke Humphries 11–10 in the pair's third consecutive final.

The final was contested between world number one Littler and world number two Humphries. It was the third consecutive year that the English pair played each other in the Premier League final, after Littler won the title in 2024 and Humphries won the rematch in 2025. It was the duo's 36th meeting in all competitions. Humphries was looking to become the third player to retain the Premier League title, after Phil Taylor and Michael van Gerwen.

Humphries opened the final with successive 13-dart legs, but Littler claimed the next three to take a 3–2 lead. After winning the proceeding leg, Humphries converted three consecutive ton-plus finishes—134, 112, and 121—as he went 6–3 in front, entering the interval with a 6–4 lead. Littler responded to his deficit by levelling the match at 7–7, winning four of the last five legs. The compatriots remained equal at 9–9, with a 10-dart break of throw from Littler giving him the lead and the chance to win the match. However, he missed a match dart and Humphries returned with a 68 checkout to send the match to a deciding leg. Attempting to hold throw, Humphries was able to leave a one-dart finish, but Littler hit double 20 with his last dart in hand to complete an 11–10 victory. Littler finished the final with a three-dart average of 111.67 and 12 maximums, while Humphries averaged 105.60. The 11–10 result meant that for the first time in Premier League history, all 59 possible legs were played on Finals Night. The match, touted as one of the best finals in the competition's history, was also the third Premier League final to go to a deciding leg, after 2017 and 2022, and the first decider where the loser did not miss darts for the title.

Littler won his second Premier League title, his fourth major title of 2026 after triumphs at the World Championship, the World Masters, and the UK Open. The win meant that Littler was the reigning champion of eight different major tournaments. He also became the fourth player to win multiple Premier League titles, after Taylor, Van Gerwen and Gary Anderson. Factoring in bonuses for nightly wins, Littler received £410,000 in total for winning the tournament, while Humphries received £180,000 for his runner-up finish. Littler broke down in tears during his post-match interview as he talked about the reactions he had received from the crowd during his Premier League campaign. He revealed that he wanted to quit the Premier League midway through the season, stating: "After Brighton and the incident in Manchester, I was sat at home saying to Faith [his partner] 'I don't want to do it any more, just the crowd every week'. I said to her 'I'm down bad'." He addressed his comments in a later press conference, saying he was "not asking for sympathy" and that the biggest outcome of the night was the trophy. "I'm not sure of the stats, but it was probably one of the best finals the Premier League has seen," said Humphries in defeat, admitting that he was "gutted" that Littler did not miss his final dart at double 20. In light of Littler's post-match reaction, he commented on the struggles of competing in the Premier League, stating: "It is emotional, you have seen it from Luke [Littler] there. You are playing in big finals and it shows how much it means to us as players ... You are on the road for 16 or 17 weeks and I don't get the chance to take my family with me. You want that trophy in your hands." Commentator and pundit Wayne Mardle expressed that Littler's comments were a "step forward" for him. He added: "We know how strong Littler is mentally but when you are feeling like you're public enemy number one, you can feel like you don't want to turn up. But he did turn up and this is the by-product of turning up."

== League stage ==
The fixtures were released on 22 January 2026. All matches during the league stage were played to the best of 11 legs. Match winners are shown in bold and all players are accompanied by their three-dart average for the match.

=== 5 February – Night 1 ===
(England) **Newcastle Arena, Newcastle**

**Quarter-finals**
Josh Rock 101.83	2
**Jonny Clayton 109.81**	**6**
Luke Littler 96.98	4
**Gian van Veen 95.55**	**6**
**Luke Humphries 104.55**	**6**
Gerwyn Price 94.92	5
Stephen Bunting 97.59	2
**Michael van Gerwen 100.58**	**6**

**Semi-finals**
Jonny Clayton 94.86	4
**Gian van Veen 98.37**	**6**
Luke Humphries 97.02	2
**Michael van Gerwen 97.88**	**6**

**Final**
Gian van Veen 90.57	4
**Michael van Gerwen 97.81**	**6**

Night 1 Statistics
Night's Total Average: **98.14**
Highest Checkout: Michael van Gerwen **117**
Most 180s: Michael van Gerwen **12**
Night's 180s: **44**

=== 12 February – Night 2 ===
(Belgium) **AFAS Dome, Antwerp**

**Quarter-finals**
**Luke Littler 105.16**	**6**
Luke Humphries 102.37	5
**Michael van Gerwen 89.05**	**6**
Josh Rock 79.34	2
**Jonny Clayton 103.93**	**6**
Stephen Bunting 99.55	4
**Gerwyn Price 94.46**	**6**
Gian van Veen 95.61	5

**Semi-finals**
Luke Littler 95.18	4
**Michael van Gerwen 100.70**	**6**
Jonny Clayton 95.19	5
**Gerwyn Price 100.87**	**6**

**Final**
Michael van Gerwen 96.29	3
**Gerwyn Price 104.44**	**6**

Night 2 Statistics
Night's Total Average: **97.36**
Highest Checkout: Michael van Gerwen **167**
Most 180s: Gerwyn Price **9**
Night's 180s: **40**

=== 19 February – Night 3 ===
(Scotland) **OVO Hydro, Glasgow**

**Quarter-finals**
Stephen Bunting 99.84	3
**Gian van Veen 104.36**	**6**
**Luke Humphries 105.95**	**6**
Josh Rock 97.11	2
Michael van Gerwen	(Note: Van Gerwen withdrew from the night due to illness.)
**Luke Littler**	**w/o**
**Jonny Clayton 99.88**	**6**
Gerwyn Price 91.96	3

**Semi-finals**
**Gian van Veen 95.75**	**6**
Luke Humphries 103.25	5
Luke Littler 97.84	1
**Jonny Clayton 101.33**	**6**

**Final**
Gian van Veen 94.57	2
**Jonny Clayton 104.35**	**6**

Night 3 Statistics
Night's Total Average: **99.63**
Highest Checkout: Jonny Clayton **156**
Most 180s: Luke Humphries **10**
Night's 180s: **32**

=== 26 February – Night 4 ===
(Northern Ireland) **SSE Arena, Belfast**

**Quarter-finals**
Luke Littler 95.53	3
**Jonny Clayton 96.16**	**6**
**Stephen Bunting 106.63**	**6**
Luke Humphries 106.29	4
Michael van Gerwen 94.06	5
**Gerwyn Price 100.08**	**6**
**Gian van Veen 96.08**	**6**
Josh Rock 91.05	2

**Semi-finals**
Jonny Clayton 90.04	0
**Stephen Bunting 106.09**	**6**
Gerwyn Price 102.13	5
**Gian van Veen 105.22**	**6**

**Final**
**Stephen Bunting 97.15**	**6**
Gian van Veen 95.76	2

Night 4 Statistics
Night's Total Average: **99.02**
Highest Checkout: Gian van Veen **167**
Most 180s: Gerwyn Price **9**
Night's 180s: **36**
Nine-Dart Finish: Josh Rock

=== 5 March – Night 5 ===
(Wales) **Cardiff International Arena, Cardiff**

**Quarter-finals**
Michael van Gerwen 92.36	1
**Luke Humphries 96.21**	**6**
Gian van Veen 92.65	4
**Jonny Clayton 95.54**	**6**
**Gerwyn Price 92.75**	**6**
Stephen Bunting 97.02	5
**Luke Littler 96.20**	**6**
Josh Rock 103.72	4

**Semi-finals**
Luke Humphries 91.06	4
**Jonny Clayton 94.98**	**6**
Gerwyn Price 97.34	3
**Luke Littler 111.05**	**6**

**Final**
Jonny Clayton 100.90	4
**Luke Littler 106.44**	**6**

Night 5 Statistics
**Night's Total Average: 97.51**
Highest Checkout: Luke Littler **170** (x2)
Most 180s: Jonny Clayton **13**
Night's 180s: **40**

=== 12 March – Night 6 ===
(England) **Nottingham Arena, Nottingham**

**Quarter-finals**
Josh Rock 82.88	1
**Stephen Bunting 91.24**	**6**
**Jonny Clayton 95.47**	**6**
Michael van Gerwen 91.01	3
**Luke Humphries 95.94**	**6**
Gian van Veen 89.96	4
Gerwyn Price 101.31	5
**Luke Littler 108.66**	**6**

**Semi-finals**
Stephen Bunting 94.37	3
**Jonny Clayton 95.27**	**6**
**Luke Humphries 105.71**	**6**
Luke Littler 101.31	5

**Final**
**Jonny Clayton 99.59**	**6**
Luke Humphries 97.56	1

Night 6 Statistics
**Night's Total Average: 96.76**
Highest Checkout: Gerwyn Price **152**
Most 180s: Luke Littler **13**
Night's 180s: **42**

=== 19 March – Night 7 ===
(Republic of Ireland) **3Arena, Dublin**

**Quarter-finals**
Gian van Veen	(Note: Van Veen withdrew from the night after being diagnosed with kidney stones.)
**Michael van Gerwen**	**w/o**
Stephen Bunting 104.10	3
**Luke Littler 105.07**	**6**
Josh Rock 84.21	0
**Gerwyn Price 103.66**	**6**
Jonny Clayton 95.14	3
**Luke Humphries 103.44**	**6**

**Semi-finals**
Michael van Gerwen 98.90	5
**Luke Littler 102.45**	**6**
**Gerwyn Price 109.04**	**6**
Luke Humphries 101.35	1

**Final**
**Luke Littler 95.54**	**6**
Gerwyn Price 93.16	5

Night 7 Statistics
Night's Total Average: **99.44**
Highest Checkout: Michael van Gerwen and Luke Littler **170**
Most 180s: Luke Littler **12**
Night's 180s: **32**

=== 26 March – Night 8 ===
(Germany) **Uber Arena, Berlin**

**Quarter-finals**
1	Jonny Clayton 89.36	3
**8**	**Josh Rock 89.22**	**6**
4	Luke Humphries 96.07	3
**5**	**Michael van Gerwen 99.04**	**6**
**2**	**Luke Littler 105.72**	**6**
7	Stephen Bunting 107.47	3
**3**	**Gerwyn Price 101.56**	**6**
6	Gian van Veen 91.50	1

**Semi-finals**
8	Josh Rock 90.14	3
**5**	**Michael van Gerwen 96.42**	**6**
**2**	**Luke Littler 108.58**	**6**
3	Gerwyn Price 98.17	4

**Final**
5	Michael van Gerwen 103.87	4
**2**	**Luke Littler 106.36**	**6**

Night 8 Statistics
Night's Total Average: **98.65**
Highest Checkout: Luke Littler **170** (x2)
Most 180s: Luke Littler **10**
Night's 180s: **37**

=== 2 April – Night 9 ===
(England) **Manchester Arena, Manchester**

**Quarter-finals**
Michael van Gerwen 104.07	3
**Stephen Bunting 95.70**	**6**
**Gerwyn Price 104.46**	**6**
Luke Humphries 101.64	2
**Gian van Veen 96.26**	**6**
Luke Littler 98.56	5
Jonny Clayton 107.44	4
**Josh Rock 101.91**	**6**

**Semi-finals**
Stephen Bunting 106.66	2
**Gerwyn Price 112.91**	**6**
**Gian van Veen 95.06**	**6**
Josh Rock 102.84	3

**Final**
**Gerwyn Price 105.84**	**6**
Gian van Veen 92.07	2

Night 9 Statistics
Night's Total Average: **101.55**
Highest Checkout: Gerwyn Price **170**
Most 180s: Josh Rock **9**
Night's 180s: **41**

=== 9 April – Night 10 ===
(England) **The Brighton Centre, Brighton**

**Quarter-finals**
Luke Humphries 96.13	5
**Jonny Clayton 98.37**	**6**
Gerwyn Price 96.00	3
**Josh Rock 96.49**	**6**
Luke Littler 83.94	4
**Stephen Bunting 91.30**	**6**
**Michael van Gerwen 95.44**	**6**
Gian van Veen 94.49	4

**Semi-finals**
**Jonny Clayton 96.31**	**6**
Josh Rock 93.14	4
Stephen Bunting 93.11	5
**Michael van Gerwen 90.92**	**6**

**Final**
**Jonny Clayton 97.39**	**6**
Michael van Gerwen 101.34	5

Night 10 Statistics
Night's Total Average: **94.49**
Highest Checkout: Josh Rock **164**
Most 180s: Michael van Gerwen **8**
Night's 180s: **33**

=== 16 April – Night 11 ===
(Netherlands) **Rotterdam Ahoy, Rotterdam**

**Quarter-finals**
**Luke Littler 97.30**	**6**
Gerwyn Price 91.44	3
Gian van Veen 93.36	2
**Luke Humphries 100.51**	**6**
Michael van Gerwen 97.97	2
**Jonny Clayton 99.33**	**6**
Stephen Bunting 104.81	1
**Josh Rock 102.55**	**6**

**Semi-finals**
**Luke Littler 100.85**	**6**
Luke Humphries 103.00	5
**Jonny Clayton 87.96**	**6**
Josh Rock 96.05	5

**Final**
Luke Littler 95.41	4
**Jonny Clayton 92.92**	**6**

Night 11 Statistics
Night's Total Average: **96.97**
Highest Checkout: Jonny Clayton **170**
Most 180s: Josh Rock , Luke Littler and Jonny Clayton **9**
Night's 180s: **40**

=== 23 April – Night 12 ===
(England) **Liverpool Arena, Liverpool**

**Quarter-finals**
**Gian van Veen 90.97**	**6**
Gerwyn Price 93.61	4
Stephen Bunting 90.42	5
**Jonny Clayton 93.85**	**6**
Josh Rock 91.89	3
**Michael van Gerwen 98.64**	**6**
Luke Humphries 99.39	2
**Luke Littler 97.22**	**6**

**Semi-finals**
Gian van Veen 98.04	5
**Jonny Clayton 102.37**	**6**
Michael van Gerwen 107.54	5
**Luke Littler 102.06**	**6**

**Final**
Jonny Clayton 99.16	1
**Luke Littler 104.54**	**6**

Night 12 Statistics
Night's Total Average: **97.51**
Highest Checkout: Jonny Clayton **156**
Most 180s: Michael van Gerwen **14**
Night's 180s: **55**

=== 30 April – Night 13 ===
(Scotland) **P&J Live, Aberdeen**

**Quarter-finals**
Josh Rock 101.25	3
**Luke Littler 105.86**	**6**
Stephen Bunting 97.02	5
**Gerwyn Price 95.98**	**6**
Jonny Clayton 95.14	2
**Gian van Veen 104.32**	**6**
**Luke Humphries 99.18**	**6**
Michael van Gerwen 91.02	3

**Semi-finals**
**Luke Littler 98.34**	**6**
Gerwyn Price 94.18	1
Gian van Veen 102.67	3
**Luke Humphries 101.80**	**6**

**Final**
**Luke Littler 104.11**	**6**
Luke Humphries 103.10	5

Night 13 Statistics
Night's Total Average: **99.58**
Highest Checkout: Luke Humphries **160**
Most 180s: Luke Humphries **10**
Night's 180s: **41**

=== 7 May – Night 14 ===
(England) **Leeds Arena, Leeds**

**Quarter-finals**
Gerwyn Price 97.34	2
**Jonny Clayton 98.53**	**6**
**Luke Littler 100.28**	**6**
Michael van Gerwen 101.15	5
Josh Rock 91.65	5
**Luke Humphries 95.32**	**6**
Gian van Veen 90.61	5
**Stephen Bunting 90.14**	**6**

**Semi-finals**
Jonny Clayton 98.82	5
**Luke Littler 94.69**	**6**
**Luke Humphries 106.68**	**6**
Stephen Bunting 105.67	5

**Final**
**Luke Littler 100.67**	**6**
Luke Humphries 100.90	5

Night 14 Statistics
Night's Total Average: **97.79**
Highest Checkout: Luke Littler **146**
Most 180s: Luke Littler **14**
Night's 180s: **54**

=== 14 May – Night 15 ===
(England) **Arena Birmingham, Birmingham**

**Quarter-finals**
Josh Rock 92.30	3
**Gian van Veen 102.14**	**6**
**Gerwyn Price 101.32**	**6**
Michael van Gerwen 87.96	4
**Luke Humphries 107.36**	**6**
Stephen Bunting 92.46	0
Jonny Clayton 93.07	0
**Luke Littler 100.20**	**6**

**Semi-finals**
Gian van Veen 98.07	4
**Gerwyn Price 96.38**	**6**
**Luke Humphries 110.98**	**6**
Luke Littler 99.86	3

**Final**
Gerwyn Price 95.44	4
**Luke Humphries 100.16**	**6**

Night 15 Statistics
Night's Total Average: **98.26**
Highest Checkout: Luke Littler **136**
Most 180s: Luke Humphries **13**
Night's 180s: **41**

=== 21 May – Night 16 ===
(England) **Sheffield Arena, Sheffield**

**Quarter-finals**
2	Jonny Clayton 104.90	3
**7**	**Stephen Bunting 102.22**	**6**
**3**	**Gerwyn Price 105.97**	**6**
6	Gian van Veen 95.38	2
**1**	**Luke Littler 87.89**	**6**
8	Josh Rock 89.43	5
**4**	**Luke Humphries 105.24**	**6**
5	Michael van Gerwen 100.66	5

**Semi-finals**
**7**	**Stephen Bunting 98.98**	**6**
3	Gerwyn Price 93.43	3
1	Luke Littler 95.97	1
**4**	**Luke Humphries 100.82**	**6**

**Final**
**7**	**Stephen Bunting 106.37**	**6**
4	Luke Humphries 102.23	3

Night 16 Statistics
Night's Total Average: **98.73**
Highest Checkout: Stephen Bunting **161**
Most 180s: Stephen Bunting **13**
Night's 180s: **46**

== 28 May – Play-offs ==
The top four players of the league stage contested the play-offs to decide the champion of the Premier League.

(England) The O_{2}, London

	Score	
Semi-finals (best of 19 legs)
Luke Littler 98.47	10–9	Gerwyn Price 100.42
Jonny Clayton 95.86	9–10	Luke Humphries 96.16
Final (best of 21 legs)
Luke Littler 111.67	11–10	Luke Humphries 105.60
Night's Total Average: 101.33
Highest Checkout: Gerwyn Price 137
Most 180s: Luke Littler 20
Night's 180s: 45

== Standings ==
Five points were awarded for a night win, three points for the runner-up and two points for the losing semi-finalists. When players are tied on points, nights won is used first as a tie-breaker, followed by overall matches won.

The top four players after 16 nights advanced to the play-offs.

Pos	Name	Nights					Matches			Legs				Scoring						
Pos	Name	Pts	W	RU	SF	QF	Pld	W	L	LF	LA	LD	LWAT	100+	140+	180	A	HC	CR	C%
1	Luke Littler (C)	43	6	1	5	4	34	24	10	178	149	29	58	84	167	121	99.93	170	178/429	41.49%
2	Jonny Clayton	34	4	2	4	6	32	20	12	154	139	15	53	95	226	88	97.55	170	154/344	44.77%
3	Luke Humphries (RU)	27	1	4	5	6	31	16	15	148	141	7	47	92	204	98	101.20	164	148/389	38.05%
4	Gerwyn Price	26	2	2	5	7	29	15	14	140	130	10	55	75	136	82	98.51	170	140/323	43.34%
5	Stephen Bunting	18	2	0	4	10	24	10	14	106	112	–6	33	104	165	73	98.49	167	106/303	34.98%
6	Michael van Gerwen	18	1	3	2	10	25	10	15	113	121	–8	46	78	140	73	97.24	170	113/290	38.97%
7	Gian van Veen	18	0	4	3	9	27	11	16	115	136	–21	36	139	146	60	96.02	167	115/270	42.59%
8	Josh Rock	8	0	0	4	12	20	4	16	71	107	–36	22	46	92	59	93.91	164	71/232	30.60%

(C) Champion
(RU) Runner-up
(E) Eliminated
(Q) Qualified

== Streaks ==
Player	Nights																
Player	1	2	3	4	5	6	7	8	9	10	11	12	13	14	15	16	Play-offs
Luke Littler	QF	SF		QF	W	SF	W		QF		RU	W			SF		W
Jonny Clayton	SF		W	SF	RU	W	QF			W		RU	QF	SF	QF		SF
Luke Humphries	SF	QF	SF	QF	SF	RU	SF	QF			SF	QF	RU		W	RU	RU
Gerwyn Price	QF	W	QF	SF		QF	RU	SF	W	QF			SF	QF	RU	SF	SF
Stephen Bunting	QF			W	QF	SF	QF		SF		QF			SF	QF	W	DNQ
Michael van Gerwen	W	RU	WD	QF			SF	RU	QF	RU	QF	SF	QF				DNQ
Gian van Veen	RU	QF	RU		QF		WD	QF	RU	QF		SF		QF	SF	QF	DNQ
Josh Rock	QF							SF				QF					DNQ

Legend:	DNQ	Did not qualify	WD	withdrew	QF	Lost in Quarterfinals	SF	Semi-finalist	RU	Runner-up	W	Night winner

== Positions by week ==
Player	Nights															
Player	1	2	3	4	5	6	7	8	9	10	11	12	13	14	15	16
Luke Littler	6	5	6	7	3	2		1		2			1			
Jonny Clayton	3		1					2	3	1			2			
Luke Humphries	4	6	5	6		5	4	5	6	7	5	6		4		3
Gerwyn Price	5	2	4		2	3			2	3						4
Stephen Bunting	8	7		5	7					6	7					5
Michael van Gerwen	1		2	3	5	6	5	4						5		6
Gian van Veen	2	4	3	2	4		6		5		6	5		6		7
Josh Rock	7	8														
