= 2026 Austrian Darts Open =

Darts tournament

2026 Elten Safety Shoes Austrian Darts Open

Tournament information
- Dates: 8–10 May 2026
- Venue: Stadthalle Graz
- Location: Graz, Austria
- Organisation(s): Professional Darts Corporation (PDC)
- Format: Legs
- Prize fund: £230,000
- Winner's share: £35,000
- Nine-dart finish: Cristo Reyes
- High checkout: 170; Luke Woodhouse; Kevin Doets; Cristo Reyes; Josh Rock

Champion(s)
- Josh Rock (NIR)

The 2026 Austrian Darts Open (known for sponsorship reasons as the 2026 Elten Safety Shoes Austrian Darts Open) was a professional darts tournament that took place at the Stadthalle Graz in Graz, Austria, from 8 to 10 May 2026. It was the sixth of fifteen PDC European Tour events on the 2026 PDC Pro Tour. It featured a field of 48 players and £230,000 in prize money, with £35,000 going to the winner.

Martin Schindler was the defending champion, having defeated Ross Smith 8–4 in the 2025 final. However, he lost 6–2 to Daryl Gurney in the quarter-finals. Cristo Reyes hit a nine-dart finish in his second-round win against Damon Heta.

Josh Rock won his second European Tour title by defeating Kevin Doets 8–6 in the final, having survived three missed match darts from Niko Springer in the third round.

== Prize money ==
As part of a mass boost in prize money for Professional Darts Corporation (PDC) events in 2026, the prize fund for all 2026 European Tour events rose to £230,000, of which the winner receives £35,000.

Stage (num. of players)		Prize money
Winner	(1)	£35,000
Runner-up	(1)	£15,000
Semi-finalists	(2)	£10,000
Quarter-finalists	(4)	£8,000
Third round losers	(8)	£5,000
Second round losers	(16)	£3,500*
First round losers	(16)	£2,000*
Total	£230,000	

- Pre-qualified players from the Orders of Merit who lose in their first match of the event shall not be credited with prize money on any Order of Merit.

== Qualification and format ==
The top 16 players on the two-year PDC Order of Merit were seeded and entered the tournament in the second round, while the next 16 highest-ranked players from the one-year PDC Pro Tour Order of Merit automatically qualified for the first round. The seedings were confirmed on 27 March. The remaining 16 places went to players from four qualifying events – 10 from the Tour Card Holder Qualifier (held on 1 April), four from the Host Nation Qualifier (held on 7 May), one from the Nordic & Baltic Associate Member Qualifier (held on 30 March), and one from the East European Associate Member Qualifier (held on 11 April).

Jonny Clayton withdrew and was replaced by Madars Razma. In Clayton's place, Daryl Gurney moved up to become the 16th seed.

Seeded players

1. Gian van Veen (NED) (second round)
2. Michael van Gerwen (NED) (third round)
3. James Wade (ENG) (third round)
4. Josh Rock (NIR) (champion)
5. Danny Noppert (NED) (third round)
6. Ryan Searle (ENG) (second round)
7. Chris Dobey (ENG) (second round)
8. Ross Smith (ENG) (third round)
9. Martin Schindler (GER) (quarter-finals)
10. Jermaine Wattimena (NED) (second round)
11. Mike De Decker (BEL) (second round)
12. Damon Heta (AUS) (second round)
13. Wessel Nijman (NED) (second round)
14. Luke Woodhouse (ENG) (quarter-finals)
15. Rob Cross (ENG) (semi-finals)
16. Daryl Gurney (NIR) (semi-finals)

PDC Pro Tour Order of Merit qualifiers
- Dirk van Duijvenbode (NED) (first round)
- Cameron Menzies (SCO) (first round)
- Niels Zonneveld (NED) (second round)
- Niko Springer (GER) (third round)
- Krzysztof Ratajski (POL) (second round)
- William O'Connor (IRL) (second round)
- Ryan Joyce (ENG) (third round)
- Dave Chisnall (ENG) (first round)
- Andrew Gilding (ENG) (quarter-finals)
- Joe Cullen (ENG) (first round)
- Karel Sedláček (CZE) (first round)
- Kevin Doets (NED) (runner-up)
- Peter Wright (SCO) (second round)
- Ricardo Pietreczko (GER) (first round)
- Raymond van Barneveld (NED) (first round)

Tour Card qualifier
- Robert Owen (WAL) (second round)
- Michael Smith (ENG) (first round)
- James Hurrell (ENG) (first round)
- Ian White (ENG) (second round)
- Nick Kenny (WAL) (first round)
- Chris Landman (NED) (first round)
- Cristo Reyes (ESP) (quarter-finals)
- Gabriel Clemens (GER) (first round)
- Alan Soutar (SCO) (second round)
- Kim Huybrechts (BEL) (third round round)
Host Nation qualifier
- Nick Zwittnigg (AUT) (first round)
- Aaron Hardy (AUT) (first round)
- Zoran Lerchbacher (AUT) (first round)
- Mensur Suljović (AUT) (second round)
Nordic & Baltic qualifier
- Anton Östlund (SWE) (first round)
East European qualifier
- Patrik Kovács (HUN) (second round)
Reserve list
- Madars Razma (LAT) (third round)

== Summary ==
=== First round ===
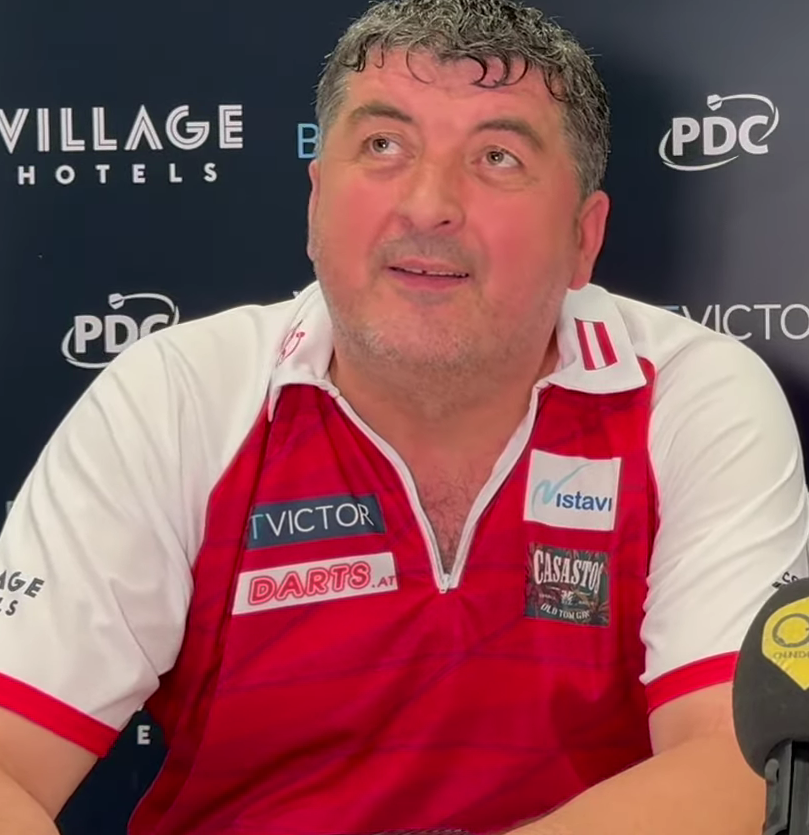
Mensur Suljović (pictured in 2024) was the only victorious Austrian player in the first round. He defeated Cameron Menzies 6–2.

The first round (best of 11 legs) was played on 8 May. Austria's Mensur Suljović, one of four host nation qualifiers, won his opening match 6–2 against Cameron Menzies, hitting 75 per cent of his attempts at double. Speaking after the match, he thanked his home crowd and called them "my family". The three other host nation qualifiers were eliminated: Zoran Lerchbacher was defeated 6–2 by two-time world champion Peter Wright, who claimed his first European Tour win of the season; debutant Nick Zwittnigg lost 6–4 to Andrew Gilding; and Aaron Hardy made his first European Tour appearance in 11 years, losing 6–3 to Krzysztof Ratajski. Alan Soutar beat five-time world champion Raymond van Barneveld 6–2, while Ian White defeated the 2023 world champion Michael Smith 6–4. After winning his first ranking title at Players Championship 13 earlier in the week, Kevin Doets posted a three-dart average of 99.35 in his 6–3 victory over Chris Landman.

Despite an average of 100.19, the only ton-plus average of the first round, Dirk van Duijvenbode lost 6–4 to reserve player Madars Razma. Niko Springer landed a 167 checkout, one of his three ton-plus finishes, during his 6–3 victory against Nick Kenny. Kim Huybrechts helped his chances of qualifying for the World Matchplay by defeating Karel Sedláček 6–3. Niels Zonneveld triumphed in a deciding leg against James Hurrell, sealing victory with a 135 checkout. Robert Owen also won a deciding leg, marking his first European Tour appearance of 2026 with a victory over Joe Cullen. Hungarian qualifier Patrik Kovács defeated Ricardo Pietreczko 6–4, while Spain's Cristo Reyes earned a 6–3 win against Dave Chisnall. Ryan Joyce and William O'Connor were 6–3 winners against Gabriel Clemens and Anton Östlund, respectively.

=== Second round ===
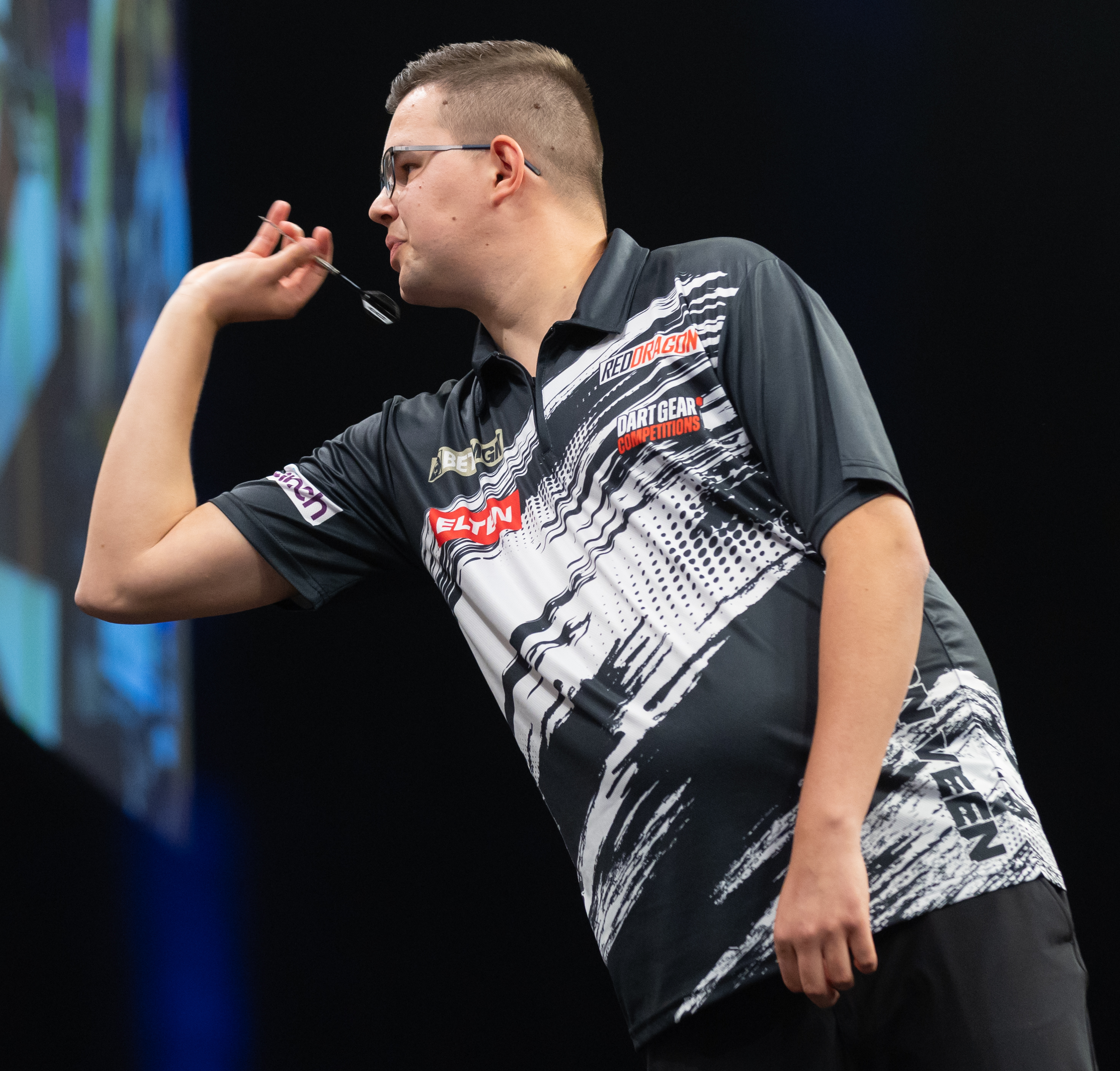
Top seed Gian van Veen (pictured in 2026) suffered a third consecutive opening-match defeat on the European Tour, losing 6–5 to Madars Razma.

The second round (best of 11 legs) was played on 9 May. Cristo Reyes hit his first nine-dart finish on stage in the fourth leg of his match against twelfth seed Damon Heta. Reyes went on to win the match 6–4, finishing with an average of 101.89 and six maximums. "When I hit the nine-darter I got more nervous, but this is amazing. I want to say thank you to this fantastic crowd," commented Reyes afterwards. Top seed Gian van Veen was eliminated in his opening match for the third straight European Tour event, losing a deciding leg to Madars Razma. Four-time Austrian Darts Open champion Michael van Gerwen averaged 103.41 in a 6–3 win over Krzysztof Ratajski; Van Gerwen progressed to a third-round meeting with the 2018 world champion Rob Cross, who defeated William O'Connor by the same scoreline. Defending champion Martin Schindler won five legs in a row to beat Peter Wright 6–2, while his German compatriot Niko Springer whitewashed thirteenth seed Wessel Nijman 6–0.

Alan Soutar missed three match darts to beat fifth seed Danny Noppert, who prevailed in a deciding leg. Kim Huybrechts was also a 6–5 winner, landing a 132 checkout on the bullseye to defeat seventh seed Chris Dobey. James Wade eliminated the final Austrian player left as he averaged 103.20 to beat Mensur Suljović 6–2, while Ryan Joyce inflicted a sixth consecutive European Tour defeat on eleventh seed Mike De Decker, winning 6–3. Northern Ireland's Josh Rock and Daryl Gurney earned 6–3 victories against Patrik Kovács and Ian White, respectively. Kevin Doets triumphed 6–2 to achieve his first career win against sixth seed Ryan Searle. Ross Smith, Luke Woodhouse, and Andrew Gilding recorded ton-plus averages in their respective victories over Niels Zonneveld, Robert Owen, and tenth seed Jermaine Wattimena.

=== Final day ===
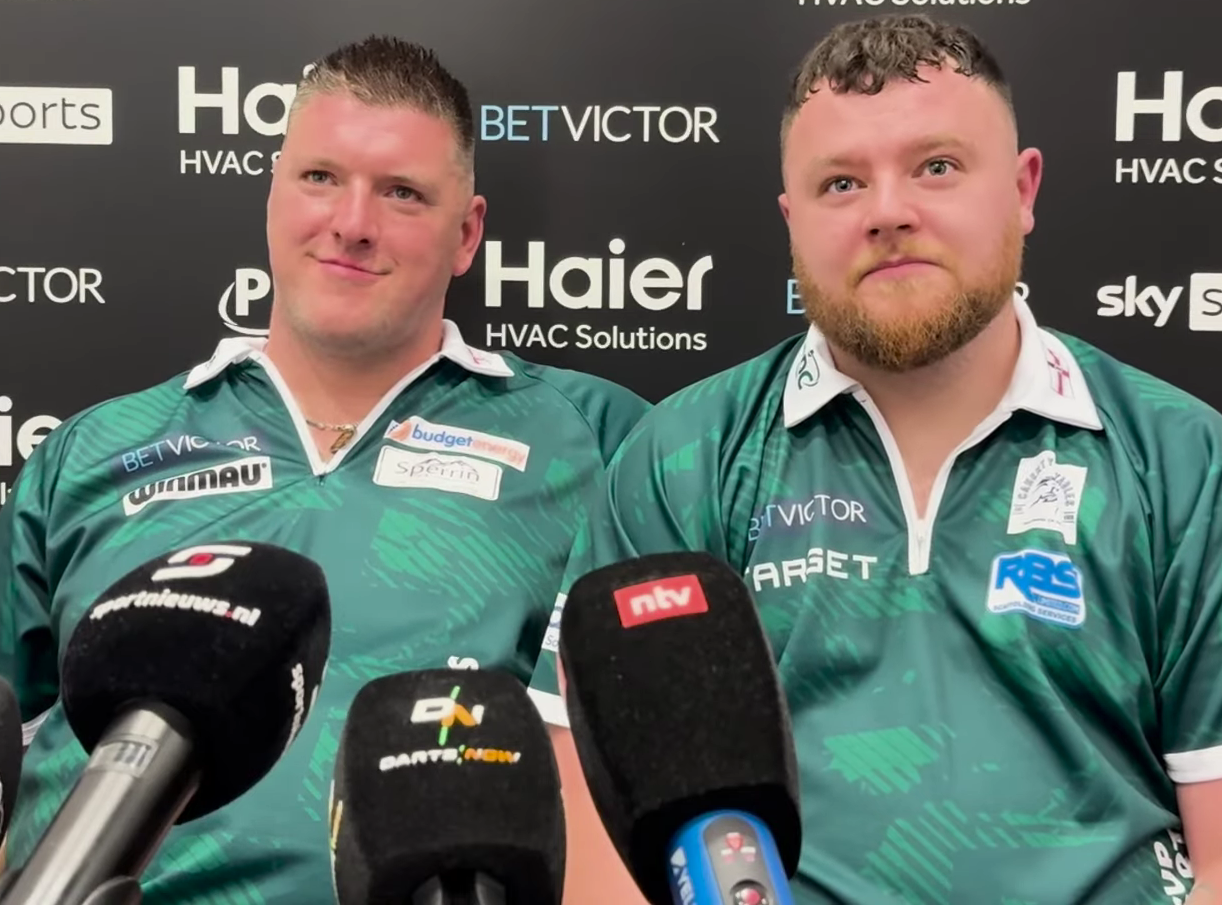
Northern Irish World Cup teammates Daryl Gurney (left) and Josh Rock (right) faced each other in the semi-finals. Rock won 7–3, later defeating Kevin Doets 8–6 in the final to win his second European Tour title.

The third round, quarter-finals, semi-finals and final were played on 10 May 2026. The third round and quarter-finals were contested over the best of 11 legs, the semi-finals over the best of 13 legs, and the final over the best of 15 legs. The final day saw Josh Rock and Kevin Doets reach the final. In the third round, Rock's match with Niko Springer went to a deciding leg, where both players bust their score by hitting the wrong double. Rock finally hit double 8 to prevail 6–5, having survived three missed match darts from Springer. Rock won his quarter-final 6–4 against Cristo Reyes, who hit a 170 checkout, then defeated his World Cup teammate Daryl Gurney 7–3 in the semi-finals. Following a 6–2 victory over Ryan Joyce, Doets averaged 112.31 and hit a 170 checkout on his way to beating Luke Woodhouse 6–3. He sealed a 7–3 semi-final win against Rob Cross with a 124 finish. Woodhouse also landed a 170 checkout during his victory against James Wade in the third round. Rock was looking to win the Austrian Darts Open for the first time after finishing as runner-up to Jonny Clayton at the 2023 edition, while Doets contested his maiden European Tour final.

The final began with four consecutive breaks of throw, halted by Doets achieving the match's first hold of throw in 11 darts to lead 3–2. Rock landed the tournament's fourth 170 checkout for another break to go 4–3 ahead. After Rock missed a dart at single 20 to leave a shot at double 20, Doets converted a 90 finish on double 5 to level the match at 6–6. Rock then capitalised on Doets missing an 80 checkout to lead as he found another break of throw, before a 60 finish completed an 8–6 win for the Northern Irishman. Both players finished the match with an average over 101.

Rock won his second European Tour title after his first triumph at the 2024 Dutch Darts Championship, becoming the sixth different winner in the first six European Tour events of the year. He was awarded the customary green jacket, traditionally given to the tournament's champion. The title win also meant that Rock rose to the top of the 2026 European Tour rankings. "I made my first final against Jonny [Clayton] here and when he got the jacket I was kind of jealous. Martin Schindler beat me last year in the semi and won it, so I was determined to win it this year. I'm happy I've finally got it," said Rock in his post-match interview. Calling back to golfer Rory McIlroy's win at the 2026 Masters Tournament, he added: "I'm just happy because two Northern Irishmen got a green jacket this year." Doets, who rose to number 33 in the PDC World Rankings, believed that Rock was the deserved winner. He explained his future ambitions by stating: "I want to be a regular in the Premier League and become a top eight, top four player in the world, or world champion one day—that's everyone's goal. We keep fighting for it."

== Draw ==
The draw was confirmed on 7 May. Numbers to the left of a player's name show the seedings for the top 16 in the tournament. The figures to the right of a player's name state their three-dart average in a match. The reserve player is indicated by 'Alt'. Players in bold denote match winners.

**First round** (best of 11 legs); 8 May
Dirk van Duijvenbode 100.19	4
**Alt**	**Madars Razma 98.76**	**6**
Michael Smith 88.67	4
**Ian White 89.88**	**6**
**Niels Zonneveld 93.70**	**6**
James Hurrell 94.08	5
**Peter Wright 90.16**	**6**
Zoran Lerchbacher 81.50	2
Ricardo Pietreczko 83.58	4
**Patrik Kovács 81.53**	**6**
**Niko Springer 87.70**	**6**
Nick Kenny 77.43	3
Raymond van Barneveld 77.79	2
**Alan Soutar 88.76**	**6**
Dave Chisnall 86.88	3
**Cristo Reyes 85.01**	**6**
**Krzysztof Ratajski 91.31**	**6**
(Austria) Aaron Hardy 81.99	3
**William O'Connor 94.16**	**6**
Anton Östlund 86.22	3
Karel Sedláček 92.07	3
**Kim Huybrechts 94.09**	**6**
**Andrew Gilding 80.37**	**6**
(Austria) Nick Zwittnigg 75.46	4
Cameron Menzies 90.21	2
**Mensur Suljović 94.19**	**6**
Joe Cullen 91.25	5
**Robert Owen 93.57**	**6**
**Kevin Doets 99.35**	**6**
Chris Landman 93.71	3
**Ryan Joyce 87.70**	**6**
Gabriel Clemens 90.36	3

**Second round** (best of 11 legs); 9 May
1	Gian van Veen 92.01	5
**Alt**	**Madars Razma 86.57**	**6**
**16**	**Daryl Gurney 97.67**	**6**
Ian White 94.59	3
**8**	**Ross Smith 102.02**	**6**
Niels Zonneveld 96.57	3
**9**	**Martin Schindler 90.89**	**6**
Peter Wright 82.42	2
**4**	**Josh Rock 93.51**	**6**
Patrik Kovács 89.59	3
13	Wessel Nijman 92.50	0
**Niko Springer 100.20**	**6**
**5**	**Danny Noppert 91.29**	**6**
Alan Soutar 89.19	5
12	Damon Heta 95.67	4
**Cristo Reyes 101.89**	**6**
**2**	**Michael van Gerwen 103.41**	**6**
Krzysztof Ratajski 99.07	3
**15**	**Rob Cross 97.49**	**6**
William O'Connor 99.73	3
7	Chris Dobey 99.97	5
**Kim Huybrechts 98.94**	**6**
10	Jermaine Wattimena 95.77	4
**Andrew Gilding 100.92**	**6**
**3**	**James Wade 103.20**	**6**
Mensur Suljović 91.01	2
**14**	**Luke Woodhouse 100.70**	**6**
Robert Owen 95.91	1
6	Ryan Searle 88.95	2
**Kevin Doets 91.55**	**6**
11	Mike De Decker 90.91	3
**Ryan Joyce 92.85**	**6**

**Third round** (best of 11 legs); 10 May
Alt	Razma 93.18	3
**16**	**Gurney 91.51**	**6**
8	R Smith 95.14	2
**9**	**Schindler 98.45**	**6**
**4**	**Rock 90.25**	**6**
Springer 90.40	5
5	Noppert 90.51	3
**Reyes 92.24**	**6**
2	van Gerwen 94.02	4
**15**	**Cross 93.38**	**6**
Huybrechts 83.53	5
**Gilding 86.76**	**6**
3	Wade 96.80	1
**14**	**Woodhouse 103.46**	**6**
**Doets 94.66**	**6**
Joyce 81.67	2

**Quarter-finals** (best of 11 legs); 10 May
**16**	**Gurney 95.69**	**6**
9	Schindler 95.45	2
**4**	**Rock 96.97**	**6**
Reyes 93.55	4
**15**	**Cross 93.92**	**6**
Gilding 88.57	1
14	Woodhouse 92.15	3
**Doets 112.31**	**6**

**Semi-finals** (best of 13 legs); 10 May
16	Gurney 85.97	3
**4**	**Rock 100.15**	**7**
15	Cross 96.90	3
**Doets 96.20**	**7**

**Final** (best of 15 legs); 10 May
**4**	**Rock 101.56**	**8**
Doets 101.20	6
