= 2026 Slovak Darts Open =

Darts tournament

2026 Niké Slovak Darts Open

Tournament information
- Dates: 19–21 June 2026
- Venue: Incheba
- Location: Bratislava, Slovakia
- Organisation(s): Professional Darts Corporation (PDC)
- Format: Legs
- Prize fund: £230,000
- Winner's share: £35,000
- High checkout: 170; Jonny Clayton; Wessel Nijman

Champion(s)
- Wessel Nijman (NED)

The 2026 Slovak Darts Open (known for sponsorship reasons as the 2026 Niké Slovak Darts Open) was a professional darts tournament that took place at the Incheba in Bratislava, Slovakia, from 19 to 21 June 2026. It was the ninth of fifteen PDC European Tour events on the 2026 PDC Pro Tour, and the first PDC event to be held in Slovakia. It featured a field of 48 players and £230,000 in prize money, with £35,000 going to the winner.

Wessel Nijman won his second European Tour title, defeating Rob Cross 8–3 in the final to become the tournament's inaugural champion.

== Prize money ==
As part of a mass boost in prize money for Professional Darts Corporation (PDC) events in 2026, the prize fund for all 2026 European Tour events rose to £230,000, of which the winner will receive £35,000.

| Stage (num. of players) | | Prize money |
|---|---|---|
| Winner | (1) | £35,000 |
| Runner-up | (1) | £15,000 |
| Semi-finalists | (2) | £10,000 |
| Quarter-finalists | (4) | £8,000 |
| Third round losers | (8) | £5,000 |
| Second round losers | (16) | £3,500* |
| First round losers | (16) | £2,000* |
| Total | £230,000 | |

- Pre-qualified players from the Orders of Merit who lose in their first match of the event shall not be credited with prize money on any Order of Merit.

== Qualification and format ==
The top 16 players on the two-year PDC Order of Merit were seeded and entered the tournament in the second round, while the next 16 highest-ranked players from the one-year PDC Pro Tour Order of Merit automatically qualified for the first round. The seedings were confirmed on 13 May. The remaining 16 places went to players from four qualifying events – 10 from the Tour Card Holder Qualifier (held on 20 May), four from the Host Nation Qualifier (held on 18 June), one from the Nordic & Baltic Associate Member Qualifier (held on 24 April), and one from the East European Associate Member Qualifier (held on 11 April).

Before the Tour Card Holder Qualifier, James Wade withdrew and was replaced by Dave Chisnall. Before the draw for the tournament, Gary Anderson withdrew and was replaced by Madars Razma. Luke Woodhouse and Damon Heta moved up to become the 15th and 16th seed, respectively.

Seeded players

1. Gian van Veen (NED) (second round)
2. Michael van Gerwen (NED) (third round)
3. Jonny Clayton (WAL) (second round)
4. Gerwyn Price (WAL) (second round)
5. Danny Noppert (NED) (third round)
6. Stephen Bunting (ENG) (third round)
7. Chris Dobey (ENG) (third round)
8. Ryan Searle (ENG) (third round)
9. Nathan Aspinall (ENG) (quarter-finals)
10. Ross Smith (ENG) (semi-finals)
11. Wessel Nijman (NED) (champion)
12. Jermaine Wattimena (NED) (quarter-finals)
13. Martin Schindler (GER) (second round)
14. Mike De Decker (BEL) (quarter-finals)
15. Luke Woodhouse (ENG) (second round)
16. Damon Heta (AUS) (second round)

PDC Pro Tour Order of Merit qualifiers
- Kevin Doets (NED) (third round)
- Niko Springer (GER) (first round)
- Dirk van Duijvenbode (NED) (first round)
- Krzysztof Ratajski (POL) (second round)
- Niels Zonneveld (NED) (second round)
- Daryl Gurney (NIR) (first round)
- William O'Connor (IRL) (second round)
- Andrew Gilding (ENG) (quarter-finals)
- Joe Cullen (ENG) (second round)
- Cameron Menzies (SCO) (third round)
- Ryan Joyce (ENG) (third round)
- Karel Sedláček (CZE) (first round)
- Rob Cross (ENG) (runner-up)
- Kim Huybrechts (BEL) (second round)
- Dave Chisnall (ENG) (second round)

Tour Card qualifier
- Mervyn King (ENG) (first round)
- Owen Bates (ENG) (first round)
- Benjamin Pratnemer (SLO) (second round)
- Jim Long (CAN) (second round)
- Keane Barry (IRL) (first round)
- Tyler Thorpe (ENG) (second round)
- Justin Hood (ENG) (first round)
- Tom Sykes (ENG) (semi-finals)
- Jeffrey de Graaf (SWE) (first round)
- Cristo Reyes (ESP) (first round)
Host Nation qualifier
- Gabriel Váraljay (SVK) (first round)
- Juraj Holub (SVK) (first round)
- Adrián Dudek (SVK) (first round)
- Ján Sliacky (SVK) (first round)
Nordic & Baltic qualifier
- Johan Engström (SWE) (first round)
East European qualifier
- Péter Kelemen (HUN) (first round)
Reserve list
- Madars Razma (LAT) (second round)

== Summary ==
=== First round ===
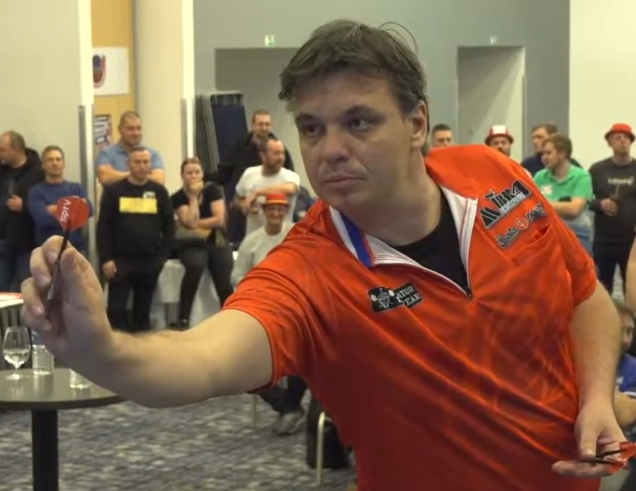
Benjamin Pratnemer (pictured in 2022) defeated Justin Hood 6–5 in the first round, having trailed his opponent 4–1.

The first round (best of 11 legs) was played on 19 June. The 2025 Hungarian Darts Trophy champion Niko Springer faced European Tour debutant Tom Sykes, who recorded a three-dart average of 103.64 and hit a 148 checkout on his way to defeating Springer 6–2. Two other players earned their first win on the European Tour, as Jim Long and Tyler Thorpe defeated Daryl Gurney and Karel Sedláček, respectively. "I love the attention, the crowd, all the noise. It's completely different to anything," commented Thorpe, who averaged 103.30 during his win. The four Slovak qualifiers were eliminated in the first round: Ján Sliacky, the first Slovak player to compete on the European Tour, lost 6–1 to Niels Zonneveld; Adrián Dudek landed a 150 checkout but was beaten in a deciding leg by Dave Chisnall; Juraj Holub lost 6–3 to 2018 world champion Rob Cross; and Gabriel Váraljay suffered a 6–1 defeat to Cameron Menzies. Madars Razma converted a 154 finish on his way to beating Dirk van Duijvenbode 6–4, while Kim Huybrechts hit five maximums as he defeated Keane Barry by the same scoreline.

Hungarian qualifier Péter Kelemen, another European Tour debutant, lost 6–3 to Joe Cullen. Kevin Doets averaged 102.49 in his own 6–3 victory over Owen Bates. William O'Connor and Ryan Joyce were also 6–3 winners, earning respective victories against Swedish players Jeffrey de Graaf and Johan Engström. Andrew Gilding secured a 6–4 win over Mervyn King, who made his first European Tour appearance in over two years. Benjamin Pratnemer initially trailed Justin Hood 4–1, but won the next four legs to take a 5–4 lead; they went to a deciding leg, where Pratnemer won the match 6–5. Krzysztof Ratajski beat Cristo Reyes 6–2 in the round's final match.

=== Second round ===
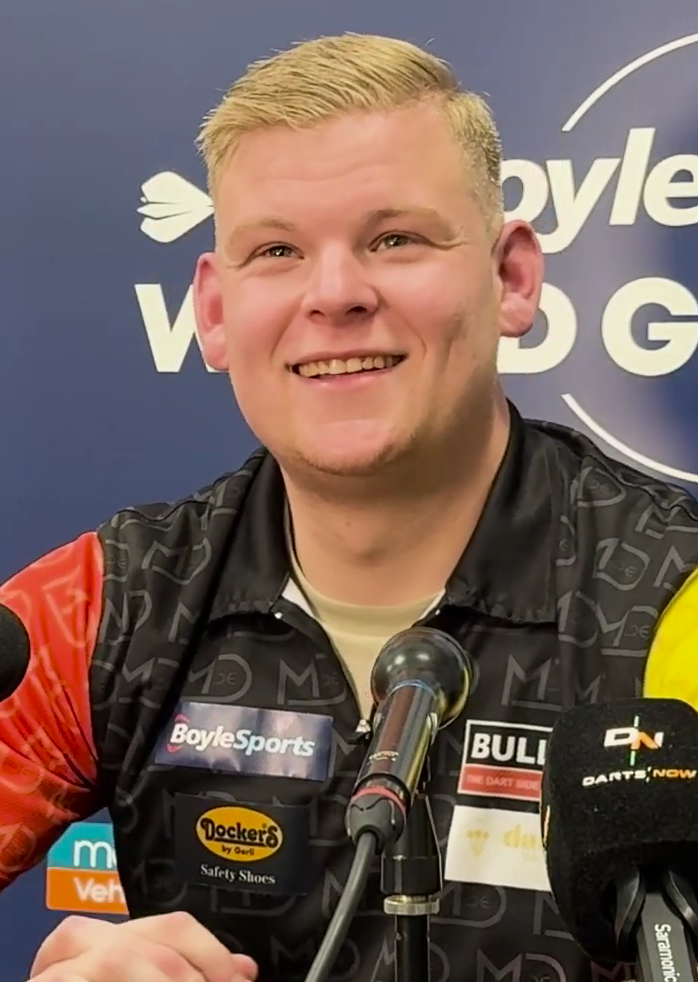
Mike De Decker (pictured in 2024) ended an eight-match losing streak on the European Tour with a 6–2 victory over William O'Connor.

The second round (best of 11 legs) was played on 20 June. Cameron Menzies registered a three-dart average of 106 to defeat fourth seed and 2021 world champion Gerwyn Price 6–2. Menzies admitted to being nervous in his post-match interview but said that hitting trebles with his first dart in hand helped him win. He also expressed his love for the host city Bratislava and added that he hoped to come back. Mike De Decker earned his first win on the European Tour since the first event of the season, the Poland Darts Open, by beating William O'Connor 6–2 with an average of 107.14. Top seed Gian van Veen was eliminated in a 6–3 defeat to Rob Cross. Three-time world champion Michael van Gerwen led 4–1 against Krzysztof Ratajski but missed a total of seven match darts, eventually hitting his eighth to complete a 6–5 win. Similarly, Niels Zonneveld staged a comeback from 5–2 down against Stephen Bunting, who missed seven match darts of his own before prevailing by the same scoreline. In two other last-leg deciders, Ross Smith overturned a 4–2 deficit to defeat Joe Cullen, while Ryan Joyce eliminated third seed Jonny Clayton, who hit a 170 checkout during the match.

Tom Sykes continues his run, defeating thirteenth seed Martin Schindler in a deciding leg. "I never give up, I never will, I'll always be there or thereabouts, so we'll carry onto tomorrow and see what happens," commented Sykes afterwards. Four Dutch players were victorious during the round's afternoon session, joining compatriot Van Gerwen in the third round: Kevin Doets, Wessel Nijman, and Danny Noppert earned respective 6–2 wins against sixteenth seed Damon Heta, Benjamin Pratnemer, and Madars Razma, while Jermaine Wattimena defeated Dave Chisnall 6–3. Fifteenth seed and recent Baltic Sea Darts Open champion Luke Woodhouse was beaten 6–4 by Andrew Gilding. Ryan Searle and Nathan Aspinall set up a tie against each other in the third round with their wins over Kim Huybrechts and Jim Long, while Chris Dobey ended the run of Tyler Thorpe with a 6–4 victory.

=== Final day ===
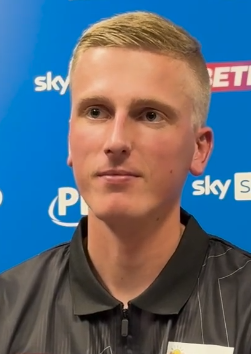
Wessel Nijman (pictured in 2025) won the inaugural Slovak Darts Open, his second European Tour title.

The third round, quarter-finals, semi-finals and final were played on 21 June. The third round and quarter-finals were contested over the best of 11 legs, the semi-finals over the best of 13 legs, and the final over the best of 15 legs. The final day saw Rob Cross and Wessel Nijman reach the final. Cross began the day by winning a deciding leg against Kevin Doets, followed by a 6–2 victory over Nathan Aspinall in the quarter-finals, marking his first win against his English compatriot in 10 matches. Cross advanced to the final with a 7–2 win against Tom Sykes, who became the eighth player to reach the semi-finals of their maiden European Tour event. Nijman's run started with a 6–1 win over Stephen Bunting and a 6–3 win over Mike De Decker, the latter featuring a 170 checkout and 104.50 average from the victorious Dutchman. He initially led 5–2 against Ross Smith in the semi-finals, but Smith recovered to take the match to a deciding leg, where Nijman converted a 161 checkout to complete a 7–6 victory. Nijman and Cross entered the tournament as the respective winners of Players Championship 21 and Players Championship 22 earlier in the week. Cross was aiming to win his third European Tour title in his first final in over two years, while Nijman was looking to win his second European Tour title of the year.

Nijman converted a 104 checkout to win the opening leg of the final. Cross found the match's first break of throw to go 2–1 ahead, but Nijman broke back and completed a run of four consecutive legs to establish a 5–2 lead, including a 116 finish. Cross was able to win the next leg to cut the gap to 5–3. Nijman avoided dropping another leg, breaking his opponent's throw in 12 darts to claim the penultimate leg before hitting a 74 checkout in the next to secure an 8–3 victory. Nijman ended the match with a three-dart average of 103.80, compared to Cross' 102.57.

Nijman became the inaugural Slovak Darts Open champion, winning his second European Tour title after his first at the 2026 European Darts Trophy in March. It was his eighth ranking title of 2026 and his 11th PDC ranking title overall. He became the fourth player to claim at least eight Pro Tour titles in a single season, after Phil Taylor, Michael van Gerwen, and Peter Wright. He also became the first multiple-time champion of the 2026 European Tour season. His title win placed him at the top of the 2026 European Tour rankings and saw him rise to a new career-high ranking of world number 14 in the PDC World Rankings. "Sometimes you have those days where you feel this can be a winning day because you feel so confident and today was a day like that," said Nijman after the match. He added that despite the absences of players like Luke Littler and Luke Humphries, the tournament still showcased the high level of PDC darts. Cross commended his opponent's performance and showed his appreciation for the Bratislava crowd. Discussing his form, he said: "I wouldn't say I'm at my peak at the minute, but I'm starting to get there. I won a title in the week, another final today, and this was good practice for the World Matchplay."

== Draw ==
The draw was announced on 18 June. Numbers to the left of a player's name show the seedings for the top 16 in the tournament. The figures to the right of a player's name state their three-dart average in a match. The reserve player is indicated by 'Alt'. Players in bold denote match winners.

**First round** (best of 11 legs); 19 June
**Rob Cross 82.99** | **6**
(Slovakia) Juraj Holub 78.37 | 3
**Kevin Doets 102.49** | **6**
Owen Bates 90.94 | 3
**Kim Huybrechts 95.75** | **6**
Keane Barry 86.14 | 4
Daryl Gurney 89.33 | 1
**Jim Long 96.31** | **6**
**Cameron Menzies 78.74** | **6**
(Slovakia) Gabriel Váraljay 70.70 | 1
Niko Springer 96.79 | 2
**Tom Sykes 103.64** | **6**
Dirk van Duijvenbode 93.18 | 4
**Alt** | **Madars Razma 90.83** | **6**
**Dave Chisnall 88.85** | **6**
(Slovakia) Adrián Dudek 74.88 | 5
**Krzysztof Ratajski 94.32** | **6**
Cristo Reyes 91.01 | 2
**Andrew Gilding 91.50** | **6**
Mervyn King 90.51 | 4
Karel Sedláček 93.74 | 2
**Tyler Thorpe 103.30** | **6**
**Joe Cullen 92.83** | **6**
Péter Kelemen 86.64 | 3
**Ryan Joyce 88.49** | **6**
Johan Engström 89.00 | 3
**William O'Connor 90.36** | **6**
Jeffrey de Graaf 88.91 | 3
**Niels Zonneveld 80.01** | **6**
(Slovakia) Ján Sliacky 68.91 | 1
Justin Hood 84.57 | 5
**Benjamin Pratnemer 84.62** | **6**

**Second round** (best of 11 legs); 20 June
1 | Gian van Veen 93.68 | 3
**Rob Cross 98.36** | **6**
16 | Damon Heta 89.21 | 2
**Kevin Doets 95.10** | **6**
**8** | **Ryan Searle 89.78** | **6**
Kim Huybrechts 83.21 | 3
**9** | **Nathan Aspinall 90.99** | **6**
Jim Long 87.06 | 4
4 | Gerwyn Price 96.74 | 2
**Cameron Menzies 106.00** | **6**
13 | Martin Schindler 90.73 | 5
**Tom Sykes 94.60** | **6**
**5** | **Danny Noppert 81.45** | **6**
Alt | Madars Razma 79.30 | 2
**12** | **Jermaine Wattimena 93.46** | **6**
Dave Chisnall 88.81 | 3
**2** | **Michael van Gerwen 92.52** | **6**
Krzysztof Ratajski 86.18 | 5
15 | Luke Woodhouse 85.33 | 4
**Andrew Gilding 94.14** | **6**
**7** | **Chris Dobey 90.75** | **6**
Tyler Thorpe 91.78 | 4
**10** | **Ross Smith 92.03** | **6**
Joe Cullen 96.63 | 5
3 | Jonny Clayton 94.66 | 5
**Ryan Joyce 95.41** | **6**
**14** | **Mike De Decker 107.14** | **6**
William O'Connor 86.18 | 2
**6** | **Stephen Bunting 96.35** | **6**
Niels Zonneveld 98.53 | 5
**11** | **Wessel Nijman 91.45** | **6**
Benjamin Pratnemer 88.55 | 2

**Third round** (best of 11 legs); 21 June
**Cross 95.30** | **6**
Doets 96.91 | 5
8 | Searle 99.85 | 0
**9** | **Aspinall 108.65** | **6**
Menzies 90.34 | 4
**Sykes 94.71** | **6**
5 | Noppert 93.07 | 5
**12** | **Wattimena 90.25** | **6**
2 | van Gerwen 98.16 | 4
**Gilding 103.51** | **6**
7 | Dobey 92.89 | 4
**10** | **Smith 104.57** | **6**
Joyce 90.36 | 5
**14** | **De Decker 93.07** | **6**
6 | Bunting 93.73 | 1
**11** | **Nijman 98.88** | **6**

**Quarter-finals** (best of 11 legs); 21 June
**Cross 102.75** | **6**
9 | Aspinall 96.22 | 2
**Sykes 89.28** | **6**
12 | Wattimena 84.35 | 2
Gilding 82.79 | 4
**10** | **Smith 88.71** | **6**
14 | De Decker 97.56 | 3
**11** | **Nijman 104.50** | **6**

**Semi-finals** (best of 13 legs); 21 June
**Cross 98.13** | **7**
Sykes 90.72 | 2
10 | Smith 96.73 | 6
**11** | **Nijman 98.63** | **7**

**Final** (best of 15 legs); 21 June
Cross 102.57 | 3
**11** | **Nijman 103.80** | **8**
