= 2026 Grand Slam of Darts =

2026 Mr Vegas Grand Slam of Darts

Tournament information
- Dates: 14–22 November 2026
- Venue: WV Active Aldersley
- Location: Wolverhampton, England
- Organisation(s): Professional Darts Corporation (PDC)
- Format: Legs
- Prize fund: £1,000,000
- Winner's share: £200,000
- Nine-dart finish: Michael van Gerwen; Tom Sykes
- High checkout: 170; Joe Hunt; Nathan Aspinall; Kevin Doets (×2); Tom Sykes

Champion(s)
- Gerwyn Price

The 2026 Grand Slam of Darts (known for sponsorship reasons as the 2026 Mr Vegas Grand Slam of Darts) was a professional darts tournament that took place from 14 to 22 November 2026 at the WV Active Aldersley in Wolverhampton, England. It was the 20th staging of the Grand Slam of Darts by the Professional Darts Corporation (PDC). The winner received £200,000 from a total prize fund of £1,000,000.

The tournament featured 48 players, expanded from 32. Finalists from televised tournaments, PDC Pro Tour title winners, and additional qualifiers comprised the first 38 places, being joined by 10 Tour Card holder qualifiers.

Luke Littler was the defending champion, having defeated Luke Humphries 16–11 in the 2025 final, but he lost to Jermaine Wattimena 10-8 in the second round.

Gerwyn Price won the tournament for the fourth time beating Gian van Veen 16-11 in the final, having previously survived 2 match darts in the quarter-finals against Niko Springer.

== Overview ==
=== Background ===
The 2026 Grand Slam of Darts was the 20th edition of the tournament to be staged by the Professional Darts Corporation (PDC) since the inaugural edition in 2007. First held at the Wolverhampton Civic Hall, the tournament originally involved top darts players from both the PDC and its rival, the British Darts Organisation (BDO). PDC chairman Barry Hearn promoted it as an event "to discover the greatest of them all". The tournament was mostly dominated by PDC representatives with the exception of the 2010 event, where Scott Waites became the first and only BDO player to win the title by overturning an 8–0 deficit to defeat James Wade 16–12 in the final. Following the dissolution of the BDO in 2020, the 2021 event was the first edition to not feature representatives from the organisation, being replaced by additional qualifiers from the PDC's feeder systems.

The 2026 edition was held from 14 to 22 November 2026 at the WV Active Aldersley in Wolverhampton, England. Online casino Mr Vegas, owned by Malta-based gambling company Videoslots, continued its sponsorship of the event. It was the first edition of the tournament to feature a 48-player field, having previously consisted of 32 players. Luke Littler entered the tournament as defending champion, having defeated Luke Humphries 16–11 in the 2025 final to win his second Grand Slam title; the 2025 event also saw Littler overtake Humphries to become the new world number one.

=== Format ===
All matches were in leg play format. The 48 players were drawn into 16 groups of 3, with each group containing one seeded player. The groups were contested on a round-robin basis where every player faced each other once. Players earned two points for a win and the top player in each group qualified for the knockout stage.

=== Prize money ===
The total prize fund for the event increased from £650,000 in 2025 to £1,000,000 in 2026. The winner received £200,000 and the Eric Bristow Trophy, renamed in 2018 in honour of the five-time world champion who died in April the same year. The prize money breakdown was:

Position (num. of players)		Prize money (Total: £1,000,000)
Winner	(1)	£200,000
Runner-up	(1)	£100,000
Semi-finalists	(2)	£60,000
Quarter-finalists	(4)	£35,000
Last 16	(8)	£20,000
Second in group	(16)	£12,500
Third in group	(16)	£5,000

== Qualification ==
Coinciding with the expansion to 48 players, the qualification criteria for the tournament were announced on 11 February 2026. The first 40 participants were decided by the following criteria:

- Finalists from PDC televised events over the previous twelve months (up to a maximum of 24 players)
- Additional qualifiers (up to a maximum of 12 players)
- European Tour events winners (to fill up to 40 players)
- Players Championship event winners (to fill up to 40 players)

The list of qualifiers were invited in the following order:

=== Televised finalists ===
Tournament	Year	Position	Player	Qualifiers
PDC World Darts Championship	2026	Winner	Luke Littler (ENG)	Luke Littler (ENG); Luke Humphries (ENG); Ross Smith (ENG); Gian van Veen (NED); Gerwyn Price (WAL); James Wade (ENG); Nathan Aspinall (ENG); Michael van Gerwen (NED); Martin Schindler (GER)
Grand Slam of Darts	2025	Winner	Luke Littler (ENG)	Luke Littler (ENG); Luke Humphries (ENG); Ross Smith (ENG); Gian van Veen (NED); Gerwyn Price (WAL); James Wade (ENG); Nathan Aspinall (ENG); Michael van Gerwen (NED); Martin Schindler (GER)
Premier League Darts	2026	Winner	Luke Littler (ENG)	Luke Littler (ENG); Luke Humphries (ENG); Ross Smith (ENG); Gian van Veen (NED); Gerwyn Price (WAL); James Wade (ENG); Nathan Aspinall (ENG); Michael van Gerwen (NED); Martin Schindler (GER)
World Matchplay	2026	Winner	Luke Littler (ENG)	Luke Littler (ENG); Luke Humphries (ENG); Ross Smith (ENG); Gian van Veen (NED); Gerwyn Price (WAL); James Wade (ENG); Nathan Aspinall (ENG); Michael van Gerwen (NED); Martin Schindler (GER)
World Grand Prix	2026	Winner	Luke Humphries (ENG)	Luke Littler (ENG); Luke Humphries (ENG); Ross Smith (ENG); Gian van Veen (NED); Gerwyn Price (WAL); James Wade (ENG); Nathan Aspinall (ENG); Michael van Gerwen (NED); Martin Schindler (GER)
World Masters	2026	Winner	Luke Littler (ENG)	Luke Littler (ENG); Luke Humphries (ENG); Ross Smith (ENG); Gian van Veen (NED); Gerwyn Price (WAL); James Wade (ENG); Nathan Aspinall (ENG); Michael van Gerwen (NED); Martin Schindler (GER)
UK Open	2026	Winner	Luke Littler (ENG)	Luke Littler (ENG); Luke Humphries (ENG); Ross Smith (ENG); Gian van Veen (NED); Gerwyn Price (WAL); James Wade (ENG); Nathan Aspinall (ENG); Michael van Gerwen (NED); Martin Schindler (GER)
European Championship	2026	Winner	Ross Smith (ENG)	Luke Littler (ENG); Luke Humphries (ENG); Ross Smith (ENG); Gian van Veen (NED); Gerwyn Price (WAL); James Wade (ENG); Nathan Aspinall (ENG); Michael van Gerwen (NED); Martin Schindler (GER)
Players Championship Finals	2025	Winner	Luke Littler (ENG)	Luke Littler (ENG); Luke Humphries (ENG); Ross Smith (ENG); Gian van Veen (NED); Gerwyn Price (WAL); James Wade (ENG); Nathan Aspinall (ENG); Michael van Gerwen (NED); Martin Schindler (GER)
World Series of Darts Finals	2026	Winner	Ross Smith (ENG)	Luke Littler (ENG); Luke Humphries (ENG); Ross Smith (ENG); Gian van Veen (NED); Gerwyn Price (WAL); James Wade (ENG); Nathan Aspinall (ENG); Michael van Gerwen (NED); Martin Schindler (GER)
PDC World Cup of Darts	2026	Winners	Luke Littler (ENG); Luke Humphries (ENG)	Luke Littler (ENG); Luke Humphries (ENG); Ross Smith (ENG); Gian van Veen (NED); Gerwyn Price (WAL); James Wade (ENG); Nathan Aspinall (ENG); Michael van Gerwen (NED); Martin Schindler (GER)
PDC World Darts Championship	2026	Runner-up	Gian van Veen (NED)	Luke Littler (ENG); Luke Humphries (ENG); Ross Smith (ENG); Gian van Veen (NED); Gerwyn Price (WAL); James Wade (ENG); Nathan Aspinall (ENG); Michael van Gerwen (NED); Martin Schindler (GER)
Grand Slam of Darts	2025	Runner-up	Luke Humphries (ENG)	Luke Littler (ENG); Luke Humphries (ENG); Ross Smith (ENG); Gian van Veen (NED); Gerwyn Price (WAL); James Wade (ENG); Nathan Aspinall (ENG); Michael van Gerwen (NED); Martin Schindler (GER)
Premier League Darts	2026	Runner-up	Luke Humphries (ENG)	Luke Littler (ENG); Luke Humphries (ENG); Ross Smith (ENG); Gian van Veen (NED); Gerwyn Price (WAL); James Wade (ENG); Nathan Aspinall (ENG); Michael van Gerwen (NED); Martin Schindler (GER)
World Matchplay	2026	Runner-up	Gerwyn Price (WAL)	Luke Littler (ENG); Luke Humphries (ENG); Ross Smith (ENG); Gian van Veen (NED); Gerwyn Price (WAL); James Wade (ENG); Nathan Aspinall (ENG); Michael van Gerwen (NED); Martin Schindler (GER)
World Grand Prix	2026	Runner-up	Gerwyn Price (WAL)	Luke Littler (ENG); Luke Humphries (ENG); Ross Smith (ENG); Gian van Veen (NED); Gerwyn Price (WAL); James Wade (ENG); Nathan Aspinall (ENG); Michael van Gerwen (NED); Martin Schindler (GER)
World Masters	2026	Runner-up	Luke Humphries (ENG)	Luke Littler (ENG); Luke Humphries (ENG); Ross Smith (ENG); Gian van Veen (NED); Gerwyn Price (WAL); James Wade (ENG); Nathan Aspinall (ENG); Michael van Gerwen (NED); Martin Schindler (GER)
UK Open	2026	Runner-up	James Wade (ENG)	Luke Littler (ENG); Luke Humphries (ENG); Ross Smith (ENG); Gian van Veen (NED); Gerwyn Price (WAL); James Wade (ENG); Nathan Aspinall (ENG); Michael van Gerwen (NED); Martin Schindler (GER)
European Championship	2026	Runner-up	Martin Schindler (GER)	Luke Littler (ENG); Luke Humphries (ENG); Ross Smith (ENG); Gian van Veen (NED); Gerwyn Price (WAL); James Wade (ENG); Nathan Aspinall (ENG); Michael van Gerwen (NED); Martin Schindler (GER)
Players Championship Finals	2025	Runner-up	Nathan Aspinall (ENG)	Luke Littler (ENG); Luke Humphries (ENG); Ross Smith (ENG); Gian van Veen (NED); Gerwyn Price (WAL); James Wade (ENG); Nathan Aspinall (ENG); Michael van Gerwen (NED); Martin Schindler (GER)
World Series of Darts Finals	2026	Runner-up	Gerwyn Price (WAL)	Luke Littler (ENG); Luke Humphries (ENG); Ross Smith (ENG); Gian van Veen (NED); Gerwyn Price (WAL); James Wade (ENG); Nathan Aspinall (ENG); Michael van Gerwen (NED); Martin Schindler (GER)
PDC World Cup of Darts	2026	Runners-up	Gian van Veen (NED); Michael van Gerwen (NED)	Luke Littler (ENG); Luke Humphries (ENG); Ross Smith (ENG); Gian van Veen (NED); Gerwyn Price (WAL); James Wade (ENG); Nathan Aspinall (ENG); Michael van Gerwen (NED); Martin Schindler (GER)

=== Additional qualifiers ===
Tournament	Year	Position	Player
PDC World Youth Championship	2025	Winner	Gian van Veen (NED)
PDC World Youth Championship	2025	Runner-up	Beau Greaves (ENG)
PDC World Youth Championship	2026	Finalists	Cam Crabtree (ENG)
PDC World Youth Championship	2026	Finalists	Jan Schmidt (GER)
PDC Development Tour	2026	Order of Merit Winner	Sebastian Białecki (POL)
PDC Challenge Tour	2026	Order of Merit Winner	Joe Hunt (ENG)
Women's World Matchplay	2026	Winner	Beau Greaves (ENG)
PDC Women's Series	2026	Order of Merit Runner-up	Lisa Ashton (ENG) (Note: Lisa Ashton qualified as the highest-ranked non-qualified player on the 2026 Women’s Series rankings.)
PDC Asian Championship	2026	Winner	Paolo Nebrida (PHI)
North American Championship	2026	Winner	Adam Sevada (USA)
PDC Nordic & Baltic Championship	2026	Winner	Anton Östlund (SWE)
ANZ Premier League	2026	Winner	Raymond Smith (AUS)

=== European Tour ===
Tournament	Event	Player	Qualifiers
2026 PDC European Tour
2026 PDC European Tour	Poland Darts Open	Luke Littler (ENG)	Wessel Nijman (NED); Jonny Clayton (WAL); Josh Rock (NIR); Luke Woodhouse (ENG); Krzysztof Ratajski (POL); Niels Zonneveld (NED)
2026 PDC European Tour	European Darts Trophy	Wessel Nijman (NED)	Wessel Nijman (NED); Jonny Clayton (WAL); Josh Rock (NIR); Luke Woodhouse (ENG); Krzysztof Ratajski (POL); Niels Zonneveld (NED)
2026 PDC European Tour	Belgian Darts Open	Luke Humphries (ENG)	Wessel Nijman (NED); Jonny Clayton (WAL); Josh Rock (NIR); Luke Woodhouse (ENG); Krzysztof Ratajski (POL); Niels Zonneveld (NED)
2026 PDC European Tour	German Darts Grand Prix	Nathan Aspinall (ENG)	Wessel Nijman (NED); Jonny Clayton (WAL); Josh Rock (NIR); Luke Woodhouse (ENG); Krzysztof Ratajski (POL); Niels Zonneveld (NED)
2026 PDC European Tour	European Darts Grand Prix	Gerwyn Price (WAL)	Wessel Nijman (NED); Jonny Clayton (WAL); Josh Rock (NIR); Luke Woodhouse (ENG); Krzysztof Ratajski (POL); Niels Zonneveld (NED)
2026 PDC European Tour	Austrian Darts Open	Josh Rock (NIR)	Wessel Nijman (NED); Jonny Clayton (WAL); Josh Rock (NIR); Luke Woodhouse (ENG); Krzysztof Ratajski (POL); Niels Zonneveld (NED)
2026 PDC European Tour	International Darts Open	Ross Smith (ENG)	Wessel Nijman (NED); Jonny Clayton (WAL); Josh Rock (NIR); Luke Woodhouse (ENG); Krzysztof Ratajski (POL); Niels Zonneveld (NED)
2026 PDC European Tour	Baltic Sea Darts Open	Luke Woodhouse (ENG)	Wessel Nijman (NED); Jonny Clayton (WAL); Josh Rock (NIR); Luke Woodhouse (ENG); Krzysztof Ratajski (POL); Niels Zonneveld (NED)
2026 PDC European Tour	Slovak Darts Open	Wessel Nijman (NED) (2)	Wessel Nijman (NED); Jonny Clayton (WAL); Josh Rock (NIR); Luke Woodhouse (ENG); Krzysztof Ratajski (POL); Niels Zonneveld (NED)
2026 PDC European Tour	European Darts Open	Krzysztof Ratajski (POL)	Wessel Nijman (NED); Jonny Clayton (WAL); Josh Rock (NIR); Luke Woodhouse (ENG); Krzysztof Ratajski (POL); Niels Zonneveld (NED)
2026 PDC European Tour	Hungarian Darts Trophy	Ross Smith (ENG) (2)	Wessel Nijman (NED); Jonny Clayton (WAL); Josh Rock (NIR); Luke Woodhouse (ENG); Krzysztof Ratajski (POL); Niels Zonneveld (NED)
2026 PDC European Tour	Czech Darts Open	Luke Littler (ENG) (2)	Wessel Nijman (NED); Jonny Clayton (WAL); Josh Rock (NIR); Luke Woodhouse (ENG); Krzysztof Ratajski (POL); Niels Zonneveld (NED)
2026 PDC European Tour	Flanders Darts Trophy	James Wade (ENG)	Wessel Nijman (NED); Jonny Clayton (WAL); Josh Rock (NIR); Luke Woodhouse (ENG); Krzysztof Ratajski (POL); Niels Zonneveld (NED)
2026 PDC European Tour	Swiss Darts Trophy	Jonny Clayton (WAL)	Wessel Nijman (NED); Jonny Clayton (WAL); Josh Rock (NIR); Luke Woodhouse (ENG); Krzysztof Ratajski (POL); Niels Zonneveld (NED)
2026 PDC European Tour	Dutch Darts Championship	Niels Zonneveld (NED)	Wessel Nijman (NED); Jonny Clayton (WAL); Josh Rock (NIR); Luke Woodhouse (ENG); Krzysztof Ratajski (POL); Niels Zonneveld (NED)

=== Players Championships ===
Tournament	Event	Player	Qualifiers
2026 PDC Players Championship series
2026 PDC Players Championship series	Players Championship 1	James Wade (ENG)	3 wins: Chris Dobey (ENG); 2 wins: Cameron Menzies (SCO); 1 win: Ryan Searle (ENG); Jermaine Wattimena (NED); Rob Cross (ENG); Kevin Doets (NED); Andrew Gilding (ENG); Jeffrey de Graaf (SWE); Karel Sedláček (CZE); Gabriel Clemens (GER); Henry Coates (ENG); Charlie Manby (ENG); Tommy Morris (ENG)
2026 PDC Players Championship series	Players Championship 2	Wessel Nijman (NED)	3 wins: Chris Dobey (ENG); 2 wins: Cameron Menzies (SCO); 1 win: Ryan Searle (ENG); Jermaine Wattimena (NED); Rob Cross (ENG); Kevin Doets (NED); Andrew Gilding (ENG); Jeffrey de Graaf (SWE); Karel Sedláček (CZE); Gabriel Clemens (GER); Henry Coates (ENG); Charlie Manby (ENG); Tommy Morris (ENG)
2026 PDC Players Championship series	Players Championship 3	Chris Dobey (ENG)	3 wins: Chris Dobey (ENG); 2 wins: Cameron Menzies (SCO); 1 win: Ryan Searle (ENG); Jermaine Wattimena (NED); Rob Cross (ENG); Kevin Doets (NED); Andrew Gilding (ENG); Jeffrey de Graaf (SWE); Karel Sedláček (CZE); Gabriel Clemens (GER); Henry Coates (ENG); Charlie Manby (ENG); Tommy Morris (ENG)
2026 PDC Players Championship series	Players Championship 4	Luke Humphries (ENG)	3 wins: Chris Dobey (ENG); 2 wins: Cameron Menzies (SCO); 1 win: Ryan Searle (ENG); Jermaine Wattimena (NED); Rob Cross (ENG); Kevin Doets (NED); Andrew Gilding (ENG); Jeffrey de Graaf (SWE); Karel Sedláček (CZE); Gabriel Clemens (GER); Henry Coates (ENG); Charlie Manby (ENG); Tommy Morris (ENG)
2026 PDC Players Championship series	Players Championship 5	Ross Smith (ENG)	3 wins: Chris Dobey (ENG); 2 wins: Cameron Menzies (SCO); 1 win: Ryan Searle (ENG); Jermaine Wattimena (NED); Rob Cross (ENG); Kevin Doets (NED); Andrew Gilding (ENG); Jeffrey de Graaf (SWE); Karel Sedláček (CZE); Gabriel Clemens (GER); Henry Coates (ENG); Charlie Manby (ENG); Tommy Morris (ENG)
2026 PDC Players Championship series	Players Championship 6	Gerwyn Price (WAL)	3 wins: Chris Dobey (ENG); 2 wins: Cameron Menzies (SCO); 1 win: Ryan Searle (ENG); Jermaine Wattimena (NED); Rob Cross (ENG); Kevin Doets (NED); Andrew Gilding (ENG); Jeffrey de Graaf (SWE); Karel Sedláček (CZE); Gabriel Clemens (GER); Henry Coates (ENG); Charlie Manby (ENG); Tommy Morris (ENG)
2026 PDC Players Championship series	Players Championship 7	Ryan Searle (ENG)	3 wins: Chris Dobey (ENG); 2 wins: Cameron Menzies (SCO); 1 win: Ryan Searle (ENG); Jermaine Wattimena (NED); Rob Cross (ENG); Kevin Doets (NED); Andrew Gilding (ENG); Jeffrey de Graaf (SWE); Karel Sedláček (CZE); Gabriel Clemens (GER); Henry Coates (ENG); Charlie Manby (ENG); Tommy Morris (ENG)
2026 PDC Players Championship series	Players Championship 8	Wessel Nijman (NED) (2)	3 wins: Chris Dobey (ENG); 2 wins: Cameron Menzies (SCO); 1 win: Ryan Searle (ENG); Jermaine Wattimena (NED); Rob Cross (ENG); Kevin Doets (NED); Andrew Gilding (ENG); Jeffrey de Graaf (SWE); Karel Sedláček (CZE); Gabriel Clemens (GER); Henry Coates (ENG); Charlie Manby (ENG); Tommy Morris (ENG)
2026 PDC Players Championship series	Players Championship 9	Chris Dobey (ENG) (2)	3 wins: Chris Dobey (ENG); 2 wins: Cameron Menzies (SCO); 1 win: Ryan Searle (ENG); Jermaine Wattimena (NED); Rob Cross (ENG); Kevin Doets (NED); Andrew Gilding (ENG); Jeffrey de Graaf (SWE); Karel Sedláček (CZE); Gabriel Clemens (GER); Henry Coates (ENG); Charlie Manby (ENG); Tommy Morris (ENG)
2026 PDC Players Championship series	Players Championship 10	Wessel Nijman (NED) (3)	3 wins: Chris Dobey (ENG); 2 wins: Cameron Menzies (SCO); 1 win: Ryan Searle (ENG); Jermaine Wattimena (NED); Rob Cross (ENG); Kevin Doets (NED); Andrew Gilding (ENG); Jeffrey de Graaf (SWE); Karel Sedláček (CZE); Gabriel Clemens (GER); Henry Coates (ENG); Charlie Manby (ENG); Tommy Morris (ENG)
2026 PDC Players Championship series	Players Championship 11	Beau Greaves (ENG)	3 wins: Chris Dobey (ENG); 2 wins: Cameron Menzies (SCO); 1 win: Ryan Searle (ENG); Jermaine Wattimena (NED); Rob Cross (ENG); Kevin Doets (NED); Andrew Gilding (ENG); Jeffrey de Graaf (SWE); Karel Sedláček (CZE); Gabriel Clemens (GER); Henry Coates (ENG); Charlie Manby (ENG); Tommy Morris (ENG)
2026 PDC Players Championship series	Players Championship 12	Wessel Nijman (NED) (4)	3 wins: Chris Dobey (ENG); 2 wins: Cameron Menzies (SCO); 1 win: Ryan Searle (ENG); Jermaine Wattimena (NED); Rob Cross (ENG); Kevin Doets (NED); Andrew Gilding (ENG); Jeffrey de Graaf (SWE); Karel Sedláček (CZE); Gabriel Clemens (GER); Henry Coates (ENG); Charlie Manby (ENG); Tommy Morris (ENG)
2026 PDC Players Championship series	Players Championship 13	Kevin Doets (NED)	3 wins: Chris Dobey (ENG); 2 wins: Cameron Menzies (SCO); 1 win: Ryan Searle (ENG); Jermaine Wattimena (NED); Rob Cross (ENG); Kevin Doets (NED); Andrew Gilding (ENG); Jeffrey de Graaf (SWE); Karel Sedláček (CZE); Gabriel Clemens (GER); Henry Coates (ENG); Charlie Manby (ENG); Tommy Morris (ENG)
2026 PDC Players Championship series	Players Championship 14	Wessel Nijman (NED) (5)	3 wins: Chris Dobey (ENG); 2 wins: Cameron Menzies (SCO); 1 win: Ryan Searle (ENG); Jermaine Wattimena (NED); Rob Cross (ENG); Kevin Doets (NED); Andrew Gilding (ENG); Jeffrey de Graaf (SWE); Karel Sedláček (CZE); Gabriel Clemens (GER); Henry Coates (ENG); Charlie Manby (ENG); Tommy Morris (ENG)
2026 PDC Players Championship series	Players Championship 15	Michael van Gerwen (NED)	3 wins: Chris Dobey (ENG); 2 wins: Cameron Menzies (SCO); 1 win: Ryan Searle (ENG); Jermaine Wattimena (NED); Rob Cross (ENG); Kevin Doets (NED); Andrew Gilding (ENG); Jeffrey de Graaf (SWE); Karel Sedláček (CZE); Gabriel Clemens (GER); Henry Coates (ENG); Charlie Manby (ENG); Tommy Morris (ENG)
2026 PDC Players Championship series	Players Championship 16	Andrew Gilding (ENG)	3 wins: Chris Dobey (ENG); 2 wins: Cameron Menzies (SCO); 1 win: Ryan Searle (ENG); Jermaine Wattimena (NED); Rob Cross (ENG); Kevin Doets (NED); Andrew Gilding (ENG); Jeffrey de Graaf (SWE); Karel Sedláček (CZE); Gabriel Clemens (GER); Henry Coates (ENG); Charlie Manby (ENG); Tommy Morris (ENG)
2026 PDC Players Championship series	Players Championship 17	Luke Humphries (ENG) (2)	3 wins: Chris Dobey (ENG); 2 wins: Cameron Menzies (SCO); 1 win: Ryan Searle (ENG); Jermaine Wattimena (NED); Rob Cross (ENG); Kevin Doets (NED); Andrew Gilding (ENG); Jeffrey de Graaf (SWE); Karel Sedláček (CZE); Gabriel Clemens (GER); Henry Coates (ENG); Charlie Manby (ENG); Tommy Morris (ENG)
2026 PDC Players Championship series	Players Championship 18	Luke Woodhouse (ENG)	3 wins: Chris Dobey (ENG); 2 wins: Cameron Menzies (SCO); 1 win: Ryan Searle (ENG); Jermaine Wattimena (NED); Rob Cross (ENG); Kevin Doets (NED); Andrew Gilding (ENG); Jeffrey de Graaf (SWE); Karel Sedláček (CZE); Gabriel Clemens (GER); Henry Coates (ENG); Charlie Manby (ENG); Tommy Morris (ENG)
2026 PDC Players Championship series	Players Championship 19	Jeffrey de Graaf (SWE)	3 wins: Chris Dobey (ENG); 2 wins: Cameron Menzies (SCO); 1 win: Ryan Searle (ENG); Jermaine Wattimena (NED); Rob Cross (ENG); Kevin Doets (NED); Andrew Gilding (ENG); Jeffrey de Graaf (SWE); Karel Sedláček (CZE); Gabriel Clemens (GER); Henry Coates (ENG); Charlie Manby (ENG); Tommy Morris (ENG)
2026 PDC Players Championship series	Players Championship 20	Ross Smith (ENG) (2)	3 wins: Chris Dobey (ENG); 2 wins: Cameron Menzies (SCO); 1 win: Ryan Searle (ENG); Jermaine Wattimena (NED); Rob Cross (ENG); Kevin Doets (NED); Andrew Gilding (ENG); Jeffrey de Graaf (SWE); Karel Sedláček (CZE); Gabriel Clemens (GER); Henry Coates (ENG); Charlie Manby (ENG); Tommy Morris (ENG)
2026 PDC Players Championship series	Players Championship 21	Wessel Nijman (NED) (6)	3 wins: Chris Dobey (ENG); 2 wins: Cameron Menzies (SCO); 1 win: Ryan Searle (ENG); Jermaine Wattimena (NED); Rob Cross (ENG); Kevin Doets (NED); Andrew Gilding (ENG); Jeffrey de Graaf (SWE); Karel Sedláček (CZE); Gabriel Clemens (GER); Henry Coates (ENG); Charlie Manby (ENG); Tommy Morris (ENG)
2026 PDC Players Championship series	Players Championship 22	Rob Cross (ENG)	3 wins: Chris Dobey (ENG); 2 wins: Cameron Menzies (SCO); 1 win: Ryan Searle (ENG); Jermaine Wattimena (NED); Rob Cross (ENG); Kevin Doets (NED); Andrew Gilding (ENG); Jeffrey de Graaf (SWE); Karel Sedláček (CZE); Gabriel Clemens (GER); Henry Coates (ENG); Charlie Manby (ENG); Tommy Morris (ENG)
2026 PDC Players Championship series	Players Championship 23	Cameron Menzies (SCO)	3 wins: Chris Dobey (ENG); 2 wins: Cameron Menzies (SCO); 1 win: Ryan Searle (ENG); Jermaine Wattimena (NED); Rob Cross (ENG); Kevin Doets (NED); Andrew Gilding (ENG); Jeffrey de Graaf (SWE); Karel Sedláček (CZE); Gabriel Clemens (GER); Henry Coates (ENG); Charlie Manby (ENG); Tommy Morris (ENG)
2026 PDC Players Championship series	Players Championship 24	Gabriel Clemens (GER)	3 wins: Chris Dobey (ENG); 2 wins: Cameron Menzies (SCO); 1 win: Ryan Searle (ENG); Jermaine Wattimena (NED); Rob Cross (ENG); Kevin Doets (NED); Andrew Gilding (ENG); Jeffrey de Graaf (SWE); Karel Sedláček (CZE); Gabriel Clemens (GER); Henry Coates (ENG); Charlie Manby (ENG); Tommy Morris (ENG)
2026 PDC Players Championship series	Players Championship 25	Henry Coates (ENG)	3 wins: Chris Dobey (ENG); 2 wins: Cameron Menzies (SCO); 1 win: Ryan Searle (ENG); Jermaine Wattimena (NED); Rob Cross (ENG); Kevin Doets (NED); Andrew Gilding (ENG); Jeffrey de Graaf (SWE); Karel Sedláček (CZE); Gabriel Clemens (GER); Henry Coates (ENG); Charlie Manby (ENG); Tommy Morris (ENG)
2026 PDC Players Championship series	Players Championship 26	Sebastian Białecki (POL)	3 wins: Chris Dobey (ENG); 2 wins: Cameron Menzies (SCO); 1 win: Ryan Searle (ENG); Jermaine Wattimena (NED); Rob Cross (ENG); Kevin Doets (NED); Andrew Gilding (ENG); Jeffrey de Graaf (SWE); Karel Sedláček (CZE); Gabriel Clemens (GER); Henry Coates (ENG); Charlie Manby (ENG); Tommy Morris (ENG)
2026 PDC Players Championship series	Players Championship 27	Jermaine Wattimena (NED)	3 wins: Chris Dobey (ENG); 2 wins: Cameron Menzies (SCO); 1 win: Ryan Searle (ENG); Jermaine Wattimena (NED); Rob Cross (ENG); Kevin Doets (NED); Andrew Gilding (ENG); Jeffrey de Graaf (SWE); Karel Sedláček (CZE); Gabriel Clemens (GER); Henry Coates (ENG); Charlie Manby (ENG); Tommy Morris (ENG)
2026 PDC Players Championship series	Players Championship 28	Luke Humphries (ENG) (3)	3 wins: Chris Dobey (ENG); 2 wins: Cameron Menzies (SCO); 1 win: Ryan Searle (ENG); Jermaine Wattimena (NED); Rob Cross (ENG); Kevin Doets (NED); Andrew Gilding (ENG); Jeffrey de Graaf (SWE); Karel Sedláček (CZE); Gabriel Clemens (GER); Henry Coates (ENG); Charlie Manby (ENG); Tommy Morris (ENG)
2026 PDC Players Championship series	Players Championship 29	Cameron Menzies (SCO) (2)	3 wins: Chris Dobey (ENG); 2 wins: Cameron Menzies (SCO); 1 win: Ryan Searle (ENG); Jermaine Wattimena (NED); Rob Cross (ENG); Kevin Doets (NED); Andrew Gilding (ENG); Jeffrey de Graaf (SWE); Karel Sedláček (CZE); Gabriel Clemens (GER); Henry Coates (ENG); Charlie Manby (ENG); Tommy Morris (ENG)
2026 PDC Players Championship series	Players Championship 30	Karel Sedláček (CZE)	3 wins: Chris Dobey (ENG); 2 wins: Cameron Menzies (SCO); 1 win: Ryan Searle (ENG); Jermaine Wattimena (NED); Rob Cross (ENG); Kevin Doets (NED); Andrew Gilding (ENG); Jeffrey de Graaf (SWE); Karel Sedláček (CZE); Gabriel Clemens (GER); Henry Coates (ENG); Charlie Manby (ENG); Tommy Morris (ENG)
2026 PDC Players Championship series	Players Championship 31	Charlie Manby (ENG)	3 wins: Chris Dobey (ENG); 2 wins: Cameron Menzies (SCO); 1 win: Ryan Searle (ENG); Jermaine Wattimena (NED); Rob Cross (ENG); Kevin Doets (NED); Andrew Gilding (ENG); Jeffrey de Graaf (SWE); Karel Sedláček (CZE); Gabriel Clemens (GER); Henry Coates (ENG); Charlie Manby (ENG); Tommy Morris (ENG)
2026 PDC Players Championship series	Players Championship 32	Chris Dobey (ENG) (3)	3 wins: Chris Dobey (ENG); 2 wins: Cameron Menzies (SCO); 1 win: Ryan Searle (ENG); Jermaine Wattimena (NED); Rob Cross (ENG); Kevin Doets (NED); Andrew Gilding (ENG); Jeffrey de Graaf (SWE); Karel Sedláček (CZE); Gabriel Clemens (GER); Henry Coates (ENG); Charlie Manby (ENG); Tommy Morris (ENG)
2026 PDC Players Championship series	Players Championship 33	Luke Humphries (ENG) (4)	3 wins: Chris Dobey (ENG); 2 wins: Cameron Menzies (SCO); 1 win: Ryan Searle (ENG); Jermaine Wattimena (NED); Rob Cross (ENG); Kevin Doets (NED); Andrew Gilding (ENG); Jeffrey de Graaf (SWE); Karel Sedláček (CZE); Gabriel Clemens (GER); Henry Coates (ENG); Charlie Manby (ENG); Tommy Morris (ENG)
2026 PDC Players Championship series	Players Championship 34	Tommy Morris (ENG)	3 wins: Chris Dobey (ENG); 2 wins: Cameron Menzies (SCO); 1 win: Ryan Searle (ENG); Jermaine Wattimena (NED); Rob Cross (ENG); Kevin Doets (NED); Andrew Gilding (ENG); Jeffrey de Graaf (SWE); Karel Sedláček (CZE); Gabriel Clemens (GER); Henry Coates (ENG); Charlie Manby (ENG); Tommy Morris (ENG)

=== PDC Tour Card holder qualifying event ===
A further ten places were filled by qualifiers from a PDC Tour Card holder qualifier held on 6 November in Leicester.

The ten qualifiers were:

- Stephen Bunting (ENG)
- Maik Kuivenhoven (NED)
- Tom Sykes (ENG)
- Rusty-Jake Rodriguez (AUT)
- Niko Springer (GER)
- Ricky Evans (ENG)
- Carl Sneyd (ENG)
- Bradley Brooks (ENG)
- Joe Cullen (ENG)
- Alan Soutar (SCO)

== Pools ==
The top sixteen qualified players, based on their PDC Order of Merit ranking, were seeded into the group stage, with the other 32 participants being split into pools based on their ranking. Each group consisted of one player from each pool.

Pool A	Pool B	Pool C
(Seeded Players)	(Qualifiers)	
Luke Littler (1) Luke Humphries (2) Gian van Veen (3) Gerwyn Price (4) Jonny Clayton (5) Ross Smith (6) James Wade (7) Josh Rock (8) Stephen Bunting (9) Michael van Gerwen (10) Nathan Aspinall (11) Wessel Nijman (12) Ryan Searle (13) Chris Dobey (14); Luke Woodhouse (15); Jermaine Wattimena (16)	Krzysztof Ratajski; Martin Schindler; Kevin Doets; Rob Cross; Cameron Menzies; Andrew Gilding; Niels Zonneveld; Joe Cullen; Niko Springer; Jeffrey de Graaf; Karel Sedláček; Sebastian Białecki; Ricky Evans; Gabriel Clemens; Bradley Brooks; Alan Soutar	Cam Crabtree; Maik Kuivenhoven Beau Greaves; Charlie Manby; Tom Sykes; Tommy Morris; Joe Hunt; Henry Coates; Carl Sneyd; Rusty-Jake Rodriguez; Jan Schmidt; Anton Östlund; Lisa Ashton; Paolo Nebrida; Adam Sevada; Raymond Smith

== Draw ==
The results of the group stage and knockout stage are shown below. Numbers in brackets show the seedings for the top sixteen players in the tournament. Figures next to a player's name state their three-dart average in a match. Players in bold denote match winners.

=== Group stage ===
NB: P = Played; W = Won; L = Lost; LF = Legs for; LA = Legs against; +/− = Plus/minus record, in relation to legs; Pts = Points; Status = Qualified to knockout stage

==== Group A ====
Pos.	Player	P	W	L	LF	LA	+/−	Pts	Status
1	**Luke Littler (1)**	2	1	1	9	7	+2	**2**	**Q**
2	Niels Zonneveld	2	1	1	8	9	–1	**2**	**Eliminated**
3	Beau Greaves	2	1	1	7	8	–1	**2**	**Eliminated**

14 November

**Luke Littler** 109.97	**5**–2	Beau Greaves 103.82

15 November

Niels Zonneveld 87.71	3–**5**	**Beau Greaves** 94.86

16 November

**Niels Zonneveld** 101.12	**5**–4	Luke Littler 104.36

==== Group B ====
Pos.	Player	P	W	L	LF	LA	+/−	Pts	Status
1	**Jermaine Wattimena (16)**	2	2	0	10	6	+4	**4**	**Q**
2	Alan Soutar	2	1	1	9	7	+2	**2**	**Eliminated**
3	Lisa Ashton	2	0	2	4	10	–6	**0**	**Eliminated**

14 November

**Jermaine Wattimena** 87.80	**5**–2	Lisa Ashton 79.03

15 November

**Alan Soutar** 84.85	**5**–2	Lisa Ashton 74.80

16 November

Alan Soutar 98.19	4–**5**	**Jermaine Wattimena** 97.45

==== Group C ====
Pos.	Player	P	W	L	LF	LA	+/−	Pts	Status
1	**Kevin Doets**	2	2	0	10	4	+6	**4**	**Q**
2	Tommy Morris	2	1	1	6	7	–1	**2**	**Eliminated**
3	Josh Rock (8)	2	0	2	5	10	–5	**0**	**Eliminated**

14 November

Josh Rock 96.92	2–**5**	**Tommy Morris** 100.33

15 November

**Kevin Doets** 100.47	**5**–3	Josh Rock 89.50

16 November

**Kevin Doets** 98.27	**5**–1	Tommy Morris 90.83

==== Group D ====
Pos.	Player	P	W	L	LF	LA	+/−	Pts	Status
1	**Cameron Menzies**	2	2	0	10	6	+4	**4**	**Q**
2	Stephen Bunting (9)	2	1	1	7	9	–2	**2**	**Eliminated**
3	Raymond Smith	2	0	2	8	10	–2	**0**	**Eliminated**

14 November

**Stephen Bunting** 100.71	**5**–4	Raymond Smith 96.65

15 November

**Cameron Menzies** 96.19	**5**–4	Raymond Smith 97.19

16 November

**Cameron Menzies** 103.39	**5**–2	Stephen Bunting 101.74

==== Group E ====
Pos.	Player	P	W	L	LF	LA	+/−	Pts	Status
1	**Gerwyn Price (4)**	2	2	0	10	5	+5	**4**	**Q**
2	Sebastian Białecki	2	1	1	7	9	–2	**2**	**Eliminated**
3	Joe Hunt	2	0	2	7	10	–3	**0**	**Eliminated**

14 November

**Gerwyn Price** 97.83	**5**–3	Joe Hunt 96.61

15 November

**Sebastian Białecki** 90.27	**5**–4	Joe Hunt 94.26

16 November

Sebastian Białecki 79.86	2–**5**	**Gerwyn Price** 93.77

==== Group F ====
Pos.	Player	P	W	L	LF	LA	+/−	Pts	Status
1	**Ryan Searle (13)**	2	2	0	10	5	+5	**4**	**Q**
2	Andrew Gilding	2	1	1	6	9	–3	**2**	**Eliminated**
3	Charlie Manby	2	0	2	8	10	–2	**0**	**Eliminated**

14 November

**Ryan Searle** 98.55	**5**–4	Charlie Manby 86.19

15 November

**Andrew Gilding** 81.51	**5**–4	Charlie Manby 80.06

16 November

Andrew Gilding 89.10	1–**5**	**Ryan Searle** 91.88

==== Group G ====
Pos.	Player	P	W	L	LF	LA	+/−	Pts	Status
1	**Rob Cross**	2	2	0	10	2	+8	**4**	**Q**
2	Anton Östlund	2	1	1	6	9	–3	**2**	**Eliminated**
3	Jonny Clayton (5)	2	0	2	5	10	–5	**0**	**Eliminated**

14 November

Jonny Clayton 92.53	4–**5**	**Anton Östlund** 85.75

15 November

**Rob Cross** 114.32	**5**–1	Jonny Clayton 97.21

16 November

**Rob Cross** 92.81	**5**–1	Anton Östlund 87.92

==== Group H ====
Pos.	Player	P	W	L	LF	LA	+/−	Pts	Status
1	**Niko Springer**	2	2	0	10	4	+6	**4**	**Q**
2	Wessel Nijman (12)	2	1	1	8	6	+2	**2**	**Eliminated**
3	Adam Sevada	2	0	2	2	10	–8	**0**	**Eliminated**

14 November

**Wessel Nijman** 94.66	**5**–1	Adam Sevada 91.63

15 November

**Niko Springer** 100.99	**5**–1	Adam Sevada 86.58

16 November

**Niko Springer** 105.23	**5**–3	Wessel Nijman 99.89

==== Group I ====
Pos.	Player	P	W	L	LF	LA	+/−	Pts	Status
1	**Luke Humphries (2)**	2	2	0	10	5	+5	**4**	**Q**
2	Paolo Nebrida	2	1	1	8	7	+1	**2**	**Eliminated**
3	Joe Cullen	2	0	2	4	10	–6	**0**	**Eliminated**

14 November

**Luke Humphries** 105.70	**5**–3	Paolo Nebrida 91.03

15 November

Joe Cullen 76.93	2–**5**	**Paolo Nebrida** 85.40

17 November

Joe Cullen 103.22	2–**5**	**Luke Humphries** 98.67

==== Group J ====
Pos.	Player	P	W	L	LF	LA	+/−	Pts	Status
1	**Tom Sykes**	2	2	0	10	4	+6	**4**	**Q**
2	Krzysztof Ratajski	2	1	1	6	6	0	**2**	**Eliminated**
3	Luke Woodhouse (15)	2	0	2	4	10	–6	**0**	**Eliminated**

14 November

Luke Woodhouse 89.56	3–**5**	**Tom Sykes** 85.97

15 November

**Krzysztof Ratajski** 87.67	**5**–1	Luke Woodhouse 88.03

17 November

Krzysztof Ratajski 101.96	1–**5**	**Tom Sykes** 104.30

==== Group K ====
Pos.	Player	P	W	L	LF	LA	+/−	Pts	Status
1	**James Wade (7)**	2	2	0	10	1	+9	**4**	**Q**
2	Ricky Evans	2	1	1	5	9	–4	**2**	**Eliminated**
3	Cam Crabtree	2	0	2	5	10	–5	**0**	**Eliminated**

14 November

**James Wade** 104.09	**5**–1	Cam Crabtree 96.50

15 November

**Ricky Evans** 87.71	**5**–4	Cam Crabtree 87.32

17 November

Ricky Evans 94.35	0–**5**	**James Wade** 102.95

==== Group L ====
Pos.	Player	P	W	L	LF	LA	+/−	Pts	Status
1	**Michael van Gerwen (10)**	2	2	0	10	8	+2	**4**	**Q**
2	Henry Coates	2	1	1	9	9	0	**2**	**Eliminated**
3	Jeffrey de Graaf	2	0	2	8	10	–2	**0**	**Eliminated**

14 November

**Michael van Gerwen** 100.42	**5**–4	Henry Coates 99.19

15 November

Jeffrey de Graaf 86.29	4–**5**	**Henry Coates** 92.06

17 November

Jeffrey de Graaf 86.75	4–**5**	**Michael van Gerwen** 90.37

==== Group M ====
Pos.	Player	P	W	L	LF	LA	+/−	Pts	Status
1	**Gian van Veen (3)**	2	2	0	10	4	+6	**4**	**Q**
2	Bradley Brooks	2	1	1	7	8	–1	**2**	**Eliminated**
3	Carl Sneyd	2	0	2	5	10	–5	**0**	**Eliminated**

14 November

**Gian van Veen** 110.51	**5**–2	Carl Sneyd 101.09

15 November

**Bradley Brooks** 97.38	**5**–3	Carl Sneyd 87.46

17 November

Bradley Brooks 92.49	2–**5**	**Gian van Veen** 99.76

==== Group N ====
Pos.	Player	P	W	L	LF	LA	+/−	Pts	Status
1	**Martin Schindler**	2	2	0	10	5	+7	**4**	**Q**
2	Chris Dobey (14)	2	1	1	8	7	+1	**2**	**Eliminated**
3	Jan Schmidt	2	0	2	2	10	–8	**0**	**Eliminated**

14 November

**Chris Dobey** 98.66	**5**–2	Jan Schmidt 78.73

15 November

**Martin Schindler** 87.38	**5**–0	Jan Schmidt 83.39

17 November

**Martin Schindler** 96.38	**5**–3	Chris Dobey 92.41

==== Group O ====
Pos.	Player	P	W	L	LF	LA	+/−	Pts	Status
1	**Gabriel Clemens**	2	1	1	9	8	+1	**2**	**Q**
2	Rusty-Jake Rodriguez	2	1	1	8	8	0	**2**	**Eliminated**
3	Ross Smith (6)	2	1	1	8	9	–1	**2**	**Eliminated**

14 November

Ross Smith 86.51	3–**5**	**Rusty-Jake Rodriguez** 83.43

15 November

Gabriel Clemens 84.43	4–**5**	**Ross Smith** 91.74

17 November

**Gabriel Clemens** 85.47	**5**–3	Rusty-Jake Rodriguez 85.93

==== Group P ====
Pos.	Player	P	W	L	LF	LA	+/−	Pts	Status
1	**Nathan Aspinall (11)**	2	2	0	10	1	+9	**4**	**Q**
2	Maik Kuivenhoven	2	1	1	6	9	–3	**2**	**Eliminated**
3	Karel Sedláček	2	0	2	4	10	–6	**0**	**Eliminated**

14 November

**Nathan Aspinall** 111.68	**5**–1	Maik Kuivenhoven 87.71

15 November

Karel Sedláček 94.98	4–**5**	**Maik Kuivenhoven** 101.62

17 November

Karel Sedláček 93.04	0–**5**	**Nathan Aspinall** 101.55

=== Knockout stage ===
**Second round** (best of 19 legs); 18–19 November
A1	Luke Littler (1) 101.38	8
**B1**	**Jermaine Wattimena (16) 101.70**	**10**
**C1**	**Kevin Doets 101.51**	**10**
D1	Cameron Menzies 91.01	5
**E1**	**Gerwyn Price (4) 103.31**	**10**
F1	Ryan Searle (13) 99.34	7
G1	Rob Cross 96.05	8
**H1**	**Niko Springer 88.59**	**10**
I1	Luke Humphries (2) 102.02	9
**J1**	**Tom Sykes 99.32**	**10**
K1	James Wade (7) 98.21	8
**L1**	**Michael van Gerwen (10) 103.83**	**10**
**M1**	**Gian van Veen (3) 101.69**	**10**
N1	Martin Schindler 99.51	7
O1	Gabriel Clemens 96.55	7
**P1**	**Nathan Aspinall (11) 100.72**	**10**

**Quarter-finals** (best of 31 legs); 20–21 November
B1	Jermaine Wattimena (16) 100.06	7
**C1**	**Kevin Doets 102.63**	**16**
**E1**	**Gerwyn Price (4) 97.94**	**16**
H1	Niko Springer 97.72	15
J1	Tom Sykes 101.50	11
**L1**	**Michael van Gerwen (10) 105.84**	**16**
**M1**	**Gian van Veen (3) 95.17**	**16**
P1	Nathan Aspinall (11) 95.54	14

**Semi-finals** (best of 31 legs); 22 November
C1	Kevin Doets 94.06	13
**E1**	**Gerwyn Price (4) 95.03**	**16**
L1	Michael van Gerwen (10) 95.47	11
**M1**	**Gian van Veen (3) 98.66**	**16**

**Final** (best of 31 legs); 22 November
**E1**	**Gerwyn Price (4) 97.34**	**16**
M1	Gian van Veen (3) 94.76	11

== Top averages ==
The table lists all players who achieved an average of at least 100 in a match. If any player has multiple records, this is indicated by the number in brackets.

#	Player	Round	Average	Result
1	Rob Cross	Group Stage	114.32	Won
2	Nathan Aspinall	Group Stage	111.68	Won
3	Gian van Veen	Group Stage	110.51	Won
4	Luke Littler	Group Stage	109.97	Won
5	Michael van Gerwen	Quarter-finals	105.84	Won
6	Luke Humphries	Group Stage	105.70	Won
7	Niko Springer	Group Stage	105.23	Won
8	Luke Littler (2)	Group Stage	104.36	Lost
9	Tom Sykes	Group Stage	104.30	Won
10	James Wade	Group Stage	104.09	Won
11	Michael van Gerwen (2)	Second Round	103.83	Won
12	Beau Greaves	Group Stage	103.82	Lost
13	Cameron Menzies	Group Stage	103.39	Won
14	Gerwyn Price	Second Round	103.31	Won
15	Joe Cullen	Group Stage	103.22	Lost
16	James Wade (2)	Group Stage	102.95	Won
17	Kevin Doets	Quarter-finals	102.63	Won
18	Luke Humphries (2)	Second Round	102.02	Lost
19	Krzysztof Ratajski	Group Stage	101.96	Lost
20	Stephen Bunting	Group Stage	101.74	Lost
21	Jermaine Wattimena	Second Round	101.70	Won
22	Gian van Veen (2)	Second Round	101.69	Won
23	Maik Kuivenhoven	Group Stage	101.62	Won
24	Nathan Aspinall (2)	Group Stage	101.55	Won
25	Kevin Doets (2)	Second Round	101.51	Won
26	Tom Sykes (2)	Quarter-finals	101.50	Lost
27	Luke Littler (3)	Second Round	101.38	Lost
28	Niels Zonneveld	Group Stage	101.12	Won
29	Carl Sneyd	Group Stage	101.09	Lost
30	Niko Springer (2)	Group Stage	100.99	Won
31	Nathan Aspinall (3)	Second Round	100.72	Won
32	Stephen Bunting (2)	Group Stage	100.71	Won
33	Kevin Doets (3)	Group Stage	100.47	Won
34	Michael van Gerwen (3)	Group Stage	100.42	Won
35	Tommy Morris	Group Stage	100.33	Won
36	Jermaine Wattimena (2)	Quarter-finals	100.06	Lost
