= Henry Coates =

English darts player (born 2006)

Personal information
- Born: 3 July 2006 (age 20) Matlock, Derbyshire, England

Sport
- Sport: Darts
- Darts: 22g Unicorn
- Laterality: Right-handed
- Walk-on music: "Centuries" by Fall Out Boy

Organisation (see split in darts)
- PDC: 2022–present
- WDF: 2022–2025
- Current world ranking: (PDC) 96 (5 November 2026)

PDC premier events – best performances
- UK Open: Last 64: 2026
- Grand Slam: Group Stage: 2026
- PC Finals: Last 64: 2026

Other tournament wins
- Years
Players Championships (×1)
2026 Players Championship 25
PDC Development Tour (×1)
2024 Development Tour 24

Henry Coates (born 3 July 2006) is an English darts player who competes in Professional Darts Corporation (PDC) events. He won his first PDC ranking title at Players Championship 25 in July 2026, defeating Damon Heta 8–4 in the final and becoming the fifth player to win a ranking title without holding a PDC Tour Card. He also won PDC Development Tour 24 in 2024.

== Career ==
Coates began playing darts on a magnetic dartboard when he was two years old, gifted to him by a friend of his older brother. He first represented the Derbyshire county darts team at age 10. He became a regular player at the Jamie Caven Darts Academy in Derby, subsequently signing with darts manufacturer Unicorn at age 12.

Coates contested the Junior Darts Corporation's 2021 International Open final in Gibraltar, where he lost 6–4 to future world champion Luke Littler. He captained the England team, featuring Littler, that won the JDC World Cup in 2022. In 2024, he won his first PDC Development Tour title, defeating Owen Roelofs 5–3 in the final of Development Tour 24. He also threw his first PDC nine-dart finish during a first-round loss to Steve Haggerty at Challenge Tour 11 the same year. In the World Darts Federation (WDF), Coates reached the semi-finals of the British Open in 2024 and 2025.

Despite not having a PDC Tour Card, Coates has received call-ups to PDC Pro Tour events as a top-up player from the Challenge Tour. He reached the semi-finals of Players Championship 20 in June 2026; he missed three match darts to advance to the final, losing 7–6 to Ross Smith after originally going 6–3 behind. The next month, Coates achieved his first PDC ranking title at Players Championship 25, defeating Damon Heta 8–4 in the final with a three-dart average of 104.88. He became the fifth player to win a ranking title without holding a Tour Card, after Joe Murnan, Krzysztof Ratajski, Scott Williams, and Wesley Plaisier.

== Personal life ==
Coates is from Matlock, Derbyshire, England. He was an NCFE Level 3 Sport and Physical Activity student at Chesterfield College. He cites Terry Jenkins as his darting inspiration. Outside of darts, he works part-time at his father's butcher shop in Darley Dale.

== Performance timeline ==
=== PDC ===
Tournament	2025	2026
PDC Ranked televised events
World Masters	Prel.	Prel.
UK Open	1R	4R
Grand Slam	DNP	RR
Career statistics
Season-end ranking (PDC)	186	

==== Players Championships ====
Season	1	2	3	4	5	6	7	8	9	10	11	12	13	14	15	16	17	18	19	20	21	22	23	24	25	26	27	28	29	30	31	32	33	34
2025	Did not participate																			LEI; 1R	LEI; 2R	HIL; 2R	HIL; 3R	Did not participate										
2026	DNP				LEI; 1R	LEI; 2R	Did not participate												MIL; 3R	MIL; SF	WIG; 1R	WIG; 1R	LEI; 1R	LEI; 1R	HIL; W	HIL; 3R	LEI; 1R	LEI; 2R	ROS; 3R	ROS; 1R	ROS; 2R	ROS; 1R	LEI; 3R	LEI; 1R

==== Challenge Tour ====
Season	1	2	3	4	5	6	7	8	9	10	11	12	13	14	15	16	17	18	19	20	21	22	23	24
2023	L256	L16	L256	L128	L128	L64	L128	L256	L128	L256	L64	L128	L128	L128	L16	L64	L128	L256	L128	L256	L32	L128	L128	L64
2024	L128	L128	L256	L256	L256	L16	L128	L256	L64	L128	L256	L256	L256	L128	L64	L256	L128	L64	L256	L256	L128	L64	L64	L128
2025	QF	L128	L256	L256	L512	L64	L64	L128	L64	L256	F	L256	L16	L64	L256	L128	L32	L64	L256	L128	L128	L128	L128	L128
2026	L32	L32	L64	L256	SF	L64	L32	DNP			F	L16	L64	L32	L128	L256	L32	QF	SF	L32	L256	L64	L128	L128

==== Development Tour ====
Season	1	2	3	4	5	6	7	8	9	10	11	12	13	14	15	16	17	18	19	20	21	22	23	24
2022	Did not participate															L16	L64	L64	L256	L128	L64	L64	L64	L128
2023	L16	L16	L128	L16	L256	L64	L256	L32	L128	L256	L128	L128	L16	L128	L32	L64	L64	L256	L64	L128	L64	L32	L256	L256
2024	L64	L128	L128	L16	L64	L64	L128	L16	L256	QF	QF	L256	L32	L256	L256	L128	L32	L128	L128	L64	L16	L256	L256	W
2025	L128	L16	L32	L64	QF	F	L128	L128	L256	L128	L256	L128	SF	F	L32	L64	L256	L64	L256	F	L128	L128	L64	L128
2026	L256	L32	QF	L128	L128	L32	L128	L32	L64	QF	QF	L128	L16	L256	L128	L32	L128	DNP	L64	F	L128	L32	W	L128

Performance Table Legend
W	Won the tournament	F	Finalist	SF	Semifinalist	QF	Quarterfinalist	#R; RR; Prel.	Lost in # round Round-robin; Preliminary round	DQ	Disqualified
DNQ	Did not qualify	DNP	Did not participate	WD	Withdrew	NH	Tournament not held	#R; RR; Prel.	Lost in # round Round-robin; Preliminary round	NYF	Not yet founded
