= Tom Sykes (darts player) =

- Sykes at the 2026 Grand Slam of Darts

Personal information
- Full name: Thomas Sykes
- Nickname: "The Castleford Tiger"
- Born: 4 November 1992 (age 34) Castleford, England

Sport
- Sport: Darts
- Playing since: 2013
- Darts: 22g Unicorn
- Laterality: Right-handed
- Walk-on music: "The Business" by Tiësto

Organisation (see split in darts)
- BDO: 2014, 2016–2017
- PDC: 2013–2016, 2024–present (Tour Card: 2026–present)
- WDF: 2021, 2024–2025
- Current world ranking: (PDC) 81 (5 November 2026)

PDC premier events – best performances
- UK Open: Last 64: 2026
- Grand Slam: Quarter-final: 2026

Thomas Sykes (born 4 November 1992) is an English professional darts player who competes in Professional Darts Corporation (PDC) events. After earning a PDC Tour Card in January 2026, he reached the semi-finals of the 2026 Slovak Darts Open on his European Tour debut. He was a two-time quarter-finalist during the 2026 PDC Players Championship series.

== Career ==
Sykes began his career in 2013 participating in PDC Challenge Tour tournaments. The following year, he qualified directly for the 2014 PDC World Youth Championship via the PDC Development Tour, where he reached the second round by defeating Eric Pedley, but lost to eventual finalist Rowby-John Rodriguez. In addition, he made his debut on the World Darts Federation (WDF) Tour in 2014 and reached the last 32 at the Belgium Open and the British Open. At the 2014 World Masters, he was eliminated in the preliminary round after a defeat against Ady Hogg. Sykes qualified again for the PDC World Youth Championship in 2016 and again reached the second round by defeating Lee Whitworth, but then lost to eventual finalist Berry van Peer.

At the beginning of 2024, Sykes won week 10 of the MODUS Super Series and thus qualified for the sixth series' Champions Week. He reached the Series 6 final, where he lost 4–1 to Scott Taylor. Sykes went on to reach a further two series finals, losing to Darius Labanauskas in Series 9 and Charlie Manby in Series 12. Sykes competed at the 2025 UK Open as an amateur qualifier; he earned wins over Owen Roelofs and Thibault Tricole before being eliminated by William O'Connor in the third round.

In January 2026, Sykes defeated Stephen Burton 6–4 on the penultimate day of 2026 PDC Q-School to earn a PDC Tour Card for the first time. During the year, he reached the quarter-finals of Players Championship 9 and Players Championship 23. On his PDC European Tour debut at the 2026 Slovak Darts Open, Sykes defeated four opponents to reach the semi-finals of the tournament, where he lost 7–2 to Rob Cross. In November 2026, he secured his debut at the Grand Slam of Darts as one of the ten Tour Card holder qualifiers. At the event, he defeated Krzysztof Ratajski and Luke Woodhouse to win his group, before achieving a 10–9 upset victory over world number two Luke Humphries in the second round.

== Performance timeline ==
=== PDC ===
Tournament	2025	2026
PDC Ranked televised events
World Masters	DNQ	Prel.
UK Open	3R	4R
Grand Slam	DNQ	QF
Players Championship Finals	DNQ	
Career statistics
Season-end ranking (PDC)	178	

==== European Tour ====
Tournament	2026
Slovak Open	SF
Hungarian Trophy	2R

==== Players Championships ====
Season	1	2	3	4	5	6	7	8	9	10	11	12	13	14	15	16	17	18	19	20	21	22	23	24	25	26	27	28	29	30	31	32	33	34
2026	HIL; 2R	HIL; 2R	WIG; 2R	WIG; 3R	LEI; 2R	LEI; 1R	LEI; 1R	LEI; 4R	WIG; QF	WIG; 1R	MIL; 3R	MIL; 2R	HIL; 3R	HIL; 3R	LEI; 2R	LEI; 2R	LEI; 1R	LEI; 2R	MIL; 2R	MIL; 2R	WIG; 2R	WIG; 1R	LEI; QF	LEI; 2R	HIL; 1R	HIL; 3R	LEI; 3R	LEI; 2R	ROS; 1R	ROS; 3R	ROS; 2R	ROS; 2R	LEI; 1R	LEI; 3R

Performance Table Legend
W	Won the tournament	F	Finalist	SF	Semifinalist	QF	Quarterfinalist	#R; RR; Prel.	Lost in # round Round-robin; Preliminary round	DQ	Disqualified
DNQ	Did not qualify	DNP	Did not participate	WD	Withdrew	NH	Tournament not held	#R; RR; Prel.	Lost in # round Round-robin; Preliminary round	NYF	Not yet founded

== Nine-dart finishes ==
Tom Sykes' televised nine-dart finishes
Date	Opponent	Tournament	Method	Prize
21 November 2026	(Netherlands) Michael van Gerwen	Grand Slam of Darts	3 x T20; 3 x T20; T20, T19, D12	N/A
