= 2026 PDC Development Tour =

Series of darts tournaments

The 2026 PDC Development Tour, known as the Winmau Development Tour for sponsorship reasons, is a series of non-televised darts tournaments organised by the Professional Darts Corporation (PDC). A secondary tour to the 2026 PDC Pro Tour, it consists of 24 events, held over four weekends of five events and one weekend of four events. The Development Tour, sponsored by Winmau, is the PDC's youth system open to all players outside of the top 64 on the PDC Order of Merit that are aged 16 to 24. (Note: Players must have been 23 or under on 4 January 2026 to be eligible. Players are allowed to compete on the Development Tour from the day they turn 16.)

== Order of Merit ==
According to the PDC's Order of Merit rules, the 2026 Development Tour provides the following prizes based on the final Order of Merit:

- The top two players on the Development Tour Order of Merit, who have not obtained a PDC Tour Card via another method, win a two-year Tour Card for the 2027 and 2028 seasons.
- The top three players on the Development Tour Order of Merit, who have not qualified via another method, qualify for places at the 2027 PDC World Championship.
- The highest ranked player on the Development Tour Order of Merit receives a spot at the 2026 Grand Slam of Darts.
- The players in the top 16 of the Development Tour Order of Merit, who have not obtained a PDC Tour Card before 2027 Q-School, are granted free entry to the final stage of Q-School.
- The eight highest ranked players from the Development Tour Order of Merit, who do not earn a Tour Card for the 2027 season, qualify for the first round of the 2027 UK Open.

2026 Development Tour ranking top 16 (As of 2 August 2026)
Rank	Player	Prize money
1	Sebastian Białecki (POL)	£21,900
2	Jurjen van der Velde (NED)	£12,350
3	Cam Crabtree (ENG)	£12,350
4	Jamai van den Herik (NED)	£12,250
5	Owen Bates (ENG)	£12,200
6	Jack Drayton (ENG)	£12,200
7	Leon Weber (GER)	£11,350
8	Dominik Grüllich (GER)	£11,300
9	Archie Self (ENG)	£10,550
10	James Beeton (ENG)	£10,400
11	Henry Coates (ENG)	£9,050
12	Dylan Slevin (IRL)	£9,050
13	Adam Gawlas (CZE)	£8,550
14	Charlie Manby (ENG)	£8,500
15	Kaya Baysal (TUR)	£8,350
16	Nathan Potter (ENG)	£8,100

== Prize money ==
The total prize money for Development Tour events in 2026 increased to £20,000 per event from a previous total of £15,000 in 2025. The winner of each event receives £3,000. The prize fund breakdown is:

Stage (no. of players)		Prize money (Total: £20,000)
Winner	(1)	£3,000
Runner-up	(1)	£2,000
Semi-finalists	(2)	£1,000
Quarter-finalists	(4)	£750
Last 16	(8)	£350
Last 32	(16)	£250
Last 64	(32)	£100

== February ==
=== Development Tour 1 ===
Development Tour 1 was contested on 20 February 2026 at the Leicester Arena. The tournament was won by Jurjen van der Velde, who defeated Dylan Slevin 5–1 in the final.

Quarter-finals (best of 9 legs)
Jenson Walker 87.50	5
(England) Sam Jackson 75.44	2
Jurjen van der Velde 81.13	5
Keanu van Velzen 84.60	3
Péter Kelemen 92.50	5
Charlie Manby 87.18	4
Nathan Potter 84.51	3
Dylan Slevin 85.65	5

Semi-finals (best of 9 legs)
Jenson Walker 89.52	2
Jurjen van der Velde 100.12	5
Péter Kelemen 81.72	3
Dylan Slevin 86.56	5

Final (best of 9 legs)
Jurjen van der Velde 95.35	5
Dylan Slevin 86.10	1

=== Development Tour 2 ===
Development Tour 2 was contested on 20 February 2026 at the Leicester Arena. The tournament was won by Sebastian Białecki, who defeated James Beeton 5–3 in the final.

Quarter-finals (best of 9 legs)
Nathan Potter 94.81	5
Jurjen van der Velde 86.10	3
Sebastian Białecki 79.55	5
Owen Bates 80.95	2
James Beeton 87.18	5
(Scotland) Patrick McShane 78.65	3
Jack Drayton 87.09	4
Dominik Grüllich 97.89	5

Semi-finals (best of 9 legs)
Nathan Potter 80.64	1
Sebastian Białecki 90.50	5
James Beeton 88.14	5
Dominik Grüllich 81.82	1

Final (best of 9 legs)
Sebastian Białecki 90.41	5
James Beeton 84.51	3

=== Development Tour 3 ===
Development Tour 3 was contested on 21 February 2026 at the Leicester Arena. The tournament was won by Jurjen van der Velde, who defeated Charlie Manby 5–3 in the final.

Quarter-finals (best of 9 legs)
Charlie Stocks 83.38	5
Henry Coates 77.60	1
Jurjen van der Velde 82.30	5
Finn Behrens 88.69	4
Charlie Manby 82.07	5
Péter Kelemen 79.92	4
Leon Weber 103.13	5
Florian Preis 87.59	1

Semi-finals (best of 9 legs)
Charlie Stocks 76.33	0
Jurjen van der Velde 89.46	5
Charlie Manby 91.65	5
Leon Weber 74.92	0

Final (best of 9 legs)
Jurjen van der Velde 97.54	5
Charlie Manby 94.96	3

=== Development Tour 4 ===
Development Tour 4 was contested on 21 February 2026 at the Leicester Arena. The tournament was won by Jack Drayton, who defeated Angelo Balsamo 5–1 in the final.

Quarter-finals (best of 9 legs)
David Fidler 80.62	5
Shane de Jong 74.16	3
Beau Greaves 92.46	4
Jack Drayton 94.94	5
Connor Hopkins 80.26	5
Nunjo Dewaele 83.91	3
Sebastian Białecki 88.18	3
Angelo Balsamo 86.46	5

Semi-finals (best of 9 legs)
David Fidler 81.82	3
Jack Drayton 88.42	5
Connor Hopkins 73.26	1
Angelo Balsamo 76.05	5

Final (best of 9 legs)
Jack Drayton 86.31	5
Angelo Balsamo 75.39	1

=== Development Tour 5 ===
Development Tour 5 was contested on 22 February 2026 at the Leicester Arena. The tournament was won by Jack Drayton, who defeated Cam Crabtree 5–3 in the final.

Quarter-finals (best of 9 legs)
Charlie Manby 82.22	2
Tyler Thorpe 85.80	5
Cayden Smith 79.55	3
Cam Crabtree 87.70	5
Dylan Slevin 80.81	3
Jack Drayton 83.59	5
(England) Archie Self 90.54	5
Dominik Grüllich 87.64	0

Semi-finals (best of 9 legs)
Tyler Thorpe 86.26	2
Cam Crabtree 88.70	5
Jack Drayton 94.48	5
(England) Archie Self 87.28	2

Final (best of 9 legs)
Cam Crabtree 89.35	3
Jack Drayton 90.67	5

== April ==
=== Development Tour 6 ===
Development Tour 6 was contested on 24 April 2026 at Arena MK in Milton Keynes. The tournament was won by James Beeton, who defeated Nathan Potter 5–4 in the final.

Quarter-finals (best of 9 legs)
(England) Archie Self 86.51	5
Charlie Manby 93.46	4
James Beeton 82.79	5
Jamai van den Herik 83.53	4
(England) Lewis Cook 74.50	2
Ryan Branley 80.98	5
Dominik Grüllich 90.42	1
Nathan Potter 98.87	5

Semi-finals (best of 9 legs)
(England) Archie Self 84.62	3
James Beeton 83.59	5
Ryan Branley 80.76	1
Nathan Potter 86.26	5

Final (best of 9 legs)
James Beeton 89.05	5
Nathan Potter 86.53	4

=== Development Tour 7 ===
Development Tour 7 was contested on 24 April 2026 at Arena MK in Milton Keynes. The tournament was won by Leon Weber, who defeated Dominik Grüllich 5–2 in the final.

Quarter-finals (best of 9 legs)
Leon Weber 96.48	5
Ieuan Halsall 85.95	2
Beau Greaves 93.46	4
Angelo Balsamo 91.66	5
Dominik Grüllich 91.98	5
(Germany) Lenny Schlüter 83.75	1
(England) Lewis Mayes 85.77	2
Tyler Thorpe 93.08	5

Semi-finals (best of 9 legs)
Leon Weber 96.35	5
Angelo Balsamo 77.96	0
Dominik Grüllich 87.84	5
Tyler Thorpe 83.08	2

Final (best of 9 legs)
Leon Weber 97.18	5
Dominik Grüllich 93.03	2

=== Development Tour 8 ===
Development Tour 8 was contested on 25 April 2026 at Arena MK in Milton Keynes. The tournament was won by Sebastian Białecki, who defeated Jack Drayton 5–2 in the final.

Quarter-finals (best of 9 legs)
Jack Drayton 97.98	5
Keenan Thomas 80.94	2
(England) Ashton Brown 81.33	3
Owen Bates 89.07	5
Bram van Dijk 89.57	5
James Beeton 83.67	1
Archie Self 97.75	3
Sebastian Białecki 93.13	5

Semi-finals (best of 9 legs)
Jack Drayton 91.07	5
Owen Bates 87.84	4
Bram van Dijk 78.59	0
Sebastian Białecki 90.54	5

Final (best of 9 legs)
Jack Drayton 91.17	2
Sebastian Białecki 92.75	5

=== Development Tour 9 ===
Development Tour 9 was contested on 25 April 2026 at Arena MK in Milton Keynes. The tournament was won by Leon Weber, who defeated Ben Townley 5–2 in the final.

Quarter-finals (best of 9 legs)
Yorick Hofkens 99.10	5
James Beeton 85.84	3
Ciaran Forde 88.48	3
(England) Ben Townley 84.98	5
Florian Preis 90.48	2
Leon Weber 90.28	5
Dominik Grüllich 86.40	5
Keenan Thomas 88.00	2

Semi-finals (best of 9 legs)
Yorick Hofkens 82.99	3
(England) Ben Townley 83.18	5
Leon Weber 86.18	5
Dominik Grüllich 84.56	2

Final (best of 9 legs)
(England) Ben Townley 85.20	2
Leon Weber 88.16	5

=== Development Tour 10 ===
Development Tour 10 was contested on 26 April 2026 at Arena MK in Milton Keynes. The tournament was won by Sebastian Białecki, who defeated Dominik Grüllich 5–4 in the final.

Quarter-finals (best of 9 legs)
Dylan Slevin 90.47	5
Henry Coates 85.56	4
Dominik Grüllich 92.33	5
Charlie Manby 93.23	4
Lewy Williams 72.27	2
(England) Lewis Cook 93.03	5
Sebastian Białecki 86.12	5
(Wales) Kai Clark 78.60	2

Semi-finals (best of 9 legs)
Dylan Slevin 80.16	1
Dominik Grüllich 89.88	5
(England) Lewis Cook 90.92	3
Sebastian Białecki 94.91	5

Final (best of 9 legs)
Dominik Grüllich 85.19	4
Sebastian Białecki 90.46	5

== June ==
=== Development Tour 11 ===
Development Tour 11 was contested on 5 June 2026 at Arena MK in Milton Keynes. The tournament was won by Sebastian Białecki, who defeated David Fidler 5–1 in the final.

Quarter-finals (best of 9 legs)
Florian Preis 96.13	5
Craig Galliano 88.17	3
Henry Coates 97.00	3
David Fidler 98.92	5
(England) Harrison Leigh 91.23	4
Jamai van den Herik 90.87	5
Sebastian Białecki 99.40	5
Cam Crabtree 99.66	2

Semi-finals (best of 9 legs)
Florian Preis 79.85	1
David Fidler 90.61	5
Jamai van den Herik 91.57	0
Sebastian Białecki 108.91	5

Final (best of 9 legs)
David Fidler 88.24	1
Sebastian Białecki 99.53	5

=== Development Tour 12 ===
Development Tour 12 was contested on 5 June 2026 at Arena MK in Milton Keynes. The tournament was won by Sebastian Białecki, who defeated Cam Crabtree 5–1 in the final.

Quarter-finals (best of 9 legs)
Sebastian Białecki 95.13	5
(Germany) Merlin Nicolaus 81.00	0
Adam Gawlas 92.60	5
Finn Behrens 92.86	2
Nunjo Dewaele 80.83	1
Ben Townley 98.27	5
Cam Crabtree 93.12	5
Jurjen van der Velde 84.48	3

Semi-finals (best of 9 legs)
Sebastian Białecki 95.19	5
Adam Gawlas 86.10	3
Ben Townley 90.12	3
Cam Crabtree 86.02	5

Final (best of 9 legs)
Sebastian Białecki 91.17	5
Cam Crabtree 85.13	1

=== Development Tour 13 ===
Development Tour 13 was contested on 6 June 2026 at Arena MK in Milton Keynes. The tournament was won by Sebastian Białecki, who defeated Leon Weber 5–2 in the final. Białecki became the first player to win four consecutive Development Tour titles.

Quarter-finals (best of 9 legs)
Sebastian Białecki 88.29	5
Florian Preis 83.20	2
David Fidler 85.40	5
Finn Behrens 73.70	0
Leon Weber 94.34	5
James Beeton 85.41	3
Thomas Banks 97.56	5
(England) Lewis Cook 96.73	4

Semi-finals (best of 9 legs)
Sebastian Białecki 96.19	5
David Fidler 84.13	1
Leon Weber 90.61	5
Thomas Banks 86.71	3

Final (best of 9 legs)
Sebastian Białecki 88.61	5
Leon Weber 77.56	2

=== Development Tour 14 ===
Development Tour 14 was contested on 6 June 2026 at Arena MK in Milton Keynes. The tournament was won by Cam Crabtree, who defeated Nathan Potter 5–4 in the final. Sebastian Białecki extended his winning streak to 38 matches, the longest in Development Tour history, before losing to Angelo Balsamo in the last 64.

Quarter-finals (best of 9 legs)
Yorick Hofkens 87.68	3
Jarod Becker 79.82	5
JJ Wright 77.58	4
Nathan Potter 82.32	5
Archie Self 95.01	5
Jamai van den Herik 88.69	3
Cole Davey 81.93	2
Cam Crabtree 89.09	3

Semi-finals (best of 9 legs)
Jarod Becker 77.36	3
Nathan Potter 81.39	5
Archie Self 99.83	1
Cam Crabtree 99.39	5

Final (best of 9 legs)
Nathan Potter 87.72	4
Cam Crabtree 91.87	5

=== Development Tour 15 ===
Development Tour 15 was contested on 7 June 2026 at Arena MK in Milton Keynes. The tournament was won by Adam Gawlas, who defeated Sebastian Białecki 5–3 in the final.

Quarter-finals (best of 9 legs)
Yorick Hofkens 84.86	1
(England) Jack Pollard 88.98	5
Adam Gawlas 83.49	5
Cam Crabtree 85.41	2
Jack Drayton 85.99	4
Sebastian Białecki 88.10	5
Jamai van den Herik 84.87	5
Jurjen van der Velde 79.76	3

Semi-finals (best of 9 legs)
(England) Jack Pollard 82.77	4
Adam Gawlas 90.78	5
Sebastian Białecki 99.72	5
Jamai van den Herik 87.52	2

Final (best of 9 legs)
Adam Gawlas 92.43	5
Sebastian Białecki 83.71	3

== July ==
=== Development Tour 16 ===
Development Tour 16 was contested on 31 July 2026 at Halle 39 in Hildesheim. The tournament was won by Owen Bates, who defeated Kaya Baysal 5–0 in the final.

Quarter-finals (best of 9 legs)
Lenny Schlüter 89.36	4
Adam Gawlas 89.53	5
Jan Schmidt 88.08	4
Owen Bates 95.07	5
Kaya Baysal 87.06	5
Jenson Walker 81.67	1
Archie Self 92.94	4
Leon Weber 88.12	5

Semi-finals (best of 9 legs)
Adam Gawlas 94.53	2
Owen Bates 101.88	5
Kaya Baysal 84.80	5
Leon Weber 88.60	4

Final (best of 9 legs)
Owen Bates 97.60	5
Kaya Baysal 85.72	0

=== Development Tour 17 ===
Development Tour 17 was contested on 31 July 2026 at Halle 39 in Hildesheim. The tournament was won by Sam Jackson, who defeated Jan Schmidt 5–3 in the final.

Quarter-finals (best of 9 legs)
Jack Drayton 89.14	4
Sam Jackson 90.06	5
Kimi Seemann 79.73	3
Owen Bates 93.00	5
(Belgium) Jenson Remory 93.44	4
Archie Self 90.11	5
Kaya Baysal 81.61	1
Jan Schmidt 86.91	5

Semi-finals (best of 9 legs)
Sam Jackson 90.78	5
Owen Bates 93.80	3
Archie Self 89.07	2
Jan Schmidt 94.36	5

Final (best of 9 legs)
Sam Jackson 93.99	5
Jan Schmidt 87.82	3

== August ==
=== Development Tour 18 ===
Development Tour 18 was contested on 1 August 2026 at Halle 39 in Hildesheim. The tournament was won by Jamai van den Herik, who defeated Angelo Balsamo 5–3 in the final.

Quarter-finals (best of 9 legs)
Sam Jackson 100.65	5
Charlie Manby 82.22	1
Cam Crabtree 79.26	1
Angelo Balsamo 88.24	5
(Belgium) Mylo Michiels 79.11	5
David Fidler 65.84	0
Owen Bates 94.73	4
Jamai van den Herik 88.49	5

Semi-finals (best of 9 legs)
Sam Jackson 80.46	1
Angelo Balsamo 99.53	5
(Belgium) Mylo Michiels 78.14	4
Jamai van den Herik 87.16	5

Final (best of 9 legs)
Angelo Balsamo 81.26	3
Jamai van den Herik 92.63	5

=== Development Tour 19 ===
Development Tour 19 was contested on 1 August 2026 at Halle 39 in Hildesheim. The tournament was won by Yorick Hofkens, who defeated Adam Gawlas 5–4 in the final.

Quarter-finals (best of 9 legs)
Adam Gawlas 90.48	5
Ieuan Halsall 84.08	2
Dylan Slevin 89.74	5
Lenny Schlüter 87.70	3
Milán Biró 78.00	0
Cam Crabtree 83.50	5
Jenson Walker 82.50	0
Yorick Hofkens 100.20	5

Semi-finals (best of 9 legs)
Adam Gawlas 102.21	5
Dylan Slevin 95.20	4
Cam Crabtree 84.83	3
Yorick Hofkens 86.35	5

Final (best of 9 legs)
Adam Gawlas 86.36	4
Yorick Hofkens 85.80	5

=== Development Tour 20 ===
Development Tour 20 was contested on 2 August 2026 at Halle 39 in Hildesheim. The tournament was won by Lenny Schlüter, who defeated Henry Coates 5–4 in the final.

Quarter-finals (best of 9 legs)
(Slovakia) Martin Homola 80.19	3
Sean McKeon 82.69	5
Dylan Slevin 86.65	3
Henry Coates 89.41	5
Kaya Baysal 83.52	1
(Belgium) Mylo Michiels 77.89	5
Lenny Schlüter 90.00	5
(Netherlands) Angelo Vroomen 81.86	1

Semi-finals (best of 9 legs)
Sean McKeon 91.04	4
Henry Coates 93.91	5
(Belgium) Mylo Michiels 85.83	1
Lenny Schlüter 94.34	5

Final (best of 9 legs)
Henry Coates 87.86	4
Lenny Schlüter 81.00	5

== October ==
=== Development Tour 21 ===
Development Tour 21 was contested on 3 October 2026 at Robin Park in Wigan. The tournament was won by Nunjo Dewaele, who defeated Cole Davey 5–4 in the final.

Quarter-finals (best of 9 legs)
Jamai van den Herik 88.41	5
Ben Townley 81.15	0
Cole Davey 87.99	5
Tyler Thorpe 96.18	4
Nunjo Dewaele 76.86	5
Dylan Slevin 80.85	3
Charlie Stocks 77.25	1
(Scotland) Connor Mitchell 95.68	5

Semi-finals (best of 9 legs)
Jamai van den Herik 90.04	4
Cole Davey 88.32	5
Nunjo Dewaele 80.95	5
(Scotland) Connor Mitchell 80.14	2

Final (best of 9 legs)
Cole Davey 86.38	4
Nunjo Dewaele 83.31	5

=== Development Tour 22 ===
Development Tour 22 was contested on 3 October 2026 at Robin Park in Wigan. The tournament was won by Archie Self, who defeated Sam Jackson 5–2 in the final.

Quarter-finals (best of 9 legs)
Nathan Potter 99.62	5
Kaya Baysal 100.62	3
Dominik Grüllich 96.59	4
Archie Self 97.83	5
Dylan Slevin 86.01	5
Jamai van den Herik 82.53	2
Owen Bates 84.78	4
Sam Jackson 89.98	5

Semi-finals (best of 9 legs)
Nathan Potter 85.97	3
Archie Self 98.92	5
Dylan Slevin 88.37	2
Sam Jackson 98.35	5

Final (best of 9 legs)
Archie Self 91.64	5
Sam Jackson 95.57	2

=== Development Tour 23 ===
Development Tour 23 was contested on 4 October 2026 at Robin Park in Wigan. The tournament was won by Henry Coates, who defeated Owen Bates 5–1 in the final.

Quarter-finals (best of 9 legs)
Jamai van den Herik 90.91	5
Kaya Baysal 93.98	3
Owen Bates 92.81	5
Ansh Sood 86.38	1
Tyler Thorpe 96.14	5
Archie Self 90.83	2
Henry Coates 85.07	5
Keanu van Velzen 81.30	3

Semi-finals (best of 9 legs)
Jamai van den Herik 83.60	2
Owen Bates 96.76	5
Tyler Thorpe 74.37	3
Henry Coates 92.58	5

Final (best of 9 legs)
Owen Bates 89.55	1
Henry Coates 97.41	5

=== Development Tour 24 ===
Development Tour 24 will be contested on 4 October 2026 at Robin Park in Wigan. The tournament was won by Kaya Baysal, who defeated Jurjen van der Velde 5-3 in the final.

Quarter-finals (best of 9 legs)
Jurjen van der Velde 80.51	5
Dylan Slevin 82.01	1
Duyane-Wade Decena 76.21	5
Dominik Grüllich 74.07	4
Tyler Thorpe 78.69	1
Owen Bates 81.94	5
(France) Damien Decla 87.93	3
Kaya Baysal 89.79	5

Semi-finals (best of 9 legs)
Jurjen van der Velde 75.32	5
Duyane-Wade Decena 78.88	1
Owen Bates 80.19	4
Kaya Baysal 87.19	5

Final (best of 9 legs)
Jurjen van der Velde 80.01	3
Kaya Baysal 86.15	5
