= 2026 PDC Women's Series =

Series of darts tournaments

The 2026 PDC Women's Series is a series of non-televised women's darts tournaments organised by the Professional Darts Corporation (PDC). A secondary tour to the 2026 PDC Pro Tour, the seventh edition of the PDC Women's Series consists of 24 tournaments played over six weekends of four events each. All female players who are outside of the top 64 of the PDC Order of Merit, or are at least 16 years of age on the cut-off date of a Women's Series event, are eligible to compete in the Women's Series.

In early April 2026, the Darts Regulation Authority, which governs the PDC, banned trans women from competing in women's events with immediate effect after they commissioned a report by Dr Emma Hilton about gender differences in darts.

== Order of Merit ==
According to the PDC's Order of Merit rules, the Women's Series prizes are as follows:

- The top three players on the Women's Series Order of Merit, who have not obtained qualification via another method, receive a place in the first round of the 2027 PDC World Darts Championship.
- The top player on the Women's Series Order of Merit, who has not qualified via another method, receives a place at the 2026 Grand Slam of Darts.
- The players in the top eight of the Women's Series Order of Merit, who have not obtained a PDC Tour Card before the Qualifying School (Q-School), receive free entry to the 2027 edition of Q-School.

Additionally, earnings from Women's Series events held in late 2025 and early 2026 count towards the Women's World Matchplay Order of Merit. PDC Tour Card holder Beau Greaves and the next seven highest-ranked players on this ranking qualify for the 2026 Women's World Matchplay, a televised tournament held concurrently with the 2026 World Matchplay. The Women's World Matchplay is an additional qualification route to major tournaments, with the winner qualifying for the 2026 Grand Slam of Darts and 2027 PDC World Darts Championship.

2026 Women's Series ranking top 10 (As of 10 October 2026)
Rank	Player	Prize money
1	Beau Greaves (ENG)	£44,700
2	Lisa Ashton (ENG)	£18,700
3	Fallon Sherrock (ENG)	£14,150
4	Gemma Hayter (ENG)	£11,400
5	Vicky Pruim (SWE)	£9,200
6	Deta Hedman (ENG)	£7,300
7	Jade Gofford (ENG)	£7,100
8	Trina Gulliver (ENG)	£6,700
9	Kirsi Viinikaninen (FIN)	£6,500
10	Rhian O'Sullivan (WAL)	£6,500

== Prize money ==
The total prize money for Women's Series events in 2026 increased to £15,000 per event from a previous total of £10,000 in 2025. The winner of each event receives £2,500. The prize fund breakdown is:

Stage (no. of players)		Prize money (Total: £15,000)
Winner	(1)	£2,500
Runner-up	(1)	£1,000
Semi-finalists	(2)	£750
Quarter-finalists	(4)	£500
Last 16	(8)	£300
Last 32	(16)	£200
Last 64 (Note: Prize money for reaching the last 64 on the Women's Series is awarded only when there at least 128 participants.)	(32)	£75

== February ==
=== Women's Series 1 ===
Women's Series 1 was contested on Saturday 7 February 2026 at Halle 39 in Hildesheim. The tournament was won by Beau Greaves, who won her 47th Women's Series title by defeating Lisa Ashton 5–2 in the final.

Quarter-finals (best of 9 legs)
Beau Greaves 89.25	5
Fallon Sherrock 86.37	2
Vicky Pruim 71.59	4
Robyn Byrne 70.44	5
Silvia Lindner 61.19	2
Steph Clarke 63.18	5
Aoife McCormack 77.23	1
Lisa Ashton 79.43	5

Semi-finals (best of 9 legs)
Beau Greaves 82.58	5
Robyn Byrne 74.93	0
Steph Clarke 75.63	1
Lisa Ashton 90.74	5

Final (best of 9 legs)
Beau Greaves 98.43	5
Lisa Ashton 92.61	2

=== Women's Series 2 ===
Women's Series 2 was contested on Saturday 7 February 2026 at Halle 39 in Hildesheim. The tournament was won by Beau Greaves, who defeated Lisa Ashton 5–0 in the final. By winning the final, Greaves achieved her 100th consecutive win on the Women's Series.

Quarter-finals (best of 9 legs)
Beau Greaves 87.50	5
Jade Gofford 81.48	3
Gemma Hayter 72.87	5
Trina Gulliver 65.56	2
Natalie Gilbert 73.86	5
Steph Clarke 75.40	3
Angela Kirkwood 77.44	3
Lisa Ashton 76.11	5

Semi-finals (best of 9 legs)
Beau Greaves 93.14	5
Gemma Hayter 81.47	2
Natalie Gilbert 73.61	2
Lisa Ashton 77.34	5

Final (best of 9 legs)
Beau Greaves 89.46	5
Lisa Ashton 75.48	0

=== Women's Series 3 ===
Women's Series 3 was contested on Sunday 8 February 2026 at Halle 39 in Hildesheim. The tournament was won by Beau Greaves, who defeated Fallon Sherrock 5–1 in the final.

Quarter-finals (best of 9 legs)
Rhian O'Sullivan 73.09	3
Deta Hedman 69.92	5
Beau Greaves 98.70	5
Lisa Ashton 89.72	1
Denise Cassidy 65.54	5
Trina Gulliver 65.00	4
Fallon Sherrock 87.66	5
Jade Gofford 83.16	2

Semi-finals (best of 9 legs)
Deta Hedman 70.63	0
Beau Greaves 90.54	5
Denise Cassidy 76.77	4
Fallon Sherrock 82.96	5

Final (best of 9 legs)
Beau Greaves 86.39	5
Fallon Sherrock 76.08	1

=== Women's Series 4 ===
Women's Series 4 was contested on Sunday 8 February 2026 at Halle 39 in Hildesheim. The tournament was won by Beau Greaves, who defeated Lisa Ashton 5–0 in the final. Greaves ended the opening weekend of the 2026 Women's Series with her 17th consecutive title, extending her unbeaten streak to 113 matches.

Quarter-finals (best of 9 legs)
Rhian O'Sullivan 75.72	5
Steph Clarke 71.35	2
Robyn Byrne 71.08	2
Lisa Ashton 78.45	5
Joanne Oldershaw 65.48	3
Angela Kirkwood 68.03	5
Beau Greaves 95.47	5
Fallon Sherrock 95.93	4

Semi-finals (best of 9 legs)
Rhian O'Sullivan 77.07	4
Lisa Ashton 72.86	5
Angela Kirkwood 73.79	0
Beau Greaves 86.38	5

Final (best of 9 legs)
Lisa Ashton 75.92	0
Beau Greaves 100.20	5

== March ==
=== Women's Series 5 ===
Women's Series 5 was contested on Saturday 21 March 2026 at the Robin Park Leisure Centre in Wigan. Beau Greaves' 114-match winning streak ended during this event as she lost 4–1 to Fallon Sherrock in the second round. The tournament was won by Lisa Ashton, who defeated Sherrock 5–3 in the final.

Quarter-finals (best of 9 legs)
Kirsi Viinikainen 80.40	4
Lisa Ashton 83.36	5
Aileen de Graaf 86.12	3
Gemma Hayter 90.64	5
Fallon Sherrock 82.58	5
(England) Vicky Martin 63.00	0
Robyn Byrne 72.20	5
Vicky Pruim 73.52	3

Semi-finals (best of 9 legs)
Lisa Ashton 85.45	5
Gemma Hayter 68.80	2
Fallon Sherrock 86.81	5
Robyn Byrne 84.27	4

Final (best of 9 legs)
Lisa Ashton 90.32	5
Fallon Sherrock 88.46	3

=== Women's Series 6 ===
Women's Series 6 was contested on Saturday 21 March 2026 at the Robin Park Leisure Centre in Wigan. The tournament was won by Beau Greaves, who defeated Gemma Hayter 5–0 in the final.

Quarter-finals (best of 9 legs)
Robyn Byrne 70.47	5
Steph Clarke 67.73	4
Beau Greaves 80.81	5
Eleanor Cairns 70.21	0
Leanne Topper 75.07	1
Noa-Lynn van Leuven 99.89	5
Gemma Hayter 75.15	5
Fallon Sherrock 71.88	0

Semi-finals (best of 9 legs)
Robyn Byrne 72.80	2
Beau Greaves 89.82	5
Noa-Lynn van Leuven 75.76	1
Gemma Hayter 77.92	5

Final (best of 9 legs)
Beau Greaves 101.55	5
Gemma Hayter 80.21	0

=== Women's Series 7 ===
Women's Series 7 was contested on Saturday 22 March 2026 at the Robin Park Leisure Centre in Wigan. The tournament was won by Beau Greaves, who defeated Fallon Sherrock 5–4 in the final.

Quarter-finals (best of 9 legs)
Kim Holden 76.59	2
Fallon Sherrock 94.22	5
Gemma Hayter 80.57	4
Lisa Ashton 81.36	5
Felicia Blay 72.66	3
Jo Locke 72.71	5
Beau Greaves 86.21	5
Steph Clarke 69.23	1

Semi-finals (best of 9 legs)
Fallon Sherrock 96.18	5
Lisa Ashton 90.99	4
Jo Locke 77.20	0
Beau Greaves 100.20	5

Final (best of 9 legs)
Fallon Sherrock 95.98	4
Beau Greaves 99.16	5

=== Women's Series 8 ===
Women's Series 8 was contested on Saturday 22 March 2026 at the Robin Park Leisure Centre in Wigan. The tournament was won by Beau Greaves, who defeated Rhian O'Sullivan 5–1 in the final.

Quarter-finals (best of 9 legs)
Lauryn Salter 73.60	0
Rhian O'Sullivan 79.11	5
Gemma Hayter 82.67	5
Leanne Topper 76.28	4
Louise Pearson 58.02	1
Laura Turner 58.03	5
Deta Hedman 80.34	2
Beau Greaves 90.34	5

Semi-finals (best of 9 legs)
Rhian O'Sullivan 84.17	5
Gemma Hayter 74.85	3
Laura Turner 61.18	0
Beau Greaves 86.38	5

Final (best of 9 legs)
Rhian O'Sullivan 80.87	1
Beau Greaves 92.60	5

== May ==
=== Women's Series 9 ===
Women's Series 9 was contested on Saturday 16 May 2026 at the Leicester Arena. The tournament was won by Beau Greaves, who defeated Trina Gulliver 5–1 in the final.

Quarter-finals (best of 9 legs)
Trina Gulliver 61.75	5
(England) Shannon Reeve 59.34	1
Jo Locke 72.33	3
Karolina Ratajska 74.96	5
Lorraine Winstanley 67.97	0
Beau Greaves 87.38	5
Lisa Ashton 88.76	5
Kirsi Viinikainen 84.51	3

Semi-finals (best of 9 legs)
Trina Gulliver 77.44	5
Karolina Ratajska 74.96	4
Beau Greaves 95.61	5
Lisa Ashton 85.87	1

Final (best of 9 legs)
Trina Gulliver 77.97	1
Beau Greaves 88.35	5

=== Women's Series 10 ===
Women's Series 10 was contested on Saturday 16 May 2026 at the Leicester Arena. The tournament was won by Beau Greaves, who defeated Karolina Ratajska 5–1 in the final.

Quarter-finals (best of 9 legs)
Vicky Pruim 75.47	4
Karolina Ratajska 72.05	5
Gemma Hayter 79.98	5
Kim Holden 75.47	1
Lisa Ashton 82.28	5
Lorraine Winstanley 77.52	1
Deta Hedman 88.05	4
Beau Greaves 88.53	5

Semi-finals (best of 9 legs)
Karolina Ratajska 76.49	5
Gemma Hayter 76.63	3
Lisa Ashton 85.92	1
Beau Greaves 94.98	5

Final (best of 9 legs)
Karolina Ratajska 79.08	1
Beau Greaves 93.57	5

=== Women's Series 11 ===
Women's Series 11 was contested on Sunday 17 May 2026 at the Leicester Arena. The tournament was won by Deta Hedman, who defeated Kirsi Viinikainen 5–3 in the final.

Quarter-finals (best of 9 legs)
Kirsi Viinikainen 79.95	5
Lauren Bloomfield 63.93	0
Joanne Oldershaw 64.49	5
Eleanor Cairns 65.50	1
Beau Greaves 88.70	4
Rhian O'Sullivan 83.36	5
Deta Hedman 84.97	5
Lisa Ashton 80.05	3

Semi-finals (best of 9 legs)
Kirsi Viinikainen 79.45	5
Joanne Oldershaw 66.18	3
Rhian O'Sullivan 72.42	3
Deta Hedman 84.60	5

Final (best of 9 legs)
Kirsi Viinikainen 76.32	3
Deta Hedman 89.21	5

=== Women's Series 12 ===
Women's Series 12 was contested on Sunday 17 May 2026 at the Leicester Arena. The tournament was won by Vicky Pruim, who defeated Gemma Hayter 5–1 in the final.

Quarter-finals (best of 9 legs)
Karolina Ratajska 76.90	2
Vicky Pruim 82.62	5
Kyana Frauenfelder 63.89	4
Lauryn Salter 64.39	5
Deta Hedman 75.09	5
Fallon Sherrock 71.09	4
Beau Greaves 83.03	4
Gemma Hayter 85.38	5

Semi-finals (best of 9 legs)
Vicky Pruim 81.83	5
Lauryn Salter 71.68	3
Deta Hedman 73.31	1
Gemma Hayter 79.14	5

Final (best of 9 legs)
Vicky Pruim 72.48	5
Gemma Hayter 65.35	2

== June ==
=== Women's Series 13 ===
Women's Series 13 was contested on Saturday 20 June 2026 at the Robin Park Leisure Centre. The tournament was won by Beau Greaves who defeated Vicky Pruim 5–0 in the final.

Quarter-finals (best of 9 legs)
Jade Gofford 67.81	5
Katie Sheldon 66.79	4
Beau Greaves 92.79	5
Fallon Sherrock 81.06	2
Vicky Pruim 73.28	5
Trina Gulliver 65.47	2
Aileen de Graaf 73.52	5
Louise Pearson 64.86	4

Semi-finals (best of 9 legs)
Beau Greaves 87.76	5
Jade Gofford 74.62	3
Vicky Pruim 83.70	5
Aileen de Graaf 79.44	2

Final (best of 9 legs)
Beau Greaves 88.41	5
Vicky Pruim 75.07	0

=== Women's Series 14 ===
Women's Series 14 was contested on Saturday 20 June 2026 at the Robin Park Leisure Centre. The tournament was won by Beau Greaves who defeated Karolina Ratajska 5–1 in the final.

Quarter-finals (best of 9 legs)
Sue Lowther 69.04	5
Angela Kirkwood 66.95	3
Karolina Ratajska 74.28	5
Trina Gulliver 71.71	4
Aileen de Graaf 77.23	5
Louise Pearson 69.83	2
Beau Greaves 78.94	5
Aoife McCormack 71.79	3

Semi-finals (best of 9 legs)
Karolina Ratajska 73.57	5
Sue Lowther 66.24	2
Beau Greaves 100.20	5
Aileen de Graaf 78.42	0

Final (best of 9 legs)
Beau Greaves 82.05	5
Karolina Ratajska 70.17	1

=== Women's Series 15 ===
Women's Series 15 was contested on Sunday 21 June 2026 at the Robin Park Leisure Centre. The tournament was won by Lisa Ashton who defeated Beau Greaves 5–1 in the final.

Quarter-finals (best of 9 legs)
Kirsi Viinikainen 83.27	5
Steph Clarke 73.99	1
Holly Glet 73.86	1
Lisa Ashton 82.94	5
Beau Greaves 80.60	5
Aurora Fochesato 78.08	2
Fallon Sherrock 77.57	5
Vicky Pruim 73.93	1

Semi-finals (best of 9 legs)
Kirsi Viinikainen 79.24	1
Lisa Ashton 83.83	5
Beau Greaves 88.67	5
Fallon Sherrock 81.90	3

Final (best of 9 legs)
Lisa Ashton 82.04	5
Beau Greaves 79.25	1

=== Women's Series 16 ===
Women's Series 16 was contested on Sunday 21 June 2026 at the Robin Park Leisure Centre. The tournament was won by Eleanor Cairns who defeated Angela Kirkwood 5–4 in the final.

Quarter-finals (best of 9 legs)
Vicky Pruim 72.79	5
Joanne Oldershaw 69.00	4
Eleanor Cairns 71.63	5
Steph Clarke 72.23	3
Angela Kirkwood 70.41	5
Fallon Sherrock 70.17	3
Karolina Ratajska 71.40	4
Emma Martin 71.03	5

Semi-finals (best of 9 legs)
Vicky Pruim 75.27	2
Eleanor Cairns 74.20	5
Angela Kirkwood 74.22	5
Emma Martin 66.04	2

Final (best of 9 legs)
Eleanor Cairns 79.67	5
Angela Kirkwood 76.38	4

== August ==
=== Women's Series 17 ===
Women's Series 17 was contested on 22 August 2026 at the Leicester Arena. The tournament was won by Lisa Ashton who defeated Lauryn Salter 5–0 in the final.

Quarter-finals (best of 9 legs)
Emma Pearce 67.08	2
Lauryn Salter 67.98	5
Jade Gofford 77.41	5
Sue Lowther 70.13	2
Lisa Ashton 83.72	5
Grace Ferridge 69.54	1
Gemma Hayter 80.51	5
Aileen de Graaf 81.63	3

Semi-finals (best of 9 legs)
Lauryn Salter 68.17	5
Jade Gofford 69.87	4
Lisa Ashton 74.93	5
Gemma Hayter 81.02	4

Final (best of 9 legs)
Lauryn Salter 62.86	0
Lisa Ashton 67.70	5

=== Women's Series 18 ===
Women's Series 18 was contested on 22 August 2026 at the Leicester Arena. The tournament was won by Fallon Sherrock who defeated Lisa Ashton 5–0 in the final.

Quarter-finals (best of 9 legs)
Tracey Dean 65.37	2
Karolina Ratajska 75.33	5
Lisa Ashton 81.28	5
Trina Gulliver 74.24	1
Gemma Hayter 76.50	5
Kirsty Hutchinson 60.90	1
Aoife McCormack 58.55	0
Fallon Sherrock 81.68	5

Semi-finals (best of 9 legs)
Karolina Ratajska 70.92	3
Lisa Ashton 71.13	5
Gemma Hayter 79.28	3
Fallon Sherrock 79.42	5

Final (best of 9 legs)
Lisa Ashton 61.38	0
Fallon Sherrock 81.68	5

=== Women's Series 19 ===
Women's Series 19 was contested on 23 August 2026 at the Leicester Arena. The tournament was won by Beau Greaves who defeated Lisa Ashton 5–3 in the final.

Quarter-finals (best of 9 legs)
Lauren Bloomfield 67.06	4
Jo Locke 70.70	5
Angela Kirkwood 68.00	0
Lisa Ashton 81.68	5
Kirsty Hutchinson 72.63	5
Joanne Oldershaw 75.29	3
Beau Greaves 96.30	5
Aileen de Graaf 81.17	1

Semi-finals (best of 9 legs)
Jo Locke 69.41	0
Lisa Ashton 90.54	5
Kirsty Hutchinson 64.81	2
Beau Greaves 78.25	5

Final (best of 9 legs)
Lisa Ashton 81.28	3
Beau Greaves 84.55	5

=== Women's Series 20 ===
Women's Series 20 was contested on 23 August 2026 at the Leicester Arena. The tournament was won by Beau Greaves who defeated Aileen de Graaf 5–0 in the final.

Quarter-finals (best of 9 legs)
Fallon Sherrock 72.67	3
Aileen de Graaf 77.48	5
Jo Locke 76.86	5
Deta Hedman 78.35	3
Gemma Hayter 81.45	3
Karolina Ratajska 78.67	5
Angela Kirkwood 72.56	0
Beau Greaves 75.15	5

Semi-finals (best of 9 legs)
Aileen de Graaf 66.89	5
Jo Locke 65.75	1
Karolina Ratajska 81.41	1
Beau Greaves 89.20	5

Final (best of 9 legs)
Aileen de Graaf 60.81	0
Beau Greaves 91.65	5

== October ==
=== Women's Series 21 ===
Women's Series 21 was contested on 10 October 2026 at the Robin Park Leisure Center in Wigan. The tournament was won by Beau Greaves who defeated Vicky Pruim 5–3 in the final.

Quarter-finals (best of 9 legs)
Lauren Bloomfield 66.79	1
Kirsi Viinikainen 69.38	5
Vicky Pruim 77.29	5
Lisa Ashton 78.23	4
Rhian O'Sullivan 76.08	0
Beau Greaves 101.55	5
Gemma Hayter 81.62	4
Fallon Sherrock 85.27	5

Semi-finals (best of 9 legs)
Kirsi Viinikainen 73.28	2
Vicky Pruim 76.35	5
Beau Greaves 79.95	5
Fallon Sherrock 73.03	0

Final (best of 9 legs)
Vicky Pruim 78.34	3
Beau Greaves 84.50	5

=== Women's Series 22 ===
Women's Series 22 was contested on 10 October 2026 at the Robin Park Leisure Center in Wigan. The tournament was won by Beau Greaves who defeated Gemma Hayter 5–3 in the final.

Quarter-finals (best of 9 legs)
Gemma Hayter 79.60	5
Aoife McCormack 71.34	4
Aurora Fochesato 80.81	5
Fallon Sherrock 75.48	1
Leanne Topper 70.38	5
Angela Kirkwood 70.40	4
Joanne Oldershaw 65.13	0
Beau Greaves 75.91	5

Semi-finals (best of 9 legs)
Gemma Hayter 78.08	5
Aurora Fochesato 71.61	3
Leanne Topper 75.23	1
Beau Greaves 84.06	5

Final (best of 9 legs)
Gemma Hayter 90.51	3
Beau Greaves 92.44	5

=== Women's Series 23 ===
Women's Series 23 was contested on 11 October 2026 at the Robin Park Leisure Center in Wigan. The tournament was won by Beau Greaves who defeated Jade Gofford 5–3 in the final.

Quarter-finals (best of 9 legs)
Rhian O'Sullivan 84.02	4
Jade Gofford 84.74	5
Denise Cassidy 66.37	0
Lisa Ashton 79.11	5
Beau Greaves 94.10	5
Gemma Hayter 88.60	2
Fallon Sherrock 82.31	5
Trina Gulliver 73.73	3

Semi-finals (best of 9 legs)
Jade Gofford 82.33	5
Lisa Ashton 76.07	2
Beau Greaves 102.56	5
Fallon Sherrock 85.82	1

Final (best of 9 legs)
Jade Gofford 79.14	3
Beau Greaves 101.59	5

=== Women's Series 24 ===
Women's Series 24 was contested on 11 October 2026 at the Robin Park Leisure Center in Wigan. The tournament was won by Beau Greaves who defeated Aurora Fochesato 5–2 in the final.

Quarter-finals (best of 9 legs)
Beau Greaves 94.91	5
Rebecca Allen 69.65	1
Kirsty Hutchinson 68.38	5
Kyana Frauenfelder 63.57	1
Fallon Sherrock 71.57	4
Vicky Pruim 74.67	5
Aoife McCormack 69.73	2
Aurora Fochesato 69.17	5

Semi-finals (best of 9 legs)
Beau Greaves 96.35	5
Kirsty Hutchinson 68.48	0
Vicky Pruim 68.46	4
Aurora Fochesato 74.26	5

Final (best of 9 legs)
Beau Greaves 79.28	5
Aurora Fochesato 70.97	2
