= 2026 PDC Challenge Tour =

Series of darts tournaments

The 2026 PDC Challenge Tour, known as the Winmau Challenge Tour for sponsorship reasons, is a series of non-televised darts tournaments organised by the Professional Darts Corporation (PDC). A secondary tour to the 2026 PDC Pro Tour, it consists of 24 tournaments, held over four weekends of five events and one weekend of four events. The Challenge Tour, sponsored by Winmau, is the PDC's second-tier system for players who competed at the 2026 Qualifying Schools (Q-School) but did not win a PDC Tour Card.

== Order of Merit ==
Under PDC Order of Merit Rule 4.2, the Challenge Tour Order of Merit rankings are used to determine reserve players for Players Championship events up to 128 entries, when any of the 2026 Tour Card holders are not present.

According to the PDC's Order of Merit rules, the 2026 Challenge Tour prizes are as follows:

- The top two players on the Challenge Tour Order of Merit, who have not obtained a PDC Tour Card via another method, win a two-year Tour Card for the 2027 and 2028 seasons.
- The top three players on the Challenge Tour Order of Merit, who had not qualified via another method, qualified for places at the 2027 PDC World Championship.
- The highest ranked player on the Challenge Tour Order of Merit receives a spot at the 2026 Grand Slam of Darts.
- The players in the top 16 of the Challenge Tour Order of Merit, who have not obtained a PDC Tour Card before 2027 Q-School, are granted free entry to the final stage of Q–School.
- The eight highest ranked players from the Challenge Tour Order of Merit, who do not earn a Tour Card for the 2027 season, qualified for the first round of the 2027 UK Open.

2026 Challenge Tour ranking top 16 (as of 27 September 2026)
Rank	Player	Prize money
1	Joe Hunt (ENG)	£20,400
2	Derek Coulson (WAL)	£15,500
3	Tommy Morris (ENG)	£12,450
4	Daniel Klose (GER)	£12,250
5	Archie Self (ENG)	£9,500
6	Tommy Lishman (ENG)	£8,950
7	Jack Aldridge (ENG)	£8,150
8	Jack Tweddell (ENG)	£8,050
9	Daniel Ayres (ENG)	£7,750
10	Aden Kirk (ENG)	£7,450
11	Harry Ward (ENG)	£7,350
12	Steve Lennon (IRL)	£7,250
13	Henry Coates (ENG)	£7,000
14	Patrik Williams (ENG)	£6,600
15	Nathan Potter (ENG)	£6,300
16	Martijn Dragt (NED)	£6,150

== January ==
=== Challenge Tour 1 ===
Challenge Tour 1 was contested on 16 January 2026 at the Arena MK in Milton Keynes. The tournament was won by Tommy Lishman, who defeated Tommy Morris 5–2 in the final.

Quarter-finals (best of 9 legs)
Nathan Potter 89.10	3
Derek Coulson 93.98	5
Jenson Walker 80.26	0
Tommy Morris 107.36	5
Lewis Pride 91.73	5
Jack Aldridge 90.86	1
Luke Smith 80.39	3
Tommy Lishman 92.18	5

Semi-finals (best of 9 legs)
Derek Coulson 93.61	4
Tommy Morris 90.72	5
Lewis Pride 88.10	4
Tommy Lishman 92.41	5

Final (best of 9 legs)
Tommy Morris 98.52	2
Tommy Lishman 99.12	5

=== Challenge Tour 2 ===
Challenge Tour 2 was contested on 16 January 2026 at the Arena MK in Milton Keynes. The tournament was won by Joe Hunt, who defeated José Justicia 5–2 in the final.

Quarter-finals (best of 9 legs)
Christopher Wickenden 90.64	4
Dylan Dowling 80.33	5
Joe Hunt 93.75	5
Jenson Walker 90.92	2
José Justicia 79.59	5
Jamie Kay 87.70	2
Scott Campbell 88.77	2
Martijn Dragt 101.80	5

Semi-finals (best of 9 legs)
Dylan Dowling 81.63	1
Joe Hunt 94.29	5
José Justicia 88.44	5
Martijn Dragt 85.51	2

Final (best of 9 legs)
Joe Hunt 99.49	5
José Justicia 90.20	2

=== Challenge Tour 3 ===
Challenge Tour 3 was contested on 17 January 2026 at the Arena MK in Milton Keynes. The tournament was won by Joe Hunt, who defeated Arron Monk 5–2 in the final.

Quarter-finals (best of 9 legs)
Daniel Ayres 86.18	4
Derek Coulson 82.73	5
Arron Monk 76.58	5
Ryan Branley 76.57	1
Alan Norris 88.90	5
Cayden Smith 81.00	3
Steve Beaton 87.16	2
Joe Hunt 85.10	5

Semi-finals (best of 9 legs)
Derek Coulson 84.64	3
Arron Monk 83.73	5
Alan Norris 82.63	2
Joe Hunt 89.92	5

Final (best of 9 legs)
Arron Monk 80.40	2
Joe Hunt 88.04	5

=== Challenge Tour 4 ===
Challenge Tour 4 was contested on 17 January 2026 at the Arena MK in Milton Keynes. The tournament was won by Martijn Dragt, who defeated Scott Waites 5–3 in the final.

Quarter-finals (best of 9 legs)
Steve Lennon 93.94	5
Daniel Smith 65.08	0
Gary Jackson 93.64	2
Martijn Dragt 94.29	5
Scott Waites 96.16	5
Danny Trueman 84.14	1
Keenan Thomas 87.69	2
Simon Stevenson 93.94	5

Semi-finals (best of 9 legs)
Steve Lennon 80.51	2
Martijn Dragt 82.46	5
Scott Waites 91.31	5
Simon Stevenson 87.53	3

Final (best of 9 legs)
Martijn Dragt 88.23	5
Scott Waites 88.38	3

=== Challenge Tour 5 ===
Challenge Tour 5 was contested on 18 January 2026 at the Arena MK in Milton Keynes. The tournament was won by Jack Tweddell, who defeated Steve Lennon 5–1 in the final.

Quarter-finals (best of 9 legs)
Steve Hine 79.25	3
Jack Tweddell 82.77	5
Jimmy Bristow 73.40	5
Ashley Coleman 75.13	4
Tommy Morris 82.45	1
Henry Coates 87.95	5
Graham Hall 82.20	3
Steve Lennon 84.57	5

Semi-finals (best of 9 legs)
Jack Tweddell 88.51	5
Jimmy Bristow 87.30	4
Henry Coates 88.09	2
Steve Lennon 94.68	5

Final (best of 9 legs)
Jack Tweddell 85.68	5
Steve Lennon 84.06	1

== April ==
=== Challenge Tour 6 ===
Challenge Tour 6 was contested on 27 March 2026 at the Mattioli Arena in Leicester. The tournament was won by Derek Coulson, who defeated Oliver Mitchell 5–0 in the final.

Quarter-finals (best of 9 legs)
Andy Hamilton 92.34	5
(England) James Howard Hughes 85.31	2
Derek Coulson 97.57	5
Adrian Gray 93.82	2
Daniel Ayres 90.77	2
Oliver Mitchell 91.40	5
Gilbert van der Meijden 93.27	5
Michele Turetta 88.72	3

Semi-finals (best of 9 legs)
Andy Hamilton 88.13	2
Derek Coulson 99.99	5
Oliver Mitchell 93.17	5
Gilbert van der Meijden 85.93	3

Final (best of 9 legs)
Derek Coulson 93.94	5
Oliver Mitchell 77.88	0

=== Challenge Tour 7 ===
Challenge Tour 7 was contested on 27 March 2026 at the Mattioli Arena in Leicester. The tournament was won by Daniel Klose, who defeated Callum Goffin 5–3 in the final.

Quarter-finals (best of 9 legs)
Daniel Klose 79.81	5
(England) Andy Courtney 80.97	2
(England) Ben Townley 86.33	5
Tommy Lishman 81.76	2
(England) William Leonard 95.84	3
Callum Goffin 100.91	5
Jamai van den Herik 84.20	4
(England) Archie Self 96.29	5

Semi-finals (best of 9 legs)
Daniel Klose 83.84	5
(England) Ben Townley 82.13	4
Callum Goffin 86.84	5
(England) Archie Self 91.96	2

Final (best of 9 legs)
Daniel Klose 87.88	5
Callum Goffin 80.89	3

=== Challenge Tour 8 ===
Challenge Tour 8 was contested on 28 March 2026 at the Mattioli Arena in Leicester. The tournament was won by Ted Evetts, who defeated Aden Kirk 5–4 in the final.

Quarter-finals (best of 9 legs)
Derek Coulson 93.94	5
Bruno Stöckli 80.42	0
Jack Aldridge 101.92	4
Ted Evetts 102.89	5
Aden Kirk 95.28	5
Matthew Dennant 88.74	4
Graham Usher 83.03	5
Michele Turetta 85.28	4

Semi-finals (best of 9 legs)
Derek Coulson 93.05	4
Ted Evetts 97.67	5
Aden Kirk 94.61	5
Graham Usher 90.93	4

Final (best of 9 legs)
Ted Evetts 86.61	5
Aden Kirk 84.98	4

=== Challenge Tour 9 ===
Challenge Tour 9 was contested on 28 March 2026 at the Mattioli Arena in Leicester. The tournament was won by Florian Preis, who defeated Lewis Pride 5–4 in the final.

Quarter-finals (best of 9 legs)
Llew Bevan 84.12	5
Danny Trueman 87.34	4
Aden Kirk 91.78	5
James Beeton 82.91	1
Lewis Pride 91.51	5
Steve Haggerty 83.96	4
Florian Preis 95.81	5
Joe Hunt 95.32	1

Semi-finals (best of 9 legs)
Llew Bevan 77.62	4
Aden Kirk 83.37	5
Lewis Pride 79.22	1
Florian Preis 88.99	5

Final (best of 9 legs)
Aden Kirk 87.85	4
Florian Preis 86.71	5

=== Challenge Tour 10 ===
Challenge Tour 10 was contested on 29 March 2026 at the Mattioli Arena in Leicester. The tournament was won by Nathan Potter, who defeated Radek Szagański 5–1 in the final.

Quarter-finals (best of 9 legs)
Radek Szagański 95.84	5
Harry Ward 92.34	4
Tommy Lishman 90.54	4
(England) Danny Goddard 86.31	5
Nathan Potter 104.13	5
Jack Aldridge 95.84	2
Derek Coulson 88.41	5
Keegan Brown 75.04	0

Semi-finals (best of 9 legs)
Radek Szagański 82.58	5
(England) Danny Goddard 75.57	0
Nathan Potter 98.88	5
Derek Coulson 97.89	2

Final (best of 9 legs)
Radek Szagański 83.50	1
Nathan Potter 101.13	5

== May ==
=== Challenge Tour 11 ===
Challenge Tour 11 was contested on 1 May 2026 at the Halle 39 in Hildesheim. The tournament was won by Levy Frauenfelder, who defeated Henry Coates 5–3 in the final.

Quarter-finals (best of 9 legs)
(England) Harrison Leigh 83.71	5
Kevin Troppmann 83.44	3
Daniel Ayres 83.89	2
Henry Coates 95.29	5
Tommy Lishman 103.45	5
James Beeton 100.23	2
Jack Tweddell 84.22	4
Levy Frauenfelder 85.32	5

Semi-finals (best of 9 legs)
(England) Harrison Leigh 82.36	4
Henry Coates 85.19	5
Tommy Lishman 85.52	4
Levy Frauenfelder 87.15	5

Final (best of 9 legs)
Henry Coates 102.90	3
Levy Frauenfelder 93.34	5

=== Challenge Tour 12 ===
Challenge Tour 12 was contested on 1 May 2026 at the Halle 39 in Hildesheim. The tournament was won by Harry Ward, who defeated Tommy Lishman 5–3 in the final.

Quarter-finals (best of 9 legs)
Paul Rowley 87.09	4
Harry Ward 94.60	5
(England) Ashton Brown 85.90	3
Jack Aldridge 98.77	5
Joe Hunt 91.65	2
Tommy Lishman 94.07	5
Steve Hine 82.92	2
(England) Andy Courtney 84.94	5

Semi-finals (best of 9 legs)
Harry Ward 94.51	5
Jack Aldridge 92.73	3
Tommy Lishman 93.94	5
(England) Andy Courtney 86.80	0

Final (best of 9 legs)
Harry Ward 89.80	5
Tommy Lishman 84.69	3

=== Challenge Tour 13 ===
Challenge Tour 13 was contested on 2 May 2026 at the Halle 39 in Hildesheim. The tournament was won by Christopher Wickenden, who defeated David Evans 5–3 in the final.

Quarter-finals (best of 9 legs)
Liam Maendl-Lawrance 84.45	2
Christopher Wickenden 86.90	5
(Netherlands) Stef Kosters 78.25	3
Patrick Tringler 82.54	5
David Evans 83.50	5
Joe Hunt 82.69	0
Gilbert van der Meijden 89.16	5
Marcel Hausotter 93.30	4

Semi-finals (best of 9 legs)
Christopher Wickenden 85.37	5
Patrick Tringler 86.49	4
David Evans 93.93	5
Gilbert van der Meijden 91.10	2

Final (best of 9 legs)
Christopher Wickenden 87.54	5
David Evans 93.49	3

=== Challenge Tour 14 ===
Challenge Tour 14 was contested on 2 May 2026 at the Halle 39 in Hildesheim. The tournament was won by Joe Hunt, who defeated Tommy Morris 5–3 in the final.

Quarter-finals (best of 9 legs)
Nathan Potter 85.07	4
Derek Coulson 84.12	5
Joe Hunt 88.57	5
Jamai van den Herik 83.53	3
Owen Roelofs 86.81	4
Tommy Morris 90.72	5
Michele Turetta 73.13	2
Finn Behrens 78.40	5

Semi-finals (best of 9 legs)
Derek Coulson 95.68	4
Joe Hunt 88.33	5
Tommy Morris 92.31	5
Finn Behrens 88.84	3

Final (best of 9 legs)
Joe Hunt 88.38	5
Tommy Morris 80.52	3

=== Challenge Tour 15 ===
Challenge Tour 15 was contested on 3 May 2026 at the Halle 39 in Hildesheim. The tournament was won by Daniel Ayres, who defeated Kevin Burness 5–3 in the final.

Quarter-finals (best of 9 legs)
Radek Szagański 92.75	3
Daniel Ayres 94.05	5
(Netherlands) Ricardo Ulrich 95.22	5
Pál Székely 91.89	2
Levy Frauenfelder 75.58	3
Jake Eichen 75.87	5
Kevin Burness 91.96	5
Aden Kirk 87.11	4

Semi-finals (best of 9 legs)
Daniel Ayres 97.66	5
(Netherlands) Ricardo Ulrich 88.45	3
Jake Eichen 77.93	3
Kevin Burness 82.16	5

Final (best of 9 legs)
Daniel Ayres 93.58	5
Kevin Burness 91.64	3

== August ==
=== Challenge Tour 16 ===
Challenge Tour 16 was contested on 14 August 2026 at the Arena MK in Milton Keynes. The tournament was won by Derek Coulson, who defeated Stef Kosters 5–4 in the final.

Quarter-finals (best of 9 legs)
Derek Coulson 98.39	5
Kevin Burness 92.86	4
Brian Raman 79.03	2
Archie Self 86.75	5
Michele Turetta 91.19	0
David Davies 92.78	5
James Beeton 86.91	3
Stef Kosters 87.89	5

Semi-finals (best of 9 legs)
Derek Coulson 88.41	5
Archie Self 80.50	0
David Davies 79.11	4
Stef Kosters 80.64	5

Final (best of 9 legs)
Derek Coulson 90.63	5
Stef Kosters 80.63	4

=== Challenge Tour 17 ===
Challenge Tour 17 was contested on 14 August 2026 at the Arena MK in Milton Keynes. The tournament was won by David Davies, who defeated Dan Hands 5–1 in the final.

Quarter-finals (best of 9 legs)
Joseph Heywood 95.09	3
David Davies 96.26	5
Patrik Williams 101.55	5
John Henderson 83.58	0
Lewis Pride 94.03	5
Daniel Klose 96.38	3
(Belgium) Jenson Remory 89.26	3
Dan Hands 97.60	5

Semi-finals (best of 9 legs)
David Davies 89.57	5
Patrik Williams 87.40	2
Lewis Pride 83.59	1
Dan Hands 91.71	5

Final (best of 9 legs)
David Davies 102.90	5
Dan Hands 89.61	1

=== Challenge Tour 18 ===
Challenge Tour 18 was contested on 15 August 2026 at the Arena MK in Milton Keynes. The tournament was won by Archie Self, who defeated Daniel Klose 5–4 in the final.

Quarter-finals (best of 9 legs)
Henry Coates 95.35	3
Daniel Klose 100.79	5
Steve Lennon 93.95	5
Nunjo Dewaele 92.36	4
Alan Norris 83.13	5
Michael Unterbuchner 91.88	3
Archie Self 101.55	5
John Henderson 96.45	1

Semi-finals (best of 9 legs)
Daniel Klose 103.05	5
Steve Lennon 107.79	3
Alan Norris 85.24	2
Archie Self 91.94	5

Final (best of 9 legs)
Daniel Klose 89.61	4
Archie Self 94.29	5

=== Challenge Tour 19 ===
Challenge Tour 19 was contested on 15 August 2026 at the Arena MK in Milton Keynes. The tournament was won by Dylan Slevin, who defeated Tommy Morris 5–1 in the final.

Quarter-finals (best of 9 legs)
Henry Coates 97.38	5
Joseph Heywood 88.79	3
Tommy Morris 90.42	4
Jack Main 82.38	2
Gilbert van der Meijden 86.78	2
Dylan Slevin 90.33	5
Steve Beaton 87.89	5
(England) Robbie Martin 84.89	3

Semi-finals (best of 9 legs)
Henry Coates 85.57	3
Tommy Morris 85.04	5
Dylan Slevin 93.94	5
Steve Beaton 81.84	0

Final (best of 9 legs)
Tommy Morris 86.12	1
Dylan Slevin 97.78	5

=== Challenge Tour 20 ===
Challenge Tour 20 was contested on 16 August 2026 at the Arena MK in Milton Keynes. The tournament was won by Daniel Klose, who defeated Derek Coulson 5–1 in the final.

Quarter-finals (best of 9 legs)
Geoffrey Murray 85.63	5
Patrik Williams 90.73	3
(England) James Howard Hughes 85.85	1
Derek Coulson 110.44	5
(Netherlands) Ricardo Ulrich 92.79	3
Daniel Klose 95.33	5
(Belgium) Michael De Meyer 87.10	3
Scott Waites 88.70	5

Semi-finals (best of 9 legs)
Geoffrey Murray 79.68	3
Derek Coulson 84.13	5
Daniel Klose 94.45	5
Scott Waites 89.46	4

Final (best of 9 legs)
Derek Coulson 93.78	1
Daniel Klose 96.07	5

== September ==
=== Challenge Tour 21 ===
Challenge Tour 21 was contested on 26 September 2026 at the Robin Park in Wigan. The tournament was won by Archie Self, who defeated Tommy Morris 5–1 in the final.

Quarter-finals (best of 9 legs)
Jack Aldridge 91.26	4
Archie Self 90.08	5
Daniel Klose 90.55	5
Ashley Coleman 93.86	3
Martijn Dragt 96.76	4
Joe Hunt 100.53	5
Geoffrey Murray 77.79	3
Tommy Morris 84.92	5

Semi-finals (best of 9 legs)
Archie Self 85.72	5
Daniel Klose 79.80	2
Joe Hunt 101.51	3
Tommy Morris 104.26	5

Final (best of 9 legs)
Archie Self 104.49	5
Tommy Morris 98.13	1

=== Challenge Tour 22 ===
Challenge Tour 22 was contested on 26 September 2026 at the Robin Park in Wigan. The tournament was won by Joe Hunt, who defeated Callum Francis 5–3 in the final.

Quarter-finals (best of 9 legs)
Steve Lennon 88.47	4
Callum Francis 85.51	5
Scott Campbell 86.69	5
Kevin McDine 88.25	3
Harry Ward 89.03	5
(England) Ashton Brown 82.90	2
Joe Hunt 89.14	5
Ted Evetts 83.13	3

Semi-finals (best of 9 legs)
Callum Francis 87.16	5
Scott Campbell 87.56	2
Harry Ward 79.89	4
Joe Hunt 85.54	5

Final (best of 9 legs)
Callum Francis 94.37	3
Joe Hunt 93.68	5

=== Challenge Tour 23 ===
Challenge Tour 23 was contested on 27 September 2026 at the Robin Park in Wigan. The tournament was won by Joe Hunt, who defeated Jack Tweddell 5–1 in the final.

Quarter-finals (best of 9 legs)
Kevin Burness 88.51	4
(England) Harrison Leigh 88.12	5
Jack Aldridge 83.46	4
Joe Hunt 100.87	5
Jack Tweddell 87.13	5
Adam Hunt 82.92	2
Tommy Morris 98.30	5
Steve Lennon 92.41	3

Semi-finals (best of 9 legs)
(England) Harrison Leigh 88.66	3
Joe Hunt 98.61	5
Jack Tweddell 95.67	5
Tommy Morris 95.50	4

Final (best of 9 legs)
Joe Hunt 99.48	5
Jack Tweddell 93.32	1

=== Challenge Tour 24 ===
Challenge Tour 24 was contested on 27 September 2026 at the Robin Park in Wigan. The tournament was won by Patrik Williams, who defeated Jack Aldridge 5–3 in the final.

Quarter-finals (best of 9 legs)
Jack Aldridge 87.61	5
Martin Thomas 89.53	4
(England) Jonathan Kavanagh 83.36	4
Jamie Kay 79.61	5
Patrik Williams 90.55	5
(Belgium) Jenson Remory 79.92	3
Aden Kirk 90.88	3
Sam Jackson 95.72	5

Semi-finals (best of 9 legs)
Jack Aldridge 82.69	5
Jamie Kay 80.83	1
Patrik Williams 93.26	5
Sam Jackson 88.49	4

Final (best of 9 legs)
Jack Aldridge 78.89	3
Patrik Williams 94.78	5
