= 2026 PDC Pro Tour =

Darts tournament series

The 2026 PDC Pro Tour is a series of non-televised darts tournaments organised by the Professional Darts Corporation (PDC). Players Championships and European Tours are the events that make up the Pro Tour. The 2026 calendar consists of 34 Players Championship events, 15 European Tour events, as well as 24 events for each of the PDC's secondary tours—the Challenge Tour, Development Tour and Women's Series.

== Prize money ==
On 31 March 2025, the PDC announced a mass increase in prize money for PDC Pro Tour tournaments, along with increases for the PDC's secondary tours. The breakdown for each tour is shown below:

Stage	ET	PC	CT/DT	WS
Winner	£35,000	£15,000	£3,000	£2,500
Runner-up	£15,000	£10,000	£2,000	£1,000
Semi-finalists	£10,000	£6,500	£1,000	£750
Quarter-finalists	£8,000	£4,000	£750	£500
Last 16	£5,000	£3,000	£350	£300
Last 32	£3,500 (Note: Pre-qualified players from the PDC and PDC Pro Tour Orders of Merit who lose in their first match of the event shall not be credited with prize money on any Order of Merit. A player who qualifies as a qualifier, but later becomes a seed due to the withdrawal of one or more other players shall be credited with their prize money on all Orders of Merit regardless of how far they progress in the event.)	£2,000	£250	£200
Last 48	£2,000	N/A	N/A	N/A
Last 64	N/A	£1,250	£100	£75 (Note: Last 64 prize money is only paid out if a minimum of 128 participants take part in a Women's Series event.)
Total	£230,000	£150,000	£20,000	£15,000

== PDC Tour Card ==
128 players are granted PDC Tour Cards, which enables them to participate in all Players Championship events, the UK Open, and qualifiers for all European Tours and select televised events.

=== Tour Cards ===
The 2026 PDC Tour Cards were awarded to:

- (64) The top 64 players from the PDC Order of Merit after the 2026 World Championship
- (28) Qualifiers from 2025 Q-School not ranked in the top 64 of the PDC Order of Merit following the World Championship
- (2) Two highest qualifiers from the 2024 Challenge Tour (Wesley Plaisier and Christian Kist)
- (1) The highest qualifier from the 2024 Development Tour (Sebastian Białecki)
  - Niko Springer, who also earned a Tour Card through the 2024 Development Tour, entered the top 64 in his first year on tour. Therefore, one extra Tour Card was awarded at 2026 Q-School.
- (2) Two highest qualifiers from the 2025 Challenge Tour (Stefan Bellmont and Darius Labanauskas)
- (2) Two highest qualifiers from the 2025 Development Tour (Beau Greaves and Owen Bates)
- (16) The daily finalists from the 2026 Q-Schools.

Afterwards, the playing field was complemented by the highest qualified players from the Q-School Orders of Merit until the maximum number of 128 Tour Card players had been reached.

=== Q-School ===
PDC Qualifying School (or Q-School) is split into two different events: UK Q-School for British and Irish players, held at the Arena MK in Milton Keynes, England; and European Q-School for the rest of Europe, held at Wunderland Kalkar in Kalkar, Germany. Non-European players can choose which Q-School to compete in.

There are two stages in Q-School:

- The First Stage, played between 5–7 January, was entered by any darts player who registered to compete. The players who reached the last 16 of each of the three days qualified for the Final Stage alongside other players coming from a First Stage Order of Merit ranking, producing a full list of 128 players for each Final Stage.
- The Final Stage, held between 8–11 January, consisted of all players qualified from the First Stage plus the players exempted to the Final Stage; players who were exempted were those who lost their PDC Tour Cards after the 2026 World Championship, and those who finished from third to sixteenth in the 2025 Challenge Tour and Development Tour Orders of Merit who did not have PDC Tour Cards yet. In a change from prior years, players from lower in the First Stage Order of Merit came in after the first day to replace Tour Card winners, with the intent of consistently having a 128-player field at both Q-Schools.

The final two players of each day's play in the Final Stage were given a PDC Tour Card. The remaining Tour Cards were then awarded to players in qualifying positions on the respective UK and European Q-School Orders of Merit. A total of 29 PDC Tour Cards were distributed—13 at UK Q-School and 16 at European Q-School.

8 January	9 January	10 January	11 January
UK Q-School
Rhys Griffin (WAL); Adam Leek (AUS)	Carl Sneyd (ENG); Niall Culleton (IRL)	Shane McGuirk (IRL); Tom Sykes (ENG)	Charlie Manby (ENG); Samuel Price (ENG)
European Q-School
Arno Merk (GER); Filip Bereza (POL)	Jeffrey Sparidaans (NED); Cristo Reyes (ESP)	Matthias Ehlers (GER); Yorick Hofkens (GER)	Sietse Lap (NED); Jeffrey de Zwaan (NED)

At the end of the fourth day in the Final Stage, the following players earned Tour Cards through the Orders of Merit:

UK Q-School Order of Merit

1. Stephen Burton (ENG)
2. Mervyn King (ENG)
3. Tyler Thorpe (ENG)
4. Stephen Rosney (IRL)
5. David Sharp (SCO)

European Q-School Order of Merit

1. Jimmy van Schie (NED)
2. Chris Landman (NED)
3. Marvin Kraft (GER)
4. Benjamin Pratnemer (SVN)
5. Adam Gawlas (CZE)
6. Jurjen van der Velde (NED)
7. Alexander Merkx (NED)
8. Pascal Rupprecht (GER)

== Players Championships ==
The PDC Players Championships (PC) are a series of non-televised darts events that are part of the PDC Pro Tour. The number of events was the same as the previous year, with a total of 34 Players Championship events.

The Players Championship Order of Merit is determined based on the total prize money won by each player in the Players Championship events throughout the year. The top 64 players on this ranking will qualify for the Players Championship Finals.

2026 PDC Players Championship season
No.	Date	Venue	Winner	Legs	Runner-up	Ref.
1	Monday 9 February	Halle 39, Hildesheim, Germany	James Wade (93.69)	8 – 6	Nathan Aspinall (95.26)	
2	Tuesday 10 February	Halle 39, Hildesheim, Germany	Wessel Nijman (102.78)	8 – 7	Gerwyn Price (107.41)	
3	Monday 16 February	Robin Park Leisure Centre, Wigan, England	Chris Dobey (95.37)	8 – 1	Stephen Bunting (84.92)	
4	Tuesday 17 February	Robin Park Leisure Centre, Wigan, England	Luke Humphries (104.62)	8 – 6	Wessel Nijman (92.87)	
5	Tuesday 24 February	Leicester Arena, England	Ross Smith (104.24)	8 – 2	Chris Dobey (97.86)	
6	Wednesday 25 February	Leicester Arena, England	Gerwyn Price (95.59)	8 – 1	Andrew Gilding (94.67)	
7	Monday 30 March	Leicester Arena, England	Ryan Searle (95.65)	8 – 3	Alan Soutar (99.00)	
8	Tuesday 31 March	Leicester Arena, England	Wessel Nijman (97.70)	8 – 4	Joe Cullen (98.98)	
9	Monday 13 April	Robin Park Leisure Centre, Wigan, England	Chris Dobey (105.28)	8 – 4	Justin Hood (102.91)	
10	Tuesday 14 April	Robin Park Leisure Centre, Wigan, England	Wessel Nijman (101.34)	8 – 2	Scott Waites (83.98)	
11	Monday 27 April	Arena MK, Milton Keynes, England	Beau Greaves (96.49)	8 – 7	Michael Smith (97.74)	
12	Tuesday 28 April	Arena MK, Milton Keynes, England	Wessel Nijman (96.84)	8 – 5	Jermaine Wattimena (94.12)	
13	Monday 4 May	Halle 39, Hildesheim, Germany	Kevin Doets (100.61)	8 – 5	Luke Woodhouse (94.26)	
14	Tuesday 5 May	Halle 39, Hildesheim, Germany	Wessel Nijman (104.62)	8 – 1	Max Hopp (98.08)	
15	Tuesday 12 May	Leicester Arena, England	Michael van Gerwen (106.57)	8 – 5	Dirk van Duijvenbode (101.86)	
16	Wednesday 13 May	Leicester Arena, England	Andrew Gilding (99.78)	8 – 3	Jonny Clayton (95.24)	
17	Monday 18 May	Leicester Arena, England	Luke Humphries (104.89)	8 – 4	Jermaine Wattimena (97.16)	
18	Tuesday 19 May	Leicester Arena, England	Luke Woodhouse (102.04)	8 – 4	Andrew Gilding (96.96)	
19	Tuesday 2 June	Arena MK, Milton Keynes, England	Jeffrey de Graaf (101.11)	8 – 5	Jonny Clayton (100.69)	
20	Wednesday 3 June	Arena MK, Milton Keynes, England	Ross Smith (107.01)	8 – 5	William O'Connor (93.49)	
21	Tuesday 16 June	Robin Park Leisure Centre, Wigan, England	Wessel Nijman (96.56)	8 – 6	Ryan Searle (95.90)	
22	Wednesday 17 June	Robin Park Leisure Centre, Wigan, England	Rob Cross (97.83)	8 – 5	Maik Kuivenhoven (82.53)	
23	Monday 6 July	Leicester Arena, England	Cameron Menzies (95.54)	8 – 5	Cristo Reyes (94.78)	
24	Tuesday 7 July	Leicester Arena, England	Gabriel Clemens (94.53)	8 – 6	Luke Woodhouse (96.00)	
25	Tuesday 28 July	Halle 39, Hildesheim, Germany	Henry Coates (104.88)	8 – 4	Damon Heta (106.11)	
26	Wednesday 29 July	Halle 39, Hildesheim, Germany	Sebastian Białecki (93.80)	8 – 6	Mario Vandenbogaerde (85.91)	
27	Tuesday 25 August	Leicester Arena, England	Jermaine Wattimena (93.81)	8 – 6	Kevin Doets (93.22)	
28	Wednesday 26 August	Leicester Arena, England	Luke Humphries (93.88)	8 – 6	Brendan Dolan (87.31)	
29	Tuesday 22 September	Maaspoort, Den Bosch, Netherlands	Cameron Menzies (96.77)	8 – 4	Gian van Veen (89.16)	
30	Wednesday 23 September	Maaspoort, Den Bosch, Netherlands	Karel Sedláček (91.92)	8 – 7	Scott Williams (96.25)	
31	Wednesday 28 October	Maaspoort, Den Bosch, Netherlands	Charlie Manby (99.72)	8 – 2	Maik Kuivenhoven (84.76)	
32	Thursday 29 October	Maaspoort, Den Bosch, Netherlands	Chris Dobey (103.01)	8 – 4	Tommy Morris (94.07)	
33	Wednesday 4 November	Leicester Arena, England	Luke Humphries (103.77)	8 – 4	Niels Zonneveld (92.50)	
34	Thursday 5 November	Leicester Arena, England	Tommy Morris (95.76)	8 – 5	Luke Humphries (92.43)	

== European Tour ==
The PDC European Tour (ET) is a series of darts events that are part of the PDC Pro Tour. In 2026, the total number of events expanded to fifteen, one more than the previous year. European Tour events in Poland and Slovakia will be held for the first time.

The PDC European Tour Order of Merit is determined based on the total prize money won by each player in the European Tour events throughout the year. The top 32 players on this ranking will qualify for the European Championship.

2026 PDC European Tour season
No.	Date	Event	Location	Winner	Legs	Runner-up	Ref.
1	20–22 February	2026 Poland Darts Open	(Poland) EXPO Kraków	Luke Littler (108.06)	8 – 4	Gian van Veen (96.11)	
2	13–15 March	2026 European Darts Trophy	(Germany) Lokhalle, Göttingen	Wessel Nijman (100.80)	8 – 3	Gerwyn Price (92.38)	
3	20–22 March	2026 Belgian Darts Open	(Belgium) Oktoberhallen, Wieze	Luke Humphries (97.37)	8 – 6	Jonny Clayton (94.16)	
4	4–6 April	2026 German Darts Grand Prix	(Germany) Zenith, Munich	Nathan Aspinall (100.35)	8 – 5	Danny Noppert (93.16)	
5	17–19 April	2026 European Darts Grand Prix	(Germany) Glaspalast Sindelfingen	Gerwyn Price (95.70)	8 – 6	Ross Smith (96.25)	
6	8–10 May	2026 Austrian Darts Open	(Austria) Stadthalle Graz	Josh Rock (101.56)	8 – 6	Kevin Doets (101.20)	
7	22–24 May	2026 International Darts Open	(Germany) WT Energiesysteme Arena, Riesa	Ross Smith (90.81)	8 – 3	Ryan Searle (90.11)	
8	29–31 May	2026 Baltic Sea Darts Open	(Germany) Merkur Ostseehalle, Kiel	Luke Woodhouse (98.61)	8 – 4	Ryan Joyce (94.46)	
9	19–21 June	2026 Slovak Darts Open	(Slovakia) Incheba, Bratislava	Wessel Nijman (103.80)	8 – 3	Rob Cross (102.57)	
10	10–12 July	2026 European Darts Open	(Germany) Ostermann-Arena, Leverkusen	Krzysztof Ratajski (92.43)	8 – 6	Jermaine Wattimena (86.73)	
11	28–30 August	2026 Hungarian Darts Trophy	(Hungary) MVM Dome, Budapest	Ross Smith (101.01)	8 – 2	Gary Anderson (90.50)	
12	4–6 September	2026 Czech Darts Open	(Czech Republic) PVA EXPO, Prague	Luke Littler (95.25)	8 – 6	Luke Humphries (94.81)	
13	11–13 September	2026 Flanders Darts Trophy	(Belgium) Antwerp Expo	James Wade (95.50)	8 – 4	Ross Smith (94.82)	
14	9–11 October	2026 Swiss Darts Trophy	(Switzerland) St. Jakobshalle, Basel	Jonny Clayton (101.68)	8 – 4	Luke Humphries (101.75)	
15	16–18 October	2026 Dutch Darts Championship	(Netherlands) MECC Maastricht	Niels Zonneveld (92.93)	8 – 5	Danny Noppert (87.66)	

== PDC secondary tours ==
=== Challenge Tour ===
2026 PDC Challenge Tour season
No.	Date	Venue	Winner	Legs	Runner-up	Ref.
1	Friday 16 January	Arena MK, Milton Keynes, England	Tommy Lishman (99.12)	5 – 2	Tommy Morris (98.52)	
2	Friday 16 January	Arena MK, Milton Keynes, England	Joe Hunt (99.49)	5 – 2	José Justicia (90.20)	
3	Saturday 17 January	Arena MK, Milton Keynes, England	Joe Hunt (88.04)	5 – 2	Arron Monk (80.40)	
4	Saturday 17 January	Arena MK, Milton Keynes, England	Martijn Dragt (88.23)	5 – 3	Scott Waites (88.38)	
5	Sunday 18 January	Arena MK, Milton Keynes, England	Jack Tweddell (85.68)	5 – 1	Steve Lennon (84.06)	
6	Friday 27 March	Leicester Arena, England	Derek Coulson (93.94)	5 – 0	Oliver Mitchell (77.88)	
7	Friday 27 March	Leicester Arena, England	Daniel Klose (87.88)	5 – 3	Callum Goffin (80.89)	
8	Saturday 28 March	Leicester Arena, England	Ted Evetts (86.61)	5 – 4	Aden Kirk (84.98)	
9	Saturday 28 March	Leicester Arena, England	Florian Preis (86.71)	5 – 4	Aden Kirk (87.85)	
10	Sunday 29 March	Leicester Arena, England	Nathan Potter (101.13)	5 – 1	Radek Szagański (83.50)	
11	Friday 1 May	Halle 39, Hildesheim, Germany	Levy Frauenfelder (93.34)	5 – 3	Henry Coates (102.90)	
12	Friday 1 May	Halle 39, Hildesheim, Germany	Harry Ward (89.80)	5 – 3	Tommy Lishman (84.69)	
13	Saturday 2 May	Halle 39, Hildesheim, Germany	Christopher Wickenden (87.54)	5 – 3	David Evans (93.49)	
14	Saturday 2 May	Halle 39, Hildesheim, Germany	Joe Hunt (88.38)	5 – 3	Tommy Morris (80.52)	
15	Sunday 3 May	Halle 39, Hildesheim, Germany	Daniel Ayres (93.58)	5 – 3	Kevin Burness (91.64)	
16	Friday 14 August	Arena MK, Milton Keynes, England	Derek Coulson (90.62)	5 – 4	(Netherlands) Stef Kosters (80.63)	
17	Friday 14 August	Arena MK, Milton Keynes, England	David Davies (102.90)	5 – 1	Dan Hands (89.61)	
18	Saturday 15 August	Arena MK, Milton Keynes, England	Archie Self (94.29)	5 – 4	Daniel Klose (89.61)	
19	Saturday 15 August	Arena MK, Milton Keynes, England	Dylan Slevin (97.78)	5 – 1	Tommy Morris (86.12)	
20	Sunday 16 August	Arena MK, Milton Keynes, England	Daniel Klose (96.07)	5 – 1	Derek Coulson (93.78)	
21	Saturday 26 September	Robin Park Leisure Centre, Wigan, England	Archie Self (104.49)	5 – 1	Tommy Morris (98.13)	
22	Saturday 26 September	Robin Park Leisure Centre, Wigan, England	Joe Hunt (93.68)	5 – 3	Callum Francis (94.37)	
23	Sunday 27 September	Robin Park Leisure Centre, Wigan, England	Joe Hunt (99.48)	5 – 1	Jack Tweddell (93.32)	
24	Sunday 27 September	Robin Park Leisure Centre, Wigan, England	Patrik Williams (94.78)	5 – 3	Jack Aldridge (78.89)	

=== Development Tour ===
2026 PDC Development Tour season
No.	Date	Venue	Winner	Legs	Runner-up	Ref.
1	Friday 20 February	Leicester Arena, England	Jurjen van der Velde (95.35)	5 – 1	Dylan Slevin (86.10)	
2	Friday 20 February	Leicester Arena, England	Sebastian Białecki (90.41)	5 – 3	James Beeton (84.51)	
3	Saturday 21 February	Leicester Arena, England	Jurjen van der Velde (97.54)	5 – 3	Charlie Manby (94.96)	
4	Saturday 21 February	Leicester Arena, England	Jack Drayton (86.31)	5 – 1	Angelo Balsamo (75.39)	
5	Sunday 22 February	Leicester Arena, England	Jack Drayton (90.67)	5 – 3	Cam Crabtree (89.35)	
6	Friday 24 April	Arena MK, Milton Keynes, England	James Beeton (89.05)	5 – 4	Nathan Potter (86.53)	
7	Friday 24 April	Arena MK, Milton Keynes, England	Leon Weber (97.18)	5 – 2	Dominik Grüllich (93.03)	
8	Saturday 25 April	Arena MK, Milton Keynes, England	Sebastian Białecki (92.75)	5 – 2	Jack Drayton (91.17)	
9	Saturday 25 April	Arena MK, Milton Keynes, England	Leon Weber (88.16)	5 – 2	(England) Ben Townley (85.20)	
10	Sunday 26 April	Arena MK, Milton Keynes, England	Sebastian Białecki (90.46)	5 – 4	Dominik Grüllich (85.19)	
11	Friday 5 June	Arena MK, Milton Keynes, England	Sebastian Białecki (99.53)	5 – 1	David Fidler (88.24)	
12	Friday 5 June	Arena MK, Milton Keynes, England	Sebastian Białecki (91.17)	5 – 1	Cam Crabtree (85.13)	
13	Saturday 6 June	Arena MK, Milton Keynes, England	Sebastian Białecki (88.61)	5 – 2	Leon Weber (77.56)	
14	Saturday 6 June	Arena MK, Milton Keynes, England	Cam Crabtree (91.87)	5 – 4	Nathan Potter (87.72)	
15	Sunday 7 June	Arena MK, Milton Keynes, England	Adam Gawlas (92.43)	5 – 3	Sebastian Białecki (83.71)	
16	Friday 31 July	Halle 39, Hildesheim, Germany	Owen Bates (97.60)	5 – 0	Kaya Baysal (85.72)	
17	Friday 31 July	Halle 39, Hildesheim, Germany	Sam Jackson (93.99)	5 – 3	Jan Schmidt (87.82)	
18	Saturday 1 August	Halle 39, Hildesheim, Germany	Jamai van den Herik (92.63)	5 – 3	Angelo Balsamo (81.26)	
19	Saturday 1 August	Halle 39, Hildesheim, Germany	Yorick Hofkens (85.80)	5 – 3	Adam Gawlas (86.36)	
20	Sunday 2 August	Halle 39, Hildesheim, Germany	Lenny Schlüter (81.00)	5 – 4	Henry Coates (87.86)	
21	Saturday 3 October	Robin Park Leisure Centre, Wigan, England	Nunjo Dewaele (83.31)	5 – 4	Cole Davey (86.38)	
22	Saturday 3 October	Robin Park Leisure Centre, Wigan, England	Archie Self (91.64)	5 – 2	Sam Jackson (95.57)	
23	Sunday 4 October	Robin Park Leisure Centre, Wigan, England	Henry Coates (97.41)	5 – 1	Owen Bates (89.55)	
24	Sunday 4 October	Robin Park Leisure Centre, Wigan, England	Kaya Baysal (86.15)	5 – 3	Jurjen van der Velde (80.01)	

=== Women's Series ===
2026 PDC Women's Series season
No.	Date	Venue	Winner	Legs	Runner-up	Ref.
1	Saturday 7 February	Halle 39, Hildesheim, Germany	Beau Greaves (98.43)	5 – 2	Lisa Ashton (92.61)	
2	Saturday 7 February	Halle 39, Hildesheim, Germany	Beau Greaves (89.46)	5 – 0	Lisa Ashton (75.48)	
3	Sunday 8 February	Halle 39, Hildesheim, Germany	Beau Greaves (86.39)	5 – 1	Fallon Sherrock (76.08)	
4	Sunday 8 February	Halle 39, Hildesheim, Germany	Beau Greaves (100.20)	5 – 0	Lisa Ashton (75.92)	
5	Saturday 21 March	Robin Park Leisure Centre, Wigan, England	Lisa Ashton (90.32)	5 – 3	Fallon Sherrock (88.46)	
6	Saturday 21 March	Robin Park Leisure Centre, Wigan, England	Beau Greaves (101.55)	5 – 0	Gemma Hayter (80.21)	
7	Sunday 22 March	Robin Park Leisure Centre, Wigan, England	Beau Greaves (99.16)	5 – 4	Fallon Sherrock (95.98)	
8	Sunday 22 March	Robin Park Leisure Centre, Wigan, England	Beau Greaves (92.60)	5 – 1	Rhian O'Sullivan (80.87)	
9	Saturday 16 May	Leicester Arena, England	Beau Greaves (88.35)	5 – 1	Trina Gulliver (77.97)	
10	Saturday 16 May	Leicester Arena, England	Beau Greaves (93.57)	5 – 1	Karolina Ratajska (79.08)	
11	Sunday 17 May	Leicester Arena, England	Deta Hedman (89.21)	5 – 3	Kirsi Viinikainen (76.32)	
12	Sunday 17 May	Leicester Arena, England	Vicky Pruim (72.48)	5 – 2	Gemma Hayter (65.35)	
13	Saturday 20 June	Robin Park Leisure Centre, Wigan, England	Beau Greaves (88.41)	5 – 0	Vicky Pruim (75.07)	
14	Saturday 20 June	Robin Park Leisure Centre, Wigan, England	Beau Greaves (82.05)	5 – 1	Karolina Ratajska (70.17)	
15	Sunday 21 June	Robin Park Leisure Centre, Wigan, England	Lisa Ashton (82.04)	5 – 1	Beau Greaves (79.25)	
16	Sunday 21 June	Robin Park Leisure Centre, Wigan, England	Eleanor Cairns (79.67)	5 – 4	Angela Kirkwood (76.38)	
17	Saturday 22 August	Leicester Arena, England	Lisa Ashton (67.70)	5 – 0	Lauryn Salter (62.86)	
18	Saturday 22 August	Leicester Arena, England	Fallon Sherrock (81.68)	5 – 0	Lisa Ashton (61.38)	
19	Sunday 23 August	Leicester Arena, England	Beau Greaves (84.55)	5 – 3	Lisa Ashton (81.28)	
20	Sunday 23 August	Leicester Arena, England	Beau Greaves (91.65)	5 – 0	Aileen de Graaf (60.81)	
21	Saturday 10 October	Robin Park Leisure Centre, Wigan, England	Beau Greaves (84.50)	5 – 3	Vicky Pruim (78.34)	
22	Saturday 10 October	Robin Park Leisure Centre, Wigan, England	Beau Greaves (92.44)	5 – 3	Gemma Hayter (90.51)	
23	Sunday 11 October	Robin Park Leisure Centre, Wigan, England	Beau Greaves (101.59)	5 – 3	Jade Gofford (79.14)	
24	Sunday 11 October	Robin Park Leisure Centre, Wigan, England	Beau Greaves (79.28)	5 – 2	Aurora Fochesato (70.97)	
