= 2026 Hungarian Darts Trophy =

Tournament information
- Dates: 28–30 August 2026
- Venue: MVM Dome
- Location: Budapest, Hungary
- Organisation(s): Professional Darts Corporation (PDC)
- Format: Legs
- Prize fund: £230,000
- Winner's share: £35,000
- High checkout: 170; Rob Cross; Chris Dobey

Champion(s)
- Ross Smith (ENG)

The 2026 Hungarian Darts Trophy was a professional darts tournament that took place at the MVM Dome in Budapest, Hungary, from 28 to 30 August 2026. It was the eleventh of fifteen PDC European Tour events on the 2026 PDC Pro Tour. It featured a field of 48 players and £230,000 in prize money, with £35,000 going to the winner.

Beau Greaves became the first woman to compete on the European Tour, losing 6–5 to Rob Cross in the first round. Niko Springer was the defending champion, having defeated Danny Noppert 8–7 in the 2025 final. However, he lost 6–4 to Ryan Searle in the second round.

Ross Smith won his second European Tour title by defeating Gary Anderson 8–2 in the final.

== Prize money ==
As part of a mass boost in prize money for Professional Darts Corporation (PDC) events in 2026, the prize fund for all 2026 European Tour events rose to £230,000, of which the winner will receive £35,000.

Stage (num. of players)		Prize money
Winner	(1)	£35,000
Runner-up	(1)	£15,000
Semi-finalists	(2)	£10,000
Quarter-finalists	(4)	£8,000
Third round losers	(8)	£5,000
Second round losers	(16)	£3,500*
First round losers	(16)	£2,000*
Total	£230,000	

- Pre-qualified players from the Orders of Merit who lose in their first match of the event shall not be credited with prize money on any Order of Merit.

== Qualification and format ==
The top 16 players on the two-year PDC Order of Merit were seeded and entered the tournament in the second round, while the next 16 highest-ranked players from the one-year PDC Pro Tour Order of Merit automatically qualified for the first round. The seedings were confirmed on 2 July. The remaining 16 places went to players from four qualifying events – 10 from the Tour Card Holder Qualifier (held on 8 July), four from the Host Nation Qualifier (held on 25 July), one from the Nordic & Baltic Associate Member Qualifier (held on 15 May), and one from the East European Associate Member Qualifier (held on 4 July).

Beau Greaves became the first woman to qualify for a European Tour event by claiming one of the ten spots in the Tour Card Holder Qualifier.

Gerwyn Price withdrew and was replaced by Callan Rydz. Luke Woodhouse moved up to become the 16th seed. Fifth seed James Wade withdrew after the draw was made and was replaced by Madars Razma.

Seeded players

1. Luke Humphries (ENG) (second round)
2. Gian van Veen (NED) (quarter-finals)
3. Michael van Gerwen (NED) (third round)
4. Jonny Clayton (WAL) (third round)
5. ~~James Wade (ENG)~~ (withdrew)
6. Josh Rock (NIR) (third round)
7. Stephen Bunting (ENG) (third round)
8. Danny Noppert (NED) (semi-finals)
9. Ryan Searle (ENG) (third round)
10. Gary Anderson (SCO) (runner-up)
11. Chris Dobey (ENG) (quarter-finals)
12. Wessel Nijman (NED) (second round)
13. Ross Smith (ENG) (champion)
14. Nathan Aspinall (ENG) (semi-finals)
15. Jermaine Wattimena (NED) (third round)
16. Luke Woodhouse (ENG) (second round)

PDC Pro Tour Order of Merit qualifiers
- Kevin Doets (NED) (first round)
- Andrew Gilding (ENG) (second round)
- Rob Cross (ENG) (third round)
- Krzysztof Ratajski (POL) (second round)
- Niko Springer (GER) (second round)
- William O'Connor (IRL) (second round)
- Niels Zonneveld (NED) (first round)
- Martin Schindler (GER) (first round)
- Dirk van Duijvenbode (NED) (quarter-finals)
- Ryan Joyce (ENG) (second round)
- Damon Heta (AUS) (first round)
- Joe Cullen (ENG) (second round)
- Daryl Gurney (NIR) (first round)
- Cameron Menzies (SCO) (first round)
- Dave Chisnall (ENG) (quarter-finals)

Tour Card qualifier
- Keane Barry (IRL) (third round)
- Ritchie Edhouse (ENG) (second round)
- Tom Sykes (ENG) (second round)
- Maik Kuivenhoven (NED) (first round)
- Adam Leek (AUS) (first round)
- Beau Greaves (ENG) (first round)
- James Hurrell (ENG) (second round)
- Connor Scutt (ENG) (first round)
- Samuel Price (ENG) (first round)
- Cristo Reyes (ESP) (first round)
Host Nation qualifier
- Nándor Major (HUN) (second round)
- László Kádár (HUN) (second round)
- András Borbély (HUN) (first round)
- Milán Biró (HUN) (first round)
Nordic & Baltic qualifier
- Jonas Masalin (FIN) (second round)
East European qualifier
- David Písek (CZE) (first round)
Reserve list
- Callan Rydz (ENG) (first round)
- Madars Razma (LAT) (second round)

== Summary ==
=== First round ===
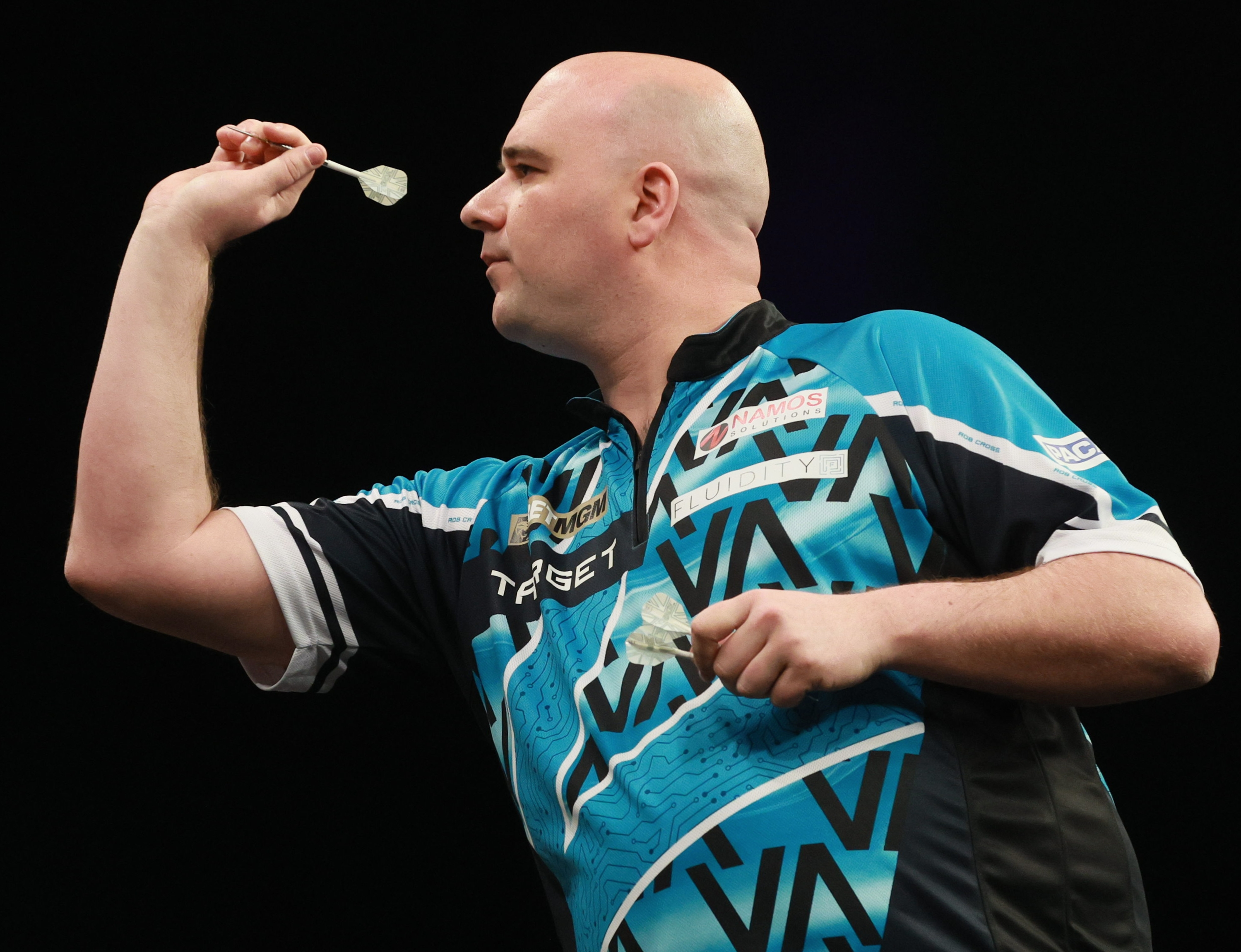
The 2018 world champion Rob Cross (pictured in 2025) won his first-round match 6–5 against Beau Greaves, the first woman to compete on the European Tour.

The first round (best of 11 legs) was played on 28 August. Debutant Beau Greaves became the first woman to compete on the European Tour, being drawn against the 2018 world champion Rob Cross. Cross hit a 170 checkout in the opening leg before the pair went to a deciding leg, where two errant darts from Greaves while attempting a 70 finish allowed Cross to win 6–5. Cross and Greaves ended the match with three-dart averages of 101.90 and 104.88, respectively. "She [Greaves] has been phenomenal on the Pro Tour, and I think when she learns her trade on the big stage, she's going to do more," said Cross about his opponent. Two of the four Hungarian qualifiers advanced to the second round, with debutant László Kádár beating Daryl Gurney and Nándor Major defeating Niels Zonneveld, both by a 6–5 scoreline. Andrew Gilding earned a whitewash win over Hungarian debutant Milán Biró, while Biró's compatriot András Borbély lost 6–3 to 2023 champion Dave Chisnall. The 2022 champion Joe Cullen joined fellow former champion Chisnall in the second round by defeating Adam Leek 6–3.

Defending champion Niko Springer started his title defence with a 6–1 victory over Maik Kuivenhoven. "I had a big smile because I was so happy to be here again, and I cannot wait to play tomorrow," commented Springer afterwards. Finnish qualifier Jonas Masalin capitalised on 31 missed doubles from opponent Kevin Doets to earn a 6–4 upset win. Dirk van Duijvenbode defeated Czech qualifier David Písek 6–1 to set up a second-round meeting with top seed Luke Humphries. Callan Rydz missed two match darts in a 6–5 loss to European Darts Open champion Krzysztof Ratajski, while James Hurrell earned his first win on the European Tour by defeating Damon Heta by the same scoreline. Irish duo Keane Barry and William O'Connor achieved respective 6–2 wins against Martin Schindler and Samuel Price. Tom Sykes averaged 101.20 as he beat Cameron Menzies 6–1. The 2024 European Championship winner Ritchie Edhouse won six straight legs to defeat Connor Scutt 6–1, while Ryan Joyce beat Cristo Reyes 6–3.

=== Second round ===
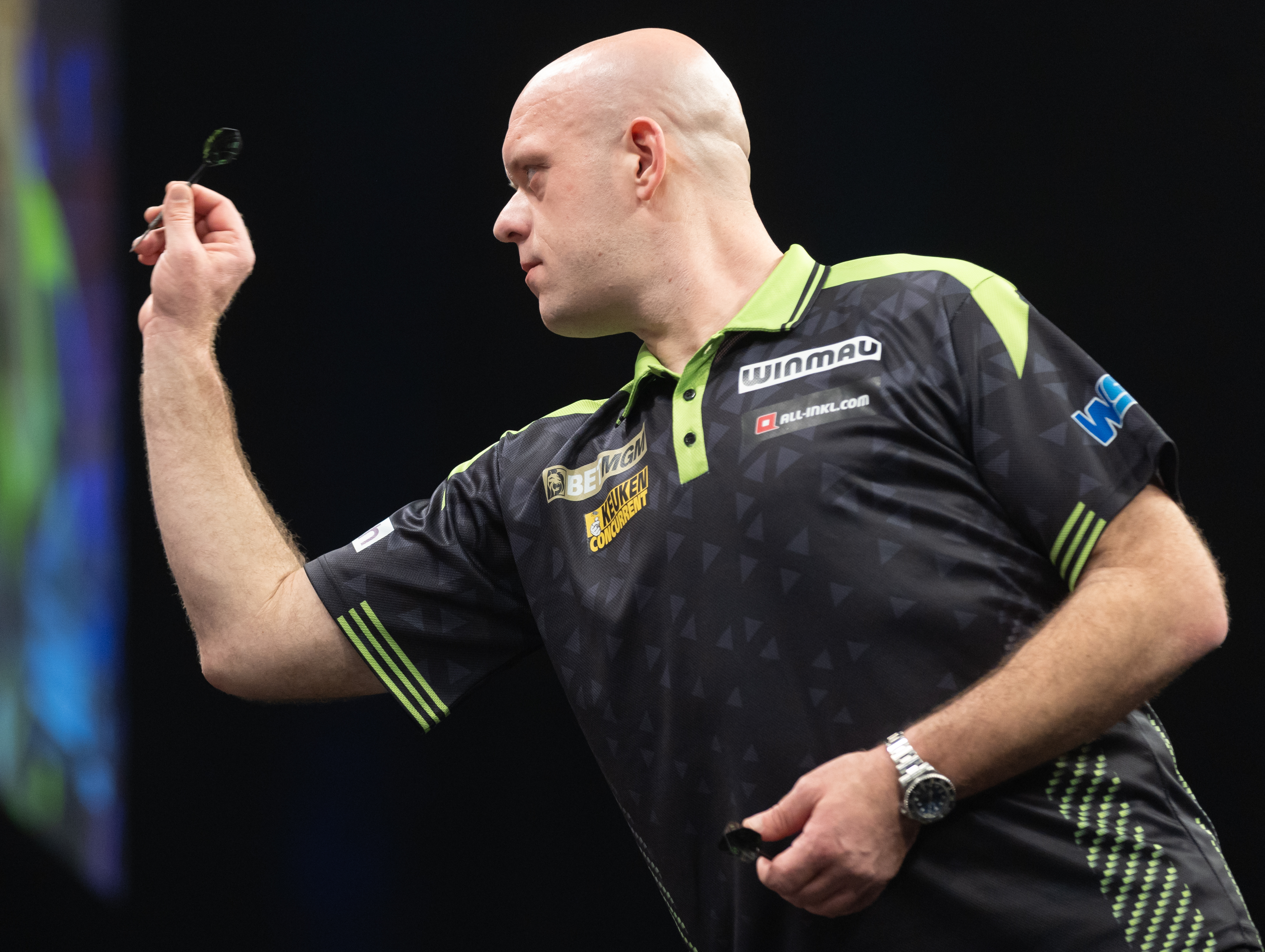
Three-time world champion Michael van Gerwen (pictured in 2026), who won the 2024 edition, came back from 3–1 down to defeat James Hurrell 6–4 in his opening match.

The second round (best of 11 legs) was played on 29 August. Top seed and world number two Luke Humphries, who made his first European Tour appearance since winning the 2026 Belgian Darts Open, was defeated in his opening match by Dirk van Duijvenbode, who landed a 140 checkout on his way to a 6–3 victory. Ending a nine-match losing streak against the former world champion, Van Duijvenbode expressed his happiness with life after "a lot of struggles" and called Humphries a "phenomenal player". The 2024 Hungarian Darts Trophy champion and three-time world champion Michael van Gerwen overturned a 3–1 deficit to beat James Hurrell 6–4. Hungary's László Kádár and Nándor Major both exited the tournament in the second round, losing their respective matches 6–3 to Jonny Clayton and 6–0 to Gian van Veen. Reigning champion Niko Springer was also eliminated, losing 6–4 to Ryan Searle.

Taken to his second last-leg decider of the tournament, Rob Cross converted a 130 checkout to complete a 6–5 win against sixteenth seed Luke Woodhouse, who had missed darts at double to win the match. Two-time world champion Gary Anderson registered his first win on the European Tour in 2026, averaging 105.27 as he beat Krzysztof Ratajski 6–2. Ross Smith and Dave Chisnall were also 6–2 winners, averaging over 100 to defeat William O'Connor and twelfth seed Wessel Nijman, respectively. Chris Dobey came back from 4–0 down to beat Tom Sykes in a deciding leg, while Josh Rock achieved a whitewash victory over Joe Cullen. Reserve player Madars Razma hit a 158 checkout on the bullseye before losing 6–2 to Keane Barry, who reached the last 16 of a European Tour event for the first time since 2023. Nathan Aspinall, Danny Noppert and Jermaine Wattimena earned respective 6–4 wins against Ryan Joyce, Ritchie Edhouse, and Andrew Gilding, while Stephen Bunting defeated Jonas Masalin 6–1.

=== Final day ===
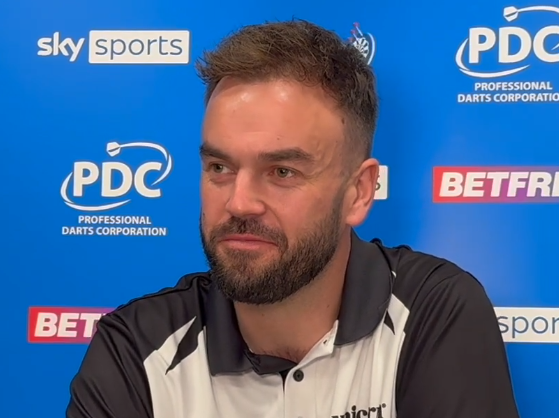
Ross Smith (pictured in 2024) won his second European Tour title of 2026, defeating Gary Anderson 8–2 in the final.

The third round, quarter-finals, semi-finals and final were played on 30 August. The third round and quarter-finals were contested over the best of 11 legs, the semi-finals over the best of 13 legs, and the final over the best of 15 legs. The final day saw Ross Smith and Gary Anderson reach the final. Smith began the day by defeating fourth seed Jonny Clayton 6–4, following that win by beating Dave Chisnall 6–2 and Danny Noppert 7–3. Meanwhile, Gary Anderson contested three consecutive last-leg deciders to reach the final. He secured 6–5 wins against Stephen Bunting and Gian van Veen, before surviving five match darts from Nathan Aspinall to prevail 7–6 in the semi-finals. Chris Dobey also hit a 170 finish to complete a 6–3 win against Josh Rock in the third round. Smith looked to win his second European Tour title in his third final of the year, while Anderson played in his first European Tour final of 2026 in only his third appearance all year.

Smith went 2–1 in front during the early proceedings of the final, landing checkouts of 124 and 103. He extended this lead to 6–1 to take a five-leg advantage. Anderson put a halt to Smith's run in the following leg, but the Englishman claimed the next two to secure an 8–2 win, completing the victory with an 11-dart break of throw. Smith finished the match with a three-dart average of 101.01 and hit 73 per cent of his darts at double.

Smith won his second European Tour title, adding to his first at the International Darts Open earlier in the year. Smith rose to 15th in the PDC World Rankings, having started the tournament as the world number 17, and overtook Wessel Nijman to occupy the top spot in the 2026 European Tour rankings. Smith said that he felt "a bit in disbelief" with the win, which came after two losses on the World Series. Celebrating with his son afterwards, he expressed his love for the European Tour: "To travel the world and see everything and take my little lad with me, it’s an absolute privilege." Speaking in defeat, Anderson believed his run to the final was "sheer luck" and "a gift from the gods", also highlighting Smith's "brilliant" performances throughout the day.

== Draw ==
The draw was announced on 27 August. Numbers to the left of a player's name show the seedings for the top 16 in the tournament. The figures to the right of a player's name state their three-dart average in a match. The two reserve players are indicated by 'Alt'. Players in bold denote match winners.

**First round** (best of 11 legs); 28 August
**Dirk van Duijvenbode 90.71**	**6**
David Pisek 77.24	1
**Rob Cross 101.90**	**6**
Beau Greaves 104.88	5
**Ritchie Edhouse 88.90**	**6**
Connor Scutt 75.89	2
**Niko Springer 95.06**	**6**
Maik Kuivenhoven 91.35	1
Daryl Gurney 91.75	5
**László Kádár 93.90**	**6**
**William O'Connor 97.10**	**6**
Samuel Price 89.45	2
Martin Schindler 95.97	2
**Keane Barry 100.77**	**6**
**Dave Chisnall 89.11**	**6**
András Borbély 80.49	3
Niels Zonneveld 88.87	5
**Nándor Major 88.69**	**6**
**Andrew Gilding 95.94**	**6**
Milán Biró 85.83	0
Kevin Doets 80.24	4
**Jonas Masalin 76.03**	**6**
**Krzysztof Ratajski 92.57**	**6**
Alt	Callan Rydz 94.82	5
Damon Heta 100.67	5
**James Hurrell 99.70**	**6**
**Ryan Joyce 86.87**	**6**
Cristo Reyes 96.11	3
**Joe Cullen 97.55**	**6**
Adam Leek 92.43	3
Cameron Menzies 96.84	1
**Tom Sykes 101.20**	**6**

**Second round** (best of 11 legs); 29 August
1	Luke Humphries 92.67	3
**Dirk van Duijvenbode 98.34**	**6**
16	Luke Woodhouse 100.12	5
**Rob Cross 100.54**	**6**
**8**	**Danny Noppert 94.01**	**6**
Ritchie Edhouse 90.93	4
**9**	**Ryan Searle 97.31**	**6**
Niko Springer 94.23	4
**4**	**Jonny Clayton 92.79**	**6**
László Kádár 85.43	3
**13**	**Ross Smith 101.33**	**6**
William O'Connor 97.41	2
Alt	Madars Razma 88.60	2
**Keane Barry 91.89**	**6**
12	Wessel Nijman 89.43	2
**Dave Chisnall 100.47**	**6**
**2**	**Gian van Veen 98.02**	**6**
Nándor Major 82.14	0
**15**	**Jermaine Wattimena 96.67**	**6**
Andrew Gilding 90.80	4
**7**	**Stephen Bunting 97.86**	**6**
Jonas Masalin 88.88	1
**10**	**Gary Anderson 105.27**	**6**
Krzysztof Ratajski 88.26	2
**3**	**Michael van Gerwen 93.77**	**6**
James Hurrell 91.91	4
**14**	**Nathan Aspinall 94.63**	**6**
Ryan Joyce 95.28	4
**6**	**Josh Rock 85.89**	**6**
Joe Cullen 76.91	0
**11**	**Chris Dobey 93.33**	**6**
Tom Sykes 91.64	5

**Third round** (best of 11 legs); 30 August
**van Duijvenbode 98.94**	**6**
Cross 91.38	4
**8**	**Noppert 93.32**	**6**
9	Searle 97.19	4
4	Clayton 96.85	4
**13**	**Smith 92.83**	**6**
Barry 89.98	2
**Chisnall 94.54**	**6**
**2**	**van Veen 95.56**	**6**
15	Wattimena 94.26	3
7	Bunting 95.01	5
**10**	**Anderson 97.36**	**6**
3	van Gerwen 89.47	4
**14**	**Aspinall 95.42**	**6**
6	Rock 90.14	3
**11**	**Dobey 93.86**	**6**

**Quarter-finals** (best of 11 legs); 30 August
van Duijvenbode 94.85	5
**8**	**Noppert 90.26**	**6**
**13**	**Smith 95.35**	**6**
Chisnall 89.63	2
2	van Veen 99.79	5
**10**	**Anderson 101.45**	**6**
**14**	**Aspinall 100.95**	**6**
11	Dobey 98.04	5

**Semi-finals** (best of 13 legs); 30 August
8	Noppert 87.49	3
**13**	**Smith 93.30**	**7**
**10**	**Anderson 89.05**	**7**
14	Aspinall 96.87	6

**Final** (best of 15 legs); 30 August
**13**	**Smith 101.01**	**8**
10	Anderson 90.50	2
