= 2024 Poland Darts Masters =

2024 Superbet Poland Darts Masters

Tournament information
- Dates: 14–15 June 2024
- Venue: PreZero Arena
- Location: Gliwice
- Country: Poland
- Organisation(s): PDC
- Format: Legs
- Prize fund: £60,000
- Winner's share: £20,000
- High checkout: 164 Stephen Bunting; Luke Littler

Champion(s)
- Luke Littler

The 2024 Superbet Poland Darts Masters was a professional darts tournament that was held at the PreZero Arena in Gliwice, Poland on 14–15 June 2024. It was the second staging of the tournament by the Professional Darts Corporation after the inaugural 2023 edition, and the fifth event in the 2024 World Series of Darts. The tournament featured 16 players (eight top-ranking players and eight regional qualifiers).

Michael van Gerwen was the defending champion after defeating Dimitri Van den Bergh 8–3 in the 2023 final. However, van Gerwen lost 7–2 to Rob Cross in the semi-finals.

Luke Littler won his second World Series title, defeating Rob Cross 8–3.

== Prize money ==
The total prize fund was £60,000.

Position (no. of players)		Prize money (Total: £60,000)
Winner	(1)	£20,000
Runner-up	(1)	£10,000
Semi-finalists	(2)	£5,000
Quarter-finalists	(4)	£2,500
First round	(8)	£1,250

== Qualifiers ==
The PDC announced the eight players who would be their elite representatives at the event on 27 March. However, on 6 May, it was announced that 2024 Masters champion Stephen Bunting would replace Gerwyn Price in the field.

1. Luke Littler (champion)
2. Rob Cross (runner-up)
3. Michael van Gerwen (semi-finals)
4. Luke Humphries (quarter-finals)
5. Michael Smith (semi-finals)
6. Peter Wright (quarter-finals)
7. Nathan Aspinall (first round)
8. Stephen Bunting (quarter-finals)

The five East European PDC Tour Card holders were selected for the event. The remaining three spots were allocated to the winners of qualifiers in Poland and Hungary. The first Polish qualifying tournament took place in March and was won by Sebastian Białecki, who defeated Krzysztof Kciuk in the final. The second qualifier took place at the beginning of May, with the winner of the tournament being Jacek Krupka. The Hungarian qualifier took place on 3 May and was won by György Jehirszki.

Qualification	Player
PDC Tour Card Holders	Krzysztof Ratajski (first round)
PDC Tour Card Holders	Radek Szagański (first round)
PDC Tour Card Holders	Adam Gawlas (first round)
PDC Tour Card Holders	Karel Sedláček (first round)
PDC Tour Card Holders	Boris Krčmar (quarter-finals)
Hungarian Qualifier	György Jehirszki (first round)
Polish Qualifiers	Sebastian Białecki (first round)
Polish Qualifiers	Jacek Krupka (first round)

== Draw ==
The draw was made on 13 June.

First round (best of 11 legs); 14 June
1	Luke Littler 96.97	6
Adam Gawlas 90.41	4
Peter Wright 81.98	6
Jacek Krupka 64.91	0
4	Luke Humphries 91.77	6
György Jehirszki 87.11	1
Michael Smith 95.18	6
Radek Szagański 85.07	4
2	Rob Cross 95.64	6
Sebastian Białecki 91.66	1
Stephen Bunting 99.62	6
Krzysztof Ratajski 97.24	1
3	Michael van Gerwen 95.07	6
Karel Sedláček 88.69	1
Nathan Aspinall 96.17	4
Boris Krčmar 97.79	6

Quarter-finals (best of 11 legs); 15 June
1	Luke Littler 98.21	6
Peter Wright 109.73	3
4	Luke Humphries 95.69	5
Michael Smith 94.92	6
2	Rob Cross 96.96	6
Stephen Bunting 96.99	4
3	Michael van Gerwen 109.98	6
Boris Krčmar 93.77	0

Semi-finals (best of 13 legs); 15 June
1	Luke Littler 101.13	7
Michael Smith 101.53	6
2	Rob Cross 106.68	7
3	Michael van Gerwen 92.08	2

Final (best of 15 legs); 15 June
1	Luke Littler 101.84	8
2	Rob Cross 94.91	3
