= Jacek Krupka =

Polish darts player

Personal information
- Full name: Jacek Krupka
- Nickname: "Jack"
- Born: 26 July 1977 (age 49) Warsaw, Poland
- Home town: Warsaw, Poland

Sport
- Sport: Darts
- Playing since: 2009
- Darts: 24g Target
- Laterality: Right-handed
- Walk-on music: "Billie Jean" by Michael Jackson

Organisation (see split in darts)
- BDO: 2015–2020
- PDC: 2024
- WDF: 2015–

Jacek Krupka (born 26 July 1977) is a Polish entrepreneur and professional darts player who currently plays in World Darts Federation (WDF) and Professional Darts Corporation (PDC) events. He is the first Polish player to end a leg with a nine-dart finish. He qualified for the 2024 Poland Darts Masters.

== Career ==
Krupka is one of the leading players representing the Masovian Voivodeship. He achieved good results at the national level already in 2009, and in the following years he had a chance to advance to the national team in soft-tip international tournaments. In May 2012, Krupka became the first Polish darts player to finish a leg with a nine-dart finish in official national competition. It happened during the national SuperLiga tournament in a match against Marek Pietralczyk. This achievement was recognized a year later when Winmau awarded him a special award for his achievement.

In 2015, he achieved his greatest international success by advancing to the Last 16 stage of the Polish Open. He lost his match against David Wicks by 2–5 in legs. During the Polish Championship in 2016, he finished the singles competition in the semi-finals, winning the bronze medal.

In 2023, he took part in the national Liga Dart Polska tournament. Krupka advanced to the final of this tournament, where he faced Łukasz Wacławski. On the way to the final, he eliminated the leading Polish players Krzysztof Kciuk and Sebastian Biela. In the final match, Krupka lost to Łukasz Wacławski by 6–8 in legs. In the same year, he repeated his feat from 2012, once again end leg with the nine-dart finish.

In May 2024, he won the qualifying tournament for the 2024 Poland Darts Masters. In the final he defeated Witold Lewandowski by 5–1 in legs.
