= 2026 Baltic Sea Darts Open =

Darts tournament

2026 Elten Safety Shoes Baltic Sea Darts Open

Tournament information
- Dates: 29–31 May 2026
- Venue: Merkur Ostseehalle
- Location: Kiel, Germany
- Organisation(s): Professional Darts Corporation (PDC)
- Format: Legs
- Prize fund: £230,000
- Winner's share: £35,000
- High checkout: 170; Lukas Wenig; Cameron Menzies; William O'Connor

Champion(s)
- Luke Woodhouse (ENG)

The 2026 Baltic Sea Darts Open (known for sponsorship reasons as the 2026 Elten Safety Shoes Baltic Sea Darts Open) was a professional darts tournament that took place at the Merkur Ostseehalle in Kiel, Germany, from 29 to 31 May 2026. It was the eighth of fifteen PDC European Tour events on the 2026 PDC Pro Tour. It featured a field of 48 players and £230,000 in prize money, with £35,000 going to the winner.

Gerwyn Price was the reigning champion, having defeated Gary Anderson 8–3 in the 2025 final. However, Price withdrew from the tournament, and therefore did not defend his title.

Luke Woodhouse won his first European Tour title—twelve days after winning his first PDC ranking title at Players Championship 18—by defeating Ryan Joyce 8–4 in the final.

== Prize money ==
As part of a mass boost in prize money for Professional Darts Corporation (PDC) events in 2026, the prize fund for all 2026 European Tour events rose to £230,000, of which the winner will receive £35,000.

Stage (num. of players)		Prize money
Winner	(1)	£35,000
Runner-up	(1)	£15,000
Semi-finalists	(2)	£10,000
Quarter-finalists	(4)	£8,000
Third round losers	(8)	£5,000
Second round losers	(16)	£3,500*
First round losers	(16)	£2,000*
Total	£230,000	

- Pre-qualified players from the Orders of Merit who lose in their first match of the event shall not be credited with prize money on any Order of Merit.

== Qualification and format ==
The top 16 players on the two-year PDC Order of Merit were seeded entered the tournament in the second round, while the next 16 highest-ranked players from the one-year PDC Pro Tour Order of Merit automatically qualified for the first round. The seedings were confirmed on 9 April. The remaining 16 places went to players from four qualifying events – 10 from the Tour Card Holder Qualifier (held on 15 April), four from the Host Nation Qualifier (held on 16 May), one from the Nordic & Baltic Associate Member Qualifier (held on 24 April), and one from the East European Associate Member Qualifier (held on 12 April).

Luke Humphries, Michael van Gerwen, Jonny Clayton, Gerwyn Price and Josh Rock withdrew and were replaced by Rob Cross, Dimitri Van den Bergh, Richard Veenstra, Christian Kist and Cristo Reyes. Wessel Nijman, Damon Heta, Luke Woodhouse, Daryl Gurney, and Dave Chisnall moved up to become the 12th, 13th, 14th, 15th, and 16th seeds, respectively.

Seeded players

1. Gian van Veen (NED) (third round)
2. James Wade (ENG) (third round)
3. Stephen Bunting (ENG) (second round)
4. Danny Noppert (NED) (second round)
5. Ryan Searle (ENG) (third round)
6. Chris Dobey (ENG) (second round)
7. Nathan Aspinall (ENG) (second round)
8. Ross Smith (ENG) (second round)
9. Martin Schindler (GER) (second round)
10. Jermaine Wattimena (NED) (second round)
11. Mike De Decker (BEL) (second round)
12. Wessel Nijman (NED) (quarter-finals)
13. Damon Heta (AUS) (semi-finals)
14. Luke Woodhouse (ENG) (champion)
15. Daryl Gurney (NIR) (second round)
16. Dave Chisnall (ENG) (quarter-finals)

PDC Pro Tour Order of Merit qualifiers
- Dirk van Duijvenbode (NED) (second round)
- Niko Springer (GER) (third round)
- Niels Zonneveld (NED) (second round)
- Krzysztof Ratajski (POL) (second round)
- William O'Connor (IRL) (third round)
- Joe Cullen (ENG) (second round)
- Ryan Joyce (ENG) (runner-up)
- Kevin Doets (NED) (quarter-finals)
- Andrew Gilding (ENG) (second round)
- Cameron Menzies (SCO) (third round)
- Karel Sedláček (CZE) (second round)

Tour Card qualifier
- Alan Soutar (SCO) (first round)
- Max Hopp (GER) (first round)
- Ricky Evans (ENG) (semi-finals)
- Lukas Wenig (GER) (first round)
- James Hurrell (ENG) (first round)
- Jeffrey de Zwaan (NED) (first round)
- Ian White (ENG) (first round)
- Jimmy van Schie (NED) (quarter-finals)
- Sebastian Białecki (POL) (third round)
- Justin Hood (ENG) (third round)
Host Nation qualifier
- Paul Krohne (GER) (first round)
- Marcel Hausotter (GER) (first round)
- Daniel Klose (GER) (first round)
- Jason Riedtke (GER) (first round)
Nordic & Baltic qualifier
- Teemu Harju (FIN) (first round)
East European qualifier
- Nándor Major (HUN) (first round)
Reserve list
- Rob Cross (ENG) (first round)
- Dimitri Van den Bergh (BEL) (second round)
- Richard Veenstra (NED) (first round)
- Christian Kist (NED) (first round)
- Cristo Reyes (ESP) (first round)

== Summary ==
=== First round ===
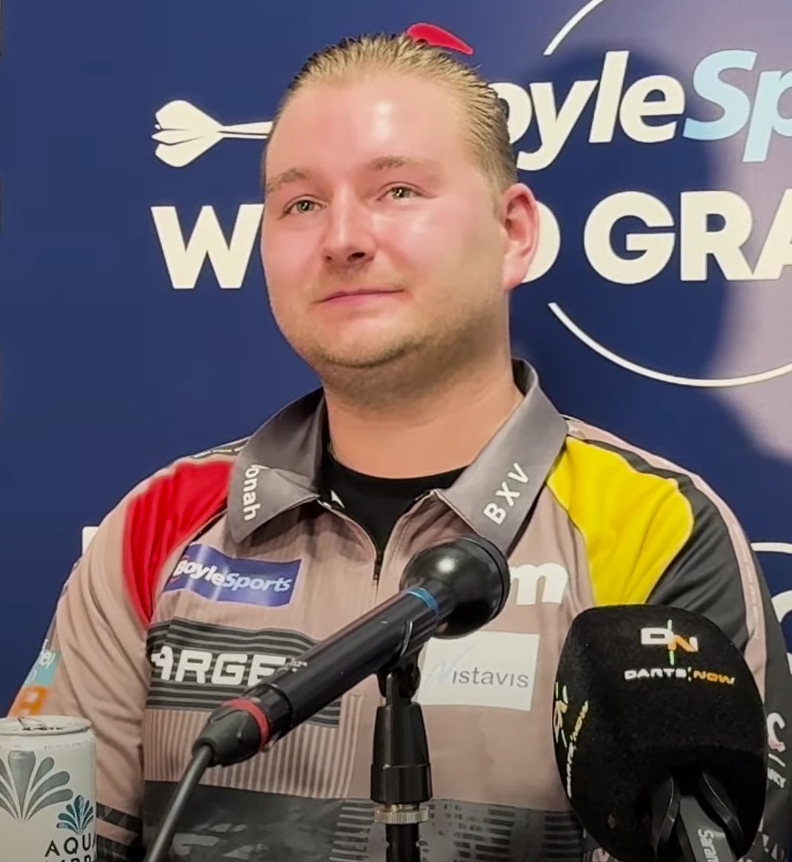
Dimitri Van den Bergh (pictured in 2024) made his first European Tour appearance in 420 days, defeating Alan Soutar 6–2 in the first round.

The first round (best of 11 legs) was played on 29 May. Cameron Menzies recorded the highest three-dart average of the opening round, averaging 108.41 as he defeated Rob Cross 6–4. "Rob [Cross] is coming back and he pushed me, but that's the best game I've played in a long time, and I needed that win," commented Menzies after the match. Menzies was one of three players to hit a 170 checkout during the first day of action; William O'Connor converted one during his 6–4 victory over Cristo Reyes, while Lukas Wenig landed finishes of 170 and 160 despite losing 6–3 to Kevin Doets. Niko Springer was the first round's only victorious German player of the nation's seven competitors, defeating Hungarian qualifier Nándor Major 6–2 to join seeded player Martin Schindler in the second round. Justin Hood averaged 103.38 during his 6–4 win against Max Hopp. All four host nation qualifiers were eliminated: debutant Jason Riedtke was beaten in a deciding leg to Karel Sedláček, Daniel Klose lost 6–3 to Krzysztof Ratajski, Paul Krohne was whitewashed by Dirk van Duijvenbode, and Marcel Hausotter lost 6–1 to Joe Cullen.

The 2020 World Matchplay champion Dimitri Van den Bergh competed on the European Tour for the first time in 420 days and defeated Alan Soutar 6–2, winning the last six legs of the match. Speaking afterwards, the Belgian insisted that he was "working so hard behind the scenes" and claimed that he can "do so much more". Jimmy van Schie made a successful European Tour debut, whitewashing Ian White while hitting 85 per cent of his attempts at double. Ryan Joyce converted a 150 finish with three bullseyes on his way to defeating Christian Kist 6–3. Sebastian Białecki won five legs in a row to beat James Hurrell 6–3. Niels Zonneveld and Andrew Gilding prevailed 6–4 in their respective victories over Richard Veenstra and Jeffrey de Zwaan, while Ricky Evans defeated Finnish qualifier Teemu Harju 6–1.

=== Second round ===
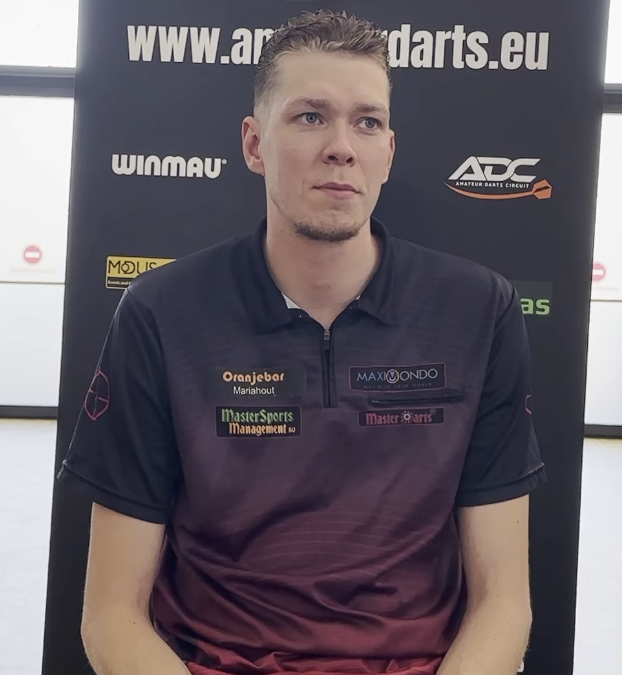
Jimmy van Schie (pictured in 2024) reached the quarter-finals in his European Tour debut.

The second round (best of 11 legs) was played on 30 May. Number one seed Gian van Veen overturned a 5–2 deficit to produce a comeback victory in a deciding leg against Dimitri Van den Bergh. In his post-match interview, Van Veen said that Van den Bergh's finishing made up for his scoring as he raced into the lead. "It’s been difficult the last couple of months, I need to work hard for it, but, I’m still here and winning games and that’s what it’s all about," he added. Niko Springer averaged 102.21 in a 6–2 win over eighth seed Ross Smith, the previous week's champion at the International Darts Open. Springer's compatriot Martin Schindler, the ninth seed, was eliminated in a deciding-leg loss to Ryan Joyce. Jimmy van Schie continued his debut run by beating eleventh seed Mike De Decker 6–1, which was De Decker's seventh consecutive defeat on the European Tour. Justin Hood and Sebastian Białecki joined Van Schie in reaching the final day of a European Tour event for the first time; Hood averaged just under 100 in a 6–1 victory over tenth seed Jermaine Wattimena, while Białecki defeated sixth seed Chris Dobey 6–4 to advance to his first third-round appearance in his thirteenth event. The match between Luke Woodhouse and Andrew Gilding was interrupted by a false fire alarm that halted action for around thirty minutes; Woodhouse won the match 6–3 after play resumed.

Wessel Nijman earned a 6–1 win over Krzysztof Ratajski. "I'll take the 98 average, I'm feeling really confident and really relaxed to be honest," commented Nijman, who said "today was one of those days" where everything went his way. Nijman ended up being the only previous winner on the 2026 European Tour to progress to the third round after the eliminations of Smith and seventh seed Nathan Aspinall, the latter being beaten 6–3 by Kevin Doets. Dave Chisnall and Ricky Evans both reached the final day for the first time in 2026 with their respective victories over Joe Cullen and fifteenth seed Daryl Gurney. Cameron Menzies converted checkouts of 148 and 107 as he defeated third seed Stephen Bunting 6–2. James Wade and William O'Connor were 6–2 winners over Niels Zonneveld and fourth seed Danny Noppert, while Ryan Searle and Damon Heta claimed 6–4 victories against Dirk van Duijvenbode and Karel Sedláček.

=== Final day ===
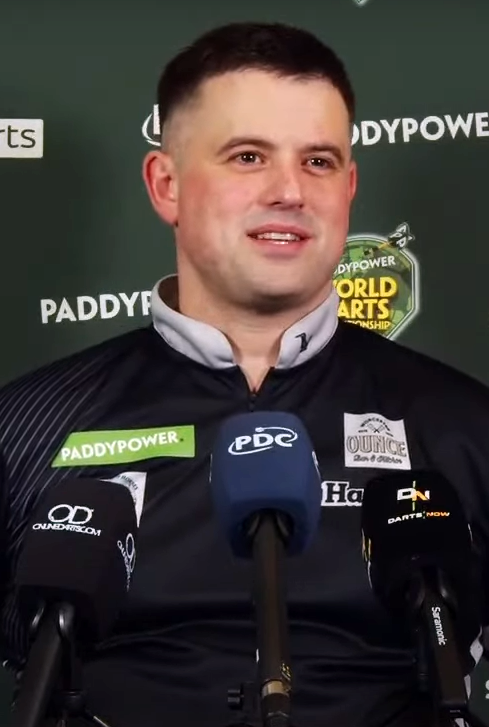
Luke Woodhouse (pictured in 2024) won his first European Tour title by defeating Ryan Joyce 8–4 in the final.

The third round, quarter-finals, semi-finals and final were played on 31 May. The third round and quarter-finals were contested over the best of 11 legs, the semi-finals over the best of 13 legs, and the final over the best of 15 legs. The final day saw Ryan Joyce and Luke Woodhouse reach the final. Joyce began the day by defeating Niko Springer 6–4, eliminating the last German player left in the field after Joyce had already beaten Martin Schindler. He followed a 6–1 victory over Dave Chisnall by winning a deciding leg against Damon Heta, who missed a match dart at the bullseye in the penultimate leg. Woodhouse eliminated Cameron Menzies in a 6–1 win, then ended the run of Jimmy van Schie by defeating the Dutchman 6–3. In the semi-finals, he earned a 7–2 victory over Ricky Evans, who reached his first European Tour semi-final since 2019. English compatriots Joyce and Woodhouse both reached their second European Tour final and were looking for their first title, having finished as runner-up at the 2025 European Darts Trophy and the 2025 Swiss Darts Trophy, respectively.

Woodhouse won the opening leg of the final, and followed a break of throw by landing a 140 checkout to lead 3–0. Joyce won back-to-back legs to reduce his deficit to 3–2. They traded the throw as Woodhouse maintained his two-leg advantage at 5–3. Joyce registered another leg to make it 6–4 but Woodhouse won the next to go one away from victory. In the twelfth leg, Joyce missed double 16 for a 108 checkout, and Woodhouse capitalised by hitting a 160 finish to win the match 8–4. Woodhouse finished the final with a three-dart average of 98.61, while Joyce averaged 94.46.

Woodhouse won his first European Tour title and second PDC ranking title, having won his first ranking title twelve days earlier by defeating Andrew Gilding in the final of Players Championship 18. He became the third first-time champion on the 2026 European Tour, after Wessel Nijman and Ross Smith. He was also the 2026 season's eighth different European Tour champion in eight events, a feat that had only been achieved previously in 2014. "It's like buses. You wait for one for ages, then two come along at once," joked Woodhouse in his post-match interview. He believed that neither he nor Joyce played their best game but called the win "unbelievable", adding that he hoped to bring his confidence into the upcoming World Matchplay. "I tried my best, but it just didn't happen today," said Joyce in defeat, calling his opponent a "very solid" and "very dependable" player.

== Draw ==
The draw was confirmed on 28 May. Numbers to the left of a player's name show the seedings for the top 16 in the tournament. The figures to the right of a player's name state their three-dart average in a match. The reserve players are indicated by 'Alt'. Players in bold denote match winners.

**First round** (best of 11 legs); 29 May
Alan Soutar 80.89	2
**Alt**	**Dimitri Van den Bergh 85.76**	**6**
**Joe Cullen 92.78**	**6**
Marcel Hausotter 84.77	1
**Niko Springer 93.25**	**6**
Nándor Major 86.60	2
**Ryan Joyce 90.16**	**6**
Alt	Christian Kist 81.53	3
**William O'Connor 94.20**	**6**
Alt	Cristo Reyes 88.75	4
**Karel Sedláček 86.09**	**6**
(Germany) Jason Riedtke 77.89	5
**Dirk van Duijvenbode 86.71**	**6**
Paul Krohne 78.74	0
**Krzysztof Ratajski 91.77**	**6**
Daniel Klose 80.23	3
**Niels Zonneveld 89.34**	**6**
Alt	Richard Veenstra 82.56	4
**Ricky Evans 91.09**	**6**
Teemu Harju 84.72	1
**Kevin Doets 92.35**	**6**
Lukas Wenig 89.84	3
**Justin Hood 103.38**	**6**
Max Hopp 93.74	4
**Cameron Menzies 108.41**	**6**
Alt	Rob Cross 99.02	4
**Andrew Gilding 88.95**	**6**
Jeffrey de Zwaan 87.99	4
James Hurrell 86.09	3
**Sebastian Białecki 100.35**	**6**
Ian White 78.72	0
**Jimmy van Schie 96.97**	**6**

**Second round** (best of 11 legs); 30 May
**1**	**Gian van Veen 96.75**	**6**
Alt	Dimitri Van den Bergh 90.37	5
**16**	**Dave Chisnall 92.44**	**6**
Joe Cullen 93.04	4
8	Ross Smith 86.68	2
**Niko Springer 102.21**	**6**
9	Martin Schindler 86.43	5
**Ryan Joyce 88.47**	**6**
4	Danny Noppert 85.24	2
**William O'Connor 88.33**	**6**
**13**	**Damon Heta 89.11**	**6**
Karel Sedláček 89.71	4
**5**	**Ryan Searle 89.77**	**6**
Dirk van Duijvenbode 90.57	4
**12**	**Wessel Nijman 98.46**	**6**
Krzysztof Ratajski 91.90	1
**2**	**James Wade 94.75**	**6**
Niels Zonneveld 93.55	2
15	Daryl Gurney 92.32	3
**Ricky Evans 96.00**	**6**
7	Nathan Aspinall 89.28	3
**Kevin Doets 88.65**	**6**
10	Jermaine Wattimena 87.86	1
**Justin Hood 99.17**	**6**
3	Stephen Bunting 92.72	2
**Cameron Menzies 96.17**	**6**
**14**	**Luke Woodhouse 92.44**	**6**
Andrew Gilding 88.21	3
6	Chris Dobey 96.39	3
**Sebastian Białecki 98.03**	**6**
11	Mike De Decker 80.79	1
**Jimmy van Schie 87.05**	**6**

**Third round** (best of 11 legs); 31 May
1	van Veen 91.43	5
**16**	**Chisnall 95.34**	**6**
Springer 91.32	4
**Joyce 88.44**	**6**
O'Connor 93.81	5
**13**	**Heta 91.31**	**6**
5	Searle 93.00	3
**12**	**Nijman 97.59**	**6**
2	Wade 97.16	4
**Evans 95.56**	**6**
**Doets 92.41**	**6**
Hood 88.29	3
Menzies 81.54	1
**14**	**Woodhouse 95.54**	**6**
Białecki 85.34	4
**van Schie 90.50**	**6**

**Quarter-finals** (best of 11 legs); 31 May
16	Chisnall 78.17	1
**Joyce 90.13**	**6**
**13**	**Heta 93.88**	**6**
12	Nijman 93.65	2
**Evans 97.36**	**6**
Doets 91.48	3
**14**	**Woodhouse 93.49**	**6**
van Schie 90.15	3

**Semi-finals** (best of 13 legs); 31 May
**Joyce 94.36**	**7**
13	Heta 88.23	6
Evans 90.78	2
**14**	**Woodhouse 92.89**	**7**

**Final** (best of 15 legs); 31 May
Joyce 94.46	4
**14**	**Woodhouse 98.61**	**8**
