= 2008 Malta Open darts =

Malta Open

Tournament information
- Dates: 20 November 2008
- Country: Malta
- Organisation(s): BDO, WDF, MDA
- Winner's share: €1,200

Champion(s)
- (Netherlands) Jermaine Wattimena

2008 Malta Open was a darts tournament part of the annual, Malta Open, which took place in Malta in 2008.

== Results ==
Round	Player
Winner	(Netherlands) Jermaine Wattimena
Final	(Malta) Vincent Busuttil
Semi-finals	(England) Roy Brown
Semi-finals	(Greece) John Michael
Quarter-finals	(England) Alan Bone
Quarter-finals	(England) Chris Aubrey
Quarter-finals	(England) Andy Rutter
Quarter-finals	(Malta) Gordon Stanmore
Last 16	(Malta) Godfrey Abela
Last 16	(Malta) Charles Ghiller
Last 16	(England) Martyn Cooper
Last 16	(Malta) Paul Sammat
Last 16	(Malta) Alfred Desira
Last 16	(Germany) Andreas Krockel
Last 16	(Germany) Michael Wolf
Last 16	(Cyprus) Tony Croxford
Preliminary round	(Cyprus) Roger Bloxham
Preliminary round	(Cyprus) Dave Szerlowski
