= Jermaine Wattimena =

Dutch darts player (born 1988)

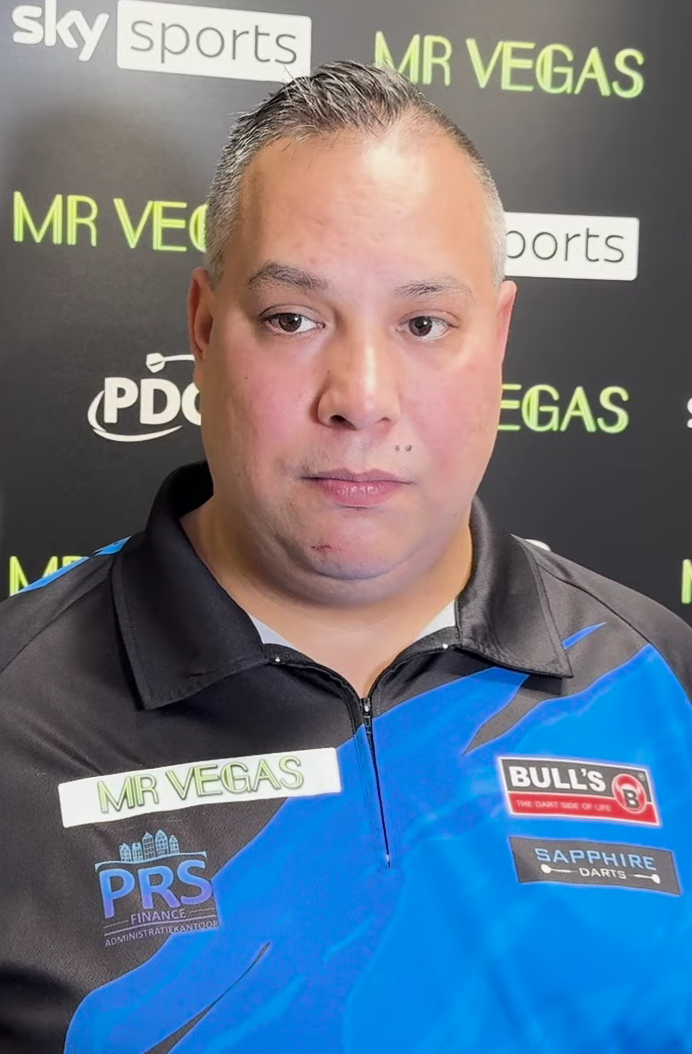
- Wattimena at the 2024 Grand Slam of Darts

Personal information
- Nickname: "The Machine Gun"
- Born: 9 March 1988 (age 38) Westervoort, Netherlands

Sport
- Sport: Darts
- Playing since: 2006
- Darts: 22g Winmau Signature
- Laterality: Right-handed
- Walk-on music: "Bella Ciao" by Hardwell and Maddix

Organisation (see split in darts)
- BDO: 2008–2014
- PDC: 2014–present (Tour Card 2015–present)
- Current world ranking: (PDC) 18 (5 November 2026)

WDF major events – best performances
- World Masters: Last 24: 2009

PDC premier events – best performances
- World Championship: Last 32: 2018, 2019, 2021, 2025, 2026
- World Matchplay: Last 16: 2025
- World Grand Prix: Quarter-final: 2019
- UK Open: Last 16: 2018, 2019
- Grand Slam: Quarter-final: 2024, 2026
- European Championship: Runner-up: 2024
- Premier League: Challenger: 2020
- PC Finals: Semi-final: 2025
- Masters: Last 32: 2025, 2026
- World Series Finals: Last 16: 2019

Other tournament wins
- Years
German Gold Cup	2014
Malta Open	2008
Players Championships (x3)
2025 (x2), 2026 (x1)

Jermaine Wattimena (born 9 March 1988) is a Dutch professional darts player who competes in Professional Darts Corporation (PDC) events, where he achieved a peak ranking of world number sixteen on two occasions in 2026. A PDC Tour Card holder since 2015, he reached his first major final in 2024, finishing as runner-up at the European Championship. He won his first two PDC ranking titles in 2025 Players Championship events and added a third at Players Championship 27 the following year. Wattimena represented the Netherlands in the 2019 PDC World Cup of Darts, reaching the semi-finals alongside Michael van Gerwen.

== Career ==
=== Early career ===
Wattimena won the first event he entered as he claimed the 2008 Malta Open by beating Vincent Busuttil in the final. He made his British Darts Organisation debut in a major event at the World Masters and won four games to reach the last 24 where he lost 3–0 to Steve Douglas. In 2014, Wattimena won the German Gold Cup courtesy of defeating Jan Dekker 3–2 in the final. Later in the year he qualified for the 2015 PDC World Championship by winning the Central European Qualifier, concluding with a 6–3 victory over Kenny Neyens. Wattimena entered the event in the preliminary round and narrowly lost 4–3 to Robert Marijanović, missing three match darts in the final leg.

=== 2015 ===
He entered PDC Qualifying School in January 2015 and was eliminated in the final round of the third day by Steve Douglas. However, Wattimena had already done enough through the Order of Merit to not even need to play on the fourth day as he finished joint second on the Order of Merit to earn a two-year PDC tour card. He qualified for the UK Open and defeated Jonny Clayton 5–1 in the first round, but then lost to Kevin McDine 5–4. Wattimena twice lost in the last 16 of Players Championship events during the year and beat Robert Marijanović 6–5 at the European Darts Grand Prix, but was then knocked out 6–3 by Peter Wright in the second round.

=== 2016 ===
In the first round of the 2016 World Championship, Wattimena lost 3–1 to Mensur Suljović. He overcame Andy Smith 6–5 and Kevin Dowling 6–1 at the UK Open, before losing 9–7 to Alan Norris in the third round. At the 15th Players Championship wins over Jonny Clayton, David Pallett, Peter Wright, Simon Stevenson and Jelle Klaasen ensured Wattimena played in his first PDC semi-final and he was defeated 6–3 by Michael van Gerwen. He qualified for seven European Tour events during the season and, although he didn't get past the second round in any of them, his consistent play saw him make his debut in the European Championship, where he lost 6–1 to Mensur Suljović in the first round.

=== 2017–2023 ===
He lost 3–1 in the opening round of the World Championship for the second year in a row in the 2017 event, this time to Daryl Gurney. He knocked out Mick Todd, Dave Chisnall, Robert Thornton, Kyle Anderson and Benito van de Pas at the seventh Players Championship to reach his second PDC semi-final, where he was defeated by Kim Huybrechts 6–3. He reached third PDC semi-final at Players Championship 17, where he beat Alan Tabern, Berry van Peer, Peter Hudson, Steve Beaton and Justin Pipe, before losing to Kevin Painter 6–3. He qualified for five European Tour events over 2017, failing to make it past the Last 32 in any of them, meaning he did not qualify for the 2017 European Championship. He made a third Players Championship semi-final of the year in the final weekend in Barnsley, at Players Championship 21, where he knocked out Ross Twell, Ian White, Kevin Painter, Peter Jacques and Michael Smith, before a 6–2 defeat to Adrian Lewis. This was enough for him to qualify for the Players Championship Finals, as the 29th seed. Wattimena started off with a 6–0 whitewash win against Keegan Brown. He saw off Mickey Mansell 6–3 in the second round. However, in the last 16, he was defeated 10–9 by Steve Beaton in a deciding leg, having levelled from 9–5 down. He picked up £8,000 from the Players Championship Finals. Wattimena's consistent improvement and progression up the rankings was rewarded with a 'challenger' spot for the 2020 Premier League in Rotterdam.

=== 2024 ===
On the 2024 European Tour, Wattimena reached the quarter-finals of the Belgian Darts Open, the German Darts Grand Prix, and the Czech Darts Open; he lost 6–2 to Luke Littler and Michael van Gerwen in the first two events, and lost 6–4 to Kim Huybrechts in the third.

His performances on the European Tour led to him qualifying for the European Championship, where he reached a first major final after defeating four major champions, including the reigning world champion Luke Humphries. He lost the final 11–3 to fellow maiden finalist Ritchie Edhouse. His run to the final saw him qualify for the Grand Slam of Darts, where he reached the quarter-finals before losing 16–2 to Littler.

=== 2025–present ===
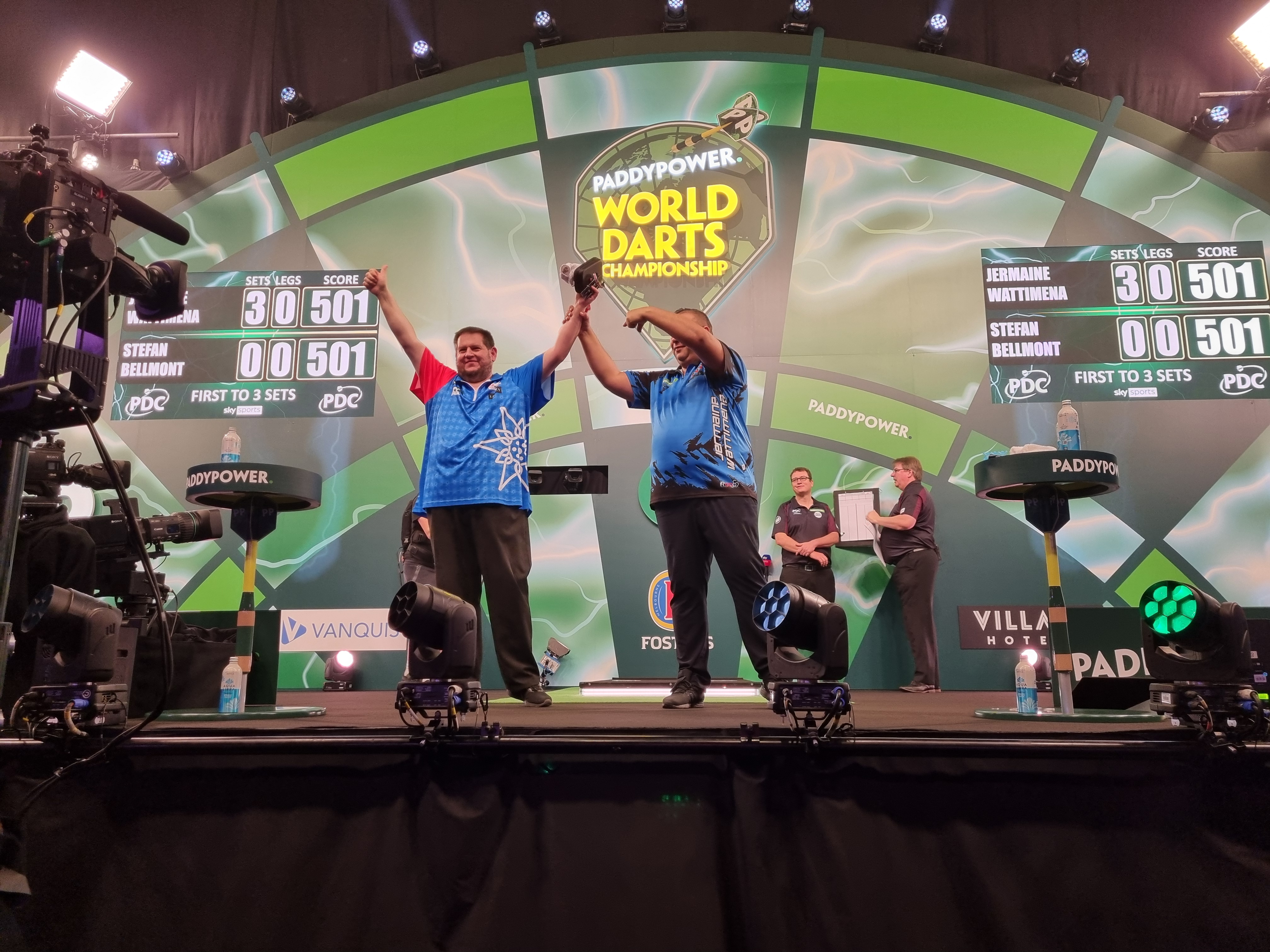
Wattimena (right) and Stefan Bellmont at the 2025 PDC World Darts Championship

Wattimena defeated 16th seed James Wade 3–0 in the second round of the 2025 World Championship. He was eliminated in the third round, losing 4–2 to Peter Wright. After five runner-up finishes in PDC ranking finals, he claimed his first title at Players Championship 23 on the 2025 PDC Pro Tour by defeating Lukas Wenig 8–5. He won a second title of the year at Players Championship 31, beating Nathan Aspinall 8–2 in the final. He reached his second major semi-final at the 2025 Players Championship Finals, where Aspinall defeated him 11–2.

Following successive 3–2 wins against Dominik Grüllich and Scott Williams, Wattimena was eliminated from the 2026 World Championship by Gary Anderson in a 4–3 defeat. He reached the finals of Players Championship 12 and Players Championship 17, losing to Wessel Nijman and Luke Humphries, respectively. He reached his first European Tour final at the European Darts Open, where he was beaten 8–6 by Krzysztof Ratajski. At Players Championship 27 in August, Wattimena eliminated world champion Luke Littler in the quarter-finals before reaching his fourth final of the year, where he beat Kevin Doets 8–6 to win his third PDC ranking title.

== Personal life ==
Wattimena is of Indonesian descent with family roots in Ambon Island.

== World Championship results ==
=== PDC World Championship ===
- 2015: Preliminary round (lost to Robert Marijanović 3–4) (legs)
- 2016: First round (lost to Mensur Suljović 1–3) (sets)
- 2017: First round (lost to Daryl Gurney 1–3)
- 2018: Second round (lost to Steve West 1–4)
- 2019: Third round (lost to Gary Anderson 3–4)
- 2020: Second round (lost to Luke Humphries 2–3)
- 2021: Third round (lost to Dimitri Van den Bergh 0–4)
- 2022: First round (lost to Boris Koltsov 0–3)
- 2023: First round (lost to Nathan Rafferty 2–3)
- 2024: Second round (lost to Martin Schindler 1–3)
- 2025: Third round (lost to Peter Wright 2–4)
- 2026: Third round (lost to Gary Anderson 3–4)

== Career finals ==
=== PDC major finals: 1 (1 runner-up) ===
Legend
European Championship (0–1)

Outcome	No.	Year	Championship	Opponent in the final	Score (Note: (l) = score in legs, (s) = score in sets.)
Runner-up	1.	2024	European Championship	Ritchie Edhouse	3–11 (l)

== Performance timeline ==
=== BDO ===
Tournament	2009	2014
World Masters	5R	2R

=== PDC ===
Tournament	2015	2016	2017	2018	2019	2020	2021	2022	2023	2024	2025	2026
PDC Ranked televised events
World Championship	Prel.	1R	1R	2R	3R	2R	3R	1R	1R	2R	3R	3R
World Masters (Note: A non-ranked event until 2025)	Did not qualify										1R	1R
UK Open	2R	3R	4R	5R	6R	4R	4R	4R	4R	3R	5R	4R
World Matchplay	Did not qualify			1R	1R	1R	1R	Did not qualify			2R	1R
World Grand Prix	Did not qualify			2R	QF	1R	Did not qualify				1R	2R
European Championship	DNQ	1R	DNQ	1R	2R	Did not qualify				F	2R	2R
Grand Slam	Did not qualify					RR	DNQ	2R	DNQ	QF	DNQ	QF
Players Championship Finals	DNQ	2R	3R	1R	1R	2R	1R	2R	3R	3R	SF	
PDC Non-ranked televised events
Premier League	Did not participate					C	Did not participate					
World Cup	Did not participate				SF	Did not participate						
World Series Finals	Did not qualify				1R	Did not qualify					1R	1R
Career statistics
Year-end ranking	70	49	40	29	23	26	36	39	51	36	18	

==== European Tour ====
Season	1	2	3	4	5	6	7	8	9	10	11	12	13	14	15
2015	Did not qualify								EDG; 2R						
2016	DDM; 1R	GDM; 2R	GDT; 2R	EDM; DNQ	ADO; 2R	EDO; DNQ	IDO; 2R	EDT; 2R	EDG; 2R	GDC; DNQ					
2017	GDC; 2R	DNQ		EDG; 1R	DNQ			EDO; 1R	DDM; DNQ	GDG; 2R	IDO; DNQ	EDT; 2R			
2018	EDO; 2R	GDG; 1R	GDO; 2R	ADO; DNQ	EDG; 3R	DDM; 3R	GDT; 3R	DDO; 2R	EDM; 1R	GDC; 1R	DDC; DNQ	IDO; 2R	EDT; 1R		
2019	EDO; 3R	GDC; 3R	GDG; DNQ	GDO; 2R	DNQ		DDM; 3R	DDO; QF	CDO; 3R	ADC; 1R	DNQ		GDT; 3R		
2020	BDC; 2R	GDC; 2R	DNQ												
2022	IDO; 1R	GDC; 1R	GDG; 1R	ADO; 1R	EDO; 1R	DNQ		DDC; 2R	EDM; 2R	Did not qualify					
2023	BSD; 1R	EDO; 1R	DNQ			DDC; 1R	BDO; 1R	CDO; DNQ	EDG; 1R	DNQ		HDT; 2R	GDC; DNQ		
2024	BDO; QF	GDG; QF	DNQ			BSD; 2R	DDC; 3R	DNQ		FDT; 2R	HDT; DNQ	SDT; 2R	CDO; QF		
2025	BDO; 2R	EDT; 3R	IDO; 1R	GDG; 2R	ADO; 3R	EDG; 1R	DDC; 1R	EDO; 2R	BSD; 2R	FDT; 1R	CDO; QF	HDT; 1R	SDT; 3R	GDC; QF	
2026	PDO; 3R	EDT; 3R	BDO; 3R	GDG; 2R	EDG; 3R	ADO; 2R	IDO; 3R	BSD; 2R	SDO; QF	EDO; F	HDT; 3R	CDO; 2R	FDT; 3R	SDT; 2R	DDC; 3R

==== Players Championships ====
Season	1	2	3	4	5	6	7	8	9	10	11	12	13	14	15	16	17	18	19	20	21	22	23	24	25	26	27	28	29	30	31	32	33	34
2015	Did not participate					COV; 4R	COV; 1R	COV; 4R	CRA; 1R	CRA; 2R	BAR; 1R	BAR; 1R	WIG; 1R	WIG; 3R	BAR; 1R	BAR; 2R	DUB; 2R	DUB; 2R	COV; 2R	COV; 1R														
2016	BAR; 1R	BAR; 3R	BAR; 4R	BAR; 2R	BAR; 4R	BAR; 1R	BAR; 3R	COV; 1R	COV; 2R	BAR; 4R	BAR; 3R	BAR; 1R	BAR; 2R	BAR; 2R	BAR; SF	BAR; 2R	DUB; 1R	DUB; 4R	BAR; 2R	BAR; 1R														
2017	BAR; 2R	BAR; 1R	BAR; 3R	BAR; 1R	DNP		BAR; SF	BAR; 2R	WIG; 1R	WIG; 4R	MIL; 1R	MIL; 2R	WIG; 2R	WIG; 2R	BAR; 1R	BAR; 3R	BAR; SF	BAR; 2R	DUB; 2R	DUB; 2R	BAR; SF	BAR; 3R												
2018	BAR; 2R	BAR; 3R	BAR; 3R	BAR; 2R	MIL; 3R	MIL; 4R	BAR; 3R	BAR; 1R	WIG; 3R	WIG; 2R	MIL; 3R	MIL; 2R	WIG; SF	WIG; SF	BAR; 1R	BAR; 4R	BAR; 1R	BAR; 2R	DUB; QF	DUB; 4R	BAR; 3R	BAR; 4R												
2019	WIG; F	WIG; 3R	WIG; 2R	WIG; 3R	BAR; 3R	BAR; QF	WIG; QF	WIG; 2R	BAR; 3R	BAR; QF	BAR; 3R	BAR; 3R	BAR; 1R	BAR; 2R	BAR; 3R	BAR; 3R	WIG; 2R	WIG; 1R	BAR; 3R	BAR; 3R	HIL; 4R	HIL; F	BAR; QF	BAR; QF	BAR; 1R	BAR; 1R	DUB; 4R	DUB; QF	BAR; 1R	BAR; QF				
2020	BAR; 1R	BAR; 3R	WIG; 2R	WIG; 2R	WIG; 1R	WIG; 4R	BAR; 4R	BAR; 1R	MIL; 1R	MIL; 4R	MIL; 4R	MIL; 3R	MIL; 3R	NIE; 1R	NIE; 3R	NIE; 3R	NIE; 4R	NIE; 3R	COV; F	COV; 2R	COV; 2R	COV; QF	COV; 3R											
2021	BOL; 1R	BOL; 3R	BOL; 2R	BOL; 2R	MIL; 1R	MIL; 3R	MIL; 3R	MIL; 1R	NIE; 4R	NIE; 4R	NIE; 2R	NIE; 1R	MIL; 2R	MIL; 1R	MIL; 2R	MIL; 1R	COV; 2R	COV; 1R	COV; 1R	COV; 3R	BAR; 1R	BAR; 2R	BAR; 2R	BAR; 2R	BAR; 2R	BAR; 1R	BAR; 2R	BAR; 2R	BAR; 2R	BAR; 2R				
2022	BAR; 2R	BAR; 1R	WIG; 1R	WIG; 3R	BAR; 1R	BAR; 1R	NIE; 1R	NIE; 4R	BAR; 1R	BAR; 2R	BAR; 3R	BAR; 1R	BAR; 2R	WIG; 1R	WIG; 1R	NIE; 1R	NIE; 1R	BAR; 2R	BAR; 2R	BAR; QF	BAR; 2R	BAR; 3R	BAR; 1R	BAR; 2R	BAR; 3R	BAR; 3R	BAR; 3R	BAR; 2R	BAR; QF	BAR; QF				
2023	BAR; 1R	BAR; 1R	BAR; 3R	BAR; 2R	BAR; 2R	BAR; 4R	HIL; 3R	HIL; 1R	WIG; 1R	WIG; 4R	LEI; 3R	LEI; 3R	HIL; 1R	HIL; 1R	LEI; 1R	LEI; 1R	HIL; 2R	HIL; 1R	BAR; 1R	BAR; QF	BAR; 1R	BAR; 1R	BAR; 1R	BAR; 1R	BAR; 3R	BAR; 2R	BAR; 1R	BAR; 1R	BAR; 3R	BAR; 2R				
2024	WIG; 1R	WIG; 2R	LEI; 2R	LEI; 3R	HIL; 2R	HIL; 3R	LEI; 1R	LEI; 3R	HIL; 2R	HIL; 1R	HIL; 4R	HIL; 2R	MIL; 2R	MIL; 1R	MIL; 3R	MIL; 1R	MIL; 2R	MIL; 3R	MIL; 2R	WIG; QF	WIG; 2R	MIL; 1R	MIL; 2R	WIG; 3R	WIG; 3R	WIG; 3R	WIG; 3R	WIG; 3R	LEI; 1R	LEI; 3R				
2025	WIG; QF	WIG; 2R	ROS; QF	ROS; 2R	LEI; 1R	LEI; 4R	HIL; 3R	HIL; 1R	LEI; 2R	LEI; 2R	LEI; 3R	LEI; 2R	ROS; 4R	ROS; 3R	HIL; 4R	HIL; 3R	LEI; 2R	LEI; F	LEI; 3R	LEI; 4R	LEI; 4R	HIL; 3R	HIL; W	MIL; 3R	MIL; 1R	HIL; 1R	HIL; 3R	LEI; QF	LEI; 1R	LEI; 1R	WIG; W	WIG; SF	WIG; 1R	WIG; QF
2026	HIL; 1R	HIL; 3R	WIG; 3R	WIG; 3R	LEI; 1R	LEI; 3R	LEI; 4R	LEI; 1R	WIG; 1R	WIG; 2R	MIL; 3R	MIL; F	HIL; 4R	HIL; 2R	LEI; 3R	LEI; 4R	LEI; F	LEI; 1R	MIL; 1R	MIL; 3R	WIG; 3R	WIG; 1R	LEI; 2R	LEI; 4R	HIL; 3R	HIL; 1R	LEI; W	LEI; 1R	ROS; QF	ROS; SF	ROS; 1R	ROS; 2R	LEI; 1R	LEI; QF

Performance Table Legend
W	Won the tournament	F	Finalist	SF	Semifinalist	QF	Quarterfinalist	#R; RR; Prel.	Lost in # round Round-robin; Preliminary round	DQ	Disqualified
DNQ	Did not qualify	DNP	Did not participate	WD	Withdrew	NH	Tournament not held	#R; RR; Prel.	Lost in # round Round-robin; Preliminary round	NYF	Not yet founded
