= Liga Dart Polska =

Tournament information
- Venue: Various; Przystanek Dartera (final stage)
- Location: Various; Poznań (final stage)
- Country: Poland
- Established: 2023
- Organisation(s): Dart Polska
- Format: Legs
- Prize fund: PLN 8,000

Current champion(s)
- Tytus Kanik

Liga Dart Polska (League Darts Poland) is a series of amateur darts tournaments held in Poland, consisting of local qualifiers, from which 4 top players from each city participating in the competition advance to the grand final. The first edition of the series was held in 2023. First final stage was played in Falcon Bilard Club, Warsaw. The first winner of the tournament was Łukasz Wacławski.

== Format ==
Qualifying events for amateur players are organised by local darts teams and held in various locations across Poland. 4 players qualify through these events. The tournament format involves holding 6 qualifying tournaments in each city participating in the competition. The format for each qualifying tournament is "first to 5 legs." In each local qualifying tournament, players accumulate points for the final standings of their respective cities, with the top 4 players from each city advancing to the grand finals. The format for the Liga Dart Polska finals is as follows (as of 2023):

- Round 1 (64 players) - best of 11 legs
- Round 2 (32 players) - best of 11 legs
- Round 3 (16 players) - best of 11 legs
- Quarterfinals - best of 11 legs
- Semifinals - best of 13 legs
- Final - best of 15 legs

== Finals ==
Year	Champion	Av.	Score	Runner-Up	Av.	Prize Money			Venue
Year	Champion	Av.	Score	Runner-Up	Av.	Total	Ch.	R.-Up	Venue
2023	Łukasz Wacławski	77.45	8 – 6	Jacek Krupka	74.64	PLN 8,000	PLN 2,000	PLN 1,200	Falcon Bilard Club, Warsaw
2024	Tytus Kanik	88.22	8 – 2	Łukasz Wacławski	80.77	N/A			Przystanek Dartera, Poznań

== Participating cities ==
The following cities hosted local qualifiers in the second edition.

- Szczytno
- Tczew
- Gdańsk
- Skarżysko-Kamienna
- Jaworzno
- Częstochowa
- Elbląg
- Sosnowiec
- Nowy Sącz
- Poznań
- Kobiór
- Warsaw
- Bełchatów
- Świdnica
- Płock
- Ostrowiec Świętokrzyski
- Rzeszów
- Kraków

== First season (2023) ==
The inaugural season of the Polish Darts League (officially referred to as the "preseason") took place from March to June 2023. The finals were held at the Falcon Bilard Club in Warsaw.

Quarter-finals (best of 11 legs)
1	Witold Lewandowski 67.45	6
1	Krzysztof Chmielewski 72.55	5
1	Łukasz Wacławski 73.02	6
3	Grzegorz Sierpotowski 65.98	4
4	Krzysztof Kciuk 83.35	2
4	Jacek Krupka 86.45	6
2	Bartosz Sobczyński 77.04	2
1	Sebastian Biela 81.06	6

Semi-finals (best of 13 legs)
1	Witold Lewandowski 74.45	5
1	Łukasz Wacławski 72.64	7
4	Jacek Krupka 80.57	7
1	Sebastian Biela 75.22	2

Final (best of 15 legs)
1	Łukasz Wacławski 77.45	8
4	Jacek Krupka 74.64	6

== Second season (2024) ==
The second season of the League Darts Poland (officially referred to as the "first season") took place from September to February 2024. The finals were held at the Przystanek Dartera (Darter's Stop) in Poznań.

Quarter-finals (best of 11 legs)
1	Andrzej Potoczniak 73.63	1
8	Tytus Kanik 89.11	6
4	Paweł Moskot 73.92	6
5	Kazimierz Pawłowski 57.46	0
2	Łukasz Wacławski 76.00	6
7	Adrian Sawiński 74.75	2
3	Sebastian Biela 77.14	6
6	Hieronim Furgał 72.47	2

Semi-finals (best of 13 legs)
Tytus Kanik 85.54	7
Paweł Moskot 63.76	0
Łukasz Wacławski 70.17	7
Sebastian Biela 72.02	6

Final (best of 15 legs)
Tytus Kanik 88.22	8
Łukasz Wacławski 80.77	2
