= 2025 World Matchplay =

Darts tournament

2025 Betfred World Matchplay

Tournament information
- Dates: 19–27 July 2025
- Venue: Winter Gardens
- Location: Blackpool, England
- Organisation(s): Professional Darts Corporation (PDC)
- Format: Legs
- Prize fund: £800,000
- Winner's share: £200,000
- Nine-dart finish: Luke Littler
- High checkout: 170; Gerwyn Price; Josh Rock

Champion(s)
- Luke Littler (ENG)

The 2025 World Matchplay (known for sponsorship reasons as the 2025 Betfred World Matchplay) was a professional darts tournament that was held at the Winter Gardens in Blackpool, England, from 19 to 27 July 2025. It was the 32nd staging of the World Matchplay by the Professional Darts Corporation (PDC). The total prize fund was £800,000, with the winner receiving £200,000. The fourth edition of the Women's World Matchplay also took place on 27 July and was won by Lisa Ashton.

The tournament, sponsored by Betfred, featured 32 players: the top 16 players on the two-year PDC Order of Merit and the top 16 players from the one-year PDC Pro Tour Order of Merit who had not yet qualified. Cameron Menzies and Wessel Nijman made their debuts at the event. Michael Smith missed out on qualification for the first time since the 2013 edition, while James Wade qualified for the 20th consecutive time. Luke Humphries was the defending champion, having defeated Michael van Gerwen 18–15 in the 2024 final; however, he lost 10–8 to Gian van Veen in the first round.

Luke Littler hit a nine-dart finish in the eighth leg of his semi-final match against Josh Rock – the 10th nine-darter in the event's history. After Littler and Rock both landed back-to-back maximums (180s) to start the leg, Littler completed the nine-darter with a 141 checkout, denying Rock the chance to attempt the same feat. The pair also broke the record for the most combined maximums hit in a World Matchplay match with a total of 29; Littler later broke the record for most maximums hit by an individual player in a World Matchplay campaign with 64 in total.

Littler went on to win his first World Matchplay title, beating James Wade 18–13 in the final. At the age of 18, Littler became the youngest player to win the tournament, as well as the fifth player in history to complete the so-called PDC Triple Crown by winning the World Matchplay, the World Championship and the Premier League.

== Overview ==
=== Background ===
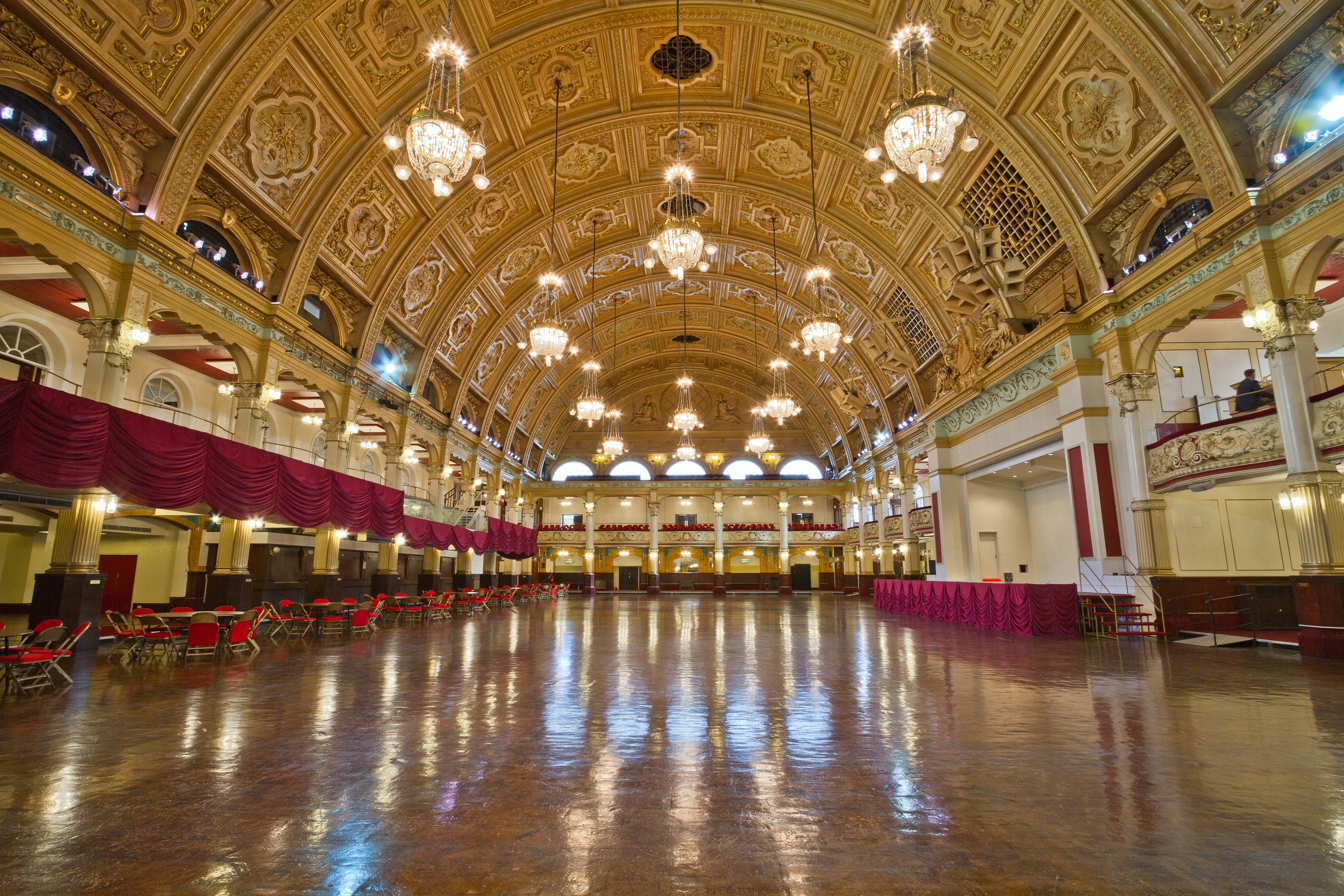
The tournament was held in the Empress Ballroom (pictured in 2016) at the Winter Gardens, Blackpool, England.

The 2025 World Matchplay was the 32nd edition of the tournament to be staged by the Professional Darts Corporation (PDC) since the inaugural event in 1994. Held annually at the Winter Gardens in Blackpool, England, with the exception of the 2020 event held in Milton Keynes, the inaugural champion was Larry Butler, who remains the only American to win a PDC major title; he defeated Dennis Priestley 16–12 in an upset victory in the final. In 2018, the World Matchplay trophy was renamed to the Phil Taylor Trophy, in honour of the sixteen-time champion who retired from professional darts following the 2018 World Championship. Taylor won his sixteenth and final World Matchplay title at the 2017 event. The Women's World Matchplay was introduced in 2022 as the PDC's first fully-televised women's tournament; the 2025 edition was won by Lisa Ashton.

The 2025 World Matchplay took place from 19 to 27 July 2025 in the Empress Ballroom at the Winter Gardens. British bookmaker Betfred continued its sponsorship of the event, extending its partnership with the PDC until 2030. Luke Humphries entered the tournament as defending champion after defeating Michael van Gerwen 18–15 in the 2024 final to win his first World Matchplay title, and looked to become the fourth player to retain the title after Taylor, Van Gerwen and Rod Harrington. Humphries and reigning world champion Luke Littler were considered favourites to win the tournament by bookmakers.

=== Format ===
The top 16 players on the PDC Order of Merit were seeded, and were drawn to compete against the 16 qualifiers from the PDC Pro Tour Order of Merit in the first round. All matches were in leg play format. All matches had to be won by two clear legs; if the scores were tied and the players could not be separated after an additional six legs, the match would be decided by a sudden death leg.

The number of legs required to win increased as the tournament progressed:

- First round: Best of 19 legs (sudden death at 12–12)
- Second round: Best of 21 legs (sudden death at 13–13)
- Quarter-finals: Best of 31 legs (sudden death at 18–18)
- Semi-finals: Best of 33 legs (sudden death at 19–19)
- Final: Best of 35 legs (sudden death at 20–20)

=== Prize money ===
The prize fund remained at £800,000, with £200,000 going to the winner. The winner also received the Phil Taylor Trophy.

Position (no. of players)		Prize money (Total: £800,000)
Winner	(1)	£200,000
Runner-up	(1)	£100,000
Semi-finalists	(2)	£50,000
Quarter-finalists	(4)	£30,000
Second round	(8)	£15,000
First round	(16)	£10,000

=== Broadcasts ===
The tournament was broadcast on Sky Sports in the United Kingdom and Ireland. Other broadcasters included DAZN in Germany, Austria and Switzerland; Peacock in the United States; FanDuel in the United States and Canada; Fox Sports in Australia; Sky Sport in New Zealand; Viaplay in the Netherlands, Iceland and Scandinavia; L'Équipe in France; VTM in Belgium; Nova in Czechia and Slovakia; and Sport1 in Hungary. It was also available on the PDC's streaming service, PDCTV, to international subscribers.

== Qualification ==
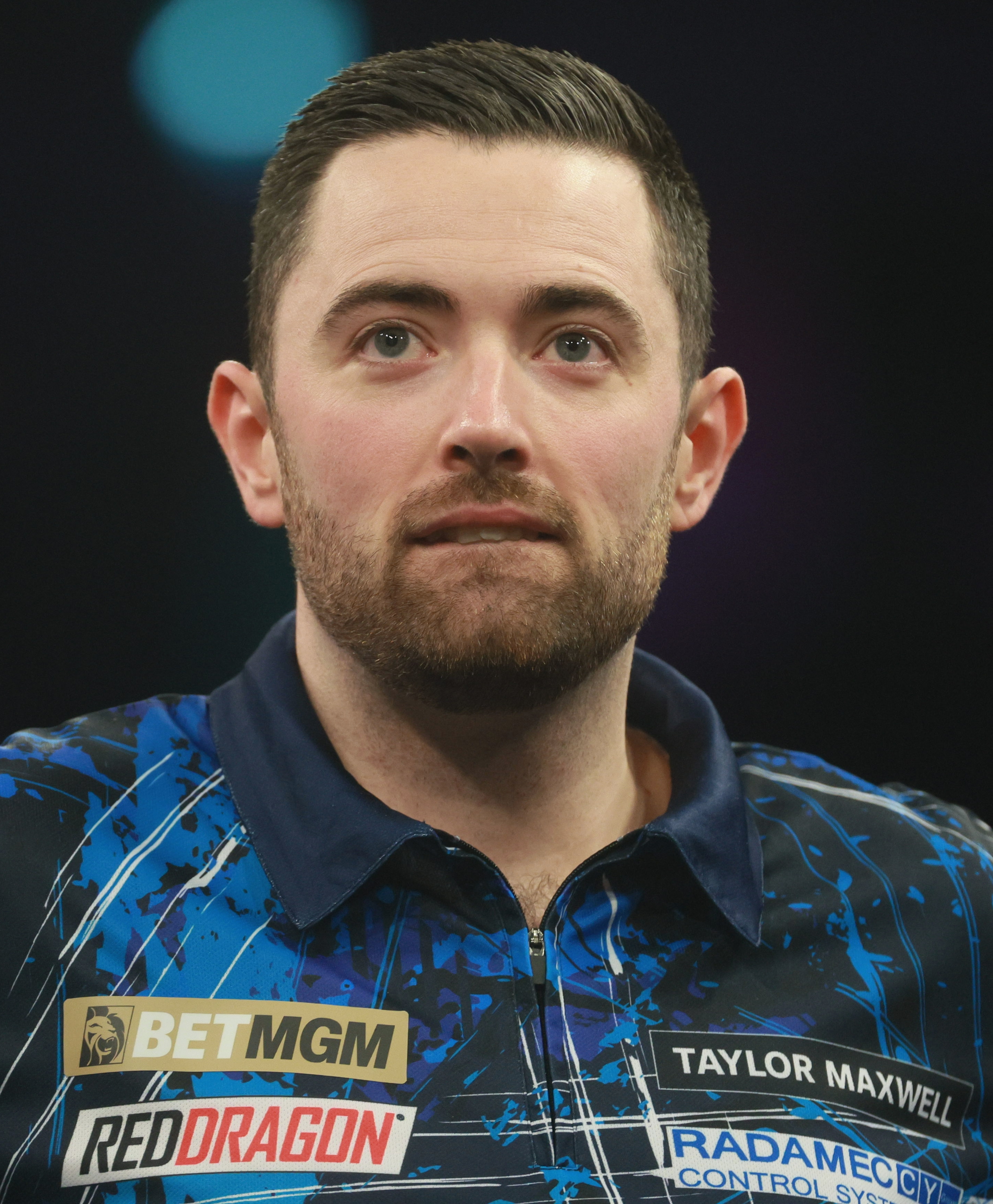
Luke Humphries (pictured) was the defending champion and number one seed going into the tournament.

The top 16 players on the two-year PDC Order of Merit at the cut-off point on 10 July were seeded for the tournament. The top 16 players on the one-year PDC Pro Tour Order of Merit, not to have already qualified through the main ranking, were unseeded.

Michael Smith, who won the 2023 PDC World Darts Championship and was runner-up at the 2019 World Matchplay, did not qualify for the event for the first time since the 2013 edition. Among other notable players to not qualify were 2020 champion Dimitri Van den Bergh, 2021 semi-finalist Krzysztof Ratajski and 2024 European Championship winner Ritchie Edhouse. Cameron Menzies and Wessel Nijman made their World Matchplay debuts, while 2007 champion James Wade made his 20th consecutive appearance at the event.

The following players qualified for the tournament:

PDC Order of Merit

1. Luke Humphries (ENG) (first round)
2. Luke Littler (ENG) (champion)
3. Michael van Gerwen (NED) (second round)
4. Stephen Bunting (ENG) (quarter-finals)
5. Jonny Clayton (WAL) (semi-finals)
6. Chris Dobey (ENG) (second round)
7. Damon Heta (AUS) (first round)
8. Nathan Aspinall (ENG) (first round)
9. James Wade (ENG) (runner-up)
10. Rob Cross (ENG) (first round)
11. Gerwyn Price (WAL) (quarter-finals)
12. Dave Chisnall (ENG) (first round)
13. Gary Anderson (SCO) (second round)
14. Ross Smith (ENG) (first round)
15. Peter Wright (SCO) (first round)
16. Danny Noppert (NED) (second round)

Pro Tour Order of Merit

1. Martin Schindler (GER) (first round)
2. Josh Rock (NIR) (semi-finals)
3. Cameron Menzies (SCO) (first round)
4. Gian van Veen (NED) (quarter-finals)
5. Wessel Nijman (NED) (second round)
6. Ryan Searle (ENG) (first round)
7. Mike De Decker (BEL) (second round)
8. Dirk van Duijvenbode (NED) (second round)
9. Jermaine Wattimena (NED) (second round)
10. Andrew Gilding (ENG) (quarter-finals)
11. Daryl Gurney (NIR) (first round)
12. Joe Cullen (ENG) (first round)
13. Ricardo Pietreczko (GER) (first round)
14. Luke Woodhouse (ENG) (first round)
15. Raymond van Barneveld (NED) (first round)
16. Ryan Joyce (ENG) (first round)

== Summary ==
=== First round ===
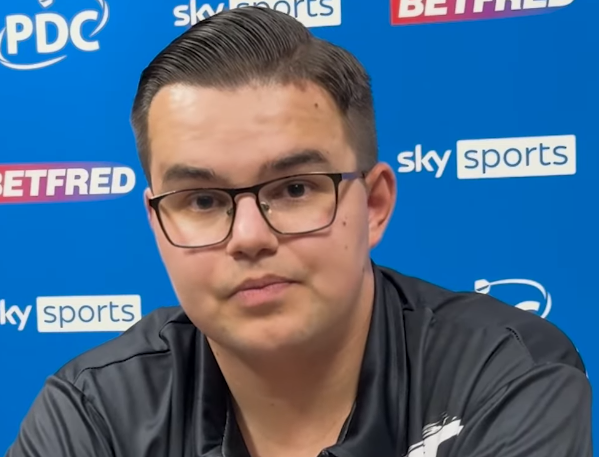
Gian van Veen (pictured) eliminated defending champion Luke Humphries.

The first round (best of 19 legs) began on 19 July, where the last two World Matchplay champions were defeated in their opening match. Top seed and defending champion Luke Humphries was eliminated, going out in an upset loss to Gian van Veen. Humphries took a 3–2 lead early on by hitting a 146 checkout, but Van Veen would eventually break Humphries's throw to go 8–7 ahead, before winning the match 10–8 after several missed match darts. In his post-match interview, Van Veen told Sky Sports that knocking out the defending champion was the "biggest win" of his career. Nathan Aspinall, the 2023 champion, also suffered an early exit by losing to debutant Wessel Nijman 10–6. Nijman stated that the win was "probably more special" than winning his first match at Alexandra Palace during the 2025 World Championship. Due to the loss, Aspinall dropped from 7th to 23rd on the PDC Order of Merit. Making his 20th consecutive appearance at the event, 2007 champion James Wade recorded his highest World Matchplay three-dart average (104.44) in his 10–3 victory over Joe Cullen, while Danny Noppert defeated debutant Cameron Menzies 10–2 – a match that included Menzies busting 178 by hitting a 180.

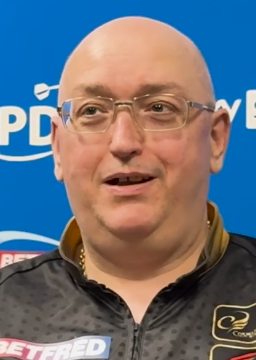
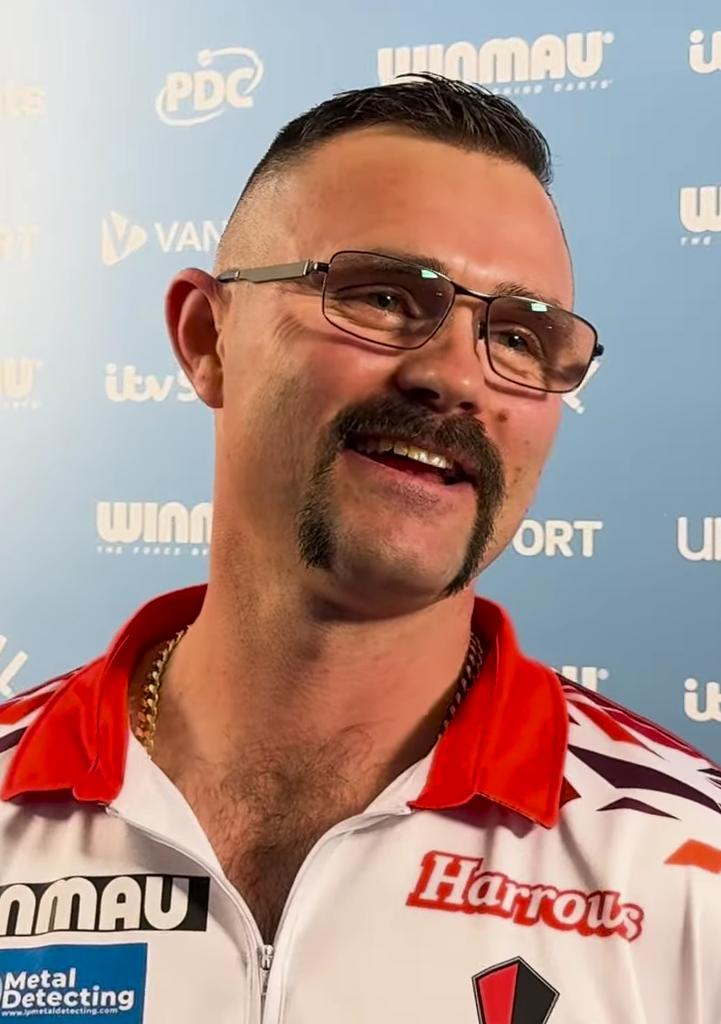
Andrew Gilding (left) and Damon Heta's (right) first-round match was the first of the tournament to go to a tiebreaker.

All four seeds that competed in the afternoon session on Sunday 20 July were eliminated. Former champions Rob Cross (10th seed) and Peter Wright (15th seed) lost to Dirk van Duijvenbode and Jermaine Wattimena respectively. Seventh seed Damon Heta and former UK Open winner Andrew Gilding were the first pairing of the tournament to go to a tiebreaker; Gilding, who missed double 12 for a nine-dart finish, eventually won 12–10. Twelfth seed Dave Chisnall was also beaten, losing 10–7 to World Grand Prix champion Mike De Decker, who hit a 148 checkout to secure victory.

Reigning world champion Luke Littler, who lost in his World Matchplay debut to Michael van Gerwen at the previous year's event, achieved his first win at the tournament by defeating Ryan Searle 10–2 with an average of nearly 109. He disclosed that he was putting "hours and hours" of his time into practising at home, saying that he was "glad it's paid off". Gary Anderson, the 2018 champion, advanced with a 10–5 win over Luke Woodhouse, who hit a high checkout of 167. Stephen Bunting defeated Ryan Joyce 10–8 in a rematch of their 2024 meeting, while 2023 runner-up Jonny Clayton beat Martin Schindler 10–7.

Three-time champion Van Gerwen reached the second round by defeating compatriot Raymond van Barneveld 10–6, but expressed dissatisfaction with his performance, stating: "I think in only one leg he had the darts on the double before me and I should have taken advantage of that." He added: "I think this could be the start of something really nice." Gerwyn Price beat Daryl Gurney 10–7, with the pair sharing an aggressive handshake and exchanging words after the match's conclusion, stemming from Gurney imitating Price's passionate celebrations after winning a leg. Gurney's World Cup-winning teammate Josh Rock claimed his first win at the World Matchplay in a 10–5 victory over Ross Smith, avenging his loss to Smith the previous year and hitting a 167 checkout in the process. Chris Dobey made the second round for the fourth consecutive year by beating Ricardo Pietreczko 10–5.

=== Second round ===
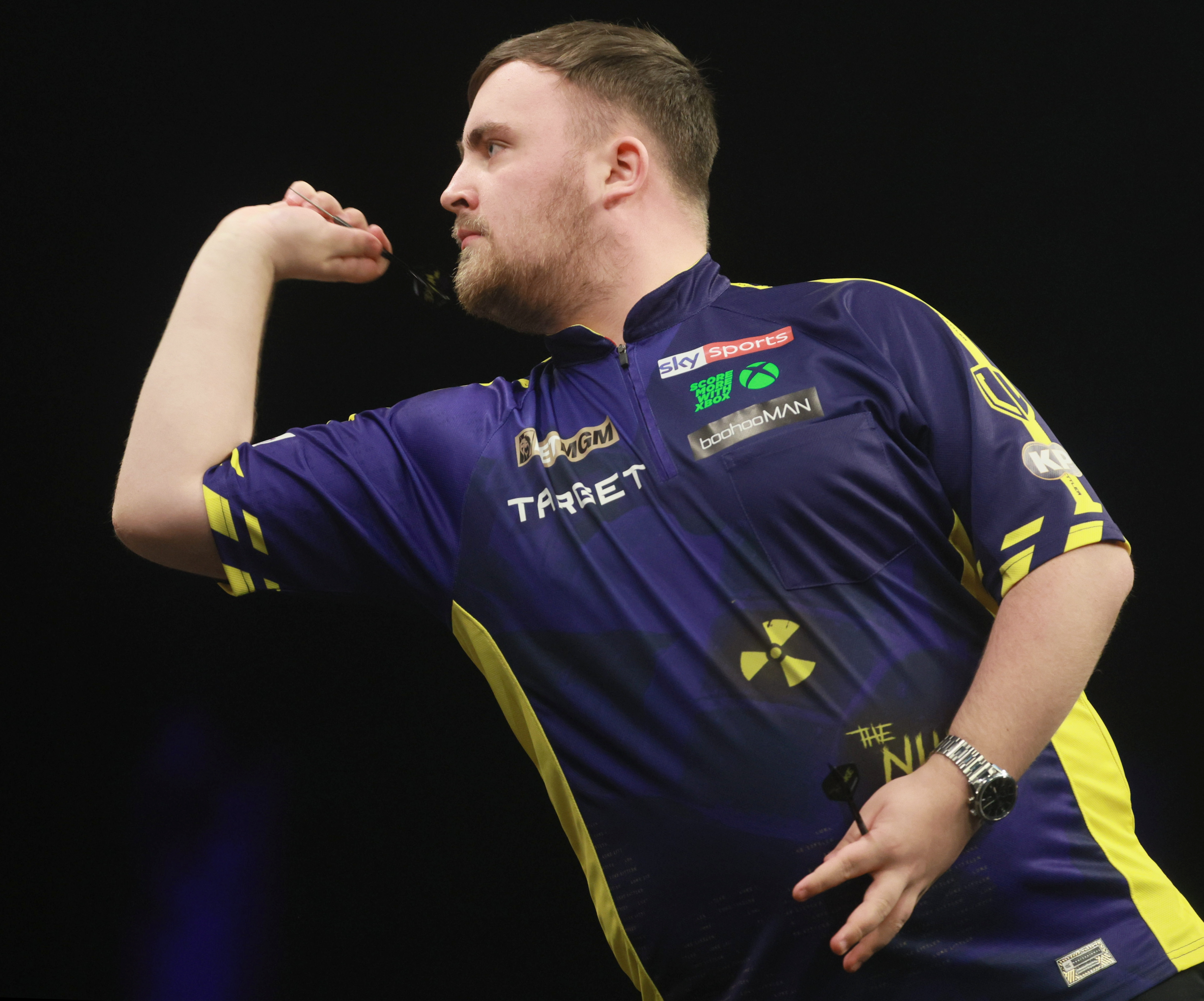
Luke Littler (pictured) completed a comeback from 7–2 down to defeat Jermaine Wattimena 13–11.

The second round (best of 21 legs) was played on 22 and 23 July. Gary Anderson won four consecutive legs to force a tiebreaker against Stephen Bunting at 10–10, but Bunting won the next two legs to triumph 12–10 and advance to the quarter-finals of the event for the second time. Bunting, who missed double 12 for a nine-dart finish in the 15th leg, revealed that he felt nervous playing "a legend of the sport", labelling Anderson "one of the best players to grace the stages". James Wade landed checkouts of 126, 121 and 108 on his way to defeating Wessel Nijman 11–5. Critical of his performance, Wade commented: "Wessel made a few mistakes, and I was fortunate he didn’t play how he can." Jonny Clayton set up a meeting with Bunting by beating Mike De Decker 11–8, while Gian van Veen continued his run in an 11–5 victory over Danny Noppert to set up a tie against Wade.

Jermaine Wattimena raced into a 4–0 lead against Luke Littler in the opening session of their match. Littler won the next two legs but found himself trailing 7–2 as the Dutchman took the next three. Littler won six legs in a row to take charge and lead 8–7, before the match entered a tiebreak situation at 10–10. Littler went on to hit double 10 and complete a 13–11 comeback victory. In his post-match interview, he proclaimed that he was "a world champion for a reason" and admitted that he had "not felt pressure like that since the first round of the world championships." The win extended Littler's unbeaten record against Wattimena to 5–0. The match between Josh Rock and Michael van Gerwen also required extra legs to decide a winner. Van Gerwen opened the contest with a 150 checkout to break Rock's throw and initially led 5–1. However, at 9–6, Van Gerwen missed opportunities to extend his lead and allowed Rock to win four consecutive legs and take the lead the first time, a run of legs that included a 152 checkout. Van Gerwen landed a 138 finish to level the score at 10–10 and send the match to a tiebreaker, but Rock pinned double 16 to win 13–11 and eliminate the three-time champion. Rock commented that his heart was "pumping throughout the whole game" and called the match "one of the best games" he had been involved in. Gerwyn Price recorded a three-dart average of 108.73 and hit eight 180s in a dominant 11–3 victory over Chris Dobey; he took pride in his performance by saying: "The middle part of the game I felt like I couldn't miss." Andrew Gilding reached a second successive World Matchplay quarter-final by beating Dirk van Duijvenbode 11–5.

=== Quarter-finals ===
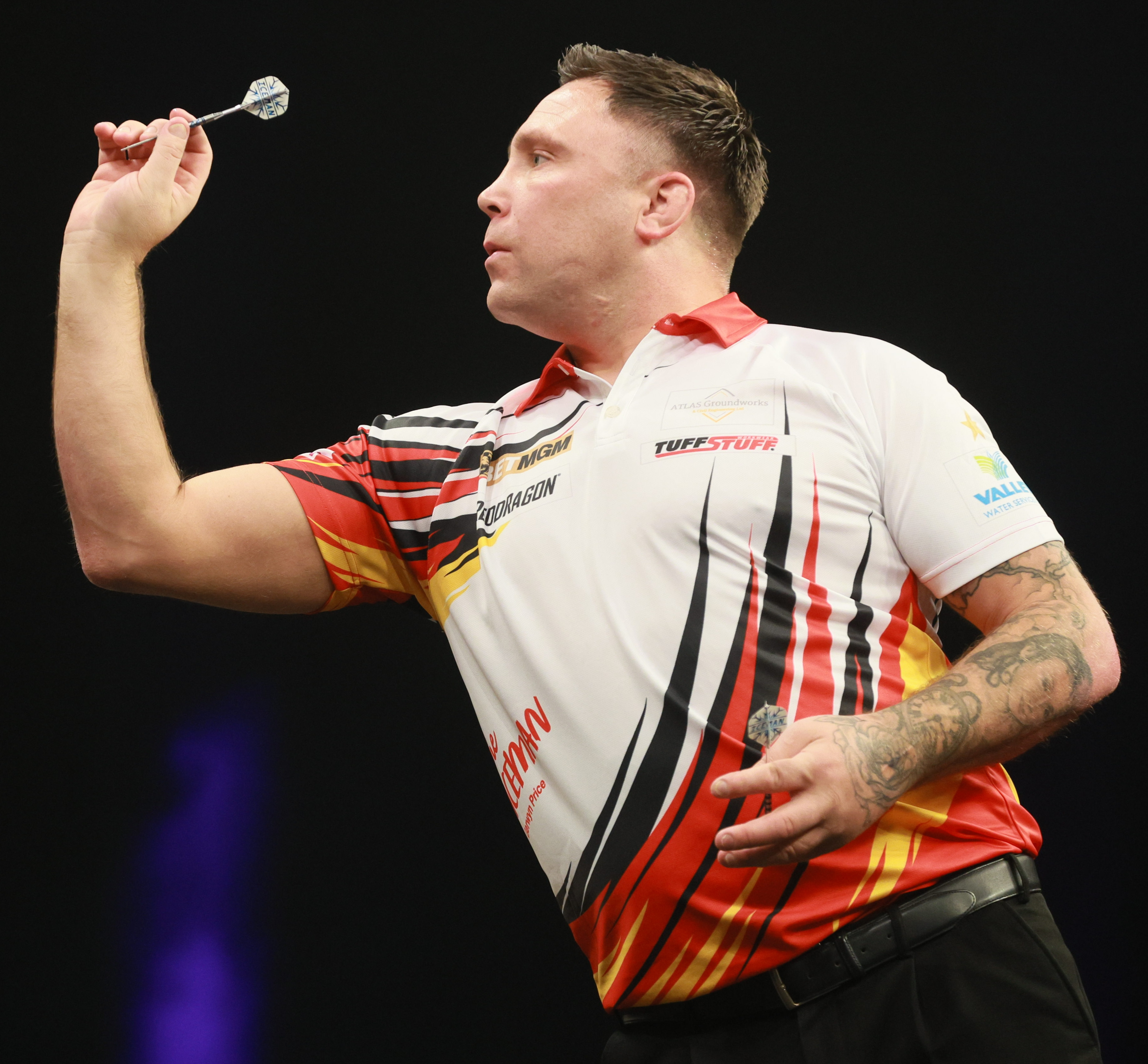
Gerwyn Price (pictured) achieved the first 170 checkout of the tournament.

The quarter-finals (best of 31 legs) were played on 24 and 25 July. James Wade, appearing in his 13th World Matchplay quarter-final, faced Gian van Veen in the round's opening match. In the opening session, Wade missed his first 11 attempts at double, allowing Van Veen to break his throw twice and take a 4–1 lead. The second session commenced and Wade won the next eight legs to gain control of the match. Van Veen put Wade under pressure by finding another break of throw in the 23rd leg to reduce the gap to 13–11, but the Dutchman squandered darts at double 16 in the 25th leg to close the distance even more. Wade seized his opportunities and converted a double 10 finish to win the match 16–13, despite a lower three-dart average and checkout success rate. Wade said that he felt "disgusted" with himself at certain points of the contest and believed it was "God's gift" rather than his own ability that secured him the victory. Fifth seed Jonny Clayton began his match with fourth seed Stephen Bunting by going 5–0 in front while averaging 110 for the session, including a 160 checkout in the third leg. They traded legs in the second session to bring the score to 10–5. Bunting reduced the deficit to 11–7 but failed to add onto his total, as Clayton landed 118, 108 and back-to-back 76 finishes on his way to defeating Bunting 16–7. Clayton pinned half of his attempts at double over the course of the match. He admitted that he "didn't expect to be 5–0 ahead" but said that he was "so pleased to get over that finish line".

In the third quarter-final match, number two seed Luke Littler faced Andrew Gilding, who previously defeated Littler at the 2024 European Championship. The contest began with seven consecutive holds of throw, but Littler soon established a three-leg buffer. He edged closer to victory by extending his lead to 12–8 and 14–9. However, Gilding found his way back into the match with checkouts of 124, 72 on the bullseye, and 160 to reduce the deficit to 14–12. One leg away from a potential tiebreaker at 15–14, Littler won the next leg in 11 darts to claim a 16–14 victory. Littler hit eighteen 180s during the match, breaking the record for most maximums in a World Matchplay quarter-final. He described getting the win as a "professional job", also saying: "I really didn’t want to go to a tie-break, so to hit an 11-darter with back-to-back 180s was class." Josh Rock and Gerwyn Price traded breaks of throw in the opening two legs of their match, with Rock taking the third through a 120 finish. Price bounced back to take a 4–3 lead, but Rock won the next three legs – including a 10-dart finish – to go ahead 6–4. Price achieved the first 170 checkout of the tournament and found himself 7–6 in front. Level at 8–8, Rock won three legs in a row to distance himself from his Welsh opponent, later extending his lead to 13–9. Price took the next two legs but was unable to take control, as Rock landed a 164 checkout to win the match 16–11. Both players finished the contest with averages over 100. Rock remarked that he was "on cloud nine" following the victory and recounted what he told himself during proceedings: "I was just like, 'Josh, you're doing nothing wrong, you're playing your own game, happy days'."

=== Semi-finals ===
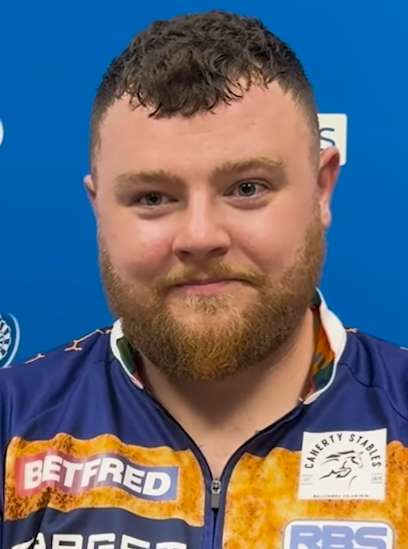
Josh Rock (pictured) and Luke Littler hit a combined 29 scores of 180 in their semi-final, setting the record for the most maximums in a World Matchplay match.

The semi-finals (best of 33 legs) were played on 26 July. Jonny Clayton featured in his second World Matchplay semi-final in three years, first reaching the last four of the event in 2023 when he lost in the final to Nathan Aspinall. He faced James Wade, who contested his 10th semi-final. Luke Littler and Josh Rock, good friends and two former World Youth champions, entered the tournament without a win at the event, thus making their first semi-final appearances. Rock was also the only unseeded player to reach the penultimate round. Sky Sports pundit and former world champion John Part previewed the latter match, stating that Rock "knows when he plays Luke, he can live with Luke". All four players also comprised the semi-final lineup at the UK Open earlier in the year, where Littler defeated Wade in the final.

Wade landed a 161 checkout to take a 3–1 lead against Clayton but the Welshman found a break of throw in the final leg of the session. Wade extended his advantage to 7–3 before Clayton made a 161 checkout of his own in the 12th leg. Wade went one leg away from victory at 16–10 but Clayton fought back by winning the next six to tie the match at 16–16, forcing a tiebreaker. Wade responded to his opponent's surge by pinning his second 161 checkout of the match. Clayton was able to level the match at 17–17 and 18–18, but costly misses at double 16 allowed Wade to hit double 9 to triumph 20–18. The 38-leg affair became the longest semi-final match in the event's history. Wade described himself as "flabbergasted" and "exhausted" after the lengthy contest, admitting that he "hated every single minute of it".

Littler got off to a slow start in his match against Rock, with the Northern Irishman going 5–0 ahead to open the second semi-final. In the eighth leg, Littler and Rock both hit back-to-back 180s, leaving them both on 141 for a nine-dart finish. Throwing first, Littler took out the 141 checkout on double 15 to complete the nine-darter, denying Rock the chance to attempt the same feat. It was the tenth nine-dart finish in the event's history. Commentator Wayne Mardle referred to the leg, which featured 15 'perfect darts', as "the second-best leg you will ever see in your life", hearkening back to the nine-dart finish achieved by Michael Smith in the 2023 World Championship final which he hit after Michael van Gerwen missed double 12 for his own. From 9–6 behind, Littler staged a comeback by winning the next five legs to take an 11–9 lead. Rock landed checkouts of 170 and 120 as he closed the gap to 14–12 but was unable to catch Littler, who went on to win 17–14. A combined 29 scores of 180 – 15 from Littler and 14 from Rock – set a new record for the most maximums hit in a World Matchplay match. Littler called the match an "incredible game" and believed that the nine-darter in the eighth leg "sparked [him] into life". Discussing the final against Wade, he commented: "I've won many majors, but this is the big one now."

=== Final ===
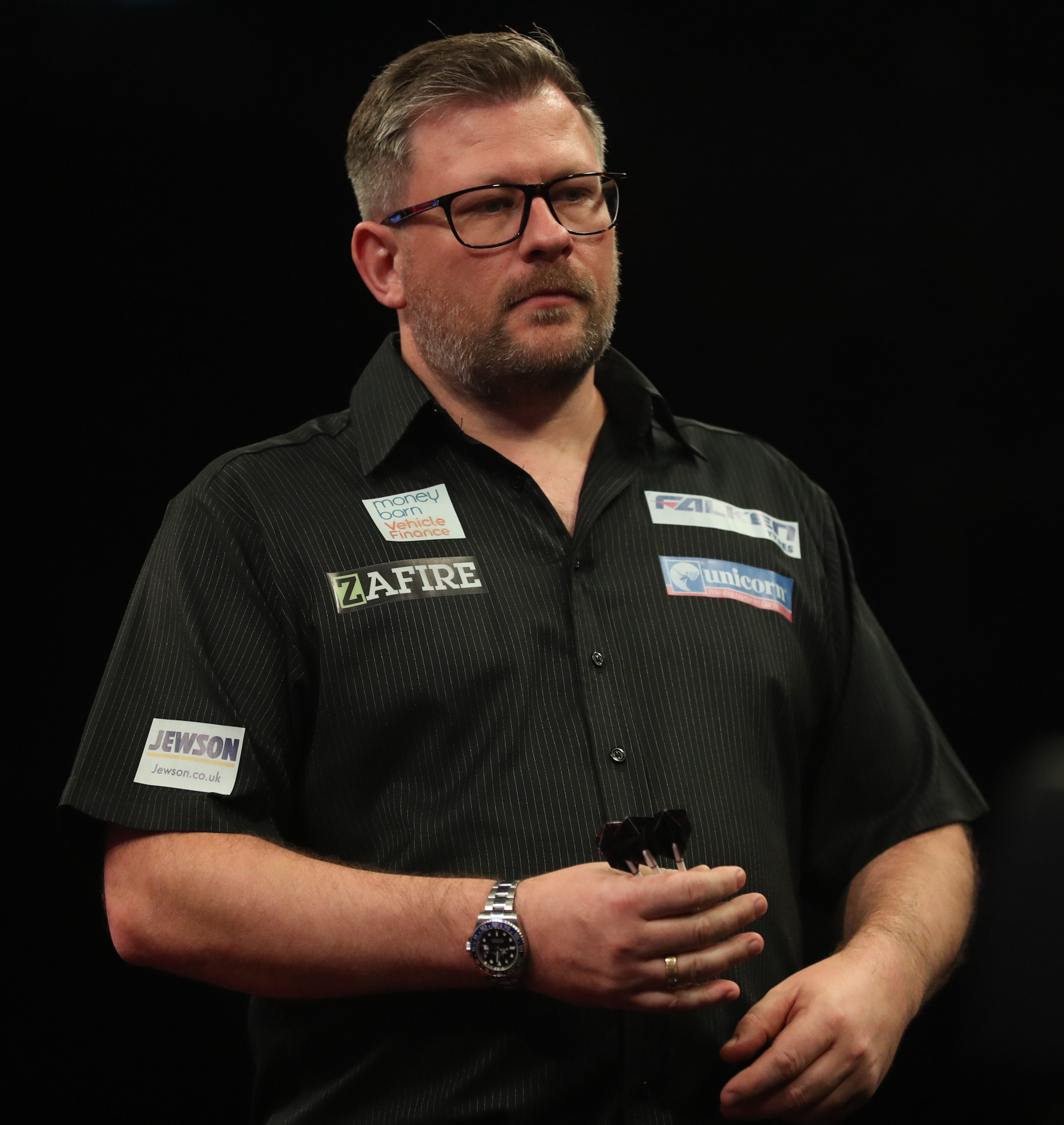
James Wade (pictured in 2022) contested his seventh World Matchplay final.

The final (best of 35 legs) between compatriots James Wade and Luke Littler was played on 27 July. It was a repeat of the 2025 UK Open final, where Littler defeated Wade 11–2. Wade was featuring in his seventh World Matchplay final, having won the event in 2007 and finishing as runner-up in 2006, 2008, 2011, 2012 and 2015. His 18-year-old opponent Littler, who was appearing in his first final, was born six months after Wade reached his first final at the 2006 event, and was only six months old when Wade won the event in 2007. Littler was aiming to complete the so-called PDC Triple Crown, referring to winning the World Championship, World Matchplay and Premier League – a feat that had only been achieved by Phil Taylor, Michael van Gerwen, Gary Anderson and Luke Humphries. Wade was seeking his first televised ranking title since winning the 2021 UK Open.

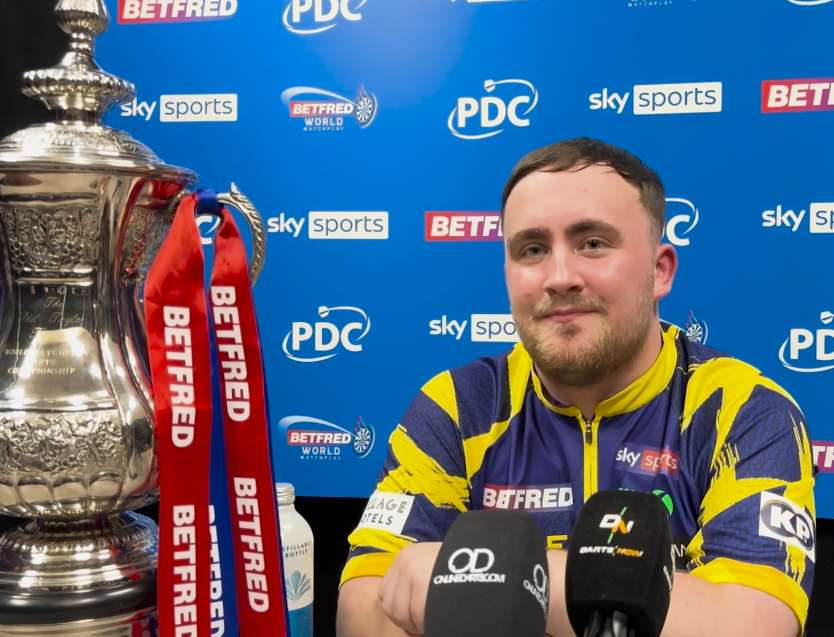
Luke Littler (pictured) with the Phil Taylor Trophy

Similar to his semi-final match against Josh Rock, Littler found himself 5–0 down in the first session, with Wade's clinical finishing proving decisive early on. Littler got on the scoresheet and won the next session 5–0 to level the match at 5–5, winning all five legs in 15 darts or less without allowing his opponent a shot at double. He took the lead for the first time at 7–6 before edging ahead again by converting a 97 checkout for 8–7. Littler stayed in front and threatened a second nine-dart finish of the tournament in the 22nd leg, but was unable to hit eighth perfect dart needed. He established a three-leg lead for the first time at 13–10, but Wade would eventually cut the gap to 14–13 through a 101 checkout. However, Wade failed to register another leg as Littler won four consecutive legs, landing a 115 checkout on double 19 – the highest finish of the match – to secure an 18–13 victory. Littler posted a three-dart average of 107.24 and hit 17 maximums.

Littler won the World Matchplay title for the first time and became the youngest winner of the tournament, breaking Wade's record from when he won it at age 24 in 2007. He joined Taylor, Van Gerwen, Anderson and Humphries as the fifth player to complete the PDC Triple Crown, having previously won the 2024 Premier League and the 2025 World Championship. He also broke the record for the most maximums hit by an individual player during a World Matchplay campaign, ending the tournament with 64 which overtook Adrian Lewis's previous best of 56. The win saw him go above the £1.5 million mark on the PDC Order of Merit, while also taking his total amount of prize money won since turning professional to over £2 million. Wade's run to the final saw him re-enter the top five of the Order of Merit. Speaking after the win, Littler acknowledged his idol Phil Taylor's sixteen title wins at the event and took pride in his name being added to the list of champions. He joked that he "definitely put [his] family and friends through it" after producing multiple comeback victories, before stating that winning the tournament "definitely rights the wrongs from losing in the first round last year".

== Schedule ==
The event was held over nine days from 19 July to the date of the final on Sunday, 27 July. The figures to the right of a player's name state their three-dart average in a match. Players in bold denote match winners.

Saturday, 19 July

Match #	Round	Player 1	Score	Player 2	Break 1	Break 2
01	1	**James Wade** 104.44	**10** – 3	Joe Cullen 95.76	4 – 1	8 – 2
02	1	**Danny Noppert** 96.44	**10** – 2	Cameron Menzies 81.35	5 – 0	8 – 2
03	1	Luke Humphries 95.69	8 – **10**	**Gian van Veen** 98.45	3 – 2	5 – 5
04	1	Nathan Aspinall 98.88	6 – **10**	**Wessel Nijman** 101.72	1 – 4	4 – 6

Sunday, 20 July

Match #	Round	Player 1	Score	Player 2	Break 1	Break 2
05	1	Damon Heta 100.03	10 – **12**	**Andrew Gilding** 101.82	4 – 1	6 – 4
06	1	Rob Cross 96.10	8 – **10**	**Dirk van Duijvenbode** 95.33	3 – 2	6 – 4
07	1	Peter Wright 93.10	8 – **10**	**Jermaine Wattimena** 91.81	1 – 4	3 – 7
08	1	Dave Chisnall 91.87	7 – **10**	**Mike De Decker** 93.01	2 – 3	5 – 5
09	1	**Gary Anderson** 98.02	**10** – 5	Luke Woodhouse 94.11	3 – 2	5 – 5
10	1	**Jonny Clayton** 99.60	**10** – 7	Martin Schindler 103.45	4 – 1	6 – 4
11	1	**Luke Littler** 108.92	**10** – 2	Ryan Searle 98.63	5 – 0	8 – 2
12	1	**Stephen Bunting** 98.00	**10** – 8	Ryan Joyce 93.71	3 – 2	6 – 4

Monday, 21 July

Match #	Round	Player 1	Score	Player 2	Break 1	Break 2
13	1	**Chris Dobey** 90.95	**10** – 5	Ricardo Pietreczko 83.22	2 – 3	6 – 4
14	1	**Gerwyn Price** 100.21	**10** – 7	Daryl Gurney 98.46	4 – 1	6 – 4
15	1	**Michael van Gerwen** 91.84	**10** – 6	Raymond van Barneveld 87.10	3 – 2	6 – 4
16	1	Ross Smith 94.88	5 – **10**	**Josh Rock** 104.32	0 – 5	3 – 7

Tuesday, 22 July

Match #	Round	Player 1	Score	Player 2	Break 1	Break 2
17	2	**Gian van Veen** 94.94	**11** – 5	Danny Noppert 94.59	3 – 2	7 – 3
18	2	Wessel Nijman 94.78	5 – **11**	**James Wade** 102.53	2 – 3	4 – 6
19	2	**Stephen Bunting** 92.71	**12** – 10	Gary Anderson 91.70	2 – 3	4 – 6
20	2	**Jonny Clayton** 93.41	**11** – 8	Mike De Decker 92.62	3 – 2	6 – 4

Wednesday, 23 July

Match #	Round	Player 1	Score	Player 2	Break 1	Break 2
21	2	**Andrew Gilding** 100.50	**11** – 5	Dirk van Duijvenbode 93.78	5 – 0	7 – 3
22	2	Chris Dobey 96.50	3 – **11**	**Gerwyn Price** 108.73	1 – 4	2 – 8
23	2	**Luke Littler** 99.28	**13** – 11	Jermaine Wattimena 96.39	1 – 4	3 – 7
24	2	Michael van Gerwen 97.31	11 – **13**	**Josh Rock** 95.16	4 – 1	6 – 4

Thursday, 24 July

Match #	Round	Player 1	Score	Player 2	Break 1	Break 2	Break 3	Break 4
25	QF	Gian van Veen 99.24	13 – **16**	**James Wade** 96.35	4 – 1	4 – 6	5 – 10	8 – 12
26	QF	Stephen Bunting 94.97	7 – **16**	**Jonny Clayton** 98.13	0 – 5	3 – 7	5 – 10	7 – 13

Friday, 25 July

Match #	Round	Player 1	Score	Player 2	Break 1	Break 2	Break 3	Break 4
27	QF	**Luke Littler** 103.91	**16** – 14	Andrew Gilding 98.45	3 – 2	6 – 4	9 – 6	12 – 8
28	QF	**Josh Rock** 104.02	**16** – 11	Gerwyn Price 100.21	3 – 2	6 – 4	8 – 7	11 – 9

Saturday, 26 July

Match #	Round	Player 1	Score	Player 2	Break 1	Break 2	Break 3	Break 4
29	SF	**James Wade** 101.79	**20** – 18	Jonny Clayton 100.97	3 – 2	7 – 3	10 – 5	12 – 8
30	SF	**Luke Littler** 107.50	**17** – 14	Josh Rock 104.15	0 – 5	3 – 7	6 – 9	11 – 9

Sunday, 27 July

Match #	Round	Player 1	Score	Player 2	Break 1	Break 2	Break 3	Break 4	Break 5
31	F	James Wade 101.54	13 – **18**	**Luke Littler** 107.24	5 – 0	5 – 5	7 – 8	9 – 11	11 – 14

== Draw ==
The draw was announced on 10 July, conducted by Russ Bray. Numbers to the left of players' names show the seedings for the top 16 in the tournament.

First round (best of 19 legs); 19–21 July
1	Luke Humphries 95.69	8
Gian van Veen 98.45	10
16	Danny Noppert 96.44	10
Cameron Menzies 81.35	2
8	Nathan Aspinall 98.88	6
Wessel Nijman 101.72	10
9	James Wade 104.44	10
Joe Cullen 95.76	3
4	Stephen Bunting 98.00	10
Ryan Joyce 93.71	8
13	Gary Anderson 98.02	10
Luke Woodhouse 94.11	5
5	Jonny Clayton 99.60	10
Martin Schindler 103.45	7
12	Dave Chisnall 91.87	7
Mike De Decker 93.01	10
2	Luke Littler 108.92	10
Ryan Searle 98.63	2
15	Peter Wright 93.10	8
Jermaine Wattimena 91.81	10
7	Damon Heta 100.03	10
Andrew Gilding 101.82	12
10	Rob Cross 96.10	8
Dirk van Duijvenbode 95.33	10
3	Michael van Gerwen 91.84	10
Raymond van Barneveld 87.10	6
14	Ross Smith 94.88	5
Josh Rock 104.32	10
6	Chris Dobey 90.95	10
Ricardo Pietreczko 83.22	5
11	Gerwyn Price 100.21	10
Daryl Gurney 98.46	7

Second round (best of 21 legs); 22–23 July
Gian van Veen 94.94	11
16	Danny Noppert 94.59	5
Wessel Nijman 94.78	5
9	James Wade 102.53	11
4	Stephen Bunting 92.71	12
13	Gary Anderson 91.70	10
5	Jonny Clayton 93.41	11
Mike De Decker 92.62	8
2	Luke Littler 99.28	13
Jermaine Wattimena 96.39	11
Andrew Gilding 100.50	11
Dirk van Duijvenbode 93.78	5
3	Michael van Gerwen 97.31	11
Josh Rock 95.16	13
6	Chris Dobey 96.50	3
11	Gerwyn Price 108.73	11

Quarter-finals (best of 31 legs); 24–25 July
Gian van Veen 99.24	13
9	James Wade 96.35	16
4	Stephen Bunting 94.97	7
5	Jonny Clayton 98.13	16
2	Luke Littler 103.91	16
Andrew Gilding 98.45	14
Josh Rock 104.02	16
11	Gerwyn Price 100.21	11

Semi-finals (best of 33 legs); 26 July
9	James Wade 101.79	20
5	Jonny Clayton 100.97	18
2	Luke Littler 107.50	17
Josh Rock 104.15	14

Final (best of 35 legs); 27 July
9	James Wade 101.54	13
2	Luke Littler 107.24	18

== Top averages ==
The table lists all players who achieved an average of at least 100 in a match. In the case one player has multiple records, this is indicated by the number in brackets.

#	Player	Round	Average	Result
1	Luke Littler	First round	108.92	Won
2	Gerwyn Price	Second round	108.73	Won
3	Luke Littler (2)	Semi-finals	107.50	Won
4	Luke Littler (3)	Final	107.24	Won
5	James Wade	First round	104.44	Won
6	Josh Rock	First round	104.32	Won
7	Josh Rock (2)	Semi-finals	104.15	Lost
8	Josh Rock (3)	Quarter-finals	104.02	Won
9	Luke Littler (4)	Quarter-finals	103.91	Won
10	Martin Schindler	First round	103.45	Lost
11	James Wade (2)	Second round	102.53	Won
12	Andrew Gilding	First round	101.82	Won
13	James Wade (3)	Semi-finals	101.79	Won
14	Wessel Nijman	First round	101.72	Won
15	James Wade (4)	Final	101.54	Lost
16	Jonny Clayton	Semi-finals	100.97	Lost
17	Andrew Gilding (2)	Second round	100.50	Won
18	Gerwyn Price (2)	First round	100.21	Won
19	Gerwyn Price (3)	Quarter-finals	100.21	Lost
20	Damon Heta	First round	100.03	Lost
