= Łukasz Wacławski =

Polish darts player (born 1980)

Personal information
- Full name: Łukasz Wacławski
- Nickname: "The Hound"
- Born: 2 May 1980 (age 46) Brodnica, Poland
- Home town: Warsaw, Poland

Sport
- Sport: Darts
- Playing since: 2000
- Darts: 23g Cosmo
- Laterality: Right-handed
- Walk-on music: "The Hound Dog" by Elvis Presley

Organisation (see split in darts)
- BDO: 2018–2020
- PDC: 2019, 2023–
- WDF: 2018–2022

WDF major events – best performances
- World Masters: Last 256: 2018, 2019

Other tournament wins
- Years
Kiev Masters	2018
Ukraine Open	2018
Polish Super League	2017
Liga Dart Polska	2023

Łukasz Wacławski (born 2 May 1980) is a Polish entrepreneur, dog trainer and professional darts player who plays in World Darts Federation (WDF) and Professional Darts Corporation (PDC) events. He is a Kiev Masters and Ukraine Open champion.

== Career ==
Wacławski began his career in the early 2000s. For many years he has been representing the local sports club Rekiny Warszawskie, playing together with Krzysztof Ratajski. After winning the finals of the Polish Super League in 2017, he took part in several international World Darts Federation tournaments in the following season. In May 2018, he advanced to the final of the Vilnius Open, where he lost to Ben Hazel by 1–6 in legs. Three months later, he won two international tournaments held in Kiev. In the Kiev Masters, he beat Oleksii Bushui by 5–1 in legs. In the Ukraine Open, he beat Andrey Pontus by 5–3 in legs.

Thanks to his victory in both tournaments, he was invited to participate in the 2018 Winmau World Masters. However, his competition in the tournament ended very quickly, because he lost to Marty Moreland by 2–3 in sets. A year later, he competed again in the 2019 World Masters and this time he was also eliminated in the first round. He lost to Andrew Kateley by 2–3 in sets.

At his first PDC Challenge Tour tournament in 2019, he reached the Last 32 phase, however he only played the opening weekend, four events. In 2019, he once again took part in tournaments held in Ukraine. In the Ukraine Open and Kyiv Masters, he ended his participation in the quarter-finals.

In July 2023, a few days after winning the national tournament of one of the private national initiatives, Wacławski took part in the qualifying tournament for the 2023 Poland Darts Masters and won it by defeating Krzysztof Chmielewski in the final match by 6–4 in legs. This was the second time he participated in a Professional Darts Corporation tournament. In the first round match, he faced third seed Gerwyn Price. Wacławski showed himself very well in front of the Polish audience, winning three legs. He ultimately lost the match by 3–6 in legs.

== Personal life ==
Wacławski runs the innovative training program Smart Darts Training and he help beginning players with create a real training plan. In addition, he is engaged in dog training.

== Performance timeline ==
Tournament	2018	2019
WDF Ranked televised events
World Masters	1R	1R
