= 2023 Hungarian Darts Trophy =

2023 edition of Hungarian Darts Trophy

Tournament information
- Dates: 22–24 September 2023
- Venue: MVM Dome
- Location: Budapest, Hungary
- Organisation(s): Professional Darts Corporation (PDC)
- Format: Legs
- Prize fund: £175,000
- Winner's share: £30,000
- Nine-dart finish: Luke Humphries
- High checkout: 170 Luke Humphries (x2)

Champion(s)
- Dave Chisnall

The 2023 Hungarian Darts Trophy was the twelfth of thirteen PDC European Tour events on the 2023 PDC Pro Tour. The tournament will take place at the MVM Dome, Budapest, Hungary from 22–24 September 2023. It will feature a field of 48 players and £175,000 in prize money, with £30,000 going to the winner.

The defending champion was Joe Cullen, who defeated William O'Connor 8–2 in the 2022 final. Cullen lost to Gerwyn Price 6–4 in the third round.

Dave Chisnall won the Hungarian Darts Trophy and secured his third European Tour win of the season after a 8–7 win against Luke Humphries, who produced a nine-dart finish in the final in Budapest.

== Prize money ==
The prize money was increased for the first time in 4 years for all European Tours:

Stage (num. of players)		Prize money
Winner	(1)	£30,000
Runner-up	(1)	£12,000
Semi-finalists	(2)	£8,000
Quarter-finalists	(4)	£6,000
Third round losers	(8)	£4,000
Second round losers	(16)	£2,500*
First round losers	(16)	£1,250
Total	£175,000	

- Seeded players who lose in the second round of the event shall not be credited with prize money on any Order of Merit. A player who qualifies as a qualifier, but later becomes a seed due to the withdrawal of one or more other players shall be credited with their prize money on all Orders of Merit regardless of how far they progress in the event.

== Qualification and format ==
The top 16 entrants from the PDC ProTour Order of Merit on 15 August 2023 automatically qualified for the event and were seeded in the second round.

The remaining 32 places went to players from six qualifying events – 24 from the Tour Card Holder Qualifier (held on 28 August), two from the Associate Member Qualifier (held on 21 May), the top-seeded Hungarian automatically qualified, alongside three from the Host Nation Qualifier (held on 5 August), one from the Nordic & Baltic Associate Member Qualifier (held on 14 June), and one from the East European Associate Member Qualifier (held on 4 June).

The following players took part in the tournament:

Top 16

1. Dave Chisnall (champion)
2. Damon Heta (quarter-finals)
3. Luke Humphries (runner-up)
4. Dirk van Duijvenbode (second round)
5. Josh Rock (second round)
6. Rob Cross (second round)
7. Gerwyn Price (semi-finals)
8. Jonny Clayton (third round)
9. Michael van Gerwen (quarter-finals)
10. Joe Cullen (third round)
11. Peter Wright (third round)
12. Michael Smith (third round)
13. Danny Noppert (third round)
14. Martin Schindler (third round)
15. Nathan Aspinall (second round)
16. Ryan Searle (second round)

Tour Card Qualifier
- Ross Smith (second round)
- Brendan Dolan (first round)
- José de Sousa (second round)
- Nathan Rafferty (second round)
- Andrew Gilding (first round)
- William O'Connor (first round)
- Joe Murnan (first round)
- Jermaine Wattimena (second round)
- James Wade (second round)
- Luke Woodhouse (quarter-finals)
- Scott Williams (semi-finals)
- Ricardo Pietreczko (first round)
- Stephen Bunting (first round)
- Robert Owen (first round)
- Gabriel Clemens (first round)
- Gian van Veen (third round)
- Daryl Gurney (first round)
- Rowby-John Rodriguez (third round)
- Scott Waites (second round)
- Richard Veenstra (first round)
- Vladimir Andersen (first round)
- Madars Razma (first round)
- Mike De Decker (quarter-finals)
- Keane Barry (second round)

Associate Member Qualifier
- Andy Boulton (first round)
- Scott Mitchell (second round)

Highest Ranking Hungarian
- Patrik Kovács (first round)

Host Nation Qualifier
- Gábor Jagicza (first round)
- Mihály Vida (first round)
- Nándor Major (second round)

Nordic & Baltic Qualifier
- Anton Östlund (second round)

East European Qualifier
- Sebastian Białecki (second round)

== Draw ==
First round (best of 11 legs); 22 September
Andy Boulton 90.12	5
Scott Mitchell 87.23	6
Rowby-John Rodriguez 87.06	6
Patrik Kovács 83.89	5
Joe Murnan 82.11	4
Jermaine Wattimena 86.26	6
Robert Owen 87.39	2
Ross Smith 100.86	6
Scott Williams 91.33	6
Richard Veenstra 91.17	3
Vladimir Andersen 77.61	2
Anton Östlund 97.18	6
Mike De Decker 92.03	6
Andrew Gilding 87.74	4
Daryl Gurney 85.22	5
José de Sousa 94.61	6
Ricardo Pietreczko 82.05	4
Nándor Major 82.14	6
Gian van Veen 90.77	6
Brendan Dolan 86.35	2
Nathan Rafferty 99.06	6
Stephen Bunting 94.48	4
William O'Connor 85.28	3
James Wade 85.52	6
Gabriel Clemens 96.69	3
Keane Barry 98.32	6
Sebastian Białecki 85.07	6
Mihály Vida 80.79	1
Gábor Jagicza 77.92	3
Luke Woodhouse 84.72	6
Madars Razma 90.84	4
Scott Waites 88.16	6

Second round (best of 11 legs); 23 September
1	Dave Chisnall 96.63	6
Scott Mitchell 90.25	2
16	Ryan Searle 94.14	4
Rowby-John Rodriguez 91.11	6
8	Jonny Clayton 92.89	6
Jermaine Wattimena 87.37	5
9	Michael van Gerwen 98.86	6
Ross Smith 98.01	4
4	Dirk van Duijvenbode 96.74	3
Scott Williams 92.12	6
13	Danny Noppert 97.63	6
Anton Östlund 86.57	5
5	Josh Rock 90.85	1
Mike De Decker 94.73	6
12	Michael Smith 89.41	6
José de Sousa 87.11	4
2	Damon Heta 96.97	6
Nándor Major 80.40	0
15	Nathan Aspinall 101.72	1
Gian van Veen 99.56	6
7	Gerwyn Price 106.09	6
Nathan Rafferty 98.19	0
10	Joe Cullen 87.49	6
James Wade 88.96	4
3	Luke Humphries 108.56	6
Keane Barry 95.19	2
14	Martin Schindler 100.17	6
Sebastian Białecki 83.00	1
6	Rob Cross 89.64	3
Luke Woodhouse 97.52	6
11	Peter Wright 94.25	6
Scott Waites 96.02	3

Third round (best of 11 legs); 24 September
1	Chisnall 98.10	6
Rodriguez 83.05	1
8	Clayton 100.64	5
9	van Gerwen 103.89	6
Williams 89.77	6
13	Noppert 91.41	5
De Decker 98.73	6
12	Smith 92.49	2
2	Heta 85.31	6
Van Veen 86.57	4
7	Price 99.40	6
10	Cullen 90.93	4
3	Humphries 106.17	6
14	Schindler 92.53	1
Woodhouse 100.31	6
11	Wright 95.64	2

Quarter-finals (best of 11 legs); 24 September
1	Chisnall 95.48	6
9	van Gerwen 101.43	4
Williams 86.31	6
De Decker 83.70	5
2	Heta 88.96	5
7	Price 91.48	6
3	Humphries 100.20	6
Woodhouse 87.93	0

Semi-finals (best of 13 legs); 24 September
1	Chisnall 100.41	7
Williams 93.30	5
7	Price 95.12	4
3	Humphries 103.10	7

Final (best of 15 legs); 24 September
1	Chisnall 104.82	8
3	Humphries 100.97	7
