= 2023 Poland Darts Masters =

2023 Superbet Poland Darts Masters

Tournament information
- Dates: 7–8 July 2023
- Venue: Arena COS Torwar
- Location: Warsaw
- Country: Poland
- Organisation(s): PDC
- Format: Legs
- Prize fund: £60,000
- Winner's share: £20,000
- High checkout: 156 Gerwyn Price

Champion(s)
- Michael van Gerwen

The 2023 Superbet Poland Darts Masters was the first Professional Darts Corporation tournament organised in Poland, and the fourth entry in the 2023 World Series of Darts. The tournament featured 16 players (eight top-ranking players and eight regional qualifiers) and was held at the Arena COS Torwar in Warsaw, Poland on 7–8 July 2023. The event was announced on 23 March 2023, and betting company Superbet were announced as the sponsors on 29 June.

Michael van Gerwen became the inaugural champion after defeating Dimitri Van den Bergh 8–3 in the final. The final average of Michael van Gerwen (113.22) was his highest average during a television tournament since 2017.

== Prize money ==
Position (no. of players)		Prize money (Total: £60,000)
Winner	(1)	£20,000
Runner-up	(1)	£10,000
Semi-finalists	(2)	£5,000
Quarter-finalists	(4)	£2,500
First round	(8)	£1,250

== Qualifiers ==
The PDC announced 8 players who would be their elite representatives at the event, which included World Champion Michael Smith, alongside reigning World Series of Darts Finals winner Gerwyn Price and three-time World Champion Michael van Gerwen. They were joined by Rob Cross, Luke Humphries, Danny Noppert, Dimitri Van den Bergh and Nathan Aspinall.

- Michael Smith
- Michael van Gerwen
- Gerwyn Price
- Rob Cross
- Luke Humphries
- Danny Noppert
- Dimitri Van den Bergh
- Nathan Aspinall

Regional qualifiers from Poland were Tour card holders Krzysztof Ratajski, Krzysztof Kciuk and Radek Szagański. They were joined by Boris Krčmar from Croatia, Adam Gawlas and Karel Sedláček from the Czech Republic. The remaining two spots were allocated to the winners of qualifiers in Poland and Hungary. The Hungarian Qualifier tournament took place on 4 June and was won by Nándor Major. The Polish Qualifier event was played on 1 July in Tarnowo Podgórne, during the weekend of the Polish Darts Organisation's National Championship. The final qualifying match was won by Łukasz Wacławski who defeated Krzysztof Chmielewski 6–4.

Qualification	Player
PDC Tour Card Holders	Krzysztof Ratajski
PDC Tour Card Holders	Krzysztof Kciuk
PDC Tour Card Holders	Radek Szagański
PDC Tour Card Holders	Adam Gawlas
PDC Tour Card Holders	Karel Sedláček
PDC Tour Card Holders	Boris Krčmar
Hungarian Qualifier	Nándor Major
Polish Qualifier	Łukasz Wacławski

== Draw ==
First round (best of 11 legs); 7 July
1	Gerwyn Price 91.31	6
Łukasz Wacławski 83.03	3
Nathan Aspinall 105.87	6
Boris Krčmar 100.18	2
4	Rob Cross 88.43	3
Krzysztof Ratajski 93.64	6
Dimitri Van den Bergh 105.31	6
Karel Sedláček 98.40	4
2	Michael Smith 86.33	6
Krzysztof Kciuk 81.34	1
Danny Noppert 87.26	6
Radek Szagański 81.98	2
3	Michael van Gerwen 98.48	6
Adam Gawlas 90.77	3
Luke Humphries 86.71	6
Nándor Major 79.76	0

Quarter-finals (best of 11 legs); 8 July
1	Gerwyn Price 99.43	6
Nathan Aspinall 94.45	3
Krzysztof Ratajski 99.09	3
Dimitri Van den Bergh 97.39	6
2	Michael Smith 97.43	6
Danny Noppert 103.36	4
3	Michael van Gerwen 110.79	6
Luke Humphries 104.97	2

Semi-finals (best of 13 legs); 8 July
1	Gerwyn Price 92.51	6
Dimitri Van den Bergh 97.84	7
2	Michael Smith 98.01	3
3	Michael van Gerwen 104.02	7

Final (best of 15 legs); 8 July
Dimitri Van den Bergh 101.07	3
3	Michael van Gerwen 113.22	8
