= Nándor Major =

Hungarian darts player

Personal information
- Born: 28 July 1990 (age 36) Kaposvár, Hungary
- Home town: Budapest, Hungary

Sport
- Sport: Darts
- Playing since: 2020
- Darts: 23g Winmau
- Laterality: Right-handed
- Walk-on music: "Smells Like Teen Spirit" by Nirvana

Organisation (see split in darts)
- PDC: 2020–present
- WDF: 2021–present
- Current world ranking: (PDC) 150 ▼1 (18 October 2026)

WDF major events – best performances
- World Masters: Last 64: 2022, 2025

Nándor Major (born 28 July 1990) is a Hungarian darts player who competes in the World Darts Federation (WDF), Professional Darts Corporation (PDC) and other national events.

== Career ==
Major began his career competing in local tournaments. Major competed in the PDC's Qualifying School in 2020, and this has been his international debut. In 2021, he made his debut in World Darts Federation tournaments during Budapest Masters. He advanced in this tournament to the quarter-finals, where he lost to József Rucska by 0–6 in legs. At the Budapest Classic in 2022, he advanced to the semi-finals, losing to Gábor Jagicza. He also achieved good results at the Balaton Darts Masters and Hungarian Masters.

In December, he traveled abroad for the first time to the Netherlands for the 2022 World Masters. He achieved a good result in the group stage. In the second round, he defeated Patrick Peters by 5–2 in legs. In the third round match, he lost to Chris Landman by 3–5 in legs. In 2023, he won the Hungarian Qualifier tournament for the 2023 Poland Darts Masters. He went on to become the first Hungarian player to win a game at a PDC European Tour event, defeating Ricardo Pietreczko 6–4 at the 2023 Hungarian Darts Trophy.

== Performance timeline ==
Tournament	2022	2023	2024	2025
WDF Ranked televised events
World Masters	3R	NH	RR	3R
PDC Non-ranked televised events
World Cup	DNP		RR	DNP
