= Vítězslav Sedlák =

Czech darts player

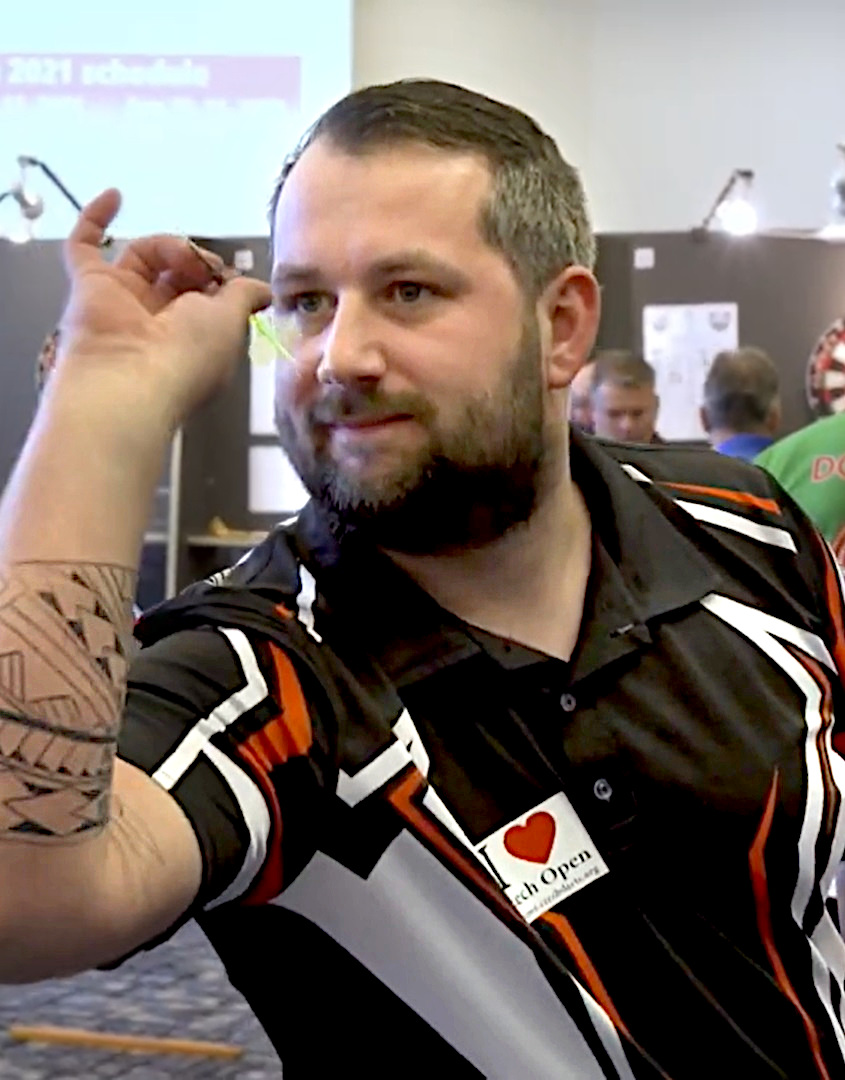
- Vítězslav Sedlák - Czech Open Darts 2021

Personal information
- Born: 5 February 1991 (age 35) Czech Republic
- Home town: Uničov, Czech Republic

Sport
- Sport: Darts
- Playing since: 2009
- Laterality: Right-handed

Organisation (see split in darts)
- PDC: 2020–present

WDF major events – best performances
- World Masters: Last 16: 2022

Other tournament wins
- Years
EDU European Ch'ship	2019
Czech Cup	2020
Tipsport Premier League	2020, 2021
PDC Challenge Tour	2023
Medal record
Men's Darts
Representing Czech Republic
WDF Europe Cup
Silver medal – second place	2024 Šamorín	Men's team
Bronze medal – third place	2022 Gandía	Men's pairs

Vítězslav Sedlák (born 5 February 1991) is a Czech darts player and a member of the team Mustang Knínice.

== Career ==
Vítězslav started playing darts at the age of 18, before that he played table football in which he became National Junior Champion. He started to play darts in local pub leagues, soon after he participated in official league events.

In soft-tip darts he managed to win twice in TOP tournament of National Grand Prix and twice on Grand Prix itself. In 2019 he represented Czech Republic in European championship and won the title.

In steel darts, his biggest achievement so far is a victory in Czech Cup in 2020.

In early 2020, he took part in PDC European Q-School, he was eliminated in the last 256 three times and once in the last 64. That was in Day 4 and he lost 3–5 to the BDO world number one, Dutchman Richard Veenstra. In April 2020 he became one of the ten players of newly found 2020 Tipsport Premier League as a replacement for Tomáš Houdek. Sedlák was among top 4 players during the round robin stage and secured his playoff spot. In the semifinal he won against Daniel Barborak 10–4 and advanced to the final. In the final he defeated Alexander Mašek 10–6 and became the first winner of Tipsport Premier League.

In 2021 he played in the second year of Tipsport Premier League and was defending the title. After round robin he was in 2nd place with 12 wins and 4 losses and secured his spot in playoff. In the semi-final he faced Daniel Barborak for the second time in a row and won 10–5. In the final he played against the overall winner of the round robin, Jan Hlavacek, and won 10–8, successfully defending the title. Later on in the year he became Czech National Champion in singles, pairs and mixed pairs.

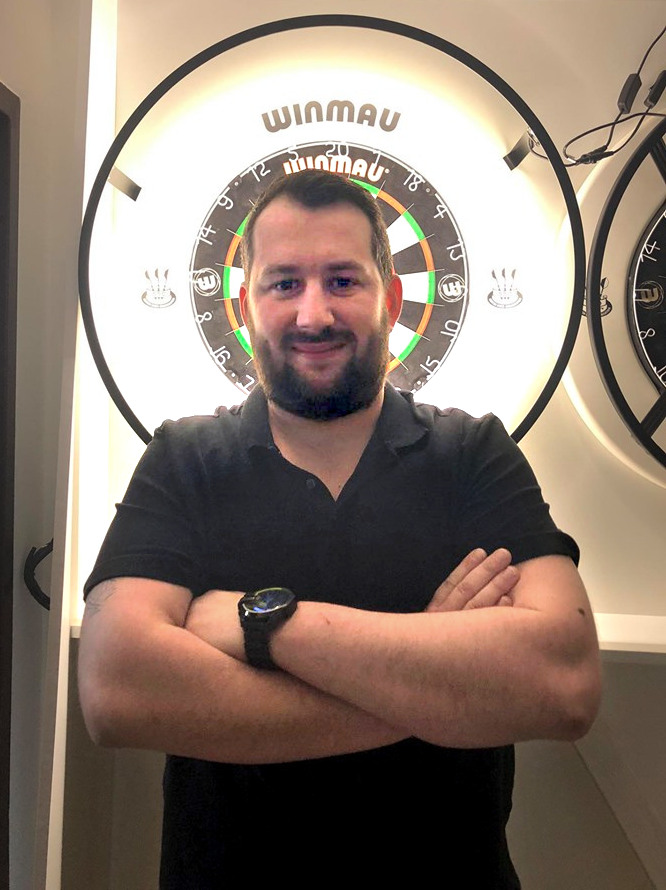
Sedlák in 2020

In 2022 he qualified through Host Nation Qualifier for 2022 Czech Darts Open. In his first PDC ranking event match he won against Jonathan Worsley. In the second round he lost to Michael van Gerwen 2–6. In Autumn 2022 he was runner-up of the WDF tournament in Spain, where he missed two match darts for the title. Along with Adam Gawlas he became WDF Czech Open Champion in pairs.

At the beginning of 2023 Sedlák took part in 2023 PDC European Q-School, where he advanced to the Final Stage but was not able to secure a Tour Card. He continued on the PDC Challenge Tour where he his best results were reaching the quarter-finals and last 16. In April 2023 he became the first Czech player to participate in the MODUS Super Series. Sedlák qualified for the 2023 Austrian Darts Open, winning the East European Qualifier.

In October 2023 Sedlák became the second darts player from the Czech Republic after Adam Gawlas to win a PDC title and the first Czech player to win a PDC Challenge Tour title. He won 5–2 against John Henderson at tournament 22 in Wigan.

== Performance timeline ==
Tournament	2022
WDF Ranked televised events
World Masters	5R

=== PDC European Tour ===
Tournament	2022	2023	2024
Czech Open	2R	DNQ	
Austrian Open	DNQ	1R	DNQ
European Matchplay	DNQ	2R	NH
German Grand Prix	DNQ		1R
