= Pavel Jirkal =

Czech darts player

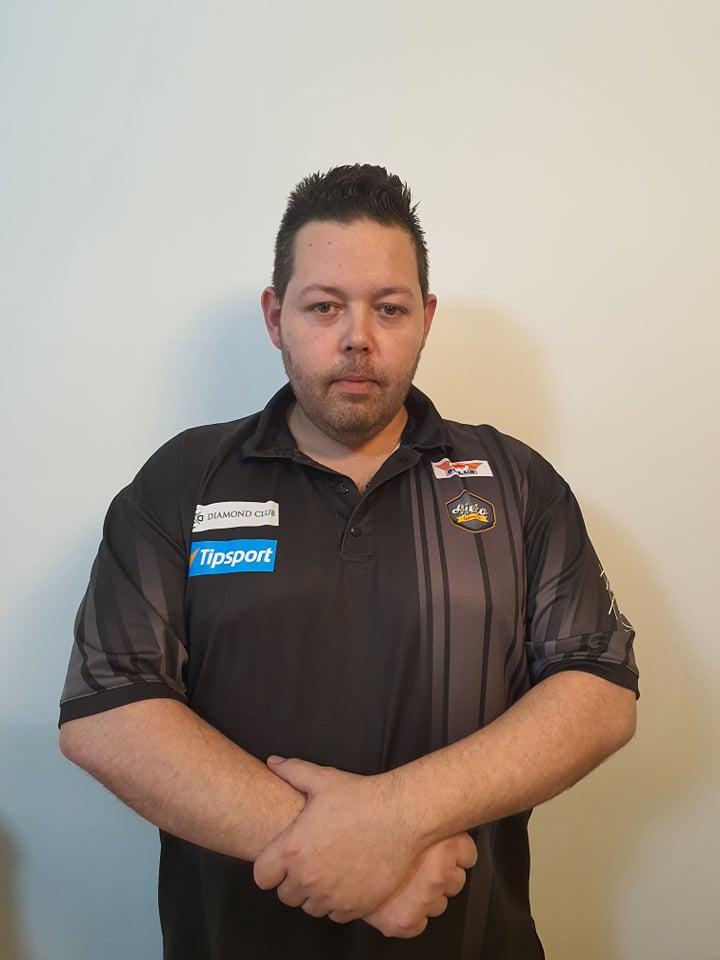
- Jirkal in 2021

Personal information
- Full name: Pavel Jirkal
- Born: 10 April 1983 (age 43) Prague, Czechoslovakia
- Home town: Prague, Czech Republic

Sport
- Sport: Darts
- Playing since: 1997
- Darts: 21g
- Laterality: Right-handed
- Walk-on music: "Relax" by Frankie Goes to Hollywood

Organisation (see split in darts)
- BDO: 2004–2020
- WDF: 2004–

WDF major events – best performances
- World Masters: Last 144: 2015, 2017

Other tournament wins
- Years
Czech Open	2001
Medal record
Men's Darts
Representing Czech Republic
WDF Europe Cup
Silver medal – second place	2018 Budapest	Men's singles
Bronze medal – third place	2018 Budapest	Men's pairs

Pavel Jirkal (born 10 April 1983) is a Czech darts player currently playing in Professional Darts Corporation (PDC) events.

== Career ==
Pavel started playing at the age of 14 and is one of the most experienced Czech players.

In 2001 he won Czech Open, a tournament organised by the British Darts Organisation (BDO), when he defeated another Czech player, Radek Schulz. A year later, he became the World champion U21 in soft-tip darts.

He took part in bigger international tournaments in 2004 and 2005, when he competed in the major tournament World Masters. In 2008 he got a chance to play in four tournaments of PDPA Players Championship, twice he made it among last 64. During years he won many national single and doubles titles.

A bartender by trade, in 2015, he represented his country with Michal Kočík in the 2015 PDC World Cup of Darts, but they were defeated 5–2 in the first round by the Austrian duo of Mensur Suljović and Rowby-John Rodriguez. He made it into last 144 on 2015 World Masters, the same result he repeated in 2017.

Jirkal became Runner-up after losing to Martin Heneghan from Ireland of the 2018 WDF Europe Cup. In November he played an exhibition tournament Prague Darts Masters.

He attended European Q-School in 2019, where he reached the final on Day 3, but lost to Christian Bunse, and he would lose to the Day 4 winner Darius Labanauskas the following day, missing out on a Tour Card. He did then qualify as the East European qualifier for the 2019 European Darts Open in Leverkusen, Germany and also to the 2019 German Darts Open in Saarbrücken. In the first tournament he won 6–1 over William Borland and made it into the second round, where he lost 3–6 to Darren Webster. In the second tournament he lost 0–6 to Luke Humphries. In June he represented Czech republic along with Karel Sedláček in 2019 World Cup of Darts. The Czech republic team lost in the first round with Poland (Krzysztof Ratajski and Tytus Kanik) 2–5.

In early 2020 he participated in PDC European Q-school, three time he made it into last 128, once he was eliminated in last 512. In April 2020 he became one of the ten players of newly found 2020 Tipsport Premier League. It was not really successful journey for him, with just two victories, over Michal Ondo and Daniel Barbořák, he finished 9th after Phase 1 and was eliminated from the tournament.

== Major tournaments results ==
WDF

Turnaj	2016	2017	2018
WDF Europe Cup Singles	L128	DNP	F

BDO

Turnaj	2004	2005	2006–2013	2014	2015	2016	2017	2018
BDO World Darts Championship	DNP	DNP	DNP	DNP	DNQ	DNQ	DNQ	DNQ
Winmau World Masters	L192	L192	DNP	L272	L144	L272	L144	DNP

PDC

Turnaj	2015	2016–2018	2019
PDC World Cup of Darts	L32	DNP	L32
