= Roger Janssen =

Belgian darts player

Personal information
- Nickname: "Gizmo"
- Born: 21 April 1977 (age 49) Antwerp, Belgium
- Home town: Leopoldsburg, Belgium

Sport
- Sport: Darts
- Playing since: 1997
- Darts: 25g
- Laterality: Right-handed
- Walk-on music: "It's a Sin" by Pet Shop Boys

Organisation (see split in darts)
- BDO: 2012–2019

WDF major events – best performances
- World Championship: Last 32: 2019
- World Masters: Last 32: 2018
- World Trophy: Quarter Final: 2019

Other tournament wins
- Years
Hal Masters	2015
Luxembourg Open	2018
Vienna Open	2018

Roger Janssen
Medal record

Men's Darts

Representing Belgium

WDF Europe Cup
Bronze medal – third place	2018 Budapest	Men's singles

Roger Janssen (born 21 April 1977) is a Belgian former professional darts player who played in British Darts Organisation (BDO) events.

== Career ==
Janssen's career began with the 2012 Belgium Open, in which he finished among the Last 64. Since then he has competed in various other competitions, getting to several quarter and semi finals. His, so far, only win was in the 2015 Hal Masters where he beat Martin Adams 3–2.

== World Championship results ==
=== BDO ===
- 2017: Last 40 (lost to Mark McGrath 2–3) (sets)
- 2019: Last 32 (lost to Jim Williams 2–3)
