= Michal Ondo =

Czech darts player

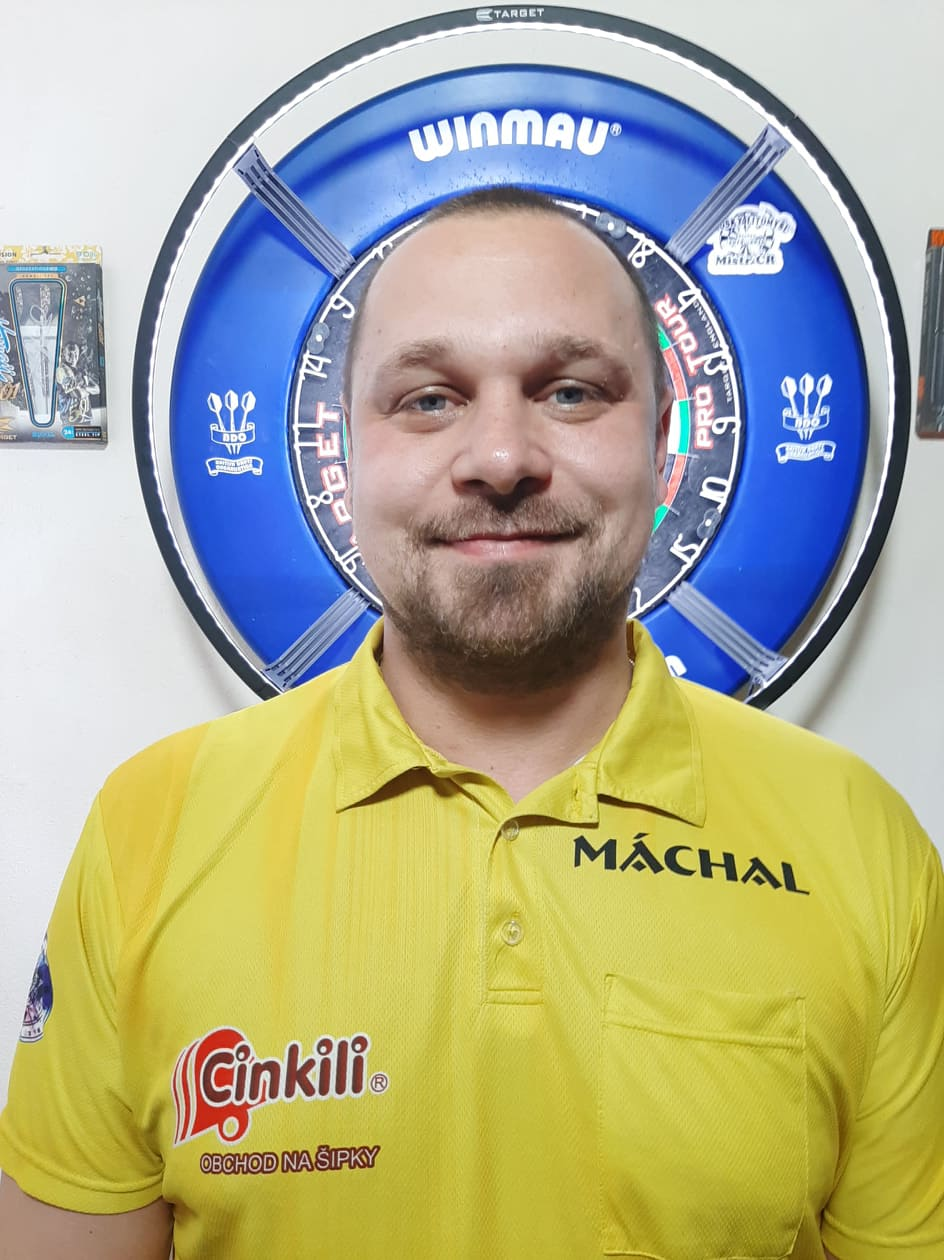

Personal information
- Nickname: "Máchal"
- Born: 20 February 1985 (age 41) Vysoké Mýto, Czech Republic
- Home town: Zderaz, Czech Republic

Sport
- Sport: Darts
- Playing since: 2001
- Darts: 23g Target
- Laterality: Right-handed

Organisation (see split in darts)
- BDO: 2011–2020
- WDF: 2011–

WDF major events – best performances
- World Masters: Last 48: 2015
Medal record
Men's Darts
Representing Czech Republic
WDF Europe Cup
Bronze medal – third place	2018 Budapest	Men's pairs

Michal Ondo (born 20 February 1985), nicknamed Máchal, is a Czech professional darts player and a member of the team Barbaři Sedlec.

== Career ==
Michal started playing in 2001 and he belongs to successful Czech players.

In soft-tip darts he is fourth times National champion in teams and in 2017 he dominated the tournament in singles.

His first successful year in steel darts came in 2011, in which he made three big achievements. He became National champion in singles and also started to compete abroad, finishing 3rd in Hungaria Open and Vienna Open. In 2012 he became National champion in teams with DC Bizoni. In 2014 he finished 3rd in Romania Open. In the same year he won in Czech Cup and in the National championship in doubles. In 2015 he triumphed again in Czech Cup and he managed to win doubles tournament on the biggest darts tournament in Czech republic – Czech Open. Following year, 2016, he won Czech Cup for the third time and he repeated the 3rd place from Hungaria Open as well.

Between 2011 and 2017 he attempted to qualify for BDO World Darts Championship, but never succeeded. He took part in six major tournaments, World Masters, making it into last 48 in 2015.

In 2018, he finished 3rd in WDF Europe Cup which is probably his big achievement so far. In the same year, he became National champion with the team Barbaři Sedlec. In November he took part in the exhibition Prague Darts Masters and he played against Peter Wright.

In 2019 he won National championship in doubles for the third time, this year with Michal Šmejda. He also competed in PDC European Q-school 2019, three times making in into last 128 and last 64 in the last tournament. In November he qualified for another exhibition, Prague Darts Master Souboj legend, where also Phil Taylor played.

In 2020 he tried PDC European Q-school again, making it into last 32 on Day 3. The other days he was eliminated in last 512, last 256 and last 128, which was not enough to secure the Tour card. In April 2020 he became one of the ten players of newly found 2020 Tipsport Premier League.

== Major tournaments results ==
WDF

Turnaj	2010	2011	2012	2013	2014	2015	2016	2017	2018
WDF Europe Cup Singles	L64	NH	L64	NH	L16	NH	L128	NH	L64

BDO

Turnaj	2011	2012	2013	2014	2015	2016
Winmau World Masters	L72	L144	L144	L144	L48	L272
