= 2019 European Darts Open =

Tournament information
- Dates: 22–24 March 2019
- Venue: Ostermann-Arena
- Location: Leverkusen
- Country: Germany
- Organisation(s): PDC
- Format: Legs
- Prize fund: £140,000
- Winner's share: £25,000
- Nine-dart finish: (Netherlands) Michael van Gerwen
- High checkout: 170 (England) Justin Pipe (Netherlands) Michael van Gerwen

Champion(s)
- (Netherlands) Michael van Gerwen

The 2019 European Darts Open was the first of thirteen PDC European Tour events on the 2019 PDC Pro Tour. The tournament took place at Ostermann-Arena, Leverkusen, Germany, from 22–24 March 2019. It featured a field of 48 players and £140,000 in prize money, with £25,000 going to the winner.

Michael van Gerwen was the defending champion after defeating Peter Wright 8–7 in the final of the 2018 tournament, and he defended his title by defeating Rob Cross 8–6 in the final.

In his semi-final win over Mensur Suljović, Van Gerwen became the first player to hit two nine-darters on the European Tour, taking out 147 via T19-Bull-D20, which was also the first time a filmed nine-dart finish included a bullseye, but not as the final dart (as all the previous three were double in/double out nine-darters in the World Grand Prix).

== Prize money ==
This is how the prize money is divided:

Stage (num. of players)		Prize money
Winner	(1)	£25,000
Runner-up	(1)	£10,000
Semi-finalists	(2)	£6,500
Quarter-finalists	(4)	£5,000
Third round losers	(8)	£3,000
Second round losers	(16)	£2,000*
First round losers	(16)	£1,000
Total	£140,000	

- Seeded players who lose in the second round do not receive this prize money on any Orders of Merit.

== Qualification and format ==
The top 16 entrants from the PDC ProTour Order of Merit on 12 February will automatically qualify for the event and will be seeded in the second round.

The remaining 32 places will go to players from six qualifying events – 18 from the UK Tour Card Holder Qualifier (held on 22 February), six from the European Tour Card Holder Qualifier (held on 22 February), two from the West & South European Associate Member Qualifier (held on 21 March), four from the Host Nation Qualifier (held on 21 March), one from the Nordic & Baltic Qualifier (held on 5 October 2018) and one from the East European Associate Member Qualifier (held on 19 January).

From 2019, the Host Nation, Nordic & Baltic and East European Qualifiers will only be available to non-Tour Card holders. Any Tour Card holders from the applicable regions will have to play the main European Qualifier. The only exceptions being that the Nordic & Baltic qualifiers for the first 3 European Tour events took place in late 2018, before the new ruling was announced, hence why Madars Razma qualified by this method, as under the new rules, he would have had to enter the European Tour Card Holder Qualifier, after regaining his Tour Card at European Q-School in January 2019.

The following players will take part in the tournament:

Top 16

1. (Netherlands) Michael van Gerwen (champion)
2. (England) Ian White (second round)
3. (Scotland) Peter Wright (semi-finals)
4. (England) James Wade (quarter-finals)
5. (Austria) Mensur Suljović (semi-finals)
6. (England) Adrian Lewis (second round)
7. (England) Rob Cross (runner-up)
8. (England) Michael Smith (second round)
9. (Wales) Gerwyn Price (quarter-finals)
10. (Wales) Jonny Clayton (third round)
11. (Northern Ireland) Daryl Gurney (quarter-finals)
12. (England) Joe Cullen (third round)
13. (England) Dave Chisnall (third round)
14. (Australia) Simon Whitlock (second round)
15. (England) Darren Webster (third round)
16. (Netherlands) Jermaine Wattimena (third round)

UK Qualifier
- (England) Mervyn King (second round)
- (England) Justin Pipe (quarter-finals)
- (England) Scott Taylor (second round)
- (England) Ricky Williams (first round)
- (England) Adam Hunt (second round)
- (England) Steve Beaton (second round)
- (Scotland) William Borland (first round)
- (England) Ross Smith (third round)
- (England) Glen Durrant (second round)
- (England) Ritchie Edhouse (first round)
- (England) Josh Payne (first round)
- (England) Jason Wilson (first round)
- (England) Ted Evetts (second round)
- (England) Wayne Jones (first round)
- (England) Matthew Dennant (second round)
- (England) Ryan Meikle (first round)
- (England) Matthew Edgar (first round)
- (England) Martin Atkins (Leeds) (first round)

European Qualifier
- (Belgium) Kim Huybrechts (second round)
- (Netherlands) Jeffrey de Zwaan (second round)
- (Poland) Krzysztof Ratajski (third round)
- (Belgium) Dimitri Van den Bergh (third round)
- (Netherlands) Raymond van Barneveld (first round)
- (Netherlands) Vincent van der Voort (second round)

West/South European Qualifier
- (Netherlands) Wesley Plaisier (second round)
- (Netherlands) Danny van Trijp (first round)

Host Nation Qualifier
- (Germany) Fabian Herz (first round)
- (Germany) Michael Rosenauer (first round)
- (Germany) Nico Kurz (first round)
- (Germany) Jyhan Artut (first round)

Nordic & Baltic Qualifier
- (Latvia) Madars Razma (first round)

East European Qualifier
- (Czech Republic) Pavel Jirkal (second round)

== Draw ==
First round (best of 11 legs); 22 March
(England) Jason Wilson 77.84	1
(England) Mervyn King 85.97	6
(Germany) Michael Rosenauer 87.14	4
(England) Glen Durrant 94.41	6
(England) Matthew Edgar 86.07	5
(Poland) Krzysztof Ratajski 86.85	6
(Germany) Fabian Herz 82.42	3
(England) Scott Taylor 91.58	6
(England) Matthew Dennant 88.11	6
(Latvia) Madars Razma 93.68	5
(England) Wayne Jones 84.55	2
(Netherlands) Vincent van der Voort 90.94	6
(Netherlands) Wesley Plaisier 85.03	6
(Germany) Jyhan Artut 81.22	4
(England) Ted Evetts 88.61	6
(England) Martin Atkins 84.93	3
(England) Justin Pipe 94.61	6
(England) Ryan Meikle 86.32	3
(Czech Republic) Pavel Jirkal 81.91	6
(Scotland) William Borland 72.32	1
(England) Steve Beaton 89.42	6
(Netherlands) Raymond van Barneveld 91.46	4
(England) Adam Hunt 97.24	6
(Netherlands) Danny van Trijp 92.64	3
(England) Ritchie Edhouse 85.30	1
(Belgium) Dimitri Van den Bergh 94.72	6
(Netherlands) Jeffrey de Zwaan 91.01	6
(England) Josh Payne 84.92	1
(Belgium) Kim Huybrechts 87.03	6
(Germany) Nico Kurz 87.42	5
(England) Ross Smith 92.97	6
(England) Ricky Williams 82.50	0

Second round (best of 11 legs); 23 March
1	(Netherlands) Michael van Gerwen 97.68	6
(England) Mervyn King 82.06	1
16	(Netherlands) Jermaine Wattimena 102.16	6
(England) Glen Durrant 97.79	5
8	(England) Michael Smith 98.77	5
(Poland) Krzysztof Ratajski 105.57	6
9	(Wales) Gerwyn Price 97.39	6
(England) Scott Taylor 86.63	3
5	(Austria) Mensur Suljović 99.65	6
(England) Matthew Dennant 91.73	4
12	(England) Joe Cullen 97.20	6
(Netherlands) Vincent van der Voort 91.55	1
4	(England) James Wade 97.87	6
(Netherlands) Wesley Plaisier 92.49	3
13	(England) Dave Chisnall 100.28	6
(England) Ted Evetts 90.74	2
2	(England) Ian White 87.83	5
(England) Justin Pipe 89.44	6
15	(England) Darren Webster 87.43	6
(Czech Republic) Pavel Jirkal 81.08	3
7	(England) Rob Cross 101.37	6
(England) Steve Beaton 95.83	3
10	(Wales) Jonny Clayton 85.01	6
(England) Adam Hunt 86.54	3
6	(England) Adrian Lewis 102.52	3
(Belgium) Dimitri Van den Bergh 102.29	6
11	(Northern Ireland) Daryl Gurney 90.98	6
(Netherlands) Jeffrey de Zwaan 90.21	2
3	(Scotland) Peter Wright 101.03	6
(Belgium) Kim Huybrechts 86.56	2
14	(Australia) Simon Whitlock 93.74	5
(England) Ross Smith 92.69	6

Third round (best of 11 legs); 24 March
1	(Netherlands) van Gerwen 101.33	6
16	(Netherlands) Wattimena 90.14	0
(Poland) Ratajski 87.15	4
9	(Wales) Price 89.26	6
5	(Austria) Suljović 93.81	6
12	(England) Cullen 99.77	3
4	(England) Wade 101.79	6
13	(England) Chisnall 98.41	1
(England) Pipe 96.64	6
15	(England) Webster 90.21	1
7	(England) Cross 105.74	6
10	(Wales) Clayton 100.45	4
(Belgium) Van den Bergh 85.74	0
11	(Northern Ireland) Gurney 94.93	6
3	(Scotland) Wright 101.57	6
(England) R. Smith 96.46	3

Quarter-finals (best of 11 legs); 24 March
1	(Netherlands) van Gerwen 102.88	6
9	(Wales) Price 103.32	5
5	(Austria) Suljović 102.26	6
4	(England) Wade 94.97	2
(England) Pipe 92.55	2
7	(England) Cross 101.63	6
11	(Northern Ireland) Gurney 93.38	3
3	(Scotland) Wright 92.83	6

Semi-finals (best of 13 legs); 24 March
1	(Netherlands) van Gerwen 96.61	7
5	(Austria) Suljović 87.73	5
7	(England) Cross 104.24	7
3	(Scotland) Wright 99.33	5

Final (best of 15 legs); 24 March
1	(Netherlands) van Gerwen 104.79	8
7	(England) Cross 100.27	6
