= 2020 Tipsport Premier League =

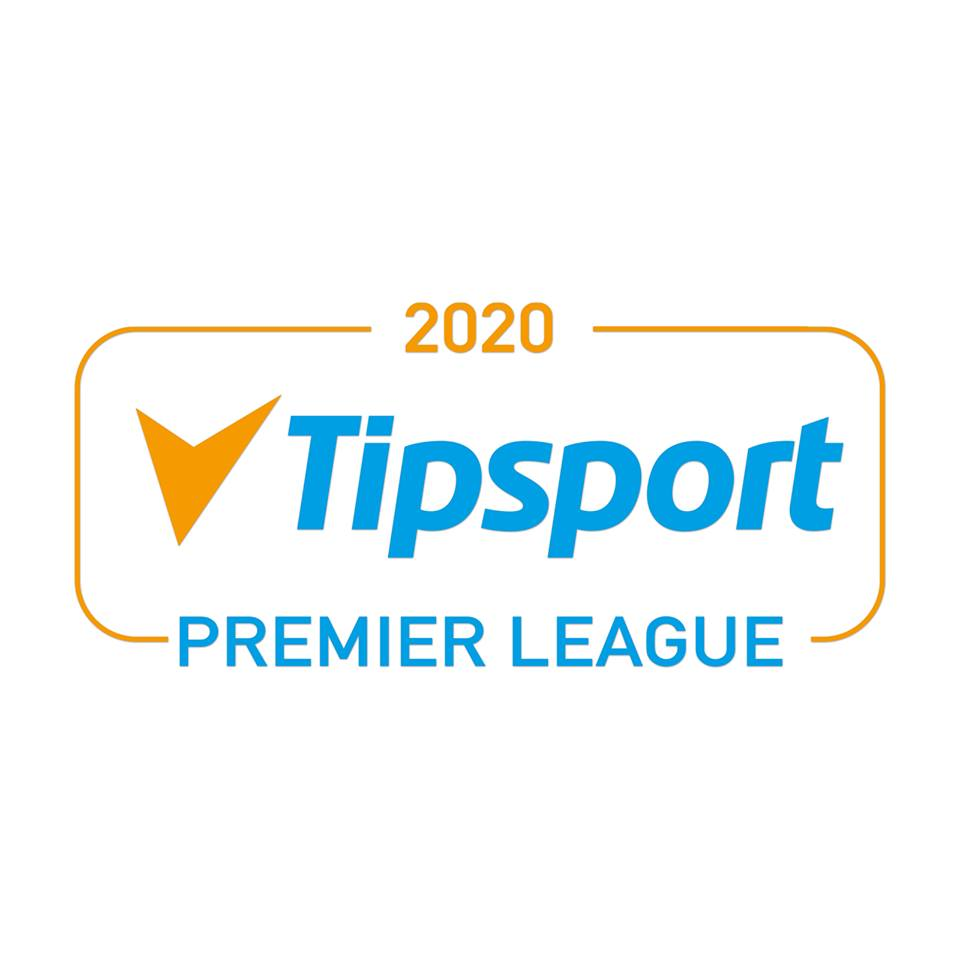
- Winner
- Vítězslav Sedlák
- Runner-up
- Alexander Mašek
- Score
- 10 - 6
- Dates
- 7 April to 28 May 2020
- Edition
- 1st
- Number of players
- 10
- Rounds
- 16
- Number of 180s overall
- 185
- Highest Checkout
- (Czech Republic) Daniel Barbořák 170
- 2020 | 2021 >

2020 Tipsport Premier League was a darts tournament - the first edition in its history. The tournament was inspired by Premier League Darts, which is organized by the professional darts organisation, PDC. The idea to play this tournament was created during the world-wide pandemic of COVID-19. The meaning of the competition is, apart from the fight against the coronavirus, also an introduction of more Czech players to the general public. For players it is a great opportunity to practice and compete during this hard time and to gain much needed experience for future years of their careers. The winner of the first edition was Vítězslav Sedlák, who defeated in the final 10 - 6 Alexander Mašek.

== Format ==
The format of the tournament is very similar to Premier League Darts, which is organised by the PDC. The main difference is the absence of a draw, each match has a winner and a loser. Each match starts with a bulls-eye shootout, which decides who will start the match. The first player to throw on the bulls-eye is the one that is listed as the first in the schedule. Values of the shootout are: 50 - the red middle; 25 - the green middle; outside. If both players score the same value, the shootout continues in the reversed order until the decision.

Phase 1: In the first phase of the competition (9 rounds), ten players play each other. Phase 1 matches have a maximum of eleven legs, allowing for the winner being first to six. At the end of Phase 1, the two bottom players are eliminated from the competition.

Phase 2: In the second phase of the competition (7 rounds), eight remaining players play again each other. Phase 2 matches have a maximum of thirteen legs, allowing for the winner being first to seven. At the end of Phase 2, the bottom four players in the league table are eliminated from the competition. The first four players in the league table qualify for the Play-off.

Play-off: The top four players in the league table contest the two knockout semi-finals with 1st playing 4th and 2nd playing 3rd. The semi-finals are first to 10 legs (best of 19). The two winning semi-finalists meet in the final which is also best of 19.

== Venues ==
Due to the coronavirus outbreak and regulations from the government of the Czech Republic, all players will play from their home. All players have a webcam prepared in their home environment, through which it is possible to watch every thrown dart. After each throw, players announce their score. Viewers see both dartboards at the same time, along with the scoreboard which is powered by DartConnect.

Map of player's locations

== Prize money ==
The first edition of the tournament does not include any prize money for players. On the contrary, the tournament has a charity meaning. For every thrown "180", the official partner of 2020 Tipsport Premier League, the company Tipsport, donates 500 CZK for purchase of medical equipment (face masks, ventilators etc.) for the fight against the coronavirus.

== Players ==
For the first edition of Tipsport Premier League, 10 players have been chosen in advance including the former PDC World Youth Championship runner-up and JDC World Darts Championship runner-up, Adam Gawlas and the former PDC World Cup of Darts national team member, Pavel Jirkal. Other players have experience from international tournaments and are the best players in Czech Republic. The current Czech number one, Karel Sedláček, though invited, could not compete due to the contract obligations to PDC.

Player
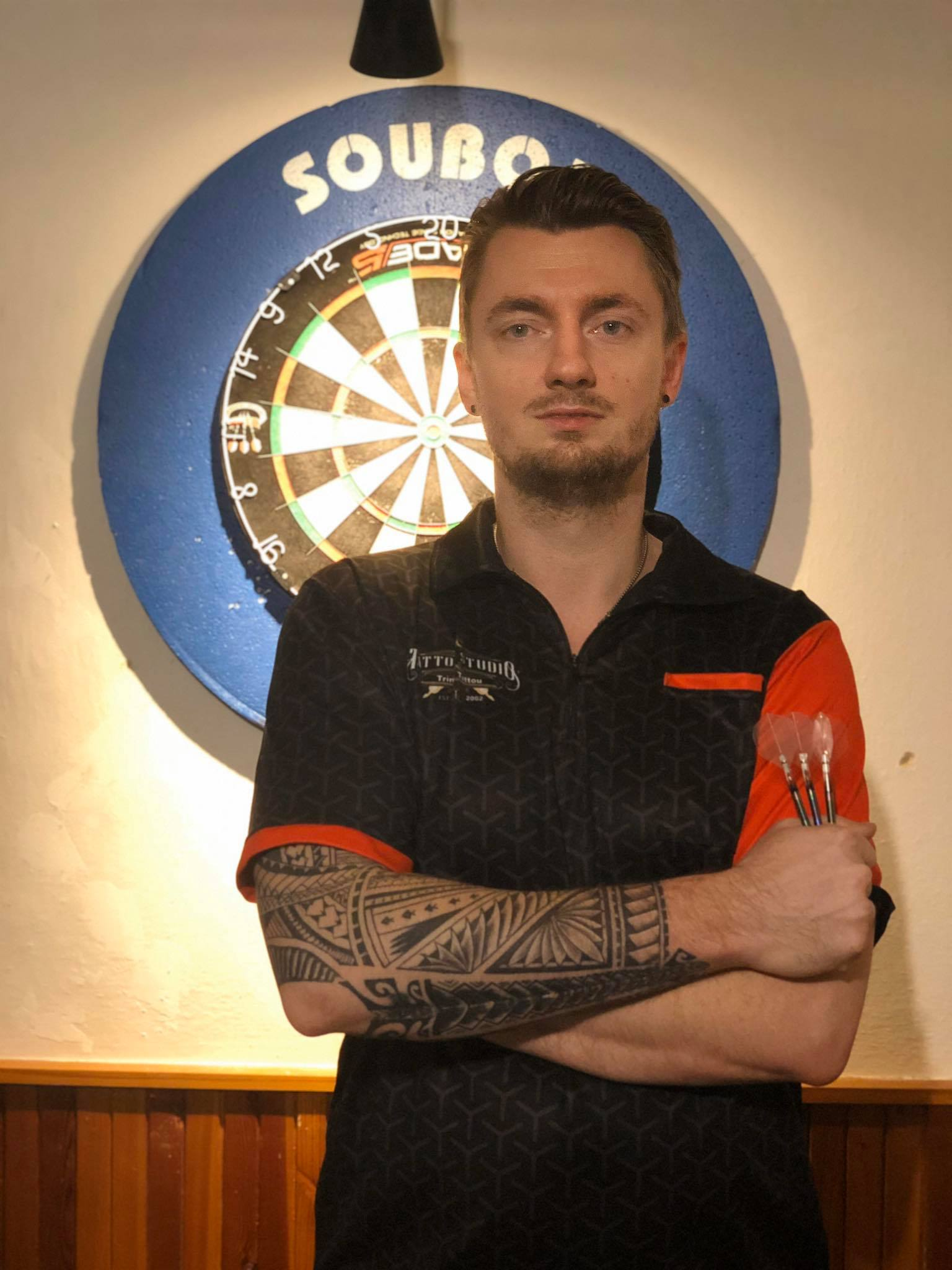
(Czech Republic) Daniel Barbořák
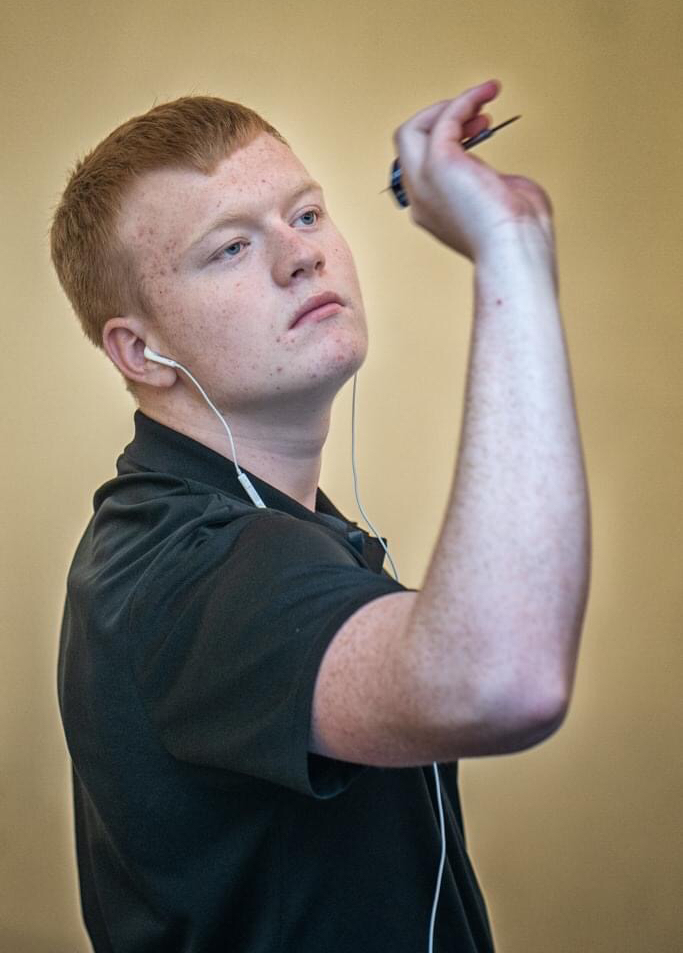
(Czech Republic) Adam Gawlas
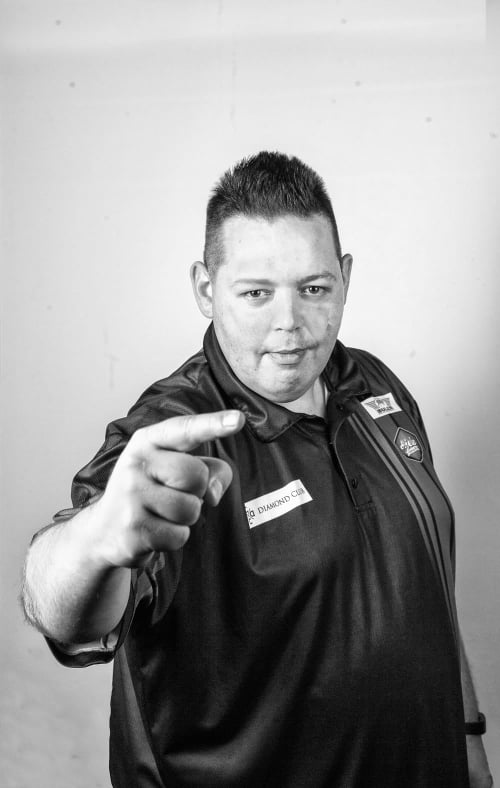
(Czech Republic) Pavel Jirkal
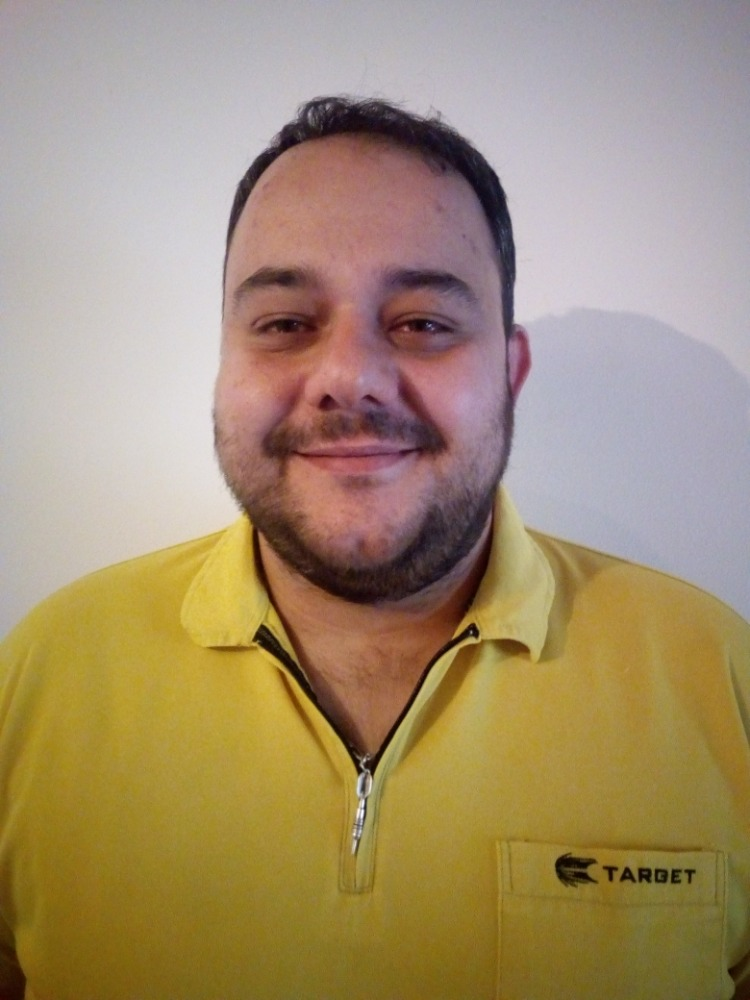
(Czech Republic) Ondřej Kysilka
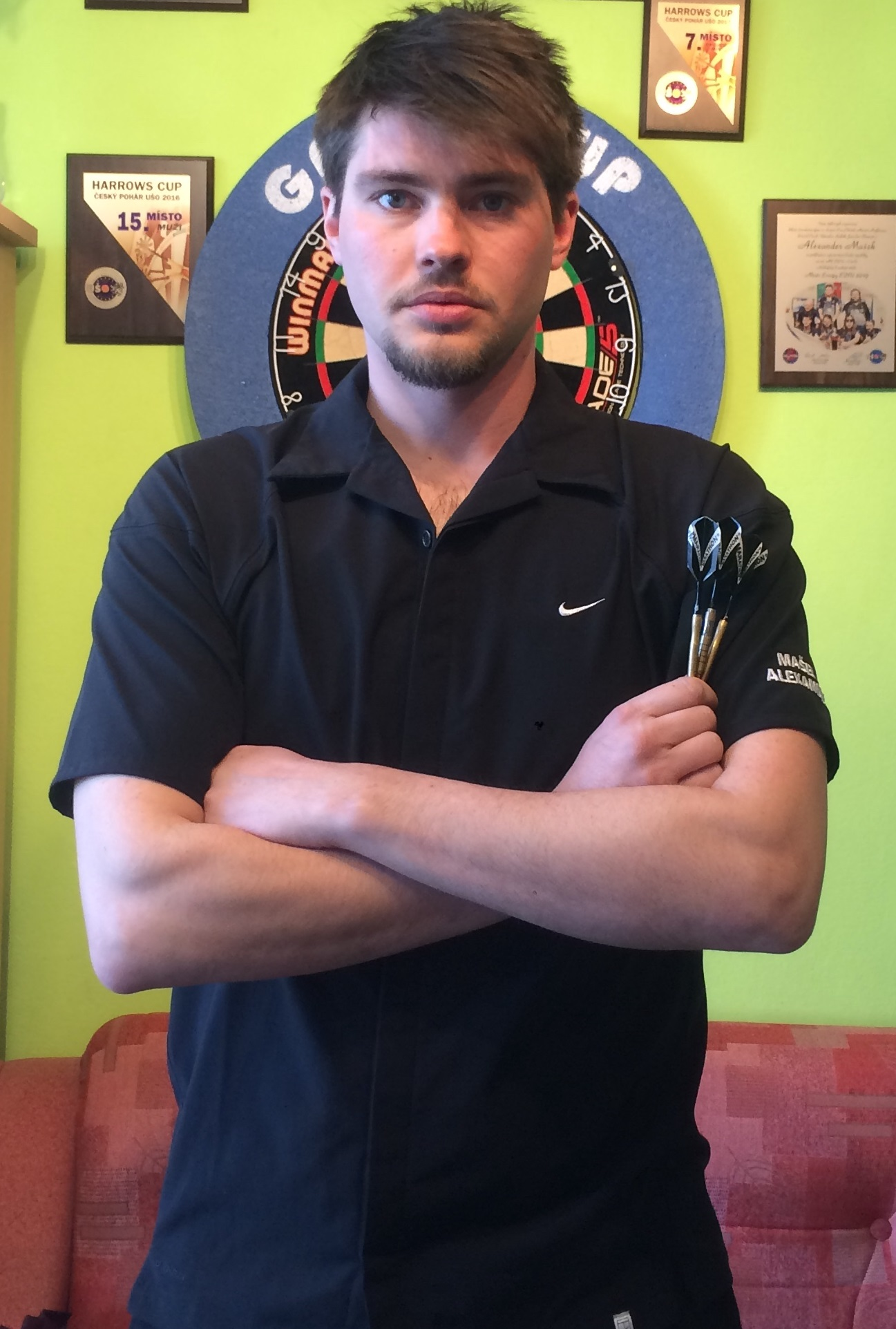
(Czech Republic) Alexander Mašek
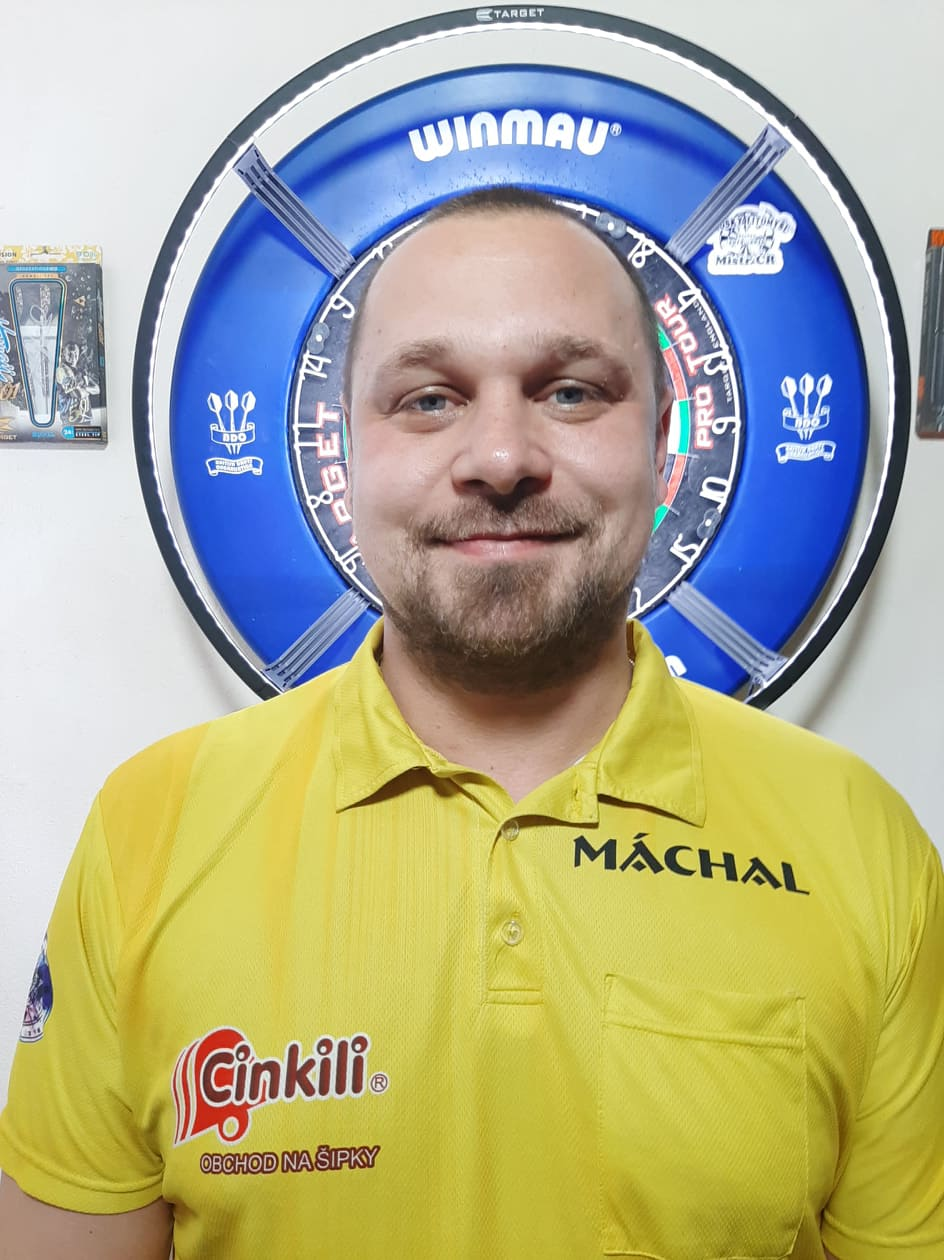
(Czech Republic) Michal Ondo
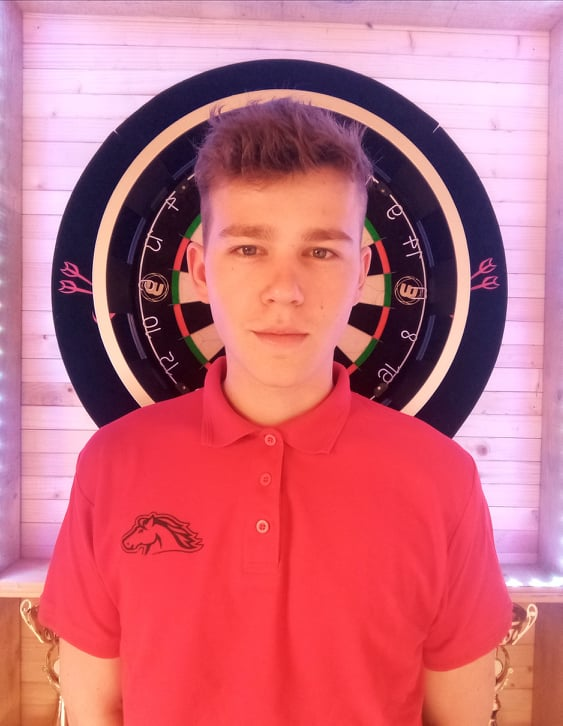
(Czech Republic) David Písek
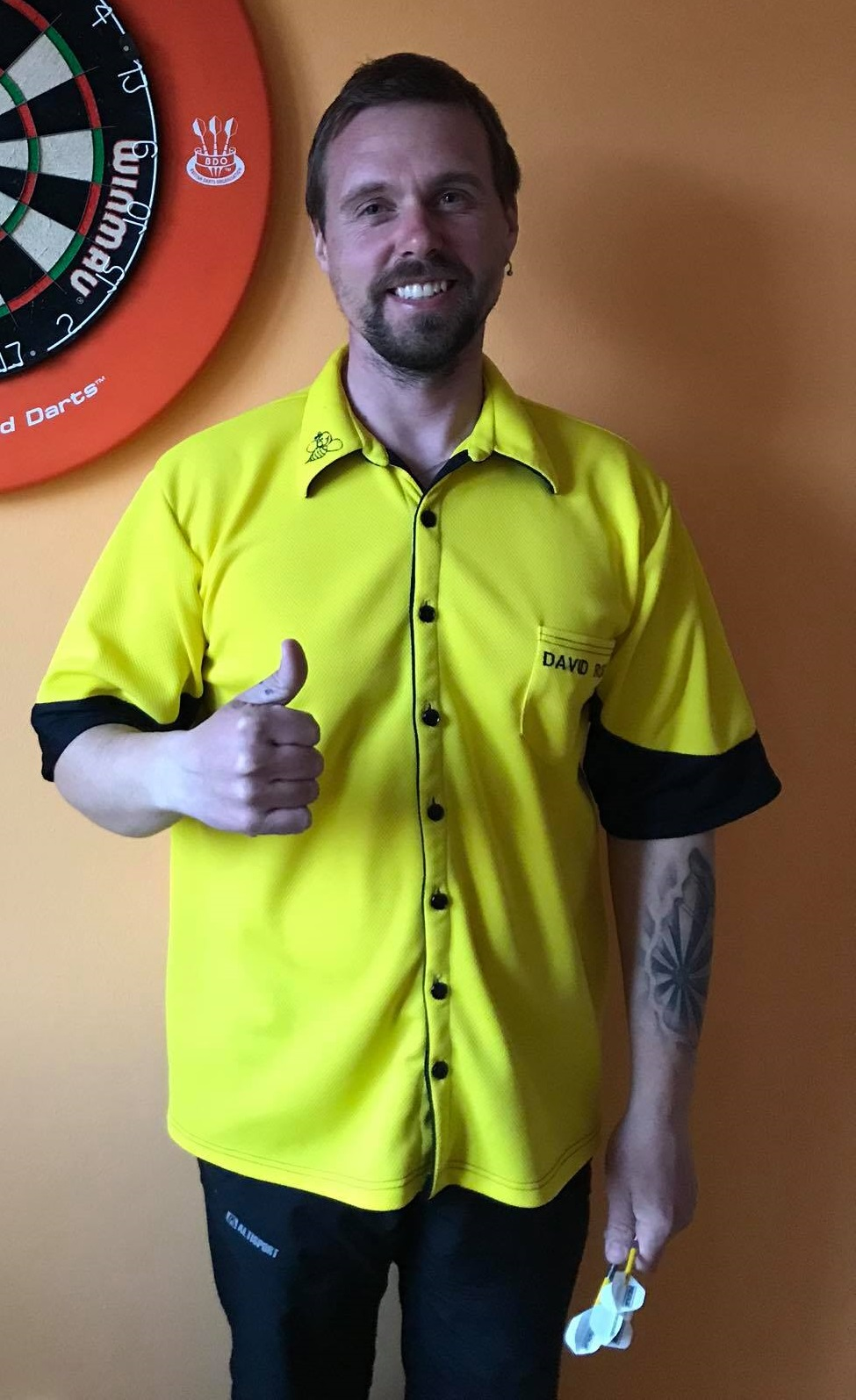
(Czech Republic) David Rosí
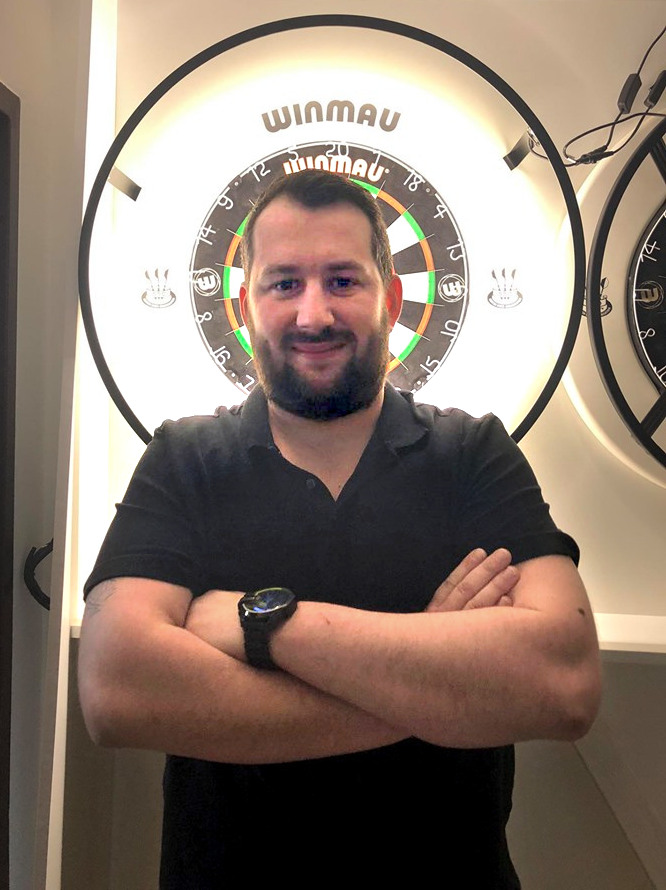
(Czech Republic) Vítězslav Sedlák
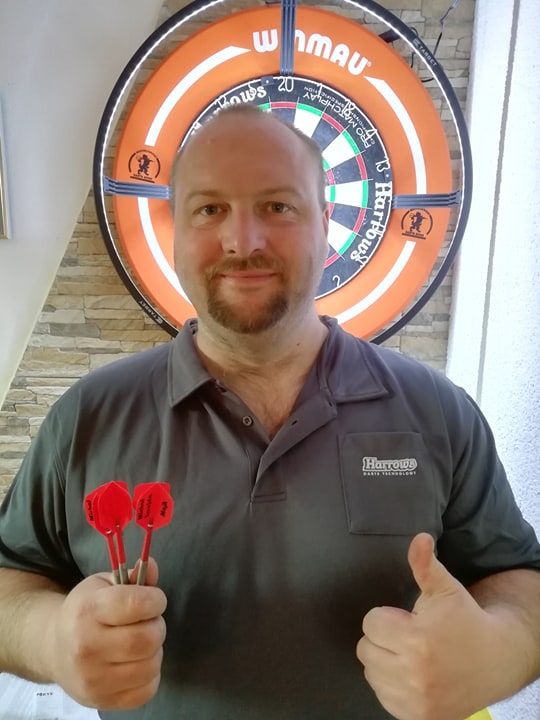
(Czech Republic) Michal Šmejda

== League stage ==
=== 7. April - round 1 (phase 1) ===
(best of 11 legs)

	Score	
Pavel Jirkal (Czech Republic); 69.10	5 – 6	(Czech Republic) Michal Šmejda; 76.30
David Rosí (Czech Republic); 63.40	0 – 6	(Czech Republic) David Písek; 76.40
Ondřej Kysilka (Czech Republic); 78.80	2 – 6	(Czech Republic) Adam Gawlas; 80.30
Michal Ondo (Czech Republic); 72.60	3 – 6	(Czech Republic) Vítězslav Sedlák; 80.30
Daniel Barbořák (Czech Republic); 82.90	6 – 2	(Czech Republic) Alexander Mašek; 84.90
Night's Average: 76.50
Highest Checkout: (Czech Republic) David Písek 112
Most 180s: (Czech Republic) David Písek, (Czech Republic) Adam Gawlas and (Czech Republic) Ondřej Kysilka: 2
Night's 180s: 8

=== 8. April- round 2 (phase 1) ===
(best of 11 legs)

	Score	
Alexander Mašek (Czech Republic); 83.50	6 – 5	(Czech Republic) Michal Ondo; 82.70
Daniel Barbořák (Czech Republic); 73.50	3 – 6	(Czech Republic) Adam Gawlas; 84.90
Michal Šmejda (Czech Republic); 74.50	6 – 0	(Czech Republic) David Rosí; 64.60
Vítězslav Sedlák (Czech Republic); 84.20	6 – 4	(Czech Republic) Pavel Jirkal; 82.10
David Písek (Czech Republic); 79.70	2 – 6	(Czech Republic) Ondřej Kysilka; 78.70
Night's Average: 78.84
Highest Checkout: (Czech Republic) Pavel Jirkal 113
Most 180s: (Czech Republic) Ondřej Kysilka 2
Night's 180s: 7

=== 9. April - round 3 (phase 1) ===
(best of 11 legs)

	Score	
David Rosí (Czech Republic); 69.70	2 – 6	(Czech Republic) Daniel Barbořák; 76.30
Ondřej Kysilka (Czech Republic); 81.80	6 – 3	(Czech Republic) Alexander Mašek; 77.70
Pavel Jirkal (Czech Republic); 81.20	6 – 2	(Czech Republic) Michal Ondo; 71.70
Adam Gawlas (Czech Republic); 92.60	6 – 2	(Czech Republic) Michal Šmejda; 82.30
David Písek (Czech Republic); 81.20	6 – 4	(Czech Republic) Vítězslav Sedlák; 82.70
Night's Average: 79.72
Highest Checkout: (Czech Republic) Michal Ondo 122
Most 180s: (Czech Republic) Alexander Mašek 4
Night's 180s: 10

=== 15. April - round 4 (phase 1) ===
(best of 11 legs)

	Score	
Michal Šmejda (Czech Republic); 81.20	6 – 0	(Czech Republic) Alexander Mašek; 77.80
David Rosí (Czech Republic); 74.50	6 – 5	(Czech Republic) Pavel Jirkal; 80.20
Ondřej Kysilka (Czech Republic); 82.80	4 – 6	(Czech Republic) Michal Ondo; 78.30
David Písek (Czech Republic); 79.00	2 – 6	(Czech Republic) Daniel Barbořák; 86.60
Adam Gawlas (Czech Republic); 87.90	2 – 6	(Czech Republic) Vítězslav Sedlák; 85.40
Night's Average: 81.37
Highest Checkout: (Czech Republic) Vítězslav Sedlák 122
Most 180s: (Czech Republic) Alexander Mašek, David Rosí, Daniel Barbořák, Adam Gawlas and Vítězslav Sedlák 2
Night's 180s: 10

=== 16. April - round 5 (phase 1) ===
(best of 11 legs)

	Score	
Ondřej Kysilka (Czech Republic); 73.30	6 – 4	(Czech Republic) David Rosí; 68.20
Michal Šmejda (Czech Republic); 71.80	5 – 6	(Czech Republic) Michal Ondo; 75.50
Adam Gawlas (Czech Republic); 83.30	4 – 6	(Czech Republic) Alexander Mašek; 82.40
David Písek (Czech Republic); 89.70	6 – 2	(Czech Republic) Pavel Jirkal; 75.50
Vítězslav Sedlák (Czech Republic); 77.80	4 – 6	(Czech Republic) Daniel Barbořák; 73.60
Night's Average: 77.11
Highest Checkout: (Czech Republic) David Písek 129
Most 180s: (Czech Republic) David Písek 3
Night's 180s: 7

=== 22. April - round 6 (phase 1) ===
(best of 11 legs)

	Score	
Michal Ondo (Czech Republic); 72.60	6 – 5	(Czech Republic) David Písek; 77.80
David Rosí (Czech Republic); 83.70	1 – 6	(Czech Republic) Adam Gawlas; 87.30
Pavel Jirkal (Czech Republic); 77.20	4 – 6	(Czech Republic) Ondřej Kysilka; 77.30
Alexander Mašek (Czech Republic); 88.50	6 – 4	(Czech Republic) Vítězslav Sedlák; 83.60
Daniel Barbořák (Czech Republic); 98.00	6 – 0	(Czech Republic) Michal Šmejda; 77.30
Night's Average: 82.33
Highest Checkout: (Czech Republic) Daniel Barbořák 170
Most 180s: (Czech Republic) David Písek and Vítězslav Sedlák 3
Night's 180s: 9

=== 23. April - round 7 (phase 1) ===
(best of 11 legs)

	Score	
Pavel Jirkal (Czech Republic); 70.80	4 – 6	(Czech Republic) Alexander Mašek; 70.80
Michal Ondo (Czech Republic); 75.20	1 – 6	(Czech Republic) Daniel Barbořák; 79.80
Ondřej Kysilka (Czech Republic); 78.30	4 – 6	(Czech Republic) Michal Šmejda; 83.30
Adam Gawlas (Czech Republic); 87.00	6 – 5	(Czech Republic) David Písek; 80.30
David Rosí (Czech Republic); 62.50	1 – 6	(Czech Republic) Vítězslav Sedlák; 67.50
Night's Average: 75.55
Highest Checkout: (Czech Republic) Pavel Jirkal and (Czech Republic) Ondřej Kysilka 145
Most 180s: (Czech Republic) Adam Gawlas 2
Night's 180s: 6

=== 29. April - round 8 (phase 1) ===
(best of 11 legs)

	Score	
Michal Ondo (Czech Republic); 79.50	6 – 3	(Czech Republic) David Rosí; 67.20
Alexander Mašek (Czech Republic); 77.90	6 – 5	(Czech Republic) David Písek; 79.30
Adam Gawlas (Czech Republic); 76.80	6 – 1	(Czech Republic) Pavel Jirkal; 73.40
Daniel Barbořák (Czech Republic); 85.70	6 – 4	(Czech Republic) Ondřej Kysilka; 81.30
Vítězslav Sedlák (Czech Republic); 94.20	6 – 4	(Czech Republic) Michal Šmejda; 91.30
Night's Average: 80.66
Highest Checkout: (Czech Republic) Ondřej Kysilka 133
Most 180s: (Czech Republic) David Písek 3
Night's 180s: 9

=== 30. April - round 9 (phase 1) ===
(best of 11 legs)

	Score	
Michal Šmejda (Czech Republic); 75.50	1 – 6	(Czech Republic) David Písek; 83.80
Alexander Mašek (Czech Republic); 74.10	6 – 2	(Czech Republic) David Rosí; 63.00
Michal Ondo (Czech Republic); 84.00	6 – 4	(Czech Republic) Adam Gawlas; 83.10
Vítězslav Sedlák (Czech Republic); 76.60	3 – 6	(Czech Republic) Ondřej Kysilka; 78.10
Daniel Barbořák (Czech Republic); 78.60	4 – 6	(Czech Republic) Pavel Jirkal; 77.40
Night's Average: 77.42
Highest Checkout: (Czech Republic) Pavel Jirkal 147
Most 180s: (Czech Republic) David Písek 3
Night's 180s: 8

=== 6. May - round 10 (phase 2) ===
(best of 13 legs)

	Score	
Ondřej Kysilka (Czech Republic); 80.40	5 – 7	(Czech Republic) Alexander Mašek; 83.00
Daniel Barbořák (Czech Republic); 79.20	7 – 6	(Czech Republic) Michal Ondo; 78.50
Michal Šmejda (Czech Republic); 82.00	5 – 7	(Czech Republic) David Písek; 82.40
Adam Gawlas (Czech Republic); 84.10	6 – 7	(Czech Republic) Vítězslav Sedlák; 89.40
Night's Average: 82.38
Highest Checkout: (Czech Republic) David Písek 118
Most 180s: (Czech Republic) Vítězslav Sedlák 7
Night's 180s: 18

=== 7. May - round 11 (phase 2) ===
(best of 13 legs)

	Score	
Adam Gawlas (Czech Republic); 84.00	7 – 5	(Czech Republic) David Písek; 87.40
Michal Šmejda (Czech Republic); 74.50	7 – 4	(Czech Republic) Daniel Barbořák; 74.50
Alexander Mašek (Czech Republic); 84.10	7 – 6	(Czech Republic) Vítězslav Sedlák; 87.40
Michal Ondo (Czech Republic); 79.30	6 – 7	(Czech Republic) Ondřej Kysilka; 80.60
Night's Average: 81.20
Highest Checkout: (Czech Republic) Adam Gawlas 123
Most 180s: (Czech Republic) David Písek 4
Night's 180s: 11

=== 13. May - round 12 (phase 2) ===
(best of 13 legs)

	Score	
Ondřej Kysilka (Czech Republic); 82.40	5 – 7	(Czech Republic) Vítězslav Sedlák; 84.10
Michal Šmejda (Czech Republic); 70.20	7 – 2	(Czech Republic) Michal Ondo; 69.10
David Písek (Czech Republic); 78.60	4 – 7	(Czech Republic) Alexander Mašek; 87.00
Adam Gawlas (Czech Republic); 94.90	7 – 1	(Czech Republic) Daniel Barbořák; 81.30
Night's Average: 80.95
Highest Checkout: (Czech Republic) Vítězslav Sedlák 127
Most 180s: (Czech Republic) Ondřej Kysilka and (Czech Republic) Adam Gawlas 4
Night's 180s: 13

=== 14. May - round 13 (phase 2) ===
(best of 13 legs)

	Score	
Adam Gawlas (Czech Republic); 84.20	7 – 5	(Czech Republic) Michal Ondo; 77.90
Ondřej Kysilka (Czech Republic); 76.50	3 – 7	(Czech Republic) Michal Šmejda; 75.10
Vítězslav Sedlák (Czech Republic); 83.90	7 – 3	(Czech Republic) David Písek; 86.50
Alexander Mašek (Czech Republic); 86.50	5 – 7	(Czech Republic) Daniel Barbořák; 83.40
Night's Average: 81.75
Highest Checkout: (Czech Republic) Adam Gawlas 110
Most 180s: (Czech Republic) Alexander Mašek 3
Night's 180s: 9

=== 20. May - round 14 (phase 2) ===
(best of 13 legs)

	Score	
Vítězslav Sedlák (Czech Republic); 90.70	7 – 4	(Czech Republic) Daniel Barbořák; 82.20
Adam Gawlas (Czech Republic); 89.90	7 – 0	(Czech Republic) Michal Šmejda; 82.80
David Písek (Czech Republic); 83.00	7 – 3	(Czech Republic) Ondřej Kysilka; 77.90
Alexander Mašek (Czech Republic); 95.50	7 – 1	(Czech Republic) Michal Ondo; 86.00
Night's Average: 86.00
Highest Checkout: (Czech Republic) Daniel Barbořák 156
Most 180s: (Czech Republic) Vítězslav Sedlák, (Czech Republic) Adam Gawlas, (Czech Republic) David Písek and (Czech Republic) Alexander Mašek 3
Night's 180s: 15

=== 21. May - round 15 (phase 2) ===
(best of 13 legs)

	Score	
Michal Šmejda (Czech Republic); 86.40	7 – 5	(Czech Republic) Alexander Mašek; 89.00
Daniel Barbořák (Czech Republic); 85.30	4 – 7	(Czech Republic) David Písek; 87.20
Vítězslav Sedlák (Czech Republic); 84.50	7 – 2	(Czech Republic) Michal Ondo; 73.30
Ondřej Kysilka (Czech Republic); 81.70	4 – 7	(Czech Republic) Adam Gawlas; 85.20
Night's Average: 84.08
Highest Checkout: (Czech Republic) Michal Šmejda 132
Most 180s: (Czech Republic) Alexander Mašek and (Czech Republic) David Písek 3
Night's 180s: 13

=== 27. May - round 16 (phase 2) ===
(best of 13 legs)

	Score	
Michal Ondo (Czech Republic); 70.90	2 – 7	(Czech Republic) David Písek; 82.90
Vítězslav Sedlák (Czech Republic); 89.00	7 – 5	(Czech Republic) Michal Šmejda; 77.10
Daniel Barbořák (Czech Republic); 81.20	7 – 1	(Czech Republic) Ondřej Kysilka; 71.90
Alexander Mašek (Czech Republic); 79.00	4 – 7	(Czech Republic) Adam Gawlas; 82.30
Night's Average: 79.29
Highest Checkout: (Czech Republic) Michal Šmejda 160
Most 180s: (Czech Republic) Vítězslav Sedlák 4
Night's 180s: 13

== Playoff - 28. May ==
	Score	
Semifinals (best of 19)
Adam Gawlas (Czech Republic); 81.80	8 – 10	(Czech Republic) Alexander Mašek; 81.50
Vítězslav Sedlák (Czech Republic); 86.00	10 – 4	(Czech Republic) Daniel Barbořák; 77.00
Final (best of 19)
Alexander Mašek (Czech Republic); 82.40	6 – 10	(Czech Republic) Vítězslav Sedlák; 87.00
Night's Total Average 82.62
Highest Checkout: (Czech Republic) Alexander Mašek 101
Most 180s: (Czech Republic) Vítězslav Sedlák 7
Night's 180s: 19

== Table and streaks ==
=== Table ===
After the first nine rounds in phase 1, the two bottom players in the table are eliminated. In phase 2, the eight remaining players play in a single match on each of the seven nights. The top four players then compete in the knockout semi-finals and final on the playoff night.

One point is awarded for a win, zero points for a loss. When players are tied on points, the following rules are applied:

1. Points difference (one point is awarded for a win)
2. Leg difference
3. Number of legs won against the throw
4. The highest average in a match
5. 9 darts shootout

#	Name	Pts	Matches			Legs				Statistics					
#	Name	Pts	Pld	W	L	LF	LA	+/-	LWAT	100+	140+	180s	A	HC	C%
1	(Czech Republic) Adam Gawlas Q	12	16	12	4	94	58	+36	35	188	80	25	85.14	123	34.96
2	(Czech Republic) Vítězslav Sedlák Q	11	16	11	5	93	70	+23	36	210	97	27	83.98	127	27.51
3	(Czech Republic) Daniel Barbořák Q	10	16	10	6	81	67	+14	33	169	68	14	80.73	170	32.65
4	(Czech Republic) Alexander Mašek Q	10	16	10	6	83	79	+4	31	212	117	24	82.42	101	28.42
5	(Czech Republic) David Písek E	8	16	8	8	83	72	+11	28	175	74	33	82.04	129	34.44
6	(Czech Republic) Michal Šmejda E	8	16	8	8	74	74	0	28	169	77	8	78.54	160	30.58
7	(Czech Republic) Ondřej Kysilka E	6	16	6	10	72	88	-16	31	162	85	21	78.95	145	25.71
8	(Czech Republic) Michal Ondo E	5	16	5	11	65	94	-29	24	177	58	8	76.76	132	26.21
9	(Czech Republic) Pavel Jirkal E	2	9	2	7	37	46	-9	15	121	38	3	76.08	147	28.68
10	(Czech Republic) David Rosí E	1	9	1	8	19	53	-34	8	71	22	3	68.41	120	18.81

(Q) = Qualified For The Playoffs; (E) = Eliminated From Playoff Contention

=== Streaks ===
Player	Phase 1, Rd 1 to 9									Phase 2, Rd 10 to 16							Playoff	
Player	1	2	3	4	5	6	7	8	9	10	11	12	13	14	15	16	SF	F
(Czech Republic) Adam Gawlas	W	W	W	L	L	W	W	W	L	L	W	W	W	W	W	W	L	–
(Czech Republic) Vítězslav Sedlák	W	W	L	W	L	L	W	W	L	W	L	W	W	W	W	W	W	W
(Czech Republic) Daniel Barbořák	W	L	W	W	W	W	W	W	L	W	L	L	W	L	L	W	L	–
(Czech Republic) Alexander Mašek	L	W	L	L	W	W	W	W	W	W	W	W	L	W	L	L	W	L
(Czech Republic) David Písek	W	L	W	L	W	L	L	L	W	W	L	L	L	W	W	W	–	
(Czech Republic) Michal Šmejda	W	W	L	W	L	L	W	L	L	L	W	W	W	L	W	L	–	
(Czech Republic) Ondřej Kysilka	L	W	W	L	W	W	L	L	W	L	W	L	L	L	L	L	–	
(Czech Republic) Michal Ondo	L	L	L	W	W	W	L	W	W	L	L	L	L	L	L	L	–	
(Czech Republic) Pavel Jirkal	L	L	W	L	L	L	L	L	W	–							–	
(Czech Republic) David Rosí	L	L	L	W	L	L	L	L	L	–							–	

=== Positions by Round ===
Player	Phase 1, Rd 1 to 9									Phase 2, Rd 10 to 16						
Player	1	2	3	4	5	6	7	8	9	10	11	12	13	14	15	16
(Czech Republic) Adam Gawlas	2	1	1	3	3	2	2	2	2	3	3	2	1	1	1	1
(Czech Republic) Vítězslav Sedlák	4	3	6	4	4	4	3	3	4	4	4	4	4	3	2	2
(Czech Republic) Daniel Barbořák	3	5	2	1	1	1	1	1	1	1	1	3	2	4	4	3
(Czech Republic) Alexander Mašek	9	7	8	9	8	8	6	4	3	2	2	1	3	2	3	4
(Czech Republic) David Písek	1	4	3	6	5	5	7	8	7	5	6	7	7	6	6	5
(Czech Republic) Michal Šmejda	5	2	5	2	2	6	4	5	8	8	7	5	5	5	5	6
(Czech Republic) Ondřej Kysilka	8	6	4	5	6	3	5	6	5	6	5	6	6	7	7	7
(Czech Republic) Michal Ondo	7	9	9	8	7	7	8	7	6	7	8	8	8	8	8	8
(Czech Republic) Pavel Jirkal	6	8	7	7	9	9	9	9	9	–						
(Czech Republic) David Rosí	10	10	10	10	10	10	10	10	10	–						
