= 2018 WDF Europe Cup =

WDF Europe Cup

Tournament information
- Dates: 26–29 September 2018
- Venue: MOM Center
- Location: Budapest
- Country: Hungary
- Organisation(s): WDF
- Format: Legs

Champion(s)
- Singles; Martin Heneghan (men's) (Switzerland) Fiona Gaylor (women's); Pairs; Daniel Day & Scott Mitchell (men's); Deta Hedman & Maria O'Brien (women's); Team; Sweden (men's); England (women's); Overall; England (men's); England (women's)

The 2018 WDF Europe Cup will be the 21st edition of the WDF Europe Cup organised by the World Darts Federation. The tournament will be held first time in history at the MOM Center in Budapest, Hungary. Medals were distributed in eight disciplines (singles, pairs, teams and overalls) appropriately for each of the sex. 38 nations participated in this tournament (in four cases only men's representation). England won medal tally.

== Medal tally ==
* Host nation (Hungary)

| Rank | Nation | Gold | Silver | Bronze | Total |
|---|---|---|---|---|---|
| 1 | England (ENG) | 5 | 0 | 0 | 5 |
| 2 | Ireland (IRL) | 1 | 1 | 1 | 3 |
| 3 | Sweden (SWE) | 1 | 0 | 1 | 2 |
| 4 | Switzerland (SUI) | 1 | 0 | 0 | 1 |
| 5 | Netherlands (NED) | 0 | 5 | 1 | 6 |
| 6 | Wales (WAL) | 0 | 1 | 2 | 3 |
| 7 | Czech Republic (CZE) | 0 | 1 | 1 | 2 |
| 8 | Scotland (SCO) | 0 | 0 | 3 | 3 |
| 9 | Norway (NOR) | 0 | 0 | 2 | 2 |
| 10 | Belgium (BEL) | 0 | 0 | 1 | 1 |
| 10 | Finland (FIN) | 0 | 0 | 1 | 1 |
| 10 | Germany (GER) | 0 | 0 | 1 | 1 |
| Totals (12 entries) | | 8 | 8 | 14 | 30 |

== Qualifiers ==
| Country | Men's qualifiers | Women's qualifiers |
|---|---|---|
| Austria | Aaron Hardy, Felix Losan, Philipp Mödritscher, Bastian Pietschnig | Manuela Brandstätter, Daniela Neumayer, Catalina Pasa, Kerstin Rauscher |
| Belgium | John Desreumaux, Jeffrey Van Egdom, Roger Janssen, Niels Vanbergen | Peggy van Ballaert, Carine Dessein, Kathy Geeraerts, Vanessa Reyniers |
| Bulgaria | Krasimir Ivanov, Jeff Maahs, Ivan Neykov, Miroslav Petrov | Ivanina Ivanova, Bonka Mancheva, Debora Urdeva, Plamena Urdeva |
| Catalonia | Josep Arimany, Carlos Arola, Sergio Garrido, Tony Rodriguez | Loli Cascales, Maria Gomez, Nuria Plaza, Iolanda Riba-Toharias |
| Cyprus | Demetris Georgiou, Marios Georgiou, Ermos Korradou, Louis Mouzourides | — |
| Czechia | Roman Benischko, František Humpula, Pavel Jirkal, Michal Ondo | Jitka Cisarova, Alena Gregurkova, Vladimira Tonarova, Blanka Vojtkova |
| Denmark | Mogens Christensen, Lars Helsinghof, Daniel Jensen, Nicolai Olsen | Kirsten Byo, Henriette Honore, Janni Larsen, Sandra Rasmussen |
| England | Daniel Day, Nigel Heydon, Paul Hogan, Scott Mitchell | Deta Hedman, Maria O'Brien, Lorraine Winstanley, Fallon Sherrock |
| Estonia | Jan Kapaun, Raido Kruusvee, Andres Paal, Andres Sepp | — |
| Finland | Ulf Ceder, Pauli Finnala, Marko Kantele, Asko Niskala | Sari Nikula, Kaisu Rekinen, Kirsi Viinikainen, Anna Vilen |
| France | Iain Cash, Jacques Labre, Thibault Tricole, David Triqueneaux | Carole Frison, Aude Julien, Dorothee Lemaire, Aline Tacail |
| Germany | Frank Kunze, Ricardo Pietreczko, Dominik Wigmann, Jens Ziegler | Irina Armstrong, Barbara Holst, Anne Willkomm, Lena Zollikofer |
| Gibraltar | Tony Dawkins, Dylan Duo, David Francis, Antony Lopez | — |
| Greece | George Anyfantis, John Michael, Angelos Moulangelis, Kostas Pantelidis | Marietta Chatzh, Marina Chionatou, Anastasia Pentagioti, Maria Poulidou |
| Hungary | Gabor Petracs, József Rucska, Pál Székely, Gábor Takács | Krisztina Csombok, Nora Erdei, Veronika Ihász, Annamaria Olei |
| Iceland | Vitor Charrua, Halgrímur Egilsson, Petur Gudmundsson, Thorgeir Gudmundsson | Olafia Gudmundsdottir, Petrea Fridriksdottir, Ingibjorg Magnusdottir, Gudrun Thordardottir |
| Ireland | Martin Heneghan, Michael Meaney, Shane O'Hara, John O'Shea | Robyn Byrne, Teresa Maher, Olive McIntyre, Ann Redmond |
| Isle of Man | William Biggane, Wayne Harrison, Paul Kelly, Walter McCarthy | Wendy Andrews, Nikki Bardsley, Caroline Hooton, Sarah Taylor |
| Italy | Luca Catallo, Andrea Contino, Daniele Sergi, Stefano Tomassetti | Mara Casadei, Giada Marani, Barbara Osti, Giulia Vernocchi |
| Jersey | Nathan le Bailly, Steve Eusebini, Phil Speak, Craig Quemard | Jenna Avrill, Angela le Bailly, Donna le Clercq, Ema Hawley |
| Latvia | Zanis Buklovskis, Kristaps Mickus, Aigars Strelis, Uldis Zeitmanis | Irena Bauze, Kristine Mickus, Marija Ruzane, Anda Seimane |
| Lithuania | Arūnas Čiplys, Ugnius Jankúnas, Darius Labanauskas, Tomas Sakys | Algina Juknaite, Asta Jukniene, Sandra Rimkeviciute, Renata Vaikutiene |
| Luxembourg | Daniel Amil, Tom Becker, Tom Burquel, Jim Mayer | Jessica Bintz, Sabrina Hoor, Tina Jacob-Marx, Sonny Klein-Kemp |
| Malta | John Agius, Norbert Attard, Andy Keen, Albert Scerri | Jane Baggaley-Agius, Josianne Caruana, Bev Keen, Pauline Tonna |
| Netherlands | Chris Landman, Martijn Kleermaker, Willem Mandigers, Richard Veenstra | Sharon Prins, Anca Zijlstra, Vanessa Zuidema, Femke van Zuiden |
| Northern Ireland | Gavin Carlin, Chris Gilliland, Daniel McDonald, Kyle McKinstry | Margaret Coulter, Grace Crane, Helen Dunn, Kayleigh O'Neill |
| Norway | Stig-Jarle Knudsen, Andres Rokstad, Kent Sivertsen, Kjell Vaabeno | Rachna David, Jorunn-Naess Ekren, Marta Krol, Tamara Schuur |
| Romania | Adrian Frim, László Kádár, Razyan Negot, Gabriel Pascaru | Andreea Brad, Monica Dan, Mirela Iftode, Suzana Neagu |
| Russia | Aleksei Kadochnikov, Boris Koltsov, Roman Obukhov, Aleksandr Oreshkin | Ekaterina Cherkasova, Natalia Fefilova, Marina Kononova, Tatiana Novikova |
| Scotland | Euan Callander, Ryan Hogarth, Ross Montgomery, Alan Soutar | Emily Davidson, Lorraine Hyde, Susanna McGimpsey, Chelsea McMahon |
| Serbia | Oliver Ferenc, Dejan Kovacevic, Aleksandar Milovanovic, Tihomir Patrik | Marija Bogunovic, Tamara Milic, Djurdjina Miscevic, Marija Vukadinovic |
| Slovakia | Frantisek Mika, Ľuboš Pivarč, Milan Stefanek, Vladimir Zatko | — |
| Spain | Alejandro Ameneiros, Miguel Maya, Jose Padilla, Matt Smith | Rosana Alarcon, Milagros Martinez, Mercedes de los Santos, Karen Winter |
| Sweden | Andreas Harrysson, Daniel Larsson, Oskar Lukasiak, Edwin Torbjörnsson | Anna Forsmark, Susianne Hagvall, Maud Jansson, Vicky Pruim |
| Switzerland | Tobias Anliker, Stefan Bellmont, Andy Bless, Philippe Ruckstuhl | Fiona Gaylor, Karina Nagapetynts, Jeannette Stoop, Katharina Vonrufs |
| Turkey | Erdem Butuner, Oguzhan Kaya, Alim Oktem, Alper Subasi | Sudenaz Aydin, Pelin Kosten, Rumeysa Uzun, Hatice-Sinem Sengul |
| Ukraine | Oleksii Bushui, Oleksandr Mamyka, Vladyslav Omelchenko, Artem Usyk | Svitlana Anisimova, Ganna Chumak, Olga Grushovets, Natalia Ledienova |
| Wales | Nick Kenny, Mark Layton, Arwyn Morris, Jim Williams | Rhian Griffiths, Rhian O'Sullivan, Ann-Marie Potts, Chris Savvery |

== Men's singles ==
Fourth round (best of 7 legs); 26 September
Darius Labanauskas | 4
Ryan Hogarth | 3
Oliver Ferenc | 4
Angelos Moulangelis | 0
Oleksandr Mamyka | 4
Josep Arimany | 3
Roger Janssen | 4
Scott Mitchell | 2
Thibault Tricole | 4
Nick Kenny | 2
Martin Heneghan | 4
Euan Callander | 1
Kostas Pantelidis | 4
Oleksii Bushui | 1
Paul Hogan | 4
Richard Veenstra | 2
Pavel Jirkal | 4
Gavin Carlin | 3
Daniel Day | 4
Tom Burquel | 2
Ross Montgomery | 4
Ricardo Pietreczko | 3
John O'Shea | 4
Arwyn Morris | 0
Alan Soutar | 4
Chris Gilliland | 1
Ulf Ceder | 4
Martijn Kleermaker | 1
Michael Meaney | 4
Nicolai Olsen | 0
Nigel Heydon | 4
Jim Williams | 3

Fifth round (best of 7 legs); 26 September
Darius Labanauskas | 4
Oliver Ferenc | 1
Oleksandr Mamyka | 3
Roger Janssen | 4
Thibault Tricole | 1
Martin Heneghan | 4
Kostas Pantelidis | 2
Paul Hogan | 4
Pavel Jirkal | 4
Daniel Day | 1
Ross Montgomery | 2
John O'Shea | 4
Alan Soutar | 4
Ulf Ceder | 2
Michael Meaney | 0
Nigel Heydon | 4

Quarter-finals (best of 9 legs); 26 September
Darius Labanauskas | 3
Roger Janssen | 5
Martin Heneghan | 5
Paul Hogan | 1
Pavel Jirkal | 5
John O'Shea | 3
Alan Soutar | 5
Nigel Heydon | 1

Semi-finals (best of 11 legs); 26 September
Roger Janssen | 2
Martin Heneghan | 6
Pavel Jirkal | 6
Alan Soutar | 4

Final (best of 13 legs); 26 September
Martin Heneghan 79.72 | 7
Pavel Jirkal 76.79 | 2

== Women's singles ==
Fourth round (best of 7 legs); 26 September
Robyn Byrne | 4
Deta Hedman | 2
Rhian Griffiths | 4
Tamara Schuur | 0
Catalina Pasa | 4
Lorraine Hyde | 0
Ekaterina Cherkasova | 4
Vicky Pruim | 3
Carine Dessein | 4
Irina Armstrong | 2
Maria O'Brien | 4
Kaisu Rekinen | 3
Katharina Vonrufs | 4
Rosana Alarcon | 1
Femke van Zuiden | 4
Veronika Ihász | 0
Rachna David | 4
Karina Nagapetynts | 2
Marina Kononova | 4
Kristine Mickus | 0
Lorraine Winstanley | 4
Henriette Honore | 0
Rhian O'Sullivan | 4
Anca Zijlstra | 2
Milagros Martinez | 4
Hatice-Sinem Sengul | 3
Fiona Gaylor | 4
Vladimira Tonarova | 0
Fallon Sherrock | 4
Plamena Urdeva | 1
Anne Willkomm | 4
Sharon Prins | 3

Fifth round (best of 7 legs); 26 September
Robyn Byrne | 4
Rhian Griffiths | 3
Catalina Pasa | 2
Ekaterina Cherkasova | 4
Carine Dessein | 2
Maria O'Brien | 4
Katharina Vonrufs | 3
Femke van Zuiden | 4
Rachna David | 4
Marina Kononova | 3
Lorraine Winstanley | 4
Rhian O'Sullivan | 3
Milagros Martinez | 1
Fiona Gaylor | 4
Fallon Sherrock | 4
Anne Willkomm | 1

Quarter-finals (best of 9 legs); 26 September
Robyn Byrne | 5
Ekaterina Cherkasova | 3
Maria O'Brien | 1
Femke van Zuiden | 5
Rachna David | 5
Lorraine Winstanley | 3
Fiona Gaylor | 5
Fallon Sherrock | 3

Semi-finals (best of 11 legs); 26 September
Robyn Byrne | 6
Femke van Zuiden | 5
Rachna David | 3
Fiona Gaylor | 6

Final (best of 13 legs); 26 September
Robyn Byrne 63.01 | 4
Fiona Gaylor 67.79 | 7

== Men's Pairs ==
Semi-finals (best of 9 legs); 27 September
Czech Republic; Pavel Jirkal, Michal Ondo | 0
England; Daniel Day, Scott Mitchell | 5
Scotland; Ross Montgomery, Alan Soutar | 3
Netherlands; Martijn Kleermaker, Chris Landman | 5

Final (best of 11 legs); 27 September
England; Daniel Day, Scott Mitchell | 6
Netherlands; Martijn Kleermaker, Chris Landman | 3

== Women's Pairs ==
Semi-finals (best of 9 legs); 27 September
Wales; Rhian Griffiths, Rhian O'Sullivan | 1
England; Deta Hedman, Maria O'Brien | 5
England; Fallon Sherrock, Lorraine Winstanley | 5
Germany; Irina Armstrong, Anne Willkomm | 1

Final (best of 11 legs); 27 September
England; Deta Hedman, Maria O'Brien | 6
England; Fallon Sherrock, Lorraine Winstanley | 5
