= 2023 Austrian Darts Open =

2023 Interwetten Austrian Darts Open

Tournament information
- Dates: 21-23 April 2023
- Venue: Premstättner Halle
- Location: Graz, Austria
- Organisation(s): Professional Darts Corporation (PDC)
- Format: Legs
- Prize fund: £175,000
- Winner's share: £30,000
- High checkout: 170 Cameron Menzies

Champion(s)
- Jonny Clayton (WAL)

The 2023 Austrian Darts Open, known as the 2023 Interwetten Austrian Darts Open for sponsorship reasons, was a professional darts tournament that took place at the Premstättner Halle in Graz, Austria, from 21 to 23 April 2023. It was the fifth of thirteen European Tour events on the 2023 PDC Pro Tour. It featured a field of 48 players and £175,000 in prize money, with £30,000 going to the winner.

Michael van Gerwen was the defending champion after defeating Danny Noppert 8–5 in the 2022 final. Van Gerwen was defeated 7–0 by Josh Rock in the semi-finals.

Jonny Clayton won his second European Tour title after defeating Josh Rock 8–6 in the final.

== Prize money ==
The prize money was increased for the first time in 4 years for all European Tours:

Stage (num. of players)		Prize money
Winner	(1)	£30,000
Runner-up	(1)	£12,000
Semi-finalists	(2)	£8,500
Quarter-finalists	(4)	£6,000
Third round losers	(8)	£4,000
Second round losers	(16)	£2,500*
First round losers	(16)	£1,250
Total	£175,000	

- Seeded players who lost in the second round of the event were not credited with prize money on any Order of Merit. A player who qualified as a qualifier, but later became a seed due to the withdrawal of one or more other players was credited with their prize money on all Orders of Merit regardless of how far they progressed in the event.

== Qualification and format ==
The top 16 entrants from the PDC Pro Tour Order of Merit on 7 March 2023 automatically qualified for the event and were seeded into the second round.

The remaining 32 places went on to qualifiers from six qualifying events – 24 from the Tour Card Holder Qualifier (held on 13 March), from the Associate Member Qualifier (held on 12 February), the two highest ranked Austrians automatically qualified, alongside two from the Host Nation Qualifier (held on 20 April), one from the Nordic & Baltic Associate Member Qualifier (held on 10 March), and one from the East European Associate Member Qualifier (held on 15 April).

Jim Williams withdrew from the tournament for personal reasons, and was replaced by Stephen Bunting, who was top of the reserve list.

The following players took part in the tournament:

Top 16

1. Luke Humphries (second round)
2. Dave Chisnall (second round)
3. Michael van Gerwen (semi-finals)
4. Damon Heta (third round)
5. Dirk van Duijvenbode (third round)
6. Rob Cross (third round)
7. Michael Smith (third round)
8. Nathan Aspinall (third round)
9. Danny Noppert (quarter-finals)
10. Peter Wright (second round)
11. Ryan Searle (quarter-finals)
12. Joe Cullen (quarter-finals)
13. Jonny Clayton (champion)
14. Martin Schindler (second round)
15. Josh Rock (runner-up)
16. Andrew Gilding (third round)

Tour Card Qualifier
- William O'Connor (first round)
- Ian White (first round)
- Cameron Menzies (first round)
- Maik Kuivenhoven (second round)
- Bradley Brooks (first round)
- Ricky Evans (first round)
- Daryl Gurney (semi-finals)
- Owen Roelofs (first round)
- Simon Whitlock (third round)
- Madars Razma (first round)
- Dylan Slevin (first round)
- Ricardo Pietreczko (second round)
- Nick Kenny (second round)
- Krzysztof Ratajski (second round)
- Jeffrey de Zwaan (first round)
- Chris Dobey (second round)
- Matt Campbell (second round)
- Kim Huybrechts (first round)
- Ryan Meikle (second round)
- Luke Woodhouse (second round)
- Raymond van Barneveld (second round)
- Brendan Dolan (first round)
- Mickey Mansell (third round)

Associate Member Qualifier
- Jelle Klaasen (second round)
- John Henderson (second round)

Highest ranking Austrians
- Rowby-John Rodriguez (first round)
- Mensur Suljović (quarter-finals)

Host Nation Qualifier
- Marcus Haider (first round)
- Hannes Schnier (second round)

Nordic & Baltic Qualifier
- Dmitrijs Žukovs (first round)

East European Qualifier
- Vítězslav Sedlák (first round)

Reserve List Qualifier
- Stephen Bunting (first round)

== Draw ==
The draw was confirmed on 20 April.

First round (best of 11 legs); 21 April
Daryl Gurney 90.04	6
Alt	Stephen Bunting 95.80	3
Matt Campbell 94.79	6
Ian White 91.12	5
Jeffrey de Zwaan 87.82	5
Hannes Schnier 82.97	6
Vítězslav Sedlák 90.84	3
Chris Dobey 100.93	6
Marcus Haider 81.75	3
Luke Woodhouse 82.74	6
William O'Connor 93.11	5
Jelle Klaasen 96.19	6
Ryan Meikle 92.41	6
Rowby-John Rodriguez 89.94	3
Nick Kenny 87.79	6
Madars Razma 90.16	4
Dmitrijs Žukovs 82.47	1
Mickey Mansell 94.03	6
Owen Roelofs 92.19	2
Krzysztof Ratajski 92.95	6
Cameron Menzies 98.57	4
Ricardo Pietreczko 95.34	6
Ricky Evans 88.08	4
Mensur Suljović 85.34	6
John Henderson 96.22	6
Dylan Slevin 92.06	4
Kim Huybrechts 89.87	4
Simon Whitlock 87.35	6
Maik Kuivenhoven 87.99	6
Bradley Brooks 88.41	5
Brendan Dolan 86.65	3
Raymond van Barneveld 88.01	6

Second round (best of 11 legs); 22 April
1	Luke Humphries 88.22	1
Daryl Gurney 87.29	6
16	Andrew Gilding 93.12	6
Matt Campbell 92.94	4
8	Nathan Aspinall 84.09	6
Hannes Schnier 73.32	2
9	Danny Noppert 95.81	6
Chris Dobey 91.55	4
4	Damon Heta 94.48	6
Luke Woodhouse 90.02	4
13	Jonny Clayton 93.69	6
Jelle Klaasen 88.19	5
5	Dirk van Duijvenbode 98.96	6
Ryan Meikle 89.49	4
12	Joe Cullen 102.81	6
Nick Kenny 91.73	2
2	Dave Chisnall 94.93	2
Mickey Mansell 100.38	6
15	Josh Rock 100.11	6
Krzysztof Ratajski 90.35	2
7	Michael Smith 90.55	6
Ricardo Pietreczko 88.85	5
10	Peter Wright 78.00	1
Mensur Suljović 76.50	6
3	Michael van Gerwen 96.64	6
John Henderson 86.48	4
14	Martin Schindler 93.70	5
Simon Whitlock 97.92	6
6	Rob Cross 95.70	6
Maik Kuivenhoven 73.86	2
11	Ryan Searle 88.27	6
Raymond van Barneveld 89.19	5

Third round (best of 11 legs); 23 April
Daryl Gurney 93.91	6
16	Andrew Gilding 92.76	4
8	Nathan Aspinall 95.08	5
9	Danny Noppert 85.51	6
4	Damon Heta 98.19	4
13	Jonny Clayton 105.89	6
5	Dirk van Duijvenbode 107.44	2
12	Joe Cullen 107.46	6
Mickey Mansell 92.89	5
15	Josh Rock 93.59	6
7	Michael Smith 96.56	2
Mensur Suljović 97.18	6
3	Michael van Gerwen 92.00	6
Simon Whitlock 88.57	2
6	Rob Cross 98.80	3
11	Ryan Searle 103.35	6

Quarter-finals (best of 11 legs); 23 April
Daryl Gurney 95.47	6
9	Danny Noppert 79.49	1
13	Jonny Clayton 94.91	6
12	Joe Cullen 96.02	3
15	Josh Rock 90.94	6
Mensur Suljović 89.37	4
3	Michael van Gerwen 100.98	6
11	Ryan Searle 92.79	1

Semi-finals (best of 13 legs); 23 April
Daryl Gurney 92.95	6
13	Jonny Clayton 92.86	7
15	Josh Rock 95.65	7
3	Michael van Gerwen 87.11	0

Final (best of 15 legs); 23 April
13	Jonny Clayton 101.36	8
15	Josh Rock 101.47	6
