= 2023 European Darts Matchplay =

2023 edition of European Darts Matchplay

2023 Interwetten European Darts Matchplay

Tournament information
- Dates: 30 June–2 July 2023
- Venue: Trier Arena
- Location: Trier, Germany
- Organisation(s): Professional Darts Corporation (PDC)
- Format: Legs
- Prize fund: £175,000
- Winner's share: £30,000
- High checkout: 170 Raymond van Barneveld

Champion(s)
- Luke Humphries

The 2023 Interwetten European Darts Matchplay was the tenth of thirteen PDC European Tour events on the 2023 PDC Pro Tour. The tournament took place at the Trier Arena, Trier, Germany from 30 June–2 July 2023. It featured a field of 48 players and £175,000 in prize money, with £30,000 going to the winner.

The defending champion was Luke Humphries, who defeated Rowby-John Rodriguez 8–7 in the 2022 final.

Humphries successfully defended his title after defeating Dirk van Duijvenbode 8–7 in the final, with van Duijvenbode missing four match darts. This was Humphries' fifth European Tour title.

== Prize money ==
The prize money was increased for the first time in 4 years for all European Tours:

Stage (num. of players)		Prize money
Winner	(1)	£30,000
Runner-up	(1)	£12,000
Semi-finalists	(2)	£8,000
Quarter-finalists	(4)	£6,000
Third round losers	(8)	£4,000
Second round losers	(16)	£2,500*
First round losers	(16)	£1,250
Total	£175,000	

- Seeded players who lose in the second round of the event shall not be credited with prize money on any Order of Merit. A player who qualifies as a qualifier, but later becomes a seed due to the withdrawal of one or more other players shall be credited with their prize money on all Orders of Merit regardless of how far they progress in the event.

== Qualification and format ==
The top 16 entrants from the PDC ProTour Order of Merit on 4 April 2023 automatically qualified for the event and were seeded in the second round.

The remaining 32 places went to players from six qualifying events – 24 from the Tour Card Holder Qualifier (held on 17 April), two from the Associate Member Qualifier (held on 20 May), the two highest ranked Germans automatically qualified, alongside two from the Host Nation Qualifier (held on 20 May), one from the Nordic & Baltic Associate Member Qualifier (held on 2 June), and one from the East European Associate Member Qualifier (held on 3 June).

The following players took part in the tournament:

Top 16

1. Luke Humphries (champion)
2. Dirk van Duijvenbode (runner-up)
3. Dave Chisnall (second round)
4. Damon Heta (second round)
5. Rob Cross (third round)
6. Michael van Gerwen (second round)
7. Michael Smith (quarter-finals)
8. Nathan Aspinall (quarter-finals)
9. Danny Noppert (third round)
10. Josh Rock (third round)
11. Ryan Searle (third round)
12. Jonny Clayton (second round)
13. Martin Schindler (third round)
14. Joe Cullen (semi-finals)
15. Dimitri Van den Bergh (third round)
16. Ross Smith (second round)

Tour Card Qualifier
- George Killington (first round)
- Stephen Burton (first round)
- Daniel Klose (first round)
- Luke Woodhouse (first round)
- José de Sousa (first round)
- Simon Whitlock (first round)
- Raymond van Barneveld (quarter-finals)
- Stephen Bunting (third round)
- Connor Scutt (first round)
- Brendan Dolan (second round)
- Ted Evetts (first round)
- James Wade (semi-finals)
- Keane Barry (second round)
- Gian van Veen (quarter-finals)
- Graham Hall (first round)
- Ryan Joyce (third round)
- Kim Huybrechts (first round)
- James Wilson (second round)
- Martin Lukeman (second round)
- William O'Connor (first round)
- Mickey Mansell (second round)
- Matt Campbell (first round)

Associate Member Qualifier
- Christian Kist (first round)
- Darryl Pilgrim (first round)

Highest Ranking Germans
- Gabriel Clemens (second round)
- Ricardo Pietreczko (second round)

Host Nation Qualifier
- Fabian Herz (first round)
- (Germany) Liam Maendl-Lawrance (first round)

Nordic & Baltic Qualifier
- Marko Kantele (second round)

East European Qualifier
- Vítězslav Sedlák (second round)

Reserve List Qualifiers
- Andrew Gilding (second round)
- Callan Rydz (second round)

== Draw ==
First round (best of 11 legs); 30 June
Liam Maendl-Lawrance 71.43	2
Marko Kantele 71.85	6
Luke Woodhouse 87.34	3
Stephen Bunting 93.44	6
Graham Hall 83.93	4
Martin Lukeman 88.04	6
Simon Whitlock 90.62	2
James Wilson 92.93	6
Gian van Veen 103.92	6
Christian Kist 99.18	3
Stephen Burton 89.26	3
Callan Rydz 94.44	6
Mickey Mansell 95.41	6
Matt Campbell 92.95	3
William O'Connor 83.65	1
James Wade 101.56	6
Darryl Pilgrim 92.90	4
Andrew Gilding 91.17	6
Fabian Herz 77.67	0
Ricardo Pietreczko 90.18	6
Kim Huybrechts 95.33	2
Keane Barry 97.00	6
Connor Scutt 90.00	2
Brendan Dolan 90.67	6
Ryan Joyce 94.98	6
Ted Evetts 92.91	1
Daniel Klose 91.77	3
Vítězslav Sedlák 102.37	6
George Killington 87.59	3
Raymond van Barneveld 89.96	6
José de Sousa 90.51	3
Gabriel Clemens 96.16	6

Second round (best of 11 legs); 1 July
1	Luke Humphries 96.72	6
Marko Kantele 89.48	1
16	Ross Smith 96.18	5
Stephen Bunting 96.06	6
8	Nathan Aspinall 103.49	6
Martin Lukeman 92.47	5
9	Danny Noppert 97.93	6
James Wilson 92.69	5
4	Damon Heta 103.96	0
Gian van Veen 114.15	6
13	Martin Schindler 96.36	6
Callan Rydz 90.13	3
5	Rob Cross 96.23	6
Mickey Mansell 96.86	4
12	Jonny Clayton 106.09	3
James Wade 107.37	6
2	Dirk van Duijvenbode 100.67	6
Andrew Gilding 96.33	2
15	Dimitri Van den Bergh 99.34	6
Ricardo Pietreczko 86.54	3
7	Michael Smith 101.10	6
Keane Barry 100.69	2
10	Josh Rock 107.36	6
Brendan Dolan 96.39	0
3	Dave Chisnall 99.77	3
Ryan Joyce 91.09	6
14	Joe Cullen 100.54	6
Vítězslav Sedlák 93.40	3
6	Michael van Gerwen 91.57	3
Raymond van Barneveld 91.95	6
11	Ryan Searle 90.56	6
Gabriel Clemens 85.27	5

Third round (best of 11 legs); 2 July
1	Humphries 109.00	6
Bunting 95.87	3
8	Aspinall 100.16	6
9	Noppert 103.41	3
Van Veen 101.40	6
13	Schindler 94.70	2
5	Cross 92.55	2
Wade 97.29	6
2	van Duijvenbode 107.36	6
15	Van den Bergh 91.19	0
7	Smith 111.33	6
10	Rock 101.70	4
Joyce 90.12	4
14	Cullen 94.66	6
van Barneveld 100.89	6
11	Searle 97.03	5

Quarter-finals (best of 11 legs); 2 July
1	Humphries 109.50	6
8	Aspinall 91.49	2
Van Veen 90.77	3
Wade 96.96	6
2	van Duijvenbode 95.31	6
7	Smith 92.96	4
14	Cullen 92.54	6
van Barneveld 89.18	4

Semi-finals (best of 13 legs); 2 July
1	Humphries 105.57	7
Wade 109.12	5
2	van Duijvenbode 93.26	7
14	Cullen 93.39	6

Final (best of 15 legs); 2 July
1	Humphries 93.27	8
2	van Duijvenbode 91.06	7
