= 2024 German Darts Grand Prix =

2024 NEO.bet German Darts Grand Prix

Tournament information
- Dates: 30 March–1 April 2024
- Venue: Kulturhalle Zenith
- Location: Munich, Germany
- Organisation(s): Professional Darts Corporation (PDC)
- Format: Legs
- Prize fund: £175,000
- Winner's share: £30,000
- High checkout: 170; Chris Dobey; Luke Humphries (x2); Dave Chisnall

Champion(s)
- Luke Humphries

The 2024 German Darts Grand Prix, known as the 2024 NEO.bet German Darts Grand Prix for sponsorship reasons, was a professional darts tournament that took place at the Kulturhalle Zenith in Munich, Germany from 30 March–1 April 2024. It was the second of thirteen European Tour events on the 2024 PDC Pro Tour. It featured a field of 48 players and £175,000 in prize money, with £30,000 going to the winner.

Michael Smith was the defending champion after defeating Nathan Aspinall 8–5 in the 2023 final. However, he lost 6–4 to Josh Rock in the third round.

Luke Humphries won the German Darts Grand Prix for the second time, his sixth European Tour title in all, beating Michael van Gerwen 8–1 in the final.

== Prize money ==
The prize fund remained at £175,000, with £30,000 to the winner:

Stage (num. of players)		Prize money
Winner	(1)	£30,000
Runner-up	(1)	£12,000
Semi-finalists	(2)	£8,500
Quarter-finalists	(4)	£6,000
Third round losers	(8)	£4,000
Second round losers	(16)	£2,500*
First round losers	(16)	£1,250*
Total	£175,000	

- Pre-qualified players from the Orders of Merit who lose in their first match of the event shall not be credited with prize money on any Order of Merit. A player who qualifies as a qualifier, but later becomes a seed due to the withdrawal of one or more other players shall be credited with their prize money on all Orders of Merit regardless of how far they progress in the event.

== Qualification and format ==
A massive overhaul in the qualification for the 2024 European Tour events was announced on 7 January.

For the first time, both the PDC Order of Merit and the PDC Pro Tour Order of Merit rankings were used to determine 32 of the 48 entrants for the event. The top 16 on the PDC Order of Merit qualified, along with the highest 16 ranked players on the PDC ProTour Order of Merit (after the PDC Order of Merit players were removed). From those 32 players, the 16 highest ranked players on the PDC ProTour Order of Merit were seeded for the event. The seedings were confirmed on 6 February.

The remaining 16 places went to players from four qualifying events – 10 from the Tour Card Holder Qualifier (held on 14 February), four from the Host Nation Qualifier (held on 17 February), one from the Nordic & Baltic Associate Member Qualifier (held on 16 February), and one from the East European Associate Member Qualifier (held on 10 February).

Gary Anderson withdrew through injury and was replaced by Luke Woodhouse. Stephen Bunting moved up to become the 16th seed.

The following players took part in the tournament:

Seeded Players

1. Dave Chisnall (third round)
2. Luke Humphries (champion)
3. Gerwyn Price (semi-finals)
4. Damon Heta (second round)
5. Dirk van Duijvenbode (second round)
6. Josh Rock (quarter-finals)
7. Rob Cross (third round)
8. Michael van Gerwen (runner-up)
9. Jonny Clayton (second round)
10. Danny Noppert (quarter-finals)
11. Michael Smith (third round)
12. Ross Smith (third round)
13. Krzysztof Ratajski (second round)
14. Ryan Searle (third round)
15. Ricardo Pietreczko (second round)
16. Stephen Bunting (second round)

Order of Merit Qualifiers
- Nathan Aspinall (quarter-finals)
- Peter Wright (second round)
- Joe Cullen (third round)
- Dimitri Van den Bergh (second round)
- Chris Dobey (third round)
- Martin Schindler (semi-finals)
- Andrew Gilding (first round)
- Daryl Gurney (second round)
- James Wade (first round)
- Gian van Veen (second round)
- Ryan Joyce (third round)
- Gabriel Clemens (first round)
- José de Sousa (first round)
- Brendan Dolan (second round)
- Raymond van Barneveld (first round)

Tour Card Qualifier
- Mike De Decker (first round)
- Alan Soutar (first round)
- Steve Lennon (second round)
- Jeffrey de Zwaan (second round)
- Niels Zonneveld (first round)
- Lukas Wenig (first round)
- Richard Veenstra (second round)
- Kevin Doets (first round)
- Jermaine Wattimena (quarter-finals)
- Cameron Menzies (second round)

Host Nation Qualifier
- Oliver Mueller (first round)
- Michael Unterbuchner (first round)
- Matthias Ehlers (first round)
- Franz Rötzsch (first round)

Nordic & Baltic Qualifier
- Viktor Tingström (first round)

East European Qualifier
- Vítězslav Sedlák (first round)

Reserve
- Luke Woodhouse (second round)

== Draw ==
Numbers to the left of players' names show the seedings for the top 16 in the tournament. The sole reserve is indicated by (Alt). The figures to the right of a player's name state their three-dart average in a match. Players in bold denote match winners.

**First round** (best of 11 legs); 30 March
**Dimitri Van den Bergh 100.69**	**6**
Gabriel Clemens 91.78	5
Franz Rötzsch 76.53	0
**Jermaine Wattimena 85.89**	**6**
**Jeffrey de Zwaan 86.69**	**6**
Matthias Ehlers 81.30	5
Andrew Gilding 89.74	2
**Joe Cullen 99.62**	**6**
**Martin Schindler 92.04**	**6**
Vítězslav Sedlák 74.97	1
**Chris Dobey 103.42**	**6**
Viktor Tingström 85.05	2
**Nathan Aspinall 92.29**	**6**
Michael Unterbuchner 87.34	2
**Brendan Dolan 94.26**	**6**
Alan Soutar 83.49	2
Niels Zonneveld 90.36	5
**Alt**	**Luke Woodhouse 94.93**	**6**
**Ryan Joyce 95.40**	**6**
Kevin Doets 94.29	4
James Wade 87.95	3
**Daryl Gurney 97.19**	**6**
Raymond van Barneveld 94.98	5
**Gian van Veen 96.65**	**6**
**Peter Wright 103.94**	**6**
José de Sousa 96.02	3
Lukas Wenig 86.30	3
**Steve Lennon 86.49**	**6**
Oliver Mueller 87.32	3
**Richard Veenstra 87.74**	**6**
**Cameron Menzies 98.16**	**6**
Mike De Decker 96.57	4

**Second round** (best of 11 legs); 31 March
**1**	**Dave Chisnall 90.37**	**6**
Dimitri Van den Bergh 84.31	4
16	Stephen Bunting 91.05	2
**Jermaine Wattimena 91.88**	**6**
**8**	**Michael van Gerwen 97.97**	**6**
Jeffrey de Zwaan 83.08	4
9	Jonny Clayton 94.21	3
**Joe Cullen 96.05**	**6**
4	Damon Heta 91.63	1
**Martin Schindler 99.29**	**6**
13	Krzysztof Ratajski 91.98	4
**Chris Dobey 92.05**	**6**
5	Dirk van Duijvenbode 94.17	4
**Nathan Aspinall 98.04**	**6**
**12**	**Ross Smith 93.51**	**6**
Brendan Dolan 87.34	1
**2**	**Luke Humphries 108.68**	**6**
Alt	Luke Woodhouse 99.40	3
15	Ricardo Pietreczko 89.78	1
**Ryan Joyce 102.88**	**6**
**7**	**Rob Cross 96.71**	**6**
Daryl Gurney 90.64	2
**10**	**Danny Noppert 104.61**	**6**
Gian van Veen 108.51	5
**3**	**Gerwyn Price 100.24**	**6**
Peter Wright 91.56	4
**14**	**Ryan Searle 90.55**	**6**
Steve Lennon 80.50	2
**6**	**Josh Rock 94.36**	**6**
Richard Veenstra 88.75	5
**11**	**Michael Smith 102.15**	**6**
Cameron Menzies 99.99	4

**Third round** (best of 11 legs); 1 April
1	Chisnall 94.50	5
**Wattimena 95.33**	**6**
**8**	**van Gerwen 102.48**	**6**
Cullen 83.93	0
**Schindler 98.01**	**6**
Dobey 95.37	4
**Aspinall 102.78**	**6**
12	R. Smith 97.06	2
**2**	**Humphries 111.63**	**6**
Joyce 102.40	2
7	Cross 91.81	2
**10**	**Noppert 100.23**	**6**
**3**	**Price 112.73**	**6**
14	Searle 96.42	0
**6**	**Rock 91.91**	**6**
11	M. Smith 95.36	4

**Quarter-finals** (best of 11 legs); 1 April
Wattimena 95.36	2
**8**	**van Gerwen 95.37**	**6**
**Schindler 100.83**	**6**
Aspinall 93.99	4
**2**	**Humphries 106.94**	**6**
10	Noppert 106.44	2
**3**	**Price 101.05**	**6**
6	Rock 99.99	5

**Semi-finals** (best of 13 legs); 1 April
**8**	**van Gerwen 101.00**	**7**
Schindler 96.63	2
**2**	**Humphries 99.93**	**7**
3	Price 92.32	3

**Final** (best of 15 legs); 1 April
8	van Gerwen 96.80	1
**2**	**Humphries 112.66**	**8**
