= Zderaz (Chrudim District) =

Municipality in the Czech Republic

- Municipality
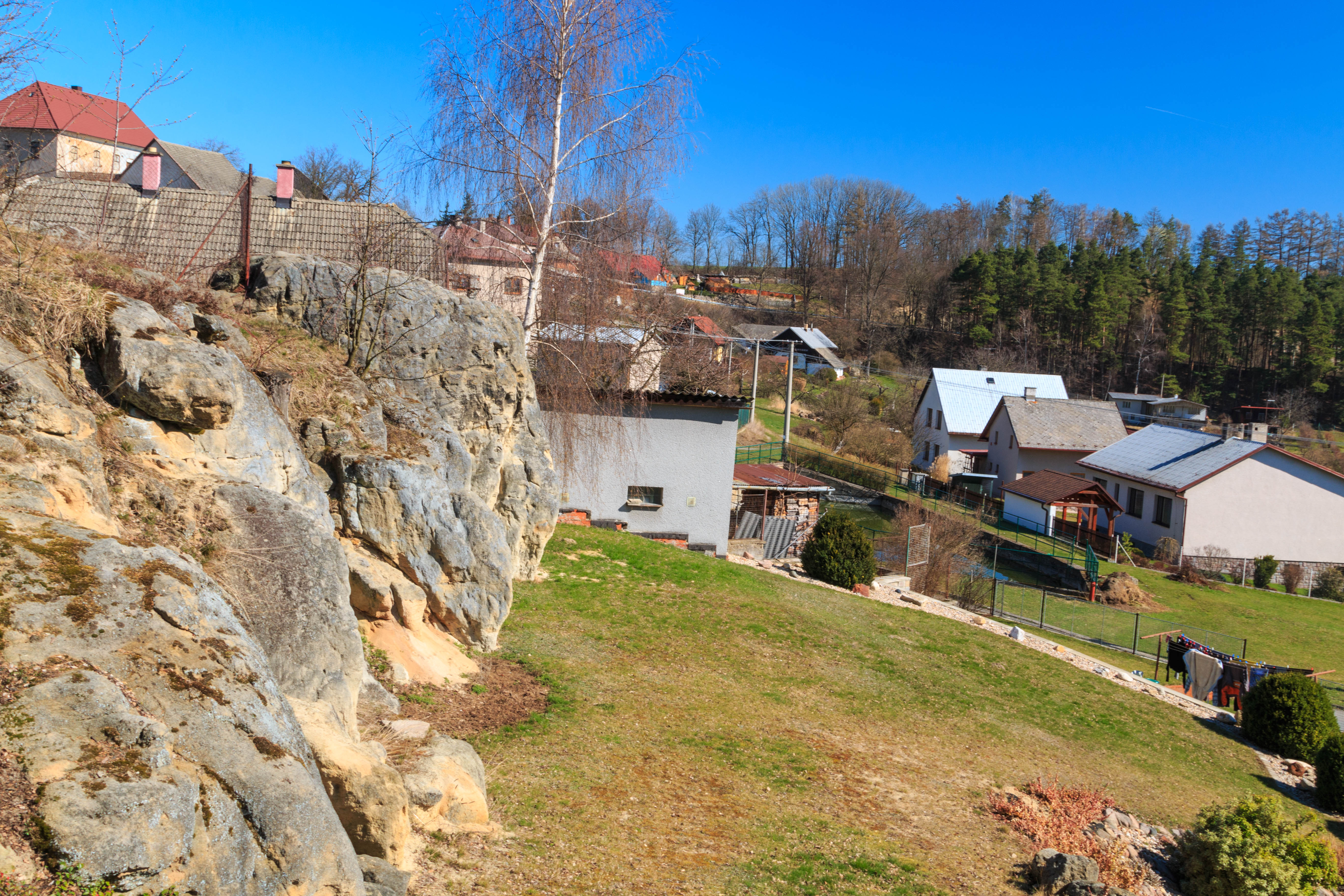
- Houses in Zderaz

- Flag Coat of arms

- Location in the Czech Republic
- Coordinates: 49°49′43″N 16°6′0″E
- Country: Czech Republic
- Region: Pardubice
- District: Chrudim
- First mentioned: 1563

Area
  - Total: 6.61 km^{2} (2.55 sq mi)
- Elevation: 478 m (1,568 ft)

Population (2026-01-01)
  - Total: 278
  - Density: 42.1/km^{2} (109/sq mi)
- Time zone: UTC+1 (CET)
  - Summer (DST): UTC+2 (CEST)
- Postal code: 539 44
- Website: www.obeczderaz.cz

Zderaz is a municipality and village in Chrudim District in the Pardubice Region of the Czech Republic. It has about 300 inhabitants.

== Demographics ==
Historical population
Year	Pop.	±%
1869	570	—
1880	594	+4.2%
1890	570	−4.0%
1900	585	+2.6%
1910	518	−11.5%
1921	476	−8.1%
1930	466	−2.1%
1950	359	−23.0%
1961	389	+8.4%
1970	335	−13.9%
1980	288	−14.0%
1991	315	+9.4%
2001	297	−5.7%
2011	276	−7.1%
2021	265	−4.0%
Source: Censuses
