= Adam Gawlas =

Czech darts player (born 2002)

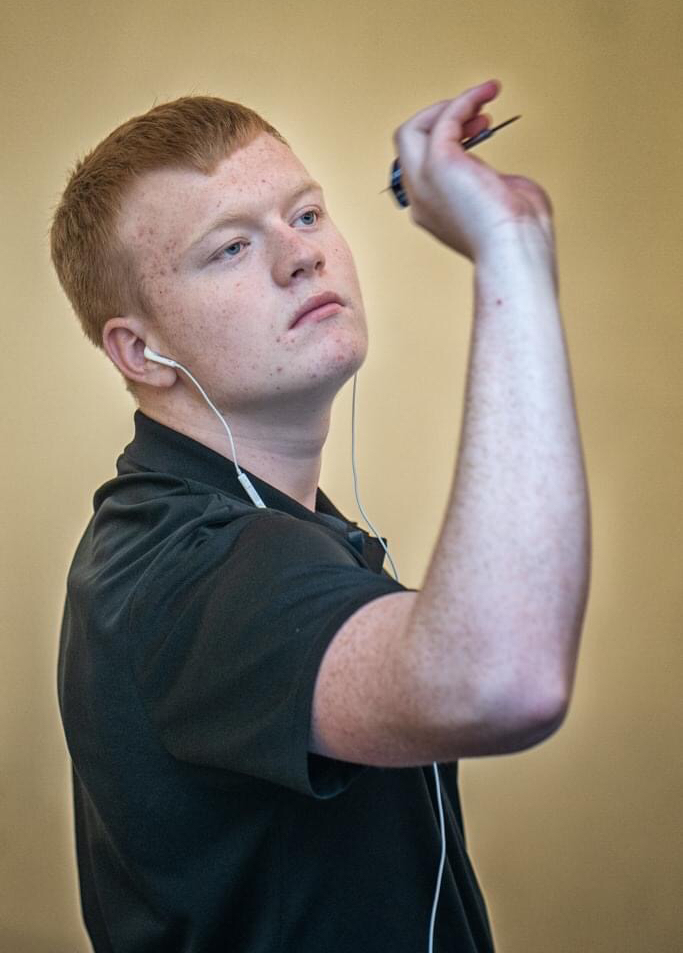
- Gawlas in 2020

Personal information
- Nickname: "Flawlas"
- Born: 18 February 2002 (age 24) Třinec, Czech Republic
- Home town: Návsí, Czech Republic

Sport
- Sport: Darts
- Playing since: 2019
- Darts: 21g Bull's NL Signature
- Laterality: Right-handed
- Walk-on music: "Return of the Tres" by Delinquent Habits

Organisation (see split in darts)
- PDC: 2019–present (Tour Card: 2021–2024; 2026–present)
- Current world ranking: (PDC) 98 ▼1 (5 November 2026)

PDC premier events – best performances
- World Championship: Last 64: 2023
- UK Open: Semi-final: 2023
- Grand Slam: Group Stage: 2020, 2022
- European Championship: Last 16: 2021

Other tournament wins
- Years
PDC Development Tour	2023, 2026
MODUS Super Series Weekly Winner	2025

Adam Gawlas (born 18 February 2002) is a Czech professional darts player who competes in Professional Darts Corporation (PDC) events. He has qualified for two PDC World Championships and reached his first major PDC semi-final at the 2023 UK Open.

In youth darts, Gawlas has won two PDC Development Tour titles and finished as the runner-up at the 2019 PDC World Youth Championship.

== Career ==
Gawlas qualified for his first PDC European Tour tournament in mid-2019, when he qualified for the 2019 Austrian Darts Championship, and he defeated Ross Smith in the first round, before losing to eventual champion Mensur Suljović in the second round.

He finished third in the JDC World Cup with the Czech junior team. Gawlas also achieved another third-place finish with the Czech junior team, this time the European Youth Cup.

He then made it to the 2019 JDC World Championship final, where he lost to Keane Barry 5–3.

Gawlas also played in the final of the 2019 PDC World Youth Championship, but he lost to Luke Humphries 6–0. The result qualified him for 2020 Grand Slam of Darts.

In early 2020 he made his first attempt at the European Q-School. In the final tournament he achieved his best result of the week when he made it into the last 32; in the other 3 events, he finished in the last 512, the last 256 and the last 128. A few weeks later he qualified for The 2020 Austrian Darts Championship, although the tournament has been postponed due to the coronavirus outbreak. In April 2020 he became one of the ten players of newly found 2020 Tipsport Premier League.

Gawlas won a PDC Tour Card for the first time at European Qualifying School in February 2021.

On 17 December 2022 he became the first Czech player in history to reach second round at PDC World Darts Championship beating Richie Burnett 3–2 in the first round.

In 2023, Gawlas was the first Czech player to reach the semi-finals at the UK Open. However, he lost this game to Andrew Gilding.

Gawlas lost his tour card in January 2025 after finishing outside the top 64 on the order of merit.

Gawlas regained his tour card at Q-School in January 2026.

== World Championship results ==
=== PDC ===
- 2023: Second round (lost to Ryan Searle 0–3)
- 2026: First round (lost to Gerwyn Price 0–3)

== Performance timeline ==
Adam Gawlas' performance timeline is as follows:

Tournament	2019	2020	2021	2022	2023	2024	2025	2026
PDC Ranked televised events
World Championship	Did not qualify				2R	DNQ		1R
UK Open	DNP		1R	4R	SF	4R	DNQ	3R
European Championship	DNQ		2R	Did not qualify				
Grand Slam	DNQ	RR	DNQ	RR	Did not qualify			
PDC Non-ranked televised events
World Cup	DNP	1R	1R	1R	RR	2R	DNQ	2R
World Youth Championship	F	2R	QF	RR	RR	QF	4R	RR
Career statistics
PDC Season-end ranking	186	148	104 (Note: Received Tour card through Q School and started the season without ranking points)	62	61	76	141	

=== PDC European Tour ===
Tournament	2019	2021	2022	2023	2025	2026
Czech Open	DNQ	NH	QF	1R	DNP	1R
Austrian Championship	2R	Not held				
Hungarian Trophy	NH	QF	Did not qualify			
International Open	DNQ	NH	1R	Did not qualify		
German Grand Prix	DNP	NH	1R	Did not qualify		
European Open	DNP	NH	1R	Did not qualify		
European Grand Prix	DNP	DNQ	2R	Did not qualify		
Dutch Championship	Not held		DNQ	1R	Did not qualify	
Flanders Trophy	Not held				1R	DNQ
Poland Open	Not held					2R
Belgian Open	NH		DNQ			1R

=== PDC Players Championships ===
Season	1	2	3	4	5	6	7	8	9	10	11	12	13	14	15	16	17	18	19	20	21	22	23	24	25	26	27	28	29	30				
2021	BOL; 2R	BOL; 1R	BOL; 1R	BOL; 1R	MIL; 1R	MIL; 1R	MIL; 1R	MIL; 1R	NIE; 1R	NIE; 1R	NIE; 2R	NIE; 1R	MIL; DNP				COV; 3R	COV; 1R	COV; 1R	COV; 1R	BAR; 1R	BAR; 1R	BAR; 1R	BAR; 1R	BAR; 1R	BAR; 1R	BAR; 1R	BAR; 1R	BAR; 1R	BAR; 2R				
2022	BAR; 1R	BAR; 2R	WIG; 1R	WIG; 4R	BAR; 2R	BAR; 2R	NIE; 2R	NIE; 1R	BAR; 2R	BAR; 1R	BAR; 2R	BAR; 2R	BAR; 4R	WIG; 3R	WIG; 1R	NIE; 1R	NIE; 1R	BAR; 1R	BAR; 1R	BAR; 1R	BAR; 1R	BAR; 1R	BAR; 2R	BAR; 1R	BAR; 1R	BAR; 2R	BAR; 3R	BAR; 1R	BAR; 2R	BAR; 2R				
2023	BAR; 1R	BAR; 1R	BAR; 3R	BAR; 1R	BAR; 1R	BAR; 2R	HIL; 3R	HIL; 1R	WIG; 1R	WIG; 1R	LEI; 1R	LEI; 2R	HIL; 1R	HIL; 1R	LEI; 1R	LEI; 1R	HIL; 1R	HIL; 1R	BAR; 1R	BAR; 1R	BAR; 4R	BAR; 1R	BAR; 1R	BAR; 3R	BAR; 1R	BAR; 1R	BAR; 1R	BAR; 1R	BAR; 1R	BAR; 3R				
2024	WIG; 1R	WIG; 2R	LEI; 1R	LEI; 3R	HIL; 1R	HIL; 2R	LEI; 1R	LEI; 1R	HIL; 3R	HIL; 1R	HIL; 1R	HIL; 1R	MIL; 1R	MIL; 1R	MIL; 3R	MIL; 2R	MIL; 1R	MIL; 1R	MIL; 1R	WIG; 1R	WIG; 1R	MIL; 1R	MIL; 1R	WIG; 2R	WIG; 2R	WIG; 1R	WIG; 2R	WIG; 1R	LEI; 2R	LEI; 1R				
2026	HIL; SF	HIL; 3R	WIG; 1R	WIG; 1R	LEI; 3R	LEI; 1R	LEI; 2R	LEI; 2R	WIG; 1R	WIG; 3R	MIL; 1R	MIL; 1R	HIL; 1R	HIL; 1R	LEI; 1R	LEI; 1R	LEI; 1R	LEI; 1R	MIL; 1R	MIL; 1R	WIG; 3R	WIG; 1R	LEI; 1R	LEI; 2R	HIL; 1R	HIL; 1R	LEI; 3R	LEI; 1R	ROS; 3R	ROS; 3R	ROS; 2R	ROS; 1R	LEI; 1R	LEI; 3R

Performance Table Legend
W	Won the tournament	F	Finalist	SF	Semifinalist	QF	Quarterfinalist	#R; RR; L#	Lost in # round Round-robin; Last # stage	DQ	Disqualified
DNQ	Did not qualify	DNP	Did not participate	WD	Withdrew	NH	Tournament not held	#R; RR; L#	Lost in # round Round-robin; Last # stage	NYF	Not yet founded
